= 1944 Mull of Galloway Douglas C-47 crash =

Aviation incident in Scotland

Occurrence
- Date: 27 July 1944
- Summary: Controlled flight into terrain due to poor visibility
- Site: Mull of Galloway, Wigtownshire, Scotland

Aircraft
- Aircraft type: Douglas C-47A Skytrain
- Aircraft name: Dakota
- Operator: United States Army Air Forces
- Registration: 42-93038
- Flight origin: RAF Merryfield, Somerset
- 1st stopover: Filton, England
- 2nd stopover: Prestwick, Scotland
- 3rd stopover: Keflavík, Iceland
- 4th stopover: Godthåb, Greenland
- 5th stopover: Gander, Canada
- 6th stopover: Boston, Massachusetts
- Destination: New York City, New York
- Occupants: 22
- Passengers: 17
- Crew: 5
- Fatalities: 22
- Injuries: 0
- Survivors: 0

The 1944 Mull of Galloway Douglas C-47 crash occurred on 27 July 1944, when a Douglas C-47 Skytrain (military version of the DC-3), serial number 42-93038, crashed into cliffs at the Mull of Galloway in Wigtownshire, Scotland. All 22 people on board were killed.

== Aircraft ==
The Douglas DC-3 was developed in the 1930s as a result of airline interest in a larger, more capable airliner. Modified from the DC-2, the DC-3 first flew on 17 December 1935. It was later adapted for military use as the C-47 Skytrain, with modifications including a cargo door, reinforced flooring, hoist attachment, and glider-towing capabilities. Over 10,000 C-47s were produced during World War II.

== Accident ==
On 27 July 1944, C-47A 42-93038 departed Filton near Bristol, England, transporting 17 wounded American servicemen from the Normandy landings and 5 crew members. The aircraft was en route to Prestwick, Scotland, as part of a multi-leg journey to the United States, which included stops in Iceland, Greenland, Canada, and Boston.

Flying in poor visibility, the C-47 was one of two aircraft traveling together. The lead aircraft, 42-93038, maintained low altitude so that the trailing plane could stay in visual contact. As it neared the Scottish mainland, the aircraft flew toward the Mull of Galloway, a headland with cliffs rising over 400 feet (120 m). The pilots, unaware of their proximity to the terrain due to fog and low visibility, attempted to gain altitude too late.

The plane struck the cliffs just below the crest, about six feet short of clearing the top, and crashed, killing everyone on board.

== Victims ==
While initial report stated 24 people aboard, there were 22 people aboard the aircraft consisting of 17 wounded servicemen and 5 crew members.

== Memorials ==
A memorial plaque was installed at the crash site and unveiled on 27 July 1999, marking the 55th anniversary of the tragedy. The metal plaque is mounted on a rockface, approximately 7 feet off the ground, and surrounded by fragments of the wreckage, some of which are embedded into the rock. A related memorial also exists at the Portpatrick Lifeboat Station.

== See also ==
- List of accidents and incidents involving the Douglas DC-3
