= List of accidents and incidents involving the DC-3 in 1954 =

This is a list of accidents and incidents involving Douglas DC-3 variants that have taken place in the year 1954, including aircraft based on the DC-3 airframe such as the Douglas C-47 Skytrain and Lisunov Li-2. Military accidents are included; and hijackings and incidents of terrorism are covered, although acts of war are outside the scope of this list.

== January ==
- January 8: A man in a Soviet Air Force uniform and a woman hijacked Aeroflot Flight 365, an Li-2, shortly after takeoff from Tallinn and demanded to be flown to Finland. Both were armed with pistols and the woman also had a knife. The flight engineer attempted to intervene, but was shot (he died the next day). After a struggle with the pilots, the hijackers were subdued and tied up and the aircraft turned around and returned to Tallinn. The flight engineer was awarded Hero of the Soviet Union (posthumous), the pilot the Order of the Red Banner and the remaining crew the Order of the Red Star. A monument to the flight engineer was erected in Minsk in 1965.
- January 11: An Avianca C-47A (registration HK-160) struck a mountain at Manizales, Colombia, killing all 21 on board.
- January 12: A Czechoslovak Airlines C-47A (registration OK-WDS) struck a chimney on climbout from Prague, killing all 13 on board.
- January 20: A Zantop Air Transport Douglas DC-3A (registration N49551) crashed while on approach to Fairfax Field, Kansas due to icing and resultant loss of control, killing all three on board.
- January 24: An Autrex C-47A (registration F-BEFS) crashed at Basra International Airport due to pilot error while on a Paris-Hanoi delivery flight; all three on board survived, but the aircraft was written off.
- January 27: An Aeroflot/Armenia Li-2 (CCCP-L4105) struck the side of Mount Kara-Dag (7.5 mi W of Tsaghkashen) during an atmospheric sounding flight due to a navigation error, killing all six crew. The aircraft had been blown off 18 km (11 mi) course by strong winds.
- January 31: An Aigle Azur C-47A (registration F-BGXD) crashed on takeoff at Gia Lam Airport after the landing gear was raised before lifting off; there were no casualties, but the aircraft was written off.

== February ==
- February 4: A SKOGA Li-2 (13) overran the runway on landing at Beijing Xijiao Airport, China following a go-around; no casualties. The aircraft was completing a Shenyang-Beijing cargo service.
- February 5: USAF C-47D 45-895 crashed on Kesugi Ridge in what is now Denali State Park. Ten men died and six survived. A memorial plaque was erected in 1998 in the Veterans Memorial Park in Denali State Park by the survivors, their families and families of the men who died. The book, "Touching the Ancient One," written by one of the survivors, tells the story in detail.
- February 9: An Avianca C-47-DL (registration HK-167) crashed and caught fire at Medellin, Colombia; both pilots survived, but the aircraft was written off.
- February 25: An Indian Airlines C-47A (registration VT-ATU) crashed at Nagpur while on a test to determine the cause of a 1953 DC-3 accident, killing all three on board.

== March ==
- March 4: USAAF C-47A 42-24096 struck a mountain near Saint-Étienne-de-Tinée, France due to a navigation error, killing all 20 on board.
- March 13: An Autrex C-47-DL (registration F-BCYI) crashed on landing at Xieng Khouang Airport, Laos; there were no casualties, but the aircraft was written off.
- March 14: A Queensland Airlines C-47A (registration VH-BBV) crashed into sea off Mackay Airport, killing both pilots.
- March 19: A LOT Polish Airlines Li-2P (registration SP-LAH) flying from Warsaw to Krakow struck Cwilin hill (near Gruszowice, Poland) due to a navigation error after a radio beacon lost power, killing one; the pilot saw rising terrain at the last second and pulled up which reduced the impact.
- March 25: An Aeronaves de México C-53-DO (registration XA-GUN) struck Friars Peak while waiting to land, killing all 18 on board.

== April ==
- April 3: A Devlet Hava Yollari C-47A (registration TC-ARK) crashed 15 min after takeoff from Adana Airport, killing all 25 on board.
- April 23: An Aerolíneas Argentinas C-47A (registration LV-ACX) crashed at Sierra del Vilgo after an unexplained course change, killing all 25 on board.
- April 25: An Autrex C-47-DL (registration F-BCYJ) crashed on landing at Nam Bac, Laos; both pilots survived, but the aircraft was written off.
- April 30: A Darbhanga Aviation C-47A (registration VT-DEM) crashed on climbout from Dum Dum Airport after an unexplained engine failure and resultant loss of altitude, killing five of 11 on board.

== May ==
- May 15: A Jamair C-47B (registration VT-DGO) ran off the runway after landing at Saugaon, India; all three on board survived, but the aircraft was written off.
- May 21: An Autrex C-47-DL (registration F-BEIP) crashed into the Red River near Hanoi, killing all three on board.
- May 22: New Zealand National Airways Corporation Flight 152 (a Douglas DC-3C, registration ZK-AQT) crashed at Paraparaumu Airport due to fuel exhaustion caused by pilot error, killing three of 28 on board.
- May 29: A LAN Chile C-47A (registration CC-CLH-0184) was blown off the runway while landing at Porvenir Airport; all 29 on board survived, but the aircraft was written off.
- May 31: A Transportes Aéreos Nacionales C-47A (registration PP-ANO) crashed in the Serra del Cipo Mountains due to a navigation error and pilot error, killing all 19 on board.

== June ==
- June 15: Delta Air Lines Flight 134X, a C-47A (registration N51359), crashed on takeoff from Atlanta Municipal Airport due to windshear; both pilots survived, but the aircraft was written off. The aircraft was beginning an Atlanta–Chattanooga–Knoxville–Cincinnati–Chicago cargo service.
- June 21: RAF Douglas Dakota KN647 struck a hill at night while descending for Nairobi, killing all seven on board.
- June 23: An Li-2 (CCCP-I403) of MAP (Ministervo Aviatsionnoi Promyshlennosti, Minister of Aviation Industry) Omsk Aviation Plant 166 crashed on takeoff in the Sverdlovsk region, killing four of seven on board.

== August ==
- August 8: An Alaska Airlines C-47A (registration N91008) struck a mountain 25 mi northwest of McGrath, Alaska, killing both pilots.
- August 22: Braniff International Airways Flight 152 (a Douglas C-47-DL, registration N61451) crashed 16 mi south of Mason City, Iowa after encountering turbulence in a thunderstorm, killing 12 of 19 on board.
- August 24: RAAF Douglas Dakota A65-50 crashed near Canberra due to engine failure and resultant loss of altitude, killing one of four on board.
- August 26: Aeroflot Flight 971 (an Li-2, registration CCCP-Л4679) crashed 13.5 km (8.4 mi) southeast of Yuzhno-Sakhalinsk, killing 26 of 27 on board; the wreckage was found the next day on a hilltop; the aircraft had struck trees and crashed on the hill.

== September ==
- September 4: An Air Outre-Mer C-47B (registration F-BEIO) crashed on landing at Gia Lam Airport, Vietnam; there were no casualties, but the aircraft was written off.
- September 12: A Cruzeiro do Sul C-47A (registration PP-CDJ) crashed off Rio de Janeiro after an attempted overshoot due to pilot error, killing six of 30 on board.

== October ==
- October 11: RTAF C-47B L2-10/96 crashed at Bangkok International Airport after an engine failed shortly after takeoff, killing four of 18 on board.
- October 13: An Orient Airways C-47-DL (registration AP-AAF) force-landed in the Skardu River basin near Skardu, Pakistan; all 11 on board survived, but the aircraft was written off.
- October 20: A Civil Air Transport C-47A (registration B-811) crashed off Hua Hin, Thailand while on a practice paratroop drop mission, killing six of seven on board.
- October 21: A Cruzeiro do Sul R4D-1 (registration PP-CCP, named Jurema) overran the runway while landing at Rio de Janeiro due to pilot error; all 31 on board survived, but the aircraft was written off.
- October 24: USAF Douglas C-47A 43-16044 struck a mountain in the Maritime Alps on the France/Italy border due to a navigation error, killing all 21 on board.

== November ==
- November 12: An Aeroflot Li-2 (registration CCCP-L4519) crashed on takeoff from Koltsovo Airport, Sverdlovsk (now Yekaterinburg) due to crew error, killing six of 15 on board.
- November 16: A TAM Peru DC-3 (registration FAP403) struck an ice wall near Jirishanca, Peru, killing all 24 on board; the wreckage was found on December 4.
- November 25: A Garuda Indonesia C-47A (registration PK-DPD) overran the runway while landing at Jambi Airport due to pilot error; all 32 on board survived, but the aircraft was written off.
- November 30: Northeast Airlines Flight 792 (a C-53D, registration N17891) crashed while on approach to Berlin, New Hampshire due to pilot error, killing two of seven on board.

== December ==
- December 4: An Air Laos C-47A (registration F-BEIA) crashed 19 mi north of Luang Prabang on the company's first commercial flight, killing all 28 on board. The aircraft was leased from Aigle Azur.
- December 18: A C-47A (registration YV-C-AMP) crashed in the mountains 75 mi south of Ciudad Bolivar en route to Tumeremo, killing both pilots.
- December 22: A military charter Douglas DC-3 en route from Newark, New Jersey to the west coast crashes into the icy Monongahela River near the Pittsburgh suburb of Duquesne, Pennsylvania shortly after midnight, with 28 on board, 23 of them veterans. Both the Allegheny County Airport and Pittsburgh International Airport received emergency calls from the pilot before the plane ditched into the river, with rescuers forming human chains to pull 18 of the men to safety as motorists on the shore turned their lights on the scene, spotlighting the way. All 18 were rushed to the McKeesport Hospital for exposure, while 10 were still missing.
- December 23: A Malév Hungarian Airlines Li-2P (registration HA-LIF) en route to Prague from Budapest force-landed near Polná, Czechoslovakia (now Czech Republic) due to icing, breaking off the landing gear and bending both wings; all 33 on board survived. The same day another Malév Li-2P (registration HA-LII) belly-landed near Bratraňov, Czechoslovakia (now Czech Republic) also due to icing, shearing off the left engine; all 19 on board survived. Both aircraft were written off.

== Unknown date ==
- An Polyarnaya Aviatsiya R4D-5 (CCCP-Н417) landed wheels-up at Polar Station SP-3 when the landing gear struck an ice hummock; the fuselage was used as a sauna and eventually sank. The aircraft was previously used by the US Navy for Project Ski Jump and was performing landings on drifting ice in the Beaufort Sea; the aircraft suffered landing gear failure on landing during one of these flights and was abandoned; the Soviets salvaged the aircraft in May 1954 and repaired it.
- A LANSA C-47A (C-68) was reportedly written off following an accident at an unknown location; the accident occurred during or shortly before 1954.

== See also ==
List of accidents and incidents involving the DC-3 in the 1950s
