= List of accidents and incidents involving the DC-3 in 1961 =

This is a list of accidents and incidents involving the Douglas DC-3^{A} that occurred in 1961, including aircraft based on the DC-3 airframe such as the Douglas C-47 Skytrain and Lisunov Li-2. Military accidents are included; and hijackings and incidents of terrorism are covered, although acts of war involving military aircraft are outside the scope of this list.

== January ==
- January 2: A Dutch Navy Douglas C-47B (registration 079) crashed off Biak, Indonesia after an in-flight fire during a night time training flight, killing all five on board.
- January 3: Aero Flight 311 (a Douglas DC-3C) stalled on turn at Kvevlax, Finland due to extremely bad weather, pilot error and loss of control, leading to explosion, fire and full hull loss, killing all 25 occupants on board. Both pilots were intoxicated. This is the worst aviation accident ever happened in Finland and also the worst ever to Aero OY (modern day Finnair).
- January 24: Garuda Indonesia Flight 424 (a Douglas DC-3C, registration PK-GDI) disappeared on a Jakarta-Surabaya service with 21 on board; the wreckage was found four days later on the slope of Mount Burangrang; pilot error was blamed.

== February ==
- February 3: Garuda Indonesia flight 542 (a Douglas C-47A-20-DK, registration PK-GDY) disappeared off Madura Island on a scheduled domestic passenger flight, from Surabaya-Juanda Airport to Sultan Aji Muhammad Sulaiman Airport. Five crew members and 21 passengers were lost in the accident. The wreckage was never found.

== March ==
- March 9: A Douglas C-47A (registration YV-C-AZQ) operated by Linea Aeropostal Venezolana crashed at Paramo Turmal while operating a San Antonio del Tachira to Caracas service due to a navigation error, killing all 12 on board.
- March 15: A Douglas C-53 (registration PP-YQS) operated by REAL Transportes Aéreos struck a hill while on approach to Ponta Grossa after diverting due to bad weather, killing all three on board.

== April ==
- April 3: LAN Chile Flight 621 (a Douglas DC-3C, registration CC-CLDP) crashed on La Gotera hill while operating a Castro-Santiago service, killing all 24 on board (including 10 from CD Green Cross) in the worst accident in Chile at the time; the cause was not determined. The tail of the aircraft was found a week after the crash, but the fuselage was not found until 54 years later in February 2015.
- April 4: A Douglas C-47-DL (registration CF-JNR) operated by Eastern Provincial Airways crashed on takeoff at Saint Pierre Airport after the left main landing gear collapsed; both crew and all 25 passengers on board survived, but the aircraft was written off.
- April 8: A Douglas C-47B (registration VH-PAT) operated by Papuan Airlines made an emergency landing at Bereina Airport after the cargo began smoking, probably caused by improperly packed chemicals. The aircraft burned out after landing; all three crew on board survived.
- April 12: A Douglas DC-3S (registration N541S) operated by US Steel slid off the runway at Mercer County Airport, West Virginia; all four on board survived (including the vice president of US Steel), but the aircraft was written off.
- April 12: A Douglas C-47A (registration CF-GXE) operated by the Canada Department of Transport force-landed at St-Jean-sur-Richelieu, Québec, Canada after both engines failed on takeoff for a calibration flight; all three on board survived, but the aircraft was written off.
- April 21: A Douglas C-47A (registration N200) operated by the Federal Aviation Agency crashed near Mustang, Oklahoma due to pilot error and loss of control while on a training flight, killing all four on board.

== May ==
- May 6: A Douglas C-47B (registration SU-ALP) operated by United Arab Airlines crashed and burned 300 yards from Al Qamishli Airport; all seven on board survived, but the aircraft was written off.
- May 19: A USAF Douglas SC-47A (registration 43-15277) crashed shortly after takeoff from Wiesbaden Air Base, Germany, killing both pilots.
- April 12: A Douglas DC3 (registration CF-GXE) operated by the Canada Department of Transport force-landed at Saint-Jean Airport, Quebec, Canada (CYJN) after both engines failed on takeoff for a calibration flight; all three on board survived, but the aircraft was written off. This never happened in CYYT

== July ==
- July 31: A RAAF Douglas C-47B (registration A65-109) struck a hill shortly after takeoff from Pearce Airport while returning from calibrating a tracking station for the Mercury Project, killing four of seven on board.

== August ==
- August 6: A Douglas C-47A (registration HA-TSA) operated by Malév Hungarian Airlines crashed at Budapest while on a sightseeing flight due to carelessness of the crew, killing all 27 on board and three on the ground in Hungary's worst air disaster at the time.
- August 26: A Douglas C-47A (registration VT-AXA) operated by Indian Airlines crashed on takeoff from Dum Dum Airport; all three on board survived; but the aircraft was written off.

== September ==
- September 5: A Douglas C-47A (registration ET-T-16) operated by Ethiopian Airlines crashed due to propeller malfunction while on a survey flight, killing five of 19 on board.
- September 26: A Lisunov Li-2 (registration CCCP-16154) operated by Aeroflot/Yakutsk crashed 59 mi W of Oymyakon, Russia due to double engine failure caused by crew error, killing all six on board. The aircraft was operating a Yakutsk-Oymyakon cargo service.

== October ==
- October 7: A Douglas Dakota IV (registration G-AMSW) operated by Derby Aviation crashed on Canigou, France due to a navigation error, killing all 34 on board.
- October 17: A Douglas C-47B (registration G-AMVC) operated by BKS Air Transport crashed at Groglin Fell, United Kingdom, killing all four on board; the cause was not determined.

== November ==
- November 10: A Força Aérea Portuguesa Douglas C-47A (registration 6154) crashed into terrain in bad weather at Chitado, Angola, killing all 18 on board.
- November 22: A Douglas C-47A (registration VP-YRX) operated by Rhodesian Air Services crashed on approach to Livingstone, Zambia due to engine failure and loss of control, killing two of three on board.

== December ==
- December 7: A Douglas C-47A (registration VT-AZV) operated by Jamair crashed on takeoff from Amritsar, India due to fuel starvation and pilot error; both pilots survived, but the aircraft was written off.
- December 18: A Lisunov Li-2 (registration CCCP-84603) operated by Aeroflot/Yakutsk crashed near Olyokminsk, Russia, killing four.

== See also ==
- List of accidents and incidents involving the DC-3 in the 1960s

== Notes ==
^Note A Military versions of the DC-3 were known as C-47 Skytrain, C-48, C-49, C-50, C-51, C-52, C-53 Skytrooper, C-68, C-84, C-117 Super Dakota and YC-129 by the United States Army Air Forces and as the R4D by the United States Navy. In Royal Air Force (and other British Commonwealth air forces') service, these aircraft were known as Dakotas.
