= List of accidents and incidents involving the DC-3 in 1955 =

This is a list of accidents and incidents involving Douglas DC-3 variants that occurred in the year 1955, including aircraft based on the DC-3 airframe, such as the Douglas C-47 Skytrain and Lisunov Li-2. Military accidents are included; and hijackings and incidents of terrorism are covered, although acts of war are outside the scope of this list.

== January ==
- January 12: A Castleton Inc. C-47 (N999B) collided in mid-air with TWA Flight 694, a Martin 2-0-2A, over Cincinnati, Ohio, killing all 15 on board both aircraft.
- January 13: Aeroflot Flight 31 (an Li-2, CCCP-Л5000) crashed near Bykovo due to engine failure caused by sabotage, killing the five crew; the aircraft was operating a Moscow-Gorky-Sverdlovsk cargo service.
- January 21: An Indian Airlines C-47A (VT-COZ) struck trees and crashed at Guwahati, India, killing the three crew. The aircraft was operating a Calcutta-Guwahati cargo service.
- January 23: Aeroflot Flight 613 (an Li-2T, CCCP-Л4510) crashed near Lipovets, Kagarlyksky district due to an in-flight fire, killing three of 13 on board. The aircraft, operating a Kiev-Simferpol passenger service, had been converted at ARB-411 from a cargo to a combi configuration, but during the conversion, the construction deviated from the standard at ARB-402; the cabin insulation was not fireproof and the ventilation system was not properly assembled. A crew member threw a lit cigarette out the right side cockpit window and it landed inside the ventilation intake; sparks from the cigarette ignited the insulation, starting the fire.

== February ==
- February 2: An Indian Airlines C-47A (VT-CVB) crashed at Nagpur, India due to pilot error, killing all 10 on board. The aircraft was operating a Nagpur-Delhi passenger/mail service.
- February 23: Central African Airways Flight 626, a C-47B (VP-YKO), overran the runway at Salisbury Airport after smoke entered the cockpit; the number one propeller broke off and penetrated the fuselage, killing the flight engineer; all 21 passengers and four remaining crew survived. The cause of the smoke was traced to a leaking oil hose on the number one engine.

== March ==
- March 6: A REAL Transportes Aereos DC-3A (PP-YPZ) crashed at Vitoria da Conquista Airport following an overshoot due to landing gear problems, killing five of 21 on board.
- March 8: Mexicana Flight 591, a Douglas DC-3A-228D (XA-DIK), crashed in the Cerro del Cabre mountain range, killing all 26 on board.
- March 9: An Avianca C-47A (HK-328) struck Cerro Trujillo, killing all eight on board; the wreckage was found four days later.

== April ==
- April 2: A GUSMP Li-2 (CCCP-Н497) crashed on landing near Mys Zhelaniya after the landing gear broke through the ice; all 10 on board were able to escape, but the aircraft could not be recovered and sank four days later during a storm.

== May ==
- May 8: Aeroflot Flight 599 (an Li-2, CCCP-Л4098) crashed near Dnepropetrovsk (now Dnipro) due to wing separation in turbulence, killing the four crew. The aircraft was operating a Kiev-Dnepropetrovsk-Zaporozhye cargo service.
- May 18: East African Airways Flight 104, a C-47B (VP-KKH) struck Mount Kilimanjaro due to weather and pilot error, killing all 20 on board; the wreckage was found four days later. The accident remains the worst in Tanzania.
- May 26: A GUSMP Li-2 (CCCP-Н535) crashed on an ice floe in the central Arctic basin after the right side landing gear struck an ice hummock and broke; the nose touched the ice and the fuselage then split in three after falling back on the ice. All 10 on board survived and were evacuated by another aircraft; the wreckage was set on fire and abandoned. The wreckage was sighted by the Icelandic Coast Guard on December 11, 1959.

== June ==
- June 25: Two Indian Air Force C-47's collided in mid-air near Agra, India, killing all 19 on board both aircraft.

== August ==
- August 26: A Cruzeiro do Sul DC-3A (PP-CBY) struck a mountain in the Serra do Costelo due to ATC error, pilot error and an incorrect chart, killing all 13 on board.

== September ==
- September 8: A Currey Air Transport R4D-1 (N74663) crashed at Lockheed Air Terminal while attempting an emergency landing following engine failure, killing three of 33 on board.
- September 28: Aeroflot Flight 349 (an Li-2, CCCP-Л4712) crashed near Borovichy due to engine failure and radio problems, killing seven of 19 on board. The engine failure was caused by an oil leak.

== November ==
- November 5: A Mexican Government C-47A (XC-ABW) crashed in Lake Texcoco due to engine failure, killing four of 17 on board; the aircraft was rebuilt in the United States and re-registered N1369N; it was then sold to the Brazilian Air Force as FAB2065.

== December ==
- December 9: Aeroflot Flight 976 (an Li-2, CCCP-Л4993) disappeared while operating a Yuzhno-Sakhalinsk-Khabarovsk service with 21 on board; the aircraft was found on December 21 on Mount Tordoki Yani, Khabarovsk with no survivors. The aircraft had encountered a severe downdraft and was unable to maintain altitude.
- December 9: Aeroflot Flight 101 (an Li-2, CCCP-Л4339) crashed in the Tyumen region due to spatial disorientation of the crew, killing seven of nine on board. The aircraft was operating a Moscow-Petropavlovsk-Sverdlovsk-Ust-Kamenogorsk passenger service.
- December 21: Aeroflot Flight 90 (an Li-2, CCCP-Л4981) crashed in a snowy desert 105 km (65 mi) from Balkhash Lake after the pilot became disorientated, killing the six crew. The gyrocompass and autopilot had malfunctioned due to failure of a vacuum regulator.
- December 22: A Manx Airlines C-47 (G-AMZC) was being ferried from Isle of Man to Düsseldorf when it struck trees and crashed near Düsseldorf Airport due to pilot error, killing the three crew.

== See also ==
List of accidents and incidents involving the DC-3 in the 1950s
