= List of accidents and incidents involving the DC-3 in 1968 =

This is a list of accidents and incidents involving the Douglas DC-3^{[Note A]} that occurred in 1968, including aircraft based on the DC-3 airframe such as the Douglas C-47 Skytrain and Lisunov Li-2. Military accidents are included; and hijackings and incidents of terrorism are covered, although acts of war involving military aircraft are outside the scope of this list.

== January ==
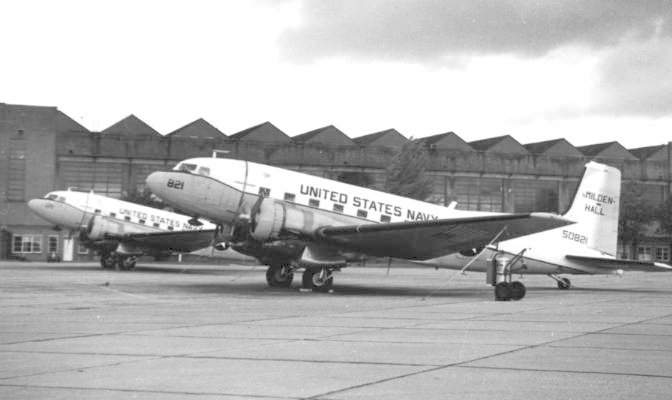
LC-117Ds of the United States Navy

- 8 January: Douglas C-47B YU-ABK of Jugoslovenski Aerotransport was operating an international scheduled cargo flight from Riem Airport, Munich, West Germany to Pleso Airport, Zagreb, Yugoslavia when a fire developed in one of the engines. An attempt was made to divert to Hörsching Airport, Linz but the aircraft force landed short of the airport in a forest at Sankt Florian. All four people on board survived.
- 15 January: Douglas DC-3 SU-AJG of United Arab Airlines departed from Cairo International Airport on an international scheduled cargo flight to Beirut International Airport, Lebanon when the crew decided to return due to icing. The aircraft subsequently broke up in mid-air and crashed at Zifta; all four people on board died. The cargo shifting in flight and the aircraft being 500 kilograms (1,100 lb) overloaded may have contributed to the accident.
- 17 January: Douglas C-47A 5N-AAL of the Nigerian Air Force was damaged beyond economic repair at Lagos.
- 20 January: Douglas C-47A FAB2026 of the Força Aérea Brasileira was damaged beyond economic repair at General Carneiro.
- January: Douglas LC-117D 99853 of the United States Navy was damaged beyond economic repair at Williams Field when it was dropped whilst being loaded onto USNS Private John R. Towle.

== February ==
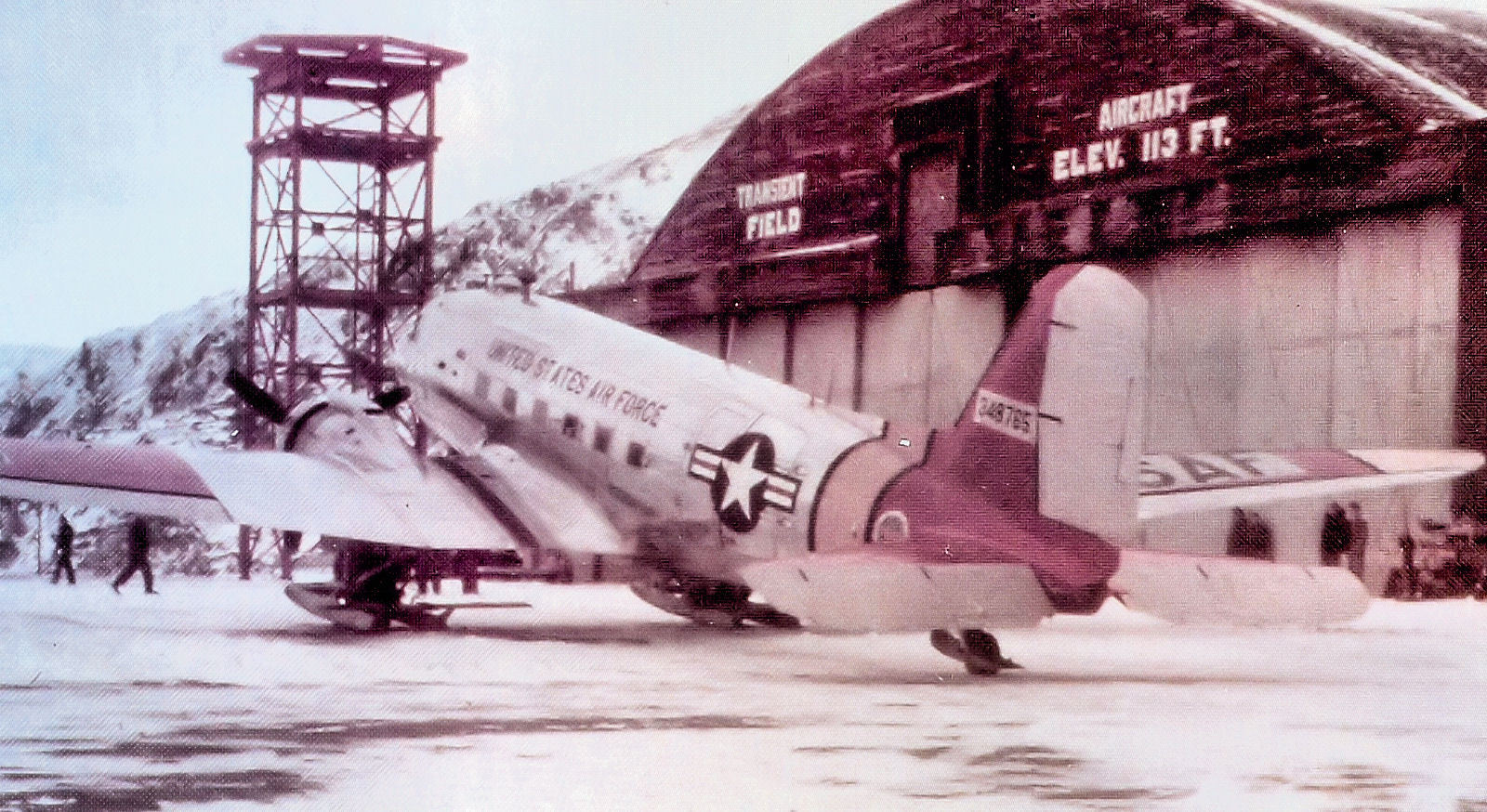
A United States Air Force C-47

- 9 February: Douglas C-47 HZ-AAE of Saudi Arabian Airlines was damaged beyond economic repair.
- 18 February: Douglas C-47D 43-48471 of the United States Air Force crashed on take-off from Tan Son Nhut Air Base, Saigon. All three people on board survived.
- 24 February: Douglas DC-3 XW-TAD of Royal Air Lao crashed into the Mekong River whilst on a domestic scheduled passenger flight from Wattay International Airport, Vientiane to Sayaboury Airport, Sainyabuli. All 37 people on board died.
- 29 February: Douglas C-47A N252W of Millers Aviation crashed on take-off from Statesville Municipal Airport, Statesville, North Carolina. The aircraft was on a cargo flight when it suffered an engine failure and crashed into trees. All four people on board survived.

== March ==
- 22 March: Douglas C-47A 607 of Air America was damaged beyond economic repair in a landing accident at Gia Nghĩa.
- 27 March: Douglas C-47A PP-BTX of Paraense Transportes Aéreos was damaged beyond economic repair at an unknown location.

== April ==
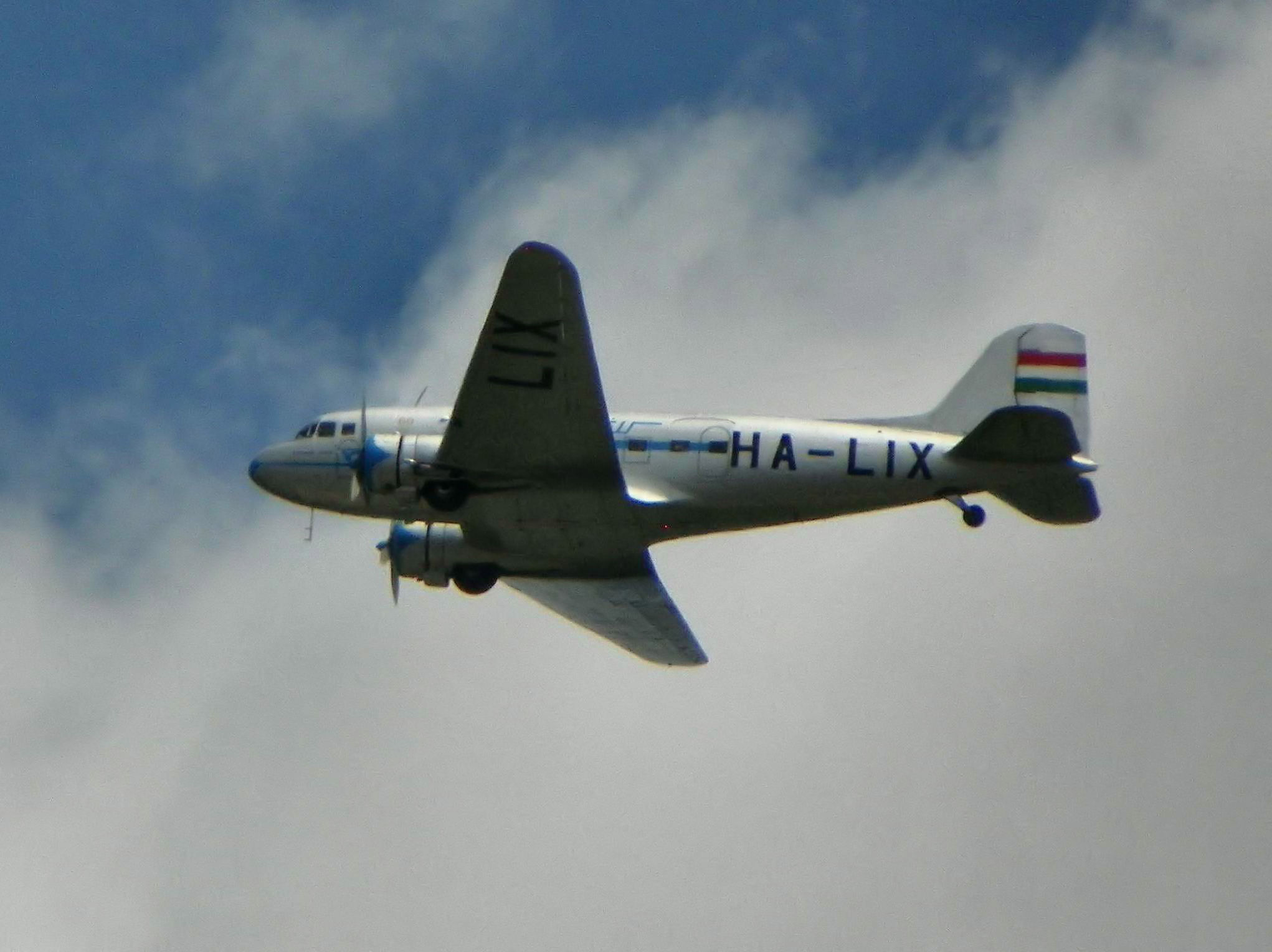
A Hungarian registered Lisunov Li-2

- 4 April: Douglas C-47 IJ304 of the Indian Air Force was damaged beyond economic repair.
- 8 April: Douglas C-49K CC-CBM of LADECO crashed on approach to Balmaceda Airport; all 36 people on board died. The aircraft was operating a domestic scheduled passenger flight from Los Cerillos Airport, Santiago.
- 10 April: Douglas R4D-3 XA-GEV of Aerovías Rojas crashed on approach to Mexico City International Airport; all 18 people on board died. The aircraft was operating a domestic scheduled passenger flight, which was the airline's inaugural flight from Aguascalientes International Airport to Mexico City.
- 19 April: Douglas VC-47D CP-734 of Lloyd Aéreo Boliviano crashed on take-off from Trinidad Airport.
- 24 April: Lisunov Li-2 HA-LIO of Magyar Honvédelmi Szövetség was destroyed by fire in a refuelling accident at Szolnok Air Base.

== June ==
- 8 June: Douglas C-53 N74139 of Aerodyne Engineering Corporation crashed at Isla del Frontón Airport whilst attempting a go-around. The aircraft was operating an executive flight, all ten on board survived.

== August ==
- 18 August: Douglas DC-3D 9Q-CUM of Air Congo was destroyed by fire at N'djili Airport, Kinshasa.

== September ==
- 26 September: Douglas C-47A N64423 of the Ford Motor Company crashed at Teterboro, New Jersey. The aircraft was operating a cargo flight and the cause of the accident was the cargo shifting in flight. Both occupants survived.

== October ==
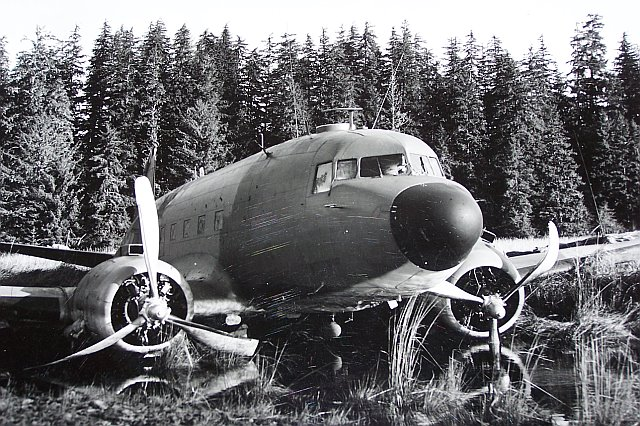
Douglas EC-47Q 42–24304 at Prince of Wales Island, Alaska.

- 20 October: Douglas C-47A PP-SAD of Serviços Aéreos Cruzeiro do Sul crashed near Feijó Airport, Feijó, Acre whilst attempting to return to the airport. All 19 people on board died.
- 20 October: Douglas C-47D 45-0394 of the United States Air Force crashed 20 miles (32 km) south of Ban Me Thuot; all 23 people on board died. The aircraft was operating a military flight from Tan Son Nhut Air Base, Saigon to Da Nang Air Base, Da Nang when the starboard engine failed and the propeller would not feather. At attempt was made to divert to Phung-Duc Airport but the aircraft crashed into terrain in poor weather.
- 25 October: Douglas C-47A PH-DAA of KLM Aerocarto flew into Tafelberg following an engine failure whilst on a survey flight. The aircraft collided with the mountain in cloud; three of the five people on board died.
- 25 October: Douglas EC-47Q 42-24304 of the United States Air Force crashed on Prince of Wales Island, Alaska. The aircraft was on a ferry flight from McChord Air Force Base, Tacoma, Washington, United States to Elmendorf Air Force Base, Alaska as part of a ferry flight from the United States to Vietnam. The starboard engine failed and an attempt was made to divert to Annette Island Coast Guard Station but the port engine also failed. Attempts to restart either engine were unsuccessful and a belly landing was made on a salt marsh. All four crew survived. As of 2009, the aircraft was still where it came to rest.

== December ==
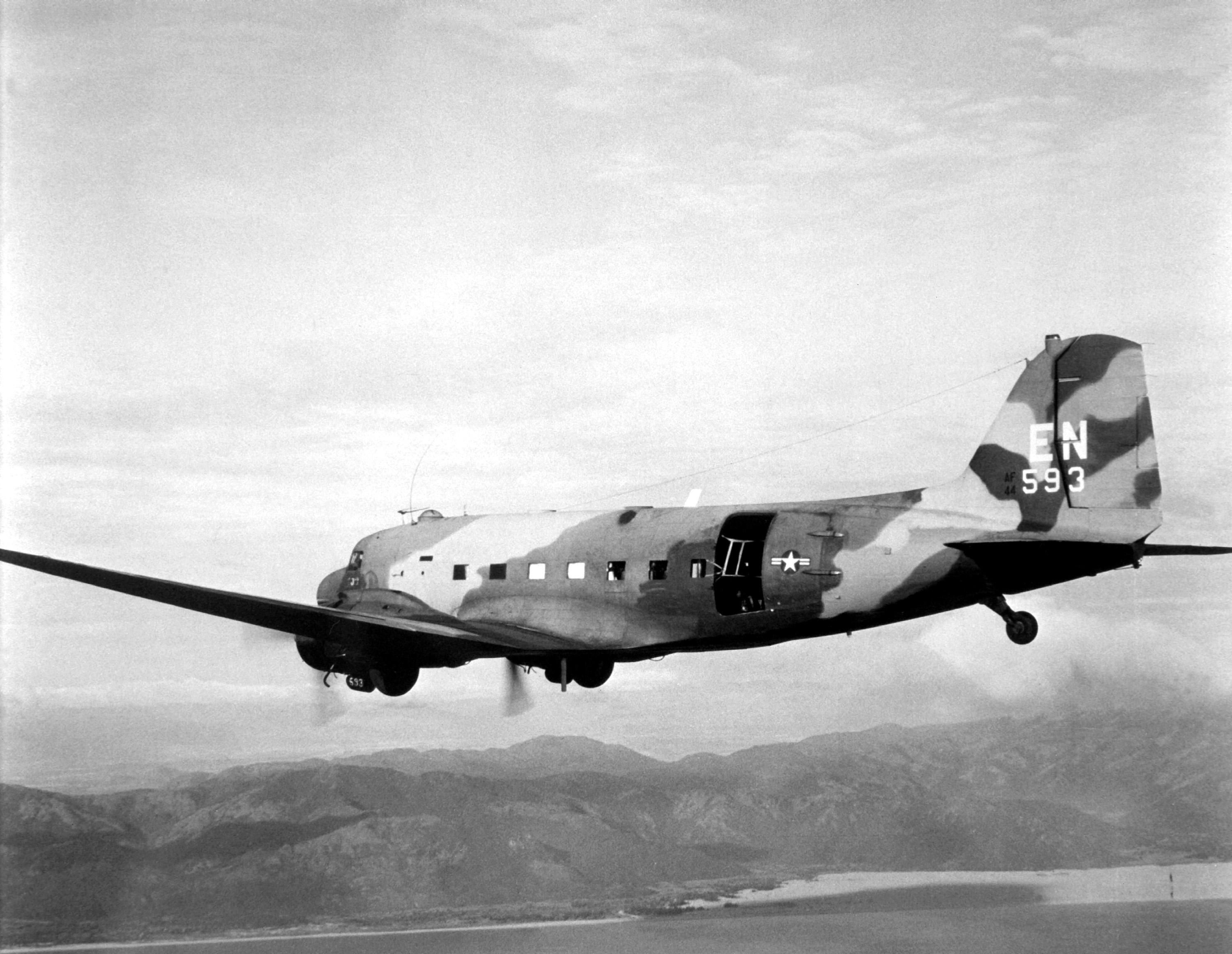
Douglas AC-47 Spooky of the United States Air Force

- 13 December: Douglas AC-47D Spooky 43-49274 of the United States Air Force collided in mid-air with North American Rockwell OV-10 Bronco 67-14627 whilst both aircraft were on a night-time combat operation at Truc Giang. Both aircraft attempted to return to Bien Hoa Air Base but the OV-10 crashed; both crew died. The AC-47D was damaged beyond economic repair when its undercarriage collapsed on landing.
- 24 December: Douglas C-47A 5Y-ADI of the Kenya Police Air Wing was damaged beyond economic repair at Wilson Airport, Nairobi. All three people on board died.
- 26 December: Douglas C-47B FAB2013 of the Força Aérea Brasiliera was damaged beyond economic repair at Praia Ponta Grossa.
- 26 December: a Douglas DC-3 of Exportada de Sal SA flew into a mountain near Ensenada; all 12 people on board died.
- 31 December: Douglas C-47A XA-SAE of SAESA crashed into a mountain near Ciudad Victoria; all 26 people on board died. The aircraft was operating a domestic scheduled passenger flight from General Lucio Blanco International Airport, Reynosa to Tampico International Airport.
- In December: Lisunov Li-2 CCCP-04214 of Polar Aviation was damaged beyond economic repair in a landing accident.

== See also ==
- List of accidents and incidents involving the DC-3 in the 1960s

== Notes ==
^Note A Military versions of the DC-3 were known as C-47 Skytrain, C-48, C-49, C-50, C-51, C-52, C-53 Skytrooper, C-68, C-84, C-117 Super Dakota and YC-129 by the United States Army Air Forces and as the R4D by the United States Navy. In Royal Air Force (and other British Commonwealth air forces') service, these aircraft were known as Dakotas.
