= List of accidents and incidents involving the DC-3 in 1962 =

This is a list of accidents and incidents involving the Douglas DC-3^{A} that occurred in 1962, including aircraft based on the DC-3 airframe such as the Douglas C-47 Skytrain and Lisunov Li-2. Military accidents are included; and hijackings and incidents of terrorism are covered, although acts of war involving military aircraft are outside the scope of this list.

== January ==
- January 10: USAF C-47D 44-76663 crashed and burned shortly after takeoff from Osan Air Base, South Korea, killing one of eight on board.
- January 10: An Air National Guard C-47 crashed at South Park Township, Pennsylvania during a night-time training flight due to possible engine failure, killing the five crew.
- January 13: An Ethiopian Air Lines C-47A (ET-T-1) swerved on takeoff from Tippi Airport and crashed into a mill, killing five of 18 on board; one person on the ground also died after being hit by the aircraft.
- January 25: Montana Gov. Donald Grant Nutter was en route to a speaking engagement in Cut Bank, Montana when the C-47 Skytrain he was a passenger in crashed. Winds exceeding 100 mph sheared off one of the wings of the plane, causing the aircraft to go down in Wolf Creek Canyon north of Helena. Also killed in the crash were Dennis Gordon, his executive secretary; Edward Wren, commissioner of agriculture; and three members of the Montana Air National Guard: Maj. Clifford Hanson, Maj. Joseph Devine and Master Sgt. Charles Ballard.

== February ==
- February 4: A Faucett C-53 (OB-PBH-530) crashed 11 mi northeast Tingo Maria, Peru after the left wing elevator separated for reasons unknown, killing all 18 on board.
- February 4: USAF C-47A 42-108992 crashed on takeoff from High Point Airport due to possible engine problems, killing all seven on board.
- February 11: USAF SC-47A 43-15732 crashed near Bao Loc, Vietnam while dropping propaganda leaflets over South Vietnam, killing the nine crew.
- February 25: An Avianca C-47A (HK-502) crashed at Municipio de Marulanda, Colombia due to pilot error, killing both pilots.

== March ==
- March 3: Aeronorte DC-3 registered PP-YQN crashed at Nanuque, Brazil.
- March 6: South African Airways Flight 512, a C-47B (ZS-DJC), struck trees and crashed 7 mi north of Seymour, South Africa due to pilot error, killing two of seven on board.

== April ==
- April 6: Colombian Air Force C-47 FAC-673 struck a mountain near Apiay Air Base, Colombia after deviating from the flight route during the approach, killing all 31 on board.
- April 10: Spanish Air Force C-47A T.3-26 crashed into the Guadalquivir River near Jerez de la Frontera, killing all 10 on board.
- April 18: A Douglas DC-3 operated by an aviation company affiliated with Purdue University, registration number N3588, crashed immediately after taking off from Dallas Love Field, Dallas, Texas, USA, to test a newly installed engine. The craft exploded into flames, killing all three people aboard. The crash was attributed to insufficient airspeed at takeoff, and the National Transportation Safety Board noted that the pilot was not properly qualified to fly a DC-3.
- April 22: An AVISPA C-47A (HK-524) struck Pico Bonito in the Serrania del Baudo mountain range for reasons unknown, killing all 40 on board.

== May ==
- May 6: A C-47 converted for passenger use (registered G-AGZB), operated by Channel Airways, crashed at St Boniface Down near Ventnor, Isle of Wight, UK. It was en route from Jersey in the Channel Isles to Portsmouth on the south coast of England. Thick fog and lack of navigational aids resulted in the pilot losing his way on a route with which he was unfamiliar. The crew of three were killed as were nine of the 14 passengers, the remaining five being seriously injured. The aircraft was destroyed.
- May 7: Indian Air Force C-47 HJ245 crashed in Arunachal Pradesh State, killing the four crew.
- May 9: A Burmese Air Force C-47 crashed near Mong-Hpayak, Burma (now Myanmar), killing all 29 on board.
- May 15: A United Arab Airlines DC-3 (SU-AJM) crashed shortly after takeoff from Cairo International Airport, killing the three crew.
- May 24: A Darbhanga Aviation C-47A (VT-AYG) crashed near Rajshahi in Bangladesh. The cause of crash has been attributed to fatigue failure of the No. 1 engine forcing the crew of the DC-3 to continue on a single engine (No. 2). After a while the remaining engine lost power due to overheating resulting in crash of the aircraft.Darbhanga Aviation#cite note-3

== June ==
- June 28: Royal Netherlands Air Force C-47B X-11 disappeared on a flight from Merauke to Biak with eight on board; wreckage was found by accident in 1969 on the side of Puncak Jaya at 4,160 m (13,650 ft); the remains of those on board were recovered in 1991.

== July ==
- July 15: A Vietnam Air Force C-47 crashed and burned on takeoff from Kontum Airport, killing 23 of 27 on board.
- July 16: A Kalinga Airlines C-47 (VT-DFZ) stalled and crashed near Lonheshyphu Dropping Zone, Naga Hills, India during a turn in a valley, killing all nine on board. The aircraft was operating a food supply dropping flight out of Jorhat.
- July 30: An Air France DC-3A (F-BAOE) crashed on takeoff from Voisins Airport after a wing hit a truck, killing five of eight crew.

== August ==
- August 1: A Royal Nepal Airlines C-47 (9N-AAH) disappeared on a Kathmandu-Delhi flight with 10 on board; the wreckage was found eight days later on a mountain top near Tulachan Dhuri, Nepal at 11,200 feet; the aircraft had drifted north of the flight route in bad weather.
- August 1: USAF C-47D 43-49773 was written off at an unknown location.
- August 16: Two Aeroflot Li-2s (CCCP-65680 and CCCP-54920) were written off after being blown over in a storm at Kishinev Airport.
- August 21: A LAB C-47B (CP-536) crashed at Cochabamba Airport during a test flight following a maintenance check, killing four of five on board.
- August 23: A Lineas Aereas Taxader R4D-1 (HK-794) crashed on takeoff from Barrancabermeja Airport due to pilot error, killing 12 of 32 on board.
- August 24: A Faucett C-47B (OB-PBN-659) crashed in the jungle at Cerro Puena Paz, killing all seven on board. The aircraft was transporting equipment and technicians from Cerro de Pasco Corporation, an oil exploration company, back to San Ramon.
- August 25: A JAT C-47A (YU-ABH) crashed on Mt. Prenj (28 km north of Mostar Airport). All 32 occupants survived, but the aircraft was destroyed by a post crash fire.

== September ==
- September 10: An Aerolineas Abaroa C-47A (CP-710) crashed into a river near Alcoche, Bolivia following engine failure, killing all four on board.
- September 21: A Kalinga Airlines C-47A (VT-DGX) crashed in the Sela Pass, India during a supply drop mission in the North-East Frontier Agency (now Arunachal Pradesh state), killing all eight on board.

== October ==
- October 9: A PLUNA C-47A (CX-AGE) crashed on takeoff from Carrasco Airport during a test flight due to a maintenance error, killing all 10 on board.
- October 23: A Philippine Air Lines DC-3 (PI-C485) crashed and burned on landing at Lumbia Airport; the crew survived.

== November ==
- November 10: An Air Vietnam C-47B (XV-NID) crashed 13 mi north-northwest of Da Nang Airport while on approach to the airport, killing all 27 on board; a navigation error was blamed.
- November 21: USAF C-47A 43-15278 was written off at an unknown location.

== December ==
- December 6: Lineas Aereas Taxader Flight 209, a C-47 (HK-437) crashed 30 mi from Barrancabermeja, Colombia due to pilot error, killing all 26 on board.
- December 15: USAF C-47A 42-93086 crashed near Thule Air Base, Greenland while searching for a missing USAF F-102 (58-0264), killing two crew.
- December 17: An Aeroflot Li-2 (CCCP-71259) crashed at Kegostrov Airport following a premature descent; all 19 on board survived, but the aircraft was written off.

== See also ==
- List of accidents and incidents involving the DC-3 in the 1960s

== Notes ==
^Note A Military versions of the DC-3 were known as C-47 Skytrain, C-48, C-49, C-50, C-51, C-52, C-53 Skytrooper, C-68, C-84, C-117 Super Dakota and YC-129 by the United States Army Air Forces and as the R4D by the United States Navy. In Royal Air Force (and other British Commonwealth air forces') service, these aircraft were known as Dakotas.
