= List of accidents and incidents involving the DC-3 in 1940 =

This is a list of accidents and incidents involving Douglas DC-3 variants that have taken place in the year 1940, including aircraft based on the DC-3 airframe such as the Douglas C-47 Skytrain and Lisunov PS-84. Hijackings and incidents of terrorism are included, as are military accidents, although acts of war are outside the scope of this list.

August 7
An Aeroflot Lisunov PS-84 (registration CCCP-L3409) crashed near Novosibirsk in bad weather, killing 18 of 21 on board.
August 23
A LARES DC-3-227 (registration YR-PIF) struck Mount Gaina (southwest of Cluj-Napoca, Romania) in a hailstorm, killing 11 of 20 on board.
August 31
Pennsylvania-Central Airlines Trip 19 (a DC-3-313) crashed near Lovettsville, Virginia due to loss of control caused by a possible lightning strike, killing all 25 on board.
September 21
A BOAC Douglas DC-3-194B (registration G-AGBC) crashed while landing in fog at Heston Airport.
October 29
A Deutsche Luft Hansa DC-3-220 (registration D-AAIH, named Prag) crashed on takeoff from Tempelhof Airport, killing both pilots.
November 4
United Airlines Flight 16 (a DC-3-197, registration NC16086) struck Bountiful Peak due to navigational equipment failure while on an Oakland-Salt Lake City passenger service, killing all 10 on board.
November 23
An Aeroflot Lisunov PS-84 (registration CCCP-L3405) struck a mountain near Ordzhonikidze (now Vladikavkaz) in bad weather, killing four.
December 4
United Airlines Flight 21 (a DC-3A-197C, registration NC25678) stalled and crashed near Chicago due to wing icing, killing all three crew and seven of 13 passengers.

== See also ==
- List of accidents and incidents involving the DC-3 in the 1940s
