= List of accidents and incidents involving the DC-3 in 1952 =

This is a list of accidents and incidents involving the Douglas DC-3^{A} that occurred in 1952, including aircraft based on the DC-3 airframe such as the Douglas C-47 Skytrain and Lisunov Li-2. Military accidents are included; and hijackings and incidents of terrorism are covered, although acts of war involving military aircraft are outside the scope of this list.

== January ==
January 9
Aeroflot Flight 203, a Lisunov Li-2 (CCCP-Л4315), crashed while on approach to Stalingrad (now Volgograd) due to crew error, killing three of four crew; the aircraft was operating a Moscow-Voronezh-Stalingrad-Baku cargo service.
January 10
An Aer Lingus Dakota III (registration EI-AFL, named Saint Kevin) crashed at Cwn Edno due to a loss of control after entering a downdraft near the mountain, Moel Siabod, killing all 20 passengers, and a crew of three on board.
January 12
General Airways Flight 785 (a C-47A, registration N21748) disappeared while on a Portland-Annette Island-Anchorage-Merrill Field cargo service; the wreckage was found the next day on the side of Mount Crillon; both pilots died; improper navigation led to deviation from the planned course.

== February ==
February 4
A Sabena C-47A (registration OO-CBN) crashed near Kikwit, Belgian Congo due to propeller separation and resultant loss of control, killing all 16 on board.
February 19
A Deccan Airways C-47A (registration VT-AXE) crashed on landing at Sonegaon Airport due to pilot error and possible misread altimeter, killing three of 16 on board.
February 28
A Panair do Brasil DC-3A-393 (registration PP-PCN) struck trees at Uberlandia, Brazil due to pilot error while on a go-around, killing eight of 31 on board.

== March ==
March 10
A Philippine Airlines C-47A (registration PI-C5) struck a roof of a house and crashed at Lahug, Cebu while on a cargo service, killing all three on board.
March 22
A Maritime Central Airways C-47-DL (registration CF-BXZ) disappeared while on a Saint John-Goose Bay cargo service, killing all four on board; the wreckage was found on August 27, 1953.
March 30
A Philippine Airlines C-47A (registration PI-C270) crashed on takeoff from Loakan Airport, killing 10 of 29 on board.

== April ==
April 2
A Fred. Olsen Airtransport C-47A (registration LN-NAE) carried out a forced landing on a beach during approach to Bordeaux–Mérignac Airport, France, after experiencing engine difficulties and severe weather. There were no fatalities, but the aircraft was written off.
April 4
USAF VC-47D 45-926 collided in mid-air at night with Douglas C-124 Globemaster II 50-1260 near Brookley Air Force Base, killing all 15 on board both aircraft.
April 29
USAF C-47A 43-15379, of 21st Troop Carrier Squadron, crashed off "Dentist C", South Korea while on a Seoul to Cho-do Island evacuation flight, killing all eight on board.
April 30
A Deccan Airways C-47A (registration VT-AUN) crashed at Safdarjung Airport due to engine failure caused by possible fuel starvation, killing all nine on board.

== May ==
May 3
An Aeroflot Li-2 (registration CCCP-L4602) disappeared while on a Yakutsk-Khandyga-Allaiha cargo service with four crew on board; the wreckage was found on May 11, 1952 on a mountain 95 km (59 mi) northwest of Khandyga; pilot and ATC errors were blamed.
May 5
A Fred. Olsen Airtransport C-47A (registration LN-NAD) crashed 15 mi southwest of Skien, Norway due to "faulty navigation", killing 11 of 29 on board.
May 13
A VASP C-47B (registration PP-SPM) crashed at São Paulo due to engine failure, killing five of 22 on board.
May 19
A LOT Polish Airlines Li-2T (registration SP-LBD) crashed near Sowina, Poland.

== July ==
July 11
Brazilian Air Force C-47A FAB2048 crashed off Marau, Brazil due to an engine fire, killing 13 of 33 on board.
July 19
An Aeroflot Li-2 (registration CCCP-L4197) stalled and crashed during a training flight at Spilve Airport due to double engine failure caused by crew error, killing the four crew.

== August ==
August 12
A Transportes Aéreos Nacional C-47A (registration PP-ANH) crashed at Palmeiras de Goias, Brazil due to a bomb explosion, killing all 24 on board.
August 22
Hungarian Air Force Li-2T 210 crashed at Apácapuszta, Hungary due to an incorrect trim setting while performing one-engine maneuvers at night.

== September ==
September 28
An Aeroflot/Far East Li-2 (registration CCCP-L4673) disappeared with seven on board while being ferried from Khabarovsk to Tashkent (with stops at Krasnoyarsk and Novosibirsk) for repairs; the wreckage was accidentally found on Mount Kuznetsky Alatau in 1967; the crew was probably attempting a forced landing in icing conditions.

== October ==
October 2
A Maszovlet Li-2P (registration HA-LIL) struck a building after landing at Nyíregyháza Airport, killing three.
October 5
Aeroflot Flight 381 (a Douglas TS-62, registration CCCP-L1055) collided in mid-air with an Ilyushin Il-12 operating as Aeroflot Flight 376 (registration CCCP-L1328) over Skvoritsy, killing all 31 on board both aircraft.
October 7
A LOT Polish Airlines Li-2P (registration SP-LAO) crashed in Poland.

== November ==
November 14
An Li-2 (registration CCCP-X1011) operated by the Soviet Ministry of Internal Affairs stalled and crashed on takeoff from Nizhniye Kresty Airport due to insufficient takeoff speed; there were no casualties, but the aircraft was written off.
November 22
A TABSO Li-2P (registration LZ-TUE) struck Mount Vezhen in bad weather while on a Sofia-Gorna Orechovitsa-Varna passenger service, killing all 30 on board.

== December ==
December 1
United States Air Force C-47D 45-1124 crashed into the eastern face of the San Gorgonio Mountain in California while flying from Offutt Air Force Base to March Air Force Base in the middle of a snow storm, killing all 13 on board. On December 5, a United States Marines HRS-2 Helicopter crashed into the San Gorgonio Mountain while attempting to reach the crash site, all 3 on board survived. The wreckage of both aircraft still remain and are accessible via hiking trails.
December 4
Aeroflot Flight 688 (an Li-2T, registration CCCP-L4661) force-landed 25 km (16 mi) south of Eniseyska due to an overspeeding propeller caused by improper maintenance, killing three of 19 on board; the aircraft was operating a Dudinka-Yeniseysk-Krasnoyarsk passenger service.
December 12
Hungarian Air Force Li-2P 306 landed hard at Kunmadaras, Hungary in crosswinds; there were no casualties, but the aircraft was written off.
December 22
Hellenic Air Force C-47D 49-2612 was taxiing at Suwon Air Base, South Korea when it was struck by USAF Lockheed P-80 Shooting Star 49-0722 that was taking off, killing all 13 on board the C-47.
December 26
Hellenic Air Force C-47D 47-2622 crashed on climbout from Jinhae Air Base, South Korea after failing to gain height after takeoff, killing all 14 on board.
December 30
A Philippine Air Lines DC-3 (serial number PI-C38) was hijacked by a man with a .45-caliber revolver after take off from Laoag. He demanded the plane to be diverted to Amoy (now Xiamen), China. The pilot put the plane into a dive to knock the hijacker off balance. The hijacker kept his balance, however, and shot the captain dead. After the plane was stabilized by the co-pilot, a male flight attendant knocked at the cockpit door to investigate what was happening, but the hijacker shot him twice through the door, killing him. While flying along the mainland Chinese coast, two Chinese Nationalist T-6 Harvard planes fired at the plane. The co-pilot managed to escape the two fighters until more T-6s forced the plane to land on the island of Quemoy (now Kinmen), where the hijacker was arrested.

== See also ==
- List of accidents and incidents involving the DC-3 in the 1950s

== Notes ==
^Note A Military versions of the DC-3 were known as C-47 Skytrain, C-48, C-49, C-50, C-51, C-52, C-53 Skytrooper, C-68, C-84, C-117 Super Dakota and YC-129 by the United States Army Air Forces and as the R4D by the United States Navy. In Royal Air Force (and other British Commonwealth air forces') service, these aircraft were known as Dakotas.
