= List of accidents and incidents involving the DC-3 in 1958 =

This is a list of accidents and incidents involving the Douglas DC-3^{A} that occurred in 1958, including aircraft based on the DC-3 airframe such as the Douglas C-47 Skytrain and Lisunov Li-2. Military accidents are included; and hijackings and incidents of terrorism are covered, although acts of war involving military aircraft are outside the scope of this list.

== January ==
- January 3: A Varig Douglas DC-3 (registration PP-VDL) crashed at Porto Alegre, Brazil due to pilot error while on a training flight; both pilots survived, but the aircraft was written off.
- January 8: An Air France Douglas DC-3 (registration F-BAOA) crashed at Biard Airport, France due to landing gear and engine problems while on a training flight; all eight on board survived, but the aircraft was written off.
- January 16: An Interior Enterprise Douglas DC-3 (registration N75391) struck a ridge and crashed at Aklavik, Canada due to a navigation error; all three on board survived, but the aircraft was written off.
- January 21: A Transporte Aéreo Militar (the civil service of the Bolivian Air Force) Douglas DC-3 (registration TAM-04) crashed in the mountains while operating a Tipuani-La Paz passenger service, killing all 11 on board.

== February ==
- February 15: USAF Douglas VC-47A 42-93817 struck Mount Vesuvius, Italy while on a Ramstein AFB-Naples-Turkey service, killing all 16 on board.
- February 16: A Polyarnaya Aviatsiya Lisunov Li-2V (registration CCCP-N502) was written off at Mirny Ice Station after the pilot missed the runway when the tail skid locked up and got stuck; a tractor attempted to free the aircraft, but it broke through the ice and sank; the casualty count was unknown.

== March ==
- March 22: A Fleming Airways System Transport Douglas DC-3 (registration PI-C262) crashed on climbout from Bacolod Airport after the pilot lifted the aircraft too soon; all 40 on board survived, but the aircraft was written off.
- March 24: An Indian Airlines Douglas C-47A (registration VT-CYN) stalled and crashed near Kathmandu while en route due to a navigation error, killing all 20 on board.
- March 28: An Aeroflot Li-2 (CCCP-L4198) crashed at Spilve Airport, Latvia after it descended too low on final approach during a training flight; there were no casualties.

== April ==
- April 7: AREA Ecuador Flight 222 (a Douglas C-47A, registration HC-ACL) struck Cerro Illiniza due to pilot error, killing all 32 on board.
- April 10: A Douglas DC-3 (registration EC-ABN) force-landed near Palma de Mallorca due to engine problems on takeoff; there were no casualties, but the aircraft was written off.

== May ==
- May 31: An Air France Douglas C-47A (registration F-BHKV) crashed near Molière, Algeria while on a military charter flight from Algiers to Colomb Béchar, killing all 15 on board, although some sources put the death toll at 14.

== June ==
- June 4: Capital Airlines Flight 3 (a Douglas C-53B, registration N49553) crashed at Martinsburg Airport while on a training flight due to pilot error and mechanical failure; killing one of three crew on board.
- June 25: An Indian Airlines Douglas C-47A (registration VT-COJ) crashed near Mohanbari while on a Mohanbari-Damroh supply drop mission due to loss of control after the left wing grazed a hillside, killing five of seven on board.

== July ==
- July 9: An Indian Airlines Douglas C-47A (registration VT-CYM) broke apart in mid-air and crashed near Dhaka while on an Agartala-Dhaka cargo service, killing all three crew.
- July 13: Five Quebecair aircraft (four Douglas C-47A's and a Douglas C-48) were destroyed in a hangar fire while parked at Rimouski Airport; there were no casualties.

== August ==
- August 12: Argentine Air Force Douglas C-47B T-19 struck terrain after takeoff from Trelew Airport and crashed, killing all 12 on board.
- August 12: All Nippon Airways Flight 025 (a Douglas C-53, registration JA5045) crashed off the Izu Islands en route to Nagoya from Tokyo, killing all 33 on board.

== September ==
- September 9: USAF Douglas SC-47 43-15345 crashed on takeoff from Elmendorf Air Force Base due to engine problems, killing 13 of 20 on board.

== October ==
- October 15: A Transporte Aéreo Militar Douglas C-47A (registration TAM-03) struck a mountain near Villa Montes while on a Fortin Campero-Tarija passenger service, killing all 20 on board.

== November ==
- November 8: A Transporte Aéreo Militar Douglas DC-3 (registration TAM-05) disappeared on a cargo flight from San Borja to El Alto International Airport, La Paz. Three members of crew were lost in the accident.

== See also ==
- List of accidents and incidents involving the DC-3 in the 1950s

== Notes ==
^Note A Military versions of the DC-3 were known as C-47 Skytrain, C-48, C-49, C-50, C-51, C-52, C-53 Skytrooper, C-68, C-84, C-117 Super Dakota and YC-129 by the United States Army Air Forces and as the R4D by the United States Navy. In Royal Air Force (and other British Commonwealth air forces') service, these aircraft were known as Dakotas.
