= List of accidents and incidents involving the DC-3 in the 1930s =

This is a list of accidents and incidents involving the Douglas Sleeper Transport (DST) and Douglas DC-3 that occurred in the period from the first flight of the prototype in 1935 to 1939. The first variant of the DC-3 to fly was a DST, on 17 December 1935; the DST and DC-3 entered production the following year and the first of the type to crash was a DC-3, in 1937. Military accidents and incidents of sabotage are included, although acts of war are outside the scope of this list.

== 1937 ==
February 9
A DC-3A-197 (registration NC16073) operating as United Airlines Flight 23 from Burbank to Mills Field Municipal Airport (now San Francisco International Airport) crashed into San Francisco Bay during landing approach. The first officer accidentally dropped his microphone which jammed the elevator controls, killing all 11 on board in the first loss of a DC-3.
April 3
A DC-3-194B (registration PH-ALP, named Pluvier) struck Mount Baldy, Arizona on its delivery flight to KLM, killing all eight on board.
October 6
A KLM DC-3-194B (registration PH-ALS, named Specht) crashed after takeoff from Betoetoe Aerodrome in the Dutch East Indies, killing four of the twelve occupants.
October 17
A DC-3A-197 (registration NC16074) operating as United Airlines Flight 1 struck a mountain 20 miles (32 km) south of Knight, Wyoming in bad weather, killing all 19 on board. A combination of radio failure, poor ground visibility and the weather was the cause of the crash.

== 1938 ==
May 24
A DST-A-207A (registration NC18108) operating as United Airlines Flight 9 crashed near Cleveland Municipal Airport following an engine fire, killing all 10 on board.
July 15
A Pan American World Airways DC-3-228 (registration NC18114) crashed on climbout from Morón, Argentina; the aircraft impacted the side of a hospital building. All 13 on board survived. However, a person on the ground died.
November 14
A KLM DC-3-194D (registration PH-ARY, named Ijsvogel) struck terrain and crashed on approach to Amsterdam's Schiphol Airport en route from Berlin, killing 6 of the 19 people on board; the cause was not determined.
November 29
A DC-3A-191 (registration NC16066) operating as United Airlines Flight 6 ditched off Point Reyes, California due to fuel exhaustion after the crew experienced navigation problems. The only survivors among the seven occupants were one pilot and a passenger.

== See also ==
- List of accidents and incidents involving the DC-3
