= List of accidents and incidents involving the DC-3 in 1942 =

This is a list of accidents and incidents involving Douglas DC-3 variants that have taken place in the year 1942, including aircraft based on the DC-3 airframe such as the Douglas C-47 Skytrain and Lisunov Li-2. Hijackings and incidents of terrorism are covered, as are military accidents, although acts of war are outside the scope of this list.

January 13
An Aeroflot Lisunov PS-84 (CCCP-L3438) crashed near Smelovka, Russia following an in-flight fire, killing two of six on board; the five crew bailed out at 350 m (1,150 ft) (although one did not survive); the sole passenger was unable to bail out. The aircraft was on a flight from Morozovski to an area behind German lines.
January 16
TWA Flight 3 (a Douglas DC-3-382) struck Potosi Mountain due to deviation from course caused by pilot error, killing all 22 on board, including American actress Carole Lombard and her mother.
January 25
An Aeroflot PS-84 (CCCP-L3479) crashed near Molotov Airport after several landing attempts in heavy snow and poor visibility; all nine on board survived, but the aircraft was written off.
March 10
A Douglas DC-3-270 (registration NC21750)(Also reported as USAF 42-38257) burned out while parked at Khartoum, Sudan; the aircraft was operated by Pan Am's African division.
March 22
An Aeroflot PS-84 (CCCP-L3975) went missing near Medyn with six on board while on a flight from Monino to an area behind German lines.
April 15
A USAAF DC-3A-269C (registration NC25623) was reportedly destroyed at an unknown location.
April 19
A USAAF C-49H (serial number 42-38254) crashed on takeoff from Hastings Airport, killing 20.
April 21
A USAAF C-50A (serial number 41-7710) stalled and crashed near Pope AAF, North Carolina, killing at least one.
May 1
United Airlines Flight 4 (a Douglas DST-A-207A, registration NC18146) struck a mountain near Salt Lake City while on approach for landing due to an unexplained course change, killing all 17 on board.
May 6
Two Royal Air Force C-49 Dakota LR230 and LR231 destroyed in a Japanese air attack at Mytikyina, Burma.
May 12
Northwest Airlines Flight 1 (a Douglas DC-3A-269, registration NC21714) overran the runway on landing at Miles City Municipal Airport and crashed while attempting to go-around, killing three of 14 on board.
June 16
A USAAF C-53 Skytrooper (serial number 41-20069) went missing over the Pacific Ocean.
June 18
An Aeroflot PS-84 (CCCP-L3423) crashed shortly after takeoff from Khodynka Aerodrome due to engine problems leading to engine failure, killing 12 of 21 on board; one person on the ground also died when the aircraft crashed near the Moscow-Butyrskaya tovarnaya railway station.
June 18
An Aeroflot PS-84 (CCCP-L3484) went into a dive and crashed near Yelets in bad weather, killing five of seven on board. The aircraft was returning from a partisan airstrip in Trubchevsky District, Bryansk Region, behind German lines.
June 19
An Aeroflot PS-84 (CCCP-L3447) crashed near Novosibirsk shortly after takeoff during a training flight due to engine failure caused by crew error, killing one of four on board.
June 24
A USAAF C-49F (serial number 42-56621) crashed at Camp Williams, Wisconsin following a mid-air collision with USAAF C-48B 42-56611, killing three.
August 15
A USAAF C-53 Skytrooper (serial number 42-6463) struck trees on a mountainside near Garnet Peak in Peru, Massachusetts, killing 16 of 19 on board (initial reports indicated 17 of 20 perished).
August 23
A USAAF Douglas C-47 (serial number 41-7803) of 14th Fighter Group struck Moel-y-Gaer Mountain, Wales, United Kingdom while descending through bad weather; killing 12 of 13 on board (only a passenger survived).
September 7
A Mexicana de Aviacion Douglas DC-3A-228 (registration XA-CAB) crashed at Nuevo Laredo, Mexico.
September 19
A USAAF C-47 (serial number 41-18485) crashed 100 feet below the peak of Blue Mountain in the Kittakinny Ridge (8 km (5.0 mi) west of Blairstown, New Jersey), killing the seven crew.
September 23
A USAAF C-53 (serial number 41-20112) went missing between Kunming and Chabua.
October 9
A USN Douglas R4D-1 (serial number 01981) struck a mountain in New Caledonia, killing eight.
October 23
American Airlines Flight 28 (Douglas DC-3-178 NC16017 "Connecticut") collided in mid-air with USAAF Lockheed B-34 Ventura 2A 41-38116 near Palm Springs, California killing all 12 on board the DC-3, including American composer Ralph Rainger; the B-34 landed safely with minor damage.
November 17
A China National Aviation Corporation Douglas C-47-DL (registration 60) disappeared over the Himalayas while being ferried from Kunming to Dinjan with three on board; the wreckage was discovered on a mountain in Yunnan Province, China in 2011.
November 17
An Aeroflot Lisunov Li-2 (registration CCCP-L3965) crashed shortly after takeoff from Krasnoyarsk Airport due to overloading and wing icing, killing all 20 on board.
November 18
A United Airlines DC-3A-191 (registration NC16064) crashed on landing at Wright-Patterson Army Air Base. The aircraft was operating for the USAAF Air Transport Command.
December 8
An Aeroflot PS-84 (CCCP-L5805) was being delivered to the Soviet Air Force when it crashed into Mount Menshy Brat, Uzbekistan due to a loss of altitude while flying in low cloud and icing conditions, killing all eight on board.
December 15
Western Air Lines Flight 1 (a Douglas DC-3A-191, registration NC16060) crashed near Fairfield, Utah after performing a violent maneuver for reasons unknown, of the 19 on board, only two passengers survived.
December 22
An Aeroflot PS-84 (CCCP-L3903) stalled and crashed near Yanaul while attempting a go-around following an aborted approach, killing 10 of 12 on board. The aircraft was operating a Moscow-Kazan-Sverdlovsk passenger service.

== See also ==
- List of accidents and incidents involving the DC-3 in the 1940s
