= List of accidents and incidents involving the DC-3 in 1960 =

This is a list of accidents and incidents involving the Douglas DC-3^{A} that occurred in 1960, including aircraft based on the DC-3 airframe such as the Douglas C-47 Skytrain and Lisunov Li-2. Military accidents are included; and hijackings and incidents of terrorism are covered, although acts of war involving military aircraft are outside the scope of this list.

Date	Type	Operator	Call sign	Fatalities	Info
January 3, 1960	Douglas C-47A	Indian Airlines	VT-CGG	9	Crashed near Taksing, India while on a supply drop mission, killing all nine on board. The accident was caused by a navigation error, causing the pilot to enter a wrong valley.
January 6, 1960	Douglas R4D-8	U.S. Navy	17154	—	Crashed while attempting to land at Byrd Station, Antarctica in whiteout conditions; there were no casualties, but the aircraft was written off.
February 25, 1960	Douglas C-47A	Real Transportes Aéreos	PP-AXD	26	Collided in mid-air with US Navy Douglas C-118 131582 over Rio de Janeiro, Brazil, killing all 26 on board the C-47 and 35 on board the C-118. The C-47 was operating a domestic scheduled passenger flight from Campos to Rio de Janeiro.
March 5, 1960	Douglas C-47A	Don Everall Aviation	G-AMSF	None	Crashed on takeoff from Birmingham Airport due to engine failure; all three crew and 28 passengers survived, but the aircraft was written off.
March 16, 1960	Douglas C-47-DL	All Nippon Airways	JA5018	3	Collided on the runway at Nagoya with JASDF F-86D Sabre 94-8137, killing three of 33 on the C-47; the F-86 pilot survived.
April 12, 1960	Douglas C-53	Varig	PP-CDS	10	Collided with two other aircraft, crashed and caught fire after it deviated to the right on take-off and an over correction caused a sharp turn to the left. Of the 22 passengers and crew aboard, 10 died.
April 28, 1960	Douglas C-47B	Linea Aeropostal Venezolana	YV-C-AFE	13	Crashed near Calabozo after a bomb exploded on board, killing all three crew and 10 passengers on board.
July 10, 1960	Douglas C-47-DL	Gulf Aviation	VT-DGS	16	Disappeared in the vicinity of Sharjah, UAE on a scheduled domestic passenger flight, from Doha Airport, Qatar to Sharjah Airport. Three members of crew and 13 passengers were lost in the accident. The aircraft was leased from Kalinga Airlines.
July 11, 1960	Douglas C-47B	U.S. Navy	45-1109	18	Crashed into Pichincha Volcano near Quito, Ecuador while operating an international non-scheduled passenger flight from Bogota to Quito, killing all 18 on board.
July 14, 1960	Douglas C-47A	Philippine Airlines	PI-C16	None	Ditched off Mindanao due to fuel exhaustion after the crew diverted to Cebu due to bad weather at Zamboanga; all three crew and 28 passengers survived, but the aircraft was written off.
July 15, 1960	Douglas C-47A	Ethiopian Air Lines	ET-T-18	1	Crashed into a mountain near Jimma, Ethiopia, killing the pilot.
August 1, 1960	Douglas C-47-DL	Transporte Aéreo Militar	TAM-09	6	Crashed into Hayti Mountain near Tipuani, Bolivia en route from La Paz, killing all six on board.
August 25, 1960	Lisunov Li-2P	LOT Polish Airlines	SP-LAL	6	Crashed near Tczew, Poland while on a survey flight over the Vistula River floods, killing six.
September 28, 1960	Douglas C-53-DO	Mexicana de Aviación	XA-HUS	8	Crashed into a mountain in fog near Juchetipec, killing eight of 18 on board.
October 8, 1960	Lisunov Li-2	Tarom	YR-TAX	—	Crashed at Mironeasa-Iassy, Romania.
November 5, 1960	Douglas C-47A	Royal Nepal Airlines	9N-AAD	4	Crashed on takeoff from Bhairawa Airport, killing all four on board.
November 11, 1960	Lisunov Li-2	Aeroflot	CCCP-84748	5	Crashed on takeoff from Zyryanka Airport, killing five of six on board.
November 22, 1960	R4D Skytrain	U.S. Navy	—	None	Flew into the Crary Mountains after drifting off course in thick cloud. The aircraft took evasive action, avoiding a crash with around fifty feet clearance, but one wingtip collided with a mountain peak and the aircraft returned damaged.
November 23, 1960	Douglas DC-3C	Philippine Airlines	PI-C133	33	Disappeared on an Iloilo to Manila service with 33 on board; the wreckage was found on Mount Baco a week later; a navigation error was blamed.
December 12, 1960	Douglas C-47A	Airlines of New South Wales	VH-INI	3	Crashed off Sydney for reasons unknown while on a training flight, killing the three crew.
December 22, 1960	Douglas C-47A	Philippine Airlines	PI-C126	28	Crashed on takeoff from Cebu Airport due to engine failure, killing 28 of 37 on board.

== See also ==
- List of accidents and incidents involving the DC-3 in the 1960s

== Notes ==
^Note A Military versions of the DC-3 were known as C-47 Skytrain, C-48, C-49, C-50, C-51, C-52, C-53 Skytrooper, C-68, C-84, C-117 Super Dakota and YC-129 by the United States Army Air Forces and as the R4D by the United States Navy. In Royal Air Force (and other British Commonwealth air forces') service, these aircraft were known as Dakotas.
