= List of accidents and incidents involving the DC-3 in 1965 =

This is a list of accidents and incidents involving the Douglas DC-3^{A} that occurred in 1965, including aircraft based on the DC-3 airframe such as the Douglas C-47 Skytrain and Lisunov Li-2. Military accidents are included; and hijackings and incidents of terrorism are covered, although acts of war involving military aircraft are outside the scope of this list.

== January ==
- January 11: A US Navy Douglas LC-47J (registration 50778) crashed at Shackleton Glacier, Antarctica after striking an obstacle on landing; there were no casualties, but the aircraft was written off.
- January 21: A Douglas C-53 (registration PI-C945) operated by Filipinas Orient Airways crashed on landing at San Jose, Philippines after the right main landing gear collapsed; there were no casualties, but the aircraft was written off.

== February ==
- February 14: A Douglas DC-3 (registration JA5080) operated by All Nippon Airways struck Mount Nakanoone, killing both pilots.
- February 20: A Douglas C-47A (registration YU-ACB) operated by JAT Yugoslav Airlines crashed near Belgrade while on a training flight, killing all five crew on board.

== March ==
- March 8: Fairways Flight 43 (a Douglas DC-3A, registration PI-C948) struck Mount Tangcong Vaca en route to Naga from Manila, killing ten of 12 on board.
- March 11: A Douglas C-47-DL (registration HK-153) operated by Avianca crashed on takeoff from Bucaramanga, Colombia; there were no casualties, but the aircraft was written off.
- March 16: A Douglas C-47A (registration CF-PQG) operated by the Canada Department of Transport crashed at Blanc Sablon Airport after a loss of control on takeoff; all nine on board survived, but the aircraft was written off.
- March 18: A Douglas DC-3C (registration N4997E) operated by Miami Aviation was being ferried from Miami to Manila when it crashed off Clarenville, Newfoundland, Canada after an undetermined emergency, killing both pilots.
- March 22: Avianca Flight 676 (a Douglas C-47-DL, registration HK-109) struck Pan de Azucar Peak due to pilot error, killing all 29 on board.
- March 25: A USAF Douglas C-47 collided in mid-air with a North American T-39 (62-4458) over Angeles City, Philippines, presumably killing seven.
- March 26: A Douglas C-47B (registration VR-AAA) operated by Aden Airways crashed on landing at Hadibo, Yemen; all 17 on board survived, but the aircraft was written off.
- March 26: A Douglas C-47A (registration AP-AAH) operated by Pakistan International Airlines crashed near Lowery Pass, Pakistan, killing 22 of 26 on board.

== April ==
- April 1: Airlines of NSW Flight 1 (a Douglas C-47-DL, registration VH-ANJ) crashed at Warrnambool Airport, Victoria, Australia; all 23 on board survived, but the aircraft was written off.
- April 6: A private Douglas C-47-DL (registration N150A) ditched off Andros Island, Bahamas due to engine failure, all seven on board survived, but the aircraft was written off.
- April 14: British United Airways Flight 1030X (a Douglas DC-3, registration G-ANTB) crashed at Jersey, Channel Islands due to pilot error, killing 26 of 27 on board (only a flight attendant survived).

== May ==
- May 29: A Douglas C-47A (registration N91016) operated by Reeve Aleutian Airways stalled and crashed at Nikolski Air Force Station after a wind gust caused the aircraft to lift off too soon; all five on board survived, but the aircraft was written off.
- May 29: An RAF Douglas Dakota (registration KJ955) was bombed while parked at RAF Khormaksar, Yemen; no casualties.

== September ==
- September 11: Filipinas Orient Airways Flight 60 (a Douglas DC-3A, registration PI-C942) struck Mount Kantakan en route to Bacolod from Cebu, killing all ten on board; the wreckage was found a week later; pilot error is blamed.
- September 14: A Douglas C-47A (registration ET-ABI) operated by Ethiopian Airlines crashed at Gore Airport, killing 17.
- September 16: A Douglas C-47A (registration XV-NIC) operated by Air Vietnam was shot down on takeoff by Communist fire and crashed near Quang Ngai, Vietnam, killing all 39 on board in Vietnam's worst air accident at the time.
- September 16: A Douglas C-47B (registration HC-AFQ) operated by Transportes Aereos Orientales struck a hillside in heavy rain due to pilot error, killing nine of 11 on board.

== October ==
- October 6: A US Navy Douglas LC-47H (registration 17239) crashed on takeoff from McMurdo Station after a ski cable slipped and caused the right ski to get stuck; there were no casualties but the aircraft was written off.
- October 17: A Douglas DC-3S (registration HK-118) operated by Avianca collided in mid-air with a Piper Super Cub 150 (HK-922P) over Bucaramanga, Colombia, killing all 19 on board both aircraft.
- October 17: A Douglas C-47A (registration VT-AUQ) operated by Kalinga Airlines crashed 23 mi north of Mohanbari, India while on a supply drop mission, killing all eight on board.
- October 20: Philippine Airlines Flight 741 (a Douglas C-47A, registration PI-C144) crashed on takeoff from Manila due to pilot error and overloading, killing one of 37 on board.

== November ==
- November 8: A Douglas C-47-DL (registration HK-1202) operated by Taxi Aereo Opita crashed near Cerro del Diablo, Colombia due to pilot error, killing 26 of 36 on board.
- November 27: Edde Airlines Flight 65/75 (a Douglas DC-3A, registration N485) struck a hill 35 mi south of Salt Lake City, Utah due to pilot error, killing all 13 on board.

== December ==
- December 5: A US Navy Douglas LC-47H (registration 17107) crashed in the Horlick Mountains, Antarctica after the landing gear collapsed on landing; there were no casualties, but the aircraft was written off.
- December 7, 18:40 local time: A few minutes after taking off from Tenerife Los Rodeos en route to Las Palmas, Gran Canaria, a Spantax DC-3, registered as EC-ARZ entered a spin and crashed near El Ortigal de Arriba, Tenerife, killing 4 Crew and 28 Passengers.
- December 16: Air Manila International Flight 101 (a Douglas DC-3A, registration PI-C856) crashed on takeoff from Manila after the aircraft stalled while making a turn at low altitude, killing two of 21 on board.
- December 24: A USAF Douglas AC-47 Spooky (registration 45-1120, callsign "Spooky 21") went missing with six on board while on a reconnaissance/strike mission over Laos; the aircraft was located in 1995 and the crew's remains in 2010 and 2011.

== See also ==
- List of accidents and incidents involving the DC-3 in the 1960s

== Notes ==
^Note A Military versions of the DC-3 were known as C-47 Skytrain, C-48, C-49, C-50, C-51, C-52, C-53 Skytrooper, C-68, C-84, C-117 Super Dakota and YC-129 by the United States Army Air Forces and as the R4D by the United States Navy. In Royal Air Force (and other British Commonwealth air forces') service, these aircraft were known as Dakotas.
