= List of accidents and incidents involving the DC-3 in 1963 =

This is a list of accidents and incidents involving the Douglas DC-3 that occurred in 1963, including aircraft based on the DC-3 airframe such as the Douglas C-47 Skytrain and Lisunov Li-2. Military accidents are included; and hijackings and incidents of terrorism are covered, although acts of war involving military aircraft are outside the scope of this list.

== July ==
- July 3. A DC3 operated by New Zealand National Airways Corporation, flew into a vertical rock face on the Kaimai Ranges. See New Zealand National Airways Corporation Flight 441
- A DC-3 from VARIG, collided with trees on high ground and crashed in Passo Fundo, Brazil. The flight took off from Porto Alegre and the final destination was Erechim both cities are located in Rio Grande do Sul, in the southern Brazil. A report to discover the accident's cause was never made but the probable cause was error of judgement on the part of the pilot in attempting to fly visually in unfavourable weather condition (fog) during twilight.

== November ==
- Aero Flight 217, Douglas C-47A-35-DL (DC-3) aircraft (OH-LCA) of Aero O/Y, near Mariehamn Airport in Jomala, Åland, Finland, on 8 November 1963. There were a total of 25 people on board, including one deadheading pilot. The accident was a controlled flight into terrain on final landing approach in bad weather and poor visibility due to a faulty altimeter. Of the 25 on board, two passengers and the flight hostess survived.

== See also ==
- List of accidents and incidents involving the DC-3 in the 1960s
