= List of accidents and incidents involving the DC-3 in 1948 =

This is a list of accidents and incidents involving Douglas DC-3 ^{A} variants that have taken place in the year 1948, including aircraft based on the DC-3 airframe such as the Douglas C-47 Skytrain and Lisunov Li-2. Military accidents are included; and hijackings and incidents of terrorism are covered, although acts of war are outside the scope of this list.

== January ==
January 6
An Air France DC-3D (registration F-BAXC) struck trees and crashed while on approach to Le Bourget Airport due to weather and pilot error, killing all 16 on board.
January 7
A Coastal Air Lines C-47A (registration NC60331) stalled and crashed 10 mi north-northeast of Savannah, Georgia after both engines failed due to fuel exhaustion, killing 18 of 27 on board.
January 7
An RAF Dakota C.4, KN553, overran the runway at RAF Waterbeach while performing a single engine approach; there were no casualties, but the aircraft was written off.
January 10
An RAF Dakota C.4, KN426, force-landed 25 mi northwest of Cairo, Egypt after an engine suffered an uncontained failure and fell off the wing; there were no casualties, but the aircraft was written off.
January 11
A Dominicana de Aviacion C-47-DL (registration HI-6) struck a mountain near Yamasá due to weather and a navigation error, killing all 32 on board, including the entire B.B.C Santiago baseball team.
January 13
Eastern Air Lines Flight 572 (a DC-3-201F, registration NC28384) crashed at Oxon Hill, Maryland after the pilot deviated from the instrument procedure and flew too low, killing five of nine on board.
January 21
A Civil Aeronautics Administration C-47-DL (registration NC206) struck Navajo Peak near Ward, Colorado due to turbulence from a downdraft, killing the three crew; the wreckage was located on May 23, 1948.
January 27
A TAP Air Portugal C-47A-50-DL (DC-3) (registered as CS-TDB) was conducting a training flight over Lisbon in adverse weather when the plane lost control and crashed in Monte da Caparica. All 3 people on board were killed.: On the same day, A USAF C-47B struck the side of Montagne du Cheval-Blanc due to weather, killing all 11 on board; three days later, a B-17 searching for survivors crashed at the same location, killing nine of 10 on board.
January 28
An Airline Transport Carriers C-47B (registration NC36480) crashed in the Diablo Mountains after a wing separated due to an in-flight fire caused by a fuel leak; killing all 32 on board. The aircraft was operating for the US Immigration and Naturalization Service.

== February ==
February 12
A DDL C-53-DO (registration OY-DCI) crashed on approach to Frankfurt, killing 12 of 21 on board.
February 20
An Aerea Teseo C-47-DL (registration I-REGI) struck a hill at Collesalvetti after the pilot deviated briefly from the route, killing seven of 10 on board.
February 25
A Bruning Aviation C-47A (registration NC36498) crashed while on approach to Columbus, Ohio, killing one of two crew on board; the aircraft had been flying too low.

== March ==
March 2
A Sabena DC-3D (registration OO-AWH) crashed at Heathrow Airport due to pilot error, killing 20 of 22 on board.
March 7
A Polyarnaya Aviatsiya Li-2 (CCCP-N444) disappeared while on a Dudinka-Anderma passenger service with 20 on board; the wreckage was found on September 17, 1950; the aircraft had struck the side of a mountain.
March 8
An Eagle Air Freight C-47A (registration NC64722) was being ferried from Seattle to San Francisco when it struck Mount Hamiliton after the pilot deviated from clearance and instrument procedure, killing both pilots.
March 16
A Polyarnaya Aviatsiya Li-2 (CCCP-N456) crashed on takeoff after the aircraft got bogged down in snow during the takeoff run at Vorkuta Airport; all six crew on board survived, but the aircraft was written off. The aircraft was operating a search and rescue flight to attempt to locate Li-2 CCCP-N444 which had disappeared a week earlier.

== April ==
April 6
An RAF Dakota C.4, KN382, was parked at RAF Oakington when it struck RAF Dakota KN416 due to brake failure; there were no casualties, but both aircraft were written off.
April 21
An Aeroflot C-47B (registration CCCP-L1215) crashed on a railway embankment near Chita due to engine problems, killing three of six on board. The aircraft was on a rescue mission for an Li-2 (CCCP-L4279) that had force-landed near Tynda.
April 23
An Aeroflot Li-2T (registration CCCP-L4437) crashed on takeoff from Khabarovsk Airport after the aircraft swerved on takeoff due to an improperly set rudder, killing one of 16 on board.
April 24
An Aeroflot Li-2T (registration CCCP-L4460) crashed on a frozen river in heavy snow near Bodaybo, Russia after the crew (who was drunk) deviated from the flight path and reduced altitude, killing 28 of 29 on board.

== May ==
May 15
A Mercury Aviation Services C-49K (registration ZS-BWY, named City of Durban) struck Spitzkop mountain in the Witkoppens Mountains, South Africa after going off course in bad weather, killing all 13 on board.
May 20
An Air Transport Charter Dakota III (registration G-AJBG) crashed near Bovingdon after the aircraft lost altitude for reasons unknown, killing three of four crew.
May 22
An Aeroflot/Far East C-47 (registration CCCP-L1073) struck a hill near Magadan due to ATC errors, killing eight of nine on board. The aircraft was operating a Petropavlovsk-Kamchatsky – Magadan service.
May 26
A LOT Polish Airlines Li-2T (registration SP-LBC) was written off near Popowice, Poland.

== June ==
June 4
One crew member and a passenger armed with guns hijack a JUSTA DC-3 and force the pilot to fly to Italy.

== July ==
July 24
A Rimouski Airlines Dakota crashed near Cap des Rosiers in the Gaspé Peninsula, because of the fog. It was the first accident of a civilian airliner in Québec.

== August ==
August 24
Two USAF C-47A's (43-16036 and 43-15116) collided in mid-air near Ravolzhausen during the Berlin Airlift, killing all four on board both aircraft.

== September ==
September 2
Australian National Airways Flight 331, a C-47A (registration VH-ANK, named Lutana) crashed near Nundle, New South Wales after straying off course, killing all 13 on board.
September 4
Aeroflot Flight 253, an Li-2 (CCCP-L4498), crashed on takeoff from Bykovo Airport after the pilot became disorientated in the darkness, killing six of 24 on board. Insufficient rest of the crew before the flight was also blamed. The aircraft was operating a Moscow-Kharkov-Simferopol passenger service.
September 16
A Polyarnaya Aviatsiya Li-2T (CCCP-N464) disappeared while on an ice reconnaissance flight with seven on board; during a mission the crew encountered bad weather and poor visibility. The crew lost orientation and deviated west by 210 km (130 mi). The aircraft was low on fuel and the pilot decided to head for Novaya Zemlya, but the pilot remained disorientated and missed Novaya Zemlya while flying through the Kara Straits. Fifteen hours later the aircraft ran out of fuel and ditched in the Barents Sea off Cape Medynski Zavorot. None of the crew survived.
September 20
Colonial Airlines DC-3 NC17335 overshot during landing and hits trees at Burling, Vermont, United States.

== October ==
October 5
New England Air Express Co., NC58121 C‑47B‑DK 34353, ran out of gas, Berry Island 60 miles northwest of Nassau, landing was made in shallow water, rescue planes sighted the group 12 hours later, amphibian planes evacuated the 23 survivors (19 passengers, 4 crew, no fatalities, unknown injuries) as darkness fell. Resultant damage only to propellers, but surf destroyed it later.
October 12
An Aeroflot/East Siberia Li-2T (registration CCCP-L4658) crashed near Parshino, Russia after both engines failed due to fuel starvation caused by contaminated fuel, killing the four crew.
October 25
An Aeroflot/Georgia Li-2 (registration CCCP-L4500) struck a mountain and crashed near Samurskaya, Russia after the crew (who was drunk, having had vodka during lunch) followed the incorrect procedure climb, killing all 18 on board; the wreckage was found on August 8, 1949.

== November ==
November 1
A Polyarnaya Aviatsiya Li-2 (registration CCCP-N494) stalled and crashed while attempting a forced landing on the ice on Bukhta Kozhevnikova following engine failure, killing the six crew. The aircraft was operating a Kresty Kolymskiye-Ust Yansk-Mys Kosistyy cargo flight.
November 4
A Pacific Air Alaska Express (registration NC66637) disappeared off Cape Spencer, Alaska with 17 on board; the cause was never determined since no wreckage was found.
November 8
An Australian National Airways DC-3-232 (registration VH-UZH) struck Mount Macedon after the pilot deviated from the course and failed to comply with VFR requirements, killing three of 23 on board.
November 18
An Aeroflot/Tajikistan Li-2 (registration CCCP-L4275) struck a mountain near Leninabad (now Khujand) after being blown off course in strong winds, killing four of the five crew. The aircraft was operating a Stalinabad-Leninabad-Lyubertsy cargo service.
November 22
An Aeroflot/Yakutsk Li-2 (registration CCCP-L4463) crashed on landing on the frozen Kolyma River and sank, killing 23 of 26 on board.
November 26
A Pakistan Airways C-47A (registration AP-ACE) crashed at Vehari, Pakistan due to an in-flight fire, killing all 21 on board.

== December ==
December 21
An Li-2 (registration CCCP-Zh115) operated by the Soviet Ministry of Internal Affairs struck a mountain in the Polar Urals in bad weather, killing all 19 on board.
December 21
CSA Flight 584 (a C-47A, registration OK-WDN) crashed into a hillside near Pilos, Greece in bad weather, killing all 24 on board. One report stated the aircraft was shot down by small-arms fire from the ground when the pilot ignited a flare while a third report stated that communist insurgents thought the aircraft was dropping weapons and lit flares to signal a landing area for parachutes, but as the aircraft descended it struck the hill.
December 23
An Aeroflot TS-62^{B} (registration CCCP-L861) was being ferried from Vnukovo Airport to Bykovo Airport when it collided with an Aeroflot Il-12 (CCCP-L1731) that was being ferried from Moscow to Tashkent, killing all 12 on board both aircraft.
December 28
An Airborne Transport DST-144 (DC-3) disappeared off Florida with 32 on board; the wreckage has never been found.
December 30
An Aeroflot TS-62 (registration CCCP-L1017) was being ferried from Minsk to Moscow after repairs when it crashed on climbout from Minsk-1 Airport for reasons unknown, killing three of four crew. The aircraft was being repaired after a landing accident at Minsk on December 4, 1948.

== See also ==
- List of accidents and incidents involving the DC-3 in the 1940s

== Notes ==
^Note A Military versions of the DC-3 were known as C-47 Skytrain, C-48, C-49, C-50, C-51, C-52, C-53 Skytrooper, C-68, C-84, C-117 Super Dakota and YC-129 by the United States Army Air Forces and as the R4D by the United States Navy. In Royal Air Force (and other British Commonwealth air forces') service, these aircraft were known as Dakotas.

^Note B A Douglas TS-62 was a Douglas-built airframe that was re-engined with Shvetsov ASh-62 engines.
