= List of accidents and incidents involving the DC-3 in 1953 =

This is a list of accidents and incidents involving the Douglas DC-3^{A} that occurred in 1953, including aircraft based on the DC-3 airframe such as the Douglas C-47 Skytrain and Lisunov Li-2. Military accidents are included; and hijackings and incidents of terrorism are covered, although acts of war involving military aircraft are outside the scope of this list.

January 1
An Aer Lingus Douglas DC-3C (registration EI-ACF, named St. Kieran) force-landed at Spernall, United Kingdom due to engine failure and fuel starvation while on a Dublin-Birmingham service; all 25 on board survived, but the aircraft was written off.
January 23
A Dalstroi Aviation Li-2 (registration CCCP-Zh125) crashed on takeoff from Batagay Airport; all five crew on board survived, but the aircraft was written off.
January 26
A Linee Aeree Italiane Douglas C-47-DL (registration I-LAIL) crashed at Mount Sinnai after the left wing separated in flight, killing all 19 on board.
March 17
An Aigle Azur C-47A (registration F-BEFG) crashed while on approach to Da Nang Airport in bad weather, killing all eight on board.
April 14
A Miami Airline DC-3C (registration N65743) crashed near Selleck, Washington due to double engine failure caused by improper maintenance, killing seven of 25 on board.
April 16
An Aigle Azur C-47A (registration F-BESS) crashed 94 mi northwest of Hanoi after a wing separated soon after takeoff, killing all 30 on board. The aircraft was operating a Hanoi-Na San military charter flight.
May 9
An Air India C-47A (registration VT-AUD) crashed near Delhi while en route to Ahmedabad due to pilot error, killing all 18 on board.
May 17
Delta Air Lines Flight 318 (a DC-3DST-318, registration N28345) crashed 13 mi east of Marshall, Texas after entering a downdraft in a thunderstorm, killing 19 of 20 on board (only a passenger survived). The aircraft was operating a Dallas-Shreveport-Atlanta service.
May 24
A Meteor Air Transport DC-3C (registration N35396) was being ferried from Teterboro to St. Louis when it crashed at Lambert International Airport due to fuel exhaustion and loss of control caused by crew error, killing six of seven on board (only a passenger survived).
May 27
Aeroflot Flight 18 (an Li-2, registration CCCP-Л4534) collided in mid-air with an Aeroflot Li-2T (CCCP-А4031) near Kemerovo, killing all 27 on board both aircraft. CCCP-А4031 was operating an aerial photography flight; CCCP-Л4534 was operating an Irkutsk-Krasnoyarsk-Novosibirsk passenger service.
June 16
An Aigle Azur C-47A (registration F-BEST) crashed at Phou-Lassi Hill after an in-flight fire while on a Vientiane-Saigon service, killing all 34 on board; the wreckage was found on June 29.
June 29
A Western Air Lines DC-3A (registration N15569) crashed at Los Angeles International Airport due to a maintenance error, killing one of three on board.
July 6
Aeroflot Flight 878 (an Li-2, registration CCCP-L4027) disappeared with seven on board while on a Khorog-Stalinabad cargo service; the wreckage was found two days later 15 km (9.3 mi) northwest of Rushan; the aircraft had struck a mountain while flying too low.
July 10
USAF Douglas C-47D 43-48803 collided in mid-air with a Norwegian Air Force Republic F-84 Thunderjet near Sola Airport, killing all 11 on board both aircraft.
August 3
An Orient Airways C-47-DL (registration AP-AAD) crashed near Sharjah Airport due to crew error while on a Karachi-Sharjah-Bahrain-Jeddah service, killing one of 25 on board.
September 1
A Regina Cargo Airlines C-49K (registration N19941) crashed 12 mi southeast of Vail, Washington due to pilot error, killing all 21 on board.
September 8
A TACA de Honduras C-47A (registration XH-TAR) crashed near San Andres due to engine failure while on a San Pedro Sula-San Andres cargo service, killing all three on board.
September 25
A Devlet Turk Yollari C-47A (registration TC-EGE) crashed on climbout from Ankara Airport due to an engine fire, killing five of 21 on board.
October 21
Aeroflot Flight 525 (an Li-2, registration CCCP-L4890) crashed near Mineralnye Vody due to crew and ATC errors, killing the pilot; all three passengers and remaining four crew survived. The aircraft was operating a Sverdlovsk-Stalingrad-Mineralnye Vody passenger service.
October 31
An Aeroflot Li-2 (registration CCCP-L4732) crashed near Kharkiv due to crew error while on approach, killing 15 of 16 on board; the aircraft was operating a Roston-on-Don-Kharkiv-Moscow passenger service.
November 3
A Lloyd Aéreo Boliviano DC-3-314 (registration CP-600) crashed in the Rodeo Pampa mountains, killing all 28 on board.
December 12
An Indian Airlines C-47A (registration VT-CHF) crashed on climbout from Sonegaon Airport after a loss of altitude, killing 13 of 14 on board.

== See also ==
- List of accidents and incidents involving the DC-3 in the 1950s

== Notes ==
^Note A Military versions of the DC-3 were known as C-47 Skytrain, C-48, C-49, C-50, C-51, C-52, C-53 Skytrooper, C-68, C-84, C-117 Super Dakota and YC-129 by the United States Army Air Forces and as the R4D by the United States Navy. In Royal Air Force (and other British Commonwealth air forces') service, these aircraft were known as Dakotas.
