= List of accidents and incidents involving the DC-3 in 1945 =

This is a List of accidents and incidents involving Douglas DC-3 ^{A} variants that have taken place in the year 1945, including aircraft based on the DC-3 airframe such as the Douglas C-47 Skytrain and Lisunov Li-2. Military accidents are included; and hijackings and incidents of terrorism are covered, although acts of war are outside the scope of this list.

January 8
United States Army Air Forces Air Transport Command C-47 41-7797 crashed in India, three killed.

January 10
American Airlines Flight 6001 DC-3 NC25684 hit a hill during an instrument approach at Burbank, California, United States.

February 23
American Airlines Flight DC-3 NC18142 flew into a mountain near Marion, Virginia, United States.

April 14
Pennsylvania Central DC-3 N25692 flew into a mountain near Morgantown, West Virginia, United States.

April 19
US Navy R4D-5 transport aircraft (known as "Blue Goose", serial number 39067) crashed into a hillside shortly after takeoff in Perth, Western Australia, killing all 13 occupants.

June 4
Pan American Airlines DC-3A NC33611 stalled on take-off at Piarco Airport, Port of Spain, Trinidad.

August 5
United States Army Air Forces C-47 41-18505 crashed at Des, Iceland.

September 7
Eastern Airlines DC-3 NC33631 crashed at Florence, South Carolina, United States following a fire.

September 24
Royal New Zealand Air Force C-47B, registration NZ3526, took off from Espiritu Santo, New Hebrides, en route to RNZAF Base Whenuapai but crashed not long after takeoff. 16 passengers and 4 aircrew were killed and no trace of the aircraft was ever found despite an extensive search. web|url= https://asn.flightsafety.org/asndb/337654

December 12
United States Army Air Forces C-47 41-38700 crashed probably in Italy.

December 19
RAAF ambulance aircraft A65-83 crashed on or near an island in the Banda Sea during a storm.

December 30
Eastern Airlines DC-3 NC18123 overshot the runway on landing at La Guardia Airport, New York, United States and ended up in Flushing Bay.

== See also ==
- List of accidents and incidents involving the DC-3 in the 1940s

== Notes ==
^Note A Military versions of the DC-3 were known as C-47 Skytrain, C-48, C-49, C-50, C-51, C-52, C-53 Skytrooper, C-68, C-84, C-117 Super Dakota and YC-129 by the United States Army Air Forces and as the R4D by the United States Navy. In Royal Air Force (and other British Commonwealth air forces') service, these aircraft were known as Dakotas.
