= List of accidents and incidents involving the DC-3 in 1946 =

This is a List of accidents and incidents involving Douglas DC-3 ^{A} variants that have taken place in the year 1946, including aircraft based on the DC-3 airframe such as the Douglas C-47 Skytrain and Lisunov Li-2. Military accidents are included; and hijackings and incidents of terrorism are covered, although acts of war are outside the scope of this list.

January 6
Pennsylvania Central Airlines Flight 105 (a DC-3-393) crashed at Birmingham Airport due to pilot error, killing three of four crew; the flight attendant and all seven passengers survived.
January 14
An Aeroflot Li-2 (registration CCCP-L4150) broke up in mid-air and crashed near Netrubezh, Kolpnyansky District, Orel region due to icing, killing all 22 on board; 77 minutes into the flight, at 400–600 m (1,300–2,000 ft), a portion of the left stabilizer broke off and the aircraft entered a spin and broke up while recovering from the spin. The aircraft was operating a Kharkov-Moscow passenger service.
January 18
Eastern Air Lines Flight 105 (a DC-3-201E, registration NC19970) crashed at Cheshire, Connecticut due to wing separation caused by an engine fire, killing all 17 on board.
January 31
Royal Air Force (a C-47 Dakota crashed in a storm near Le Mans, killing 11 RAF servicemen.
January 31
United Airlines Flight 14 (a DC-3-194H, registration NC25675) struck Elk Mountain after the crew intentionally deviated from the flight course, killing all 21 on board.
January 31
An Aeroflot C-47 (registration CCCP-L854) was being ferried from Bykovo Airport to Vnukovo Airport when it crashed at what is now Solncevo, Moscow due to engine failure and loss of control, killing three of five crew.
February 20
An Aeroflot Li-2 (registration CCCP-L4162) crashed on takeoff from Minsk-1 Airport; takeoff was abandoned after the aircraft had lifted off, as a result the aircraft touched down outside the airport struck the ruins of a building and broke apart; all five crew on board survived, but the aircraft was written off. The aircraft was operating a Minsk-Moscow cargo service.
March 3
American Airlines Flight 6-103 (a DC-3-227B, registration NC21799) struck Thing Mountain after the pilot made a descent for reasons unknown, killing all 27 on board.
March 10
An Australian National Airways C-47-DL crashed in the sea shortly after takeoff from Hobart killing all 25 on board.
March 22
An Aeroflot Li-2 struck a mountainside 85 km (53 mi) from Anadyr while flying low between mountain ranges in the Kamchatka Region, Chukotka National District.
April 2
An Aeroflot C-47 (registration CCCP-L924) disappeared while on a Tbilisi-Rostov-on-Don passenger service; the wreckage was found on a mountain in the North Ossetia ASSR on July 20, 1947; all seven on board died. The pilot intentionally deviated from the planned course; the aircraft encountered icing conditions and lost altitude.
April 8
1946 United States Air Force DC-3 Crash at Yan'an was a US Army Air Force C-47B-1-DL (registration 43-16360) from Chongqing to Yan'an crashed in Shaanxi, China, killing all four crew members and 13 passengers, including four top Communist Chinese leaders: Ye Ting, Bo Gu, Deng Fa, and Wang Ruofei.
April 24
A Western Air Lines DC-3A-367 (registration NC33621) crashed at night near Hollywood, California while attempting to land after an engine failure during a test flight, killing all three crew.
May 16
A Viking Air Transport C-47A (registration NC53218) crashed near Byrd Field after the pilot shut down the wrong engine following a failure of the other engine, killing all 27 on board.
May 17
A C-47B-1 #43-48308 of the 1304th Air base Unit. Lost under unknown circumstances/unknown place while carrying 11 Crew/passengers and 38 sets of found remains of deceased US Servicemen; flight was from Rangoon to Calcutta India.
June 29
A C-47 Skytrain "Dakota" of the Royal Air Force Police crashed at Kallang Airport while attempting a take-off during a thunderstorm. All 20 NCOs (non-commissioned officers) along with the entire flight crew on board the aircraft were killed.
August 7
British European Airways Flight 530, a C-47A (registration G-AHCS), struck the mountain face of Mistberget while on approach to Oslo Airport, Gardermoen due to pilot error, killing three of sixteen on board.
August 14
A BOAC C-47A (registration G-AGHT) crashed on climbout at Luqa Airport after both engines failed due to fuel starvation caused by pilot error, killing one of five on board.
August 21
Trans-Luxury Airlines Flight 878 (a C-47-DL, registration NC51878) crashed at Moline, Illinois while attempting an emergency landing after an engine failure and fire, killing two of three crew; all 22 passengers survived.
September 3
An Air France C-53D Skytrooper (registration F-BAOB) crashed in a field 40 mi south of Copenhagen after an in-flight fire caused by a fuel leak, killing all 22 on board.
September 5
Trans-Luxury Airlines Flight 850 (a C-47A, registration NC57850) struck a hillside while on approach to Elko Airport, killing 20 of 21 on board.
September 17
A Sabena C-47-DL (registration OO-AUR) crashed on climbout from Haren Airport due to an unexplained loss of airspeed, killing one of three crew; all four passengers survived.
September 27
A Panair do Brasil DC-3A-228 (registration PP-PCH) struck a mountain near Rio Doce, killing all 25 on board. The aircraft was probably struck by lightning.
October 8
A Polyarnaya Aviatsiya Li-2 (registration CCCP-N394) was written off after being damaged in a flood at Amderma Airport.
October 17
National Air Transport Service Flight 942 (a C-47A, registration NC38942) crash at Laramie, Wyoming while the pilot was flying too low in bad weather, killing all 13 on board.
October 31
An Aeroflot Li-2 (registration CCCP-L4278) caught fire while on approach to Tashauz after a refueling error allowed some fuel to spill into the left wing; the fuel ignited after the engines were throttled down for landing. All 16 on board escaped before the aircraft burned out.

November 5
An Aeroflot Li-2 (registration CCCP-L4181) was being ferried from Voronezh to Moscow when it crashed near Yamshchina, Moskovskaya, Russia due to fuel exhaustion after being in a holding pattern for two hours, killing all five crew on board.
November 5
An Aeroflot C-47 (registration CCCP-L946) crashed in fog at Vnukovo Airport while attempting a go-around after being in a holding pattern for two hours, killing 13 of the 26 on board.
November 5
An Aeroflot Li-2 (registration CCCP-L4207) crashed at Vnukovo Airport after repeated landing attempts due to fuel exhaustion after being in a holding pattern for 75 minutes, killing one of 26 on board.
November 9
Aeroflot Flight 236, an Li-2 (registration CCCP-L4145), crashed at Ufa, Bashkir ASSR due to engine failure, killing six of seven on board.
November 11
United Airlines Flight 404 (a C-53D, registration NC19947) crashed at Cleveland, Ohio after the pilot established an approach to the wrong runway, killing two of three crew; all 17 passengers survived.
November 13
Western Air Lines Flight 23 (a C-53D, registration NC18645) struck White Mountain after the aircraft was blown off course due to a possible downdraft, killing all 11 on board.
November 14
A KLM DC-3 crashed at Schiphol Airport in bad weather after two landing attempts, killing all 26 on board.
November 19
The 1946 C-53 Skytrooper crash on the Gauli Glacier in Switzerland, unplanned "pancake" crash-landing on the so-named glacier by USAAF C-53 bearing serial number 42-68846, all twelve crew and passengers survived and safely rescued by two Flugwaffe-flown Fieseler Fi 156 Storch aircraft.
November 27
A LACSA C-47A (registration RX-76) struck Cedrel mountain while on approach to La Sabana Airport, killing all 23 on board.
December 4
An Aeroflot Li-2 crashed at Meshed (Mashhad), Iran, killing 24.
December 14
A Far East Air Transport C-47B (registration PI-C1) struck Mount Banahaur, killing 12 of 14 on board.
December 17
A Winged Cargo Inc. C-47A (registration NC88876) disappeared with seven on board while on a Kingston-San José service; the aircraft was found on November 29, 1947.
December 19
A Railway Air Services (C47-A, registration G-AGZA) bound for Glasgow crashed during take-off from Northolt (London).
December 24
Western Air Lines Flight 44 (a C-53D, registration NC45395) struck Cuyapaipe Mountain due to pilot error, killing all 12 on board.
December 28
A Kansas City Southern Skyways C-47A (registration NC58024) crashed at Walshville, Illinois after both engines failed, possibly due to fuel exhaustion, killing both pilots.
December 28
American Airlines Flight 2207 (a C-50A, registration NC15577) crashed at Michigan City, Indiana after both engines lost power due to carburetor icing caused by unexplained fuel starvation, killing two of three crew; all 18 passengers survived.
December 31
An Inter Continental Air Transport C-47A (registration NC88873) was being ferried from Newark to Charleston when it struck treetops and crashed on approach after flying too low, killing all five on board.

== See also ==
- List of accidents and incidents involving the DC-3 in the 1940s

== Notes ==
^Note A Military versions of the DC-3 were known as C-47 Skytrain, C-48, C-49, C-50, C-51, C-52, C-53 Skytrooper, C-68, C-84, C-117 Super Dakota and YC-129 by the United States Army Air Forces and as the R4D by the United States Navy. In Royal Air Force (and other British Commonwealth air forces') service, these aircraft were known as Dakotas.
