= List of accidents and incidents involving the DC-3 in 1951 =

This is a List of accidents and incidents involving Douglas DC-3^{A} variants that have taken place in the year 1951, including aircraft based on the DC-3 airframe such as the Douglas C-47 Skytrain and Lisunov Li-2. Military accidents are included; and hijackings and incidents of terrorism are covered, although acts of war are outside the scope of this list.

== January ==
January 9
An Aeroflot Li-2 (registration CCCP-L4359) crashed at Kazan after the right wing struck the top of a poorly illuminated radio tower while on approach to Kazan Airport en route from Lyubertsy, killing all six on board.
January 13
An Air Carriers VC-47D (registration VR-HEP) struck Bukit Besar mountain, Malaysia, killing all 10 on board.
January 18
A TAM Peru DC-3 disappeared over Peru with 15 on board.
January 31
A Flugfélag Islands C-47A (registration TF-ISG) crashed off Hafnarfjördur, Iceland while attempting to land at Reykjavik in heavy snow, killing all 20 on board.

== February ==
February 1
A Soviet Air Force Li-2 (serial number 4803) struck Mount Kekurnaya near Znamenskoye Airfield in Krasnoyarsk Krai, killing both pilots. Shortly after takeoff the crew made a right turn to avoid a hill, after which the crew proceeded to perform a 90 degree left turn, during which the aircraft crashed.

== March ==
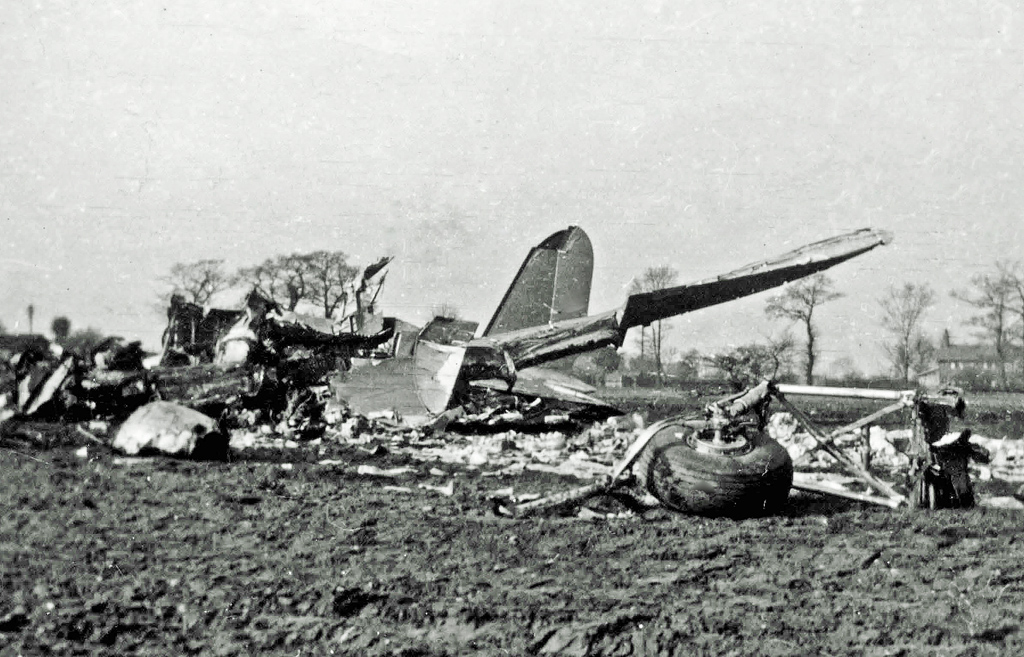
Wreckage of the Dakota that crashed at Ringway on 27 March

March 2
Mid-Continent Airlines Flight 16, a DC-3A (registration N19928), stalled and crashed while performing a left turn to land at Sioux City, Iowa en route from Omaha, killing 16 of 25 on board.
March 5
A USAF C-47B (serial number 43-48483) crashed at Kadena Air Base while attempting a go-around on one engine, killing one of three crew.
March 21
A LANSA R4D-1 (registration HK-315) crashed near Hato Nuevo, Colombia after the pilot changed course to avoid thunderstorms, killing all 29 on board.
March 22
A Cruzeiro do Sul C-53 (registration PP-CCX) crashed in the Baia Sul off Florianopolis Airport due to engine failure during a runway overshoot in poor visibility and rain, killing three of 14 on board.
March 25
An Aeroflot Li-2 (registration CCCP-L4790) stalled and crashed near Iskra, Russia, killing 12 of 13 on board. Shortly after takeoff the aircraft encountered poor visibility and bad weather. The right propeller was accidentally feathered, causing a loss of altitude. Altitude was lost until the aircraft struck trees, after which control was lost and the aircraft stalled and crashed upside down on a hill slope. The investigation found that the pilot was drunk and the co-pilot was licensed to fly the Po-2, not the Li-2. The sole survivor was rescued ten days later.
March 27
An Air Transport Charter C-47A Dakota III crashed shortly after takeoff from Ringway Airport due to engine failure caused by carburetor icing, killing both pilots; a third crew member survived.

== April ==
April 6
Southwest Airways Flight 7, a C-47A (registration N63439) struck a ridge at 2740 feet at Refugio Pass, California, in the Santa Ynez Mountains, killing all 22 on board; the aircraft was flying too low for reasons unknown.
April 8
A USAF C-47B (serial number 43-48298) crashed into a hillside near Charleston, West Virginia while on an ADF approach to Kanawha County Airport, killing all 21 on board.
April 8
An Aeroflot Li-2 (registration CCCP-L4467) crashed at Mama, Russia, killing all eight on board.
April 9
A Siamese Airways DC-3 (registration HS-SAE) crashed near Cape d'Arguilar, Hong Kong while approaching Kai Tak Airport, killing all 16 on board; the pilot allowed the aircraft to lose too much speed while avoiding high ground during the approach.
April 21
A Colombian Air Force C-47 (serial number FAC-671) crashed at Tres Esquinas Air Base, killing all three crew.
April 28
United Airlines Flight 129, a DC-3A-397 (registration N16088) crashed near Fort Wayne, Indiana after flying into a downdraft, killing all 11 on board.

== May ==
May 9
A US Navy R4D-5 (serial number 17114) crashed shortly after takeoff from NAS Patuxent River following an engine fire, killing both pilots; all five passengers survived.
May 11
A USAF VC-47D (serial number 43-49266) struck Mount Spokane, Washington, killing both pilots.
May 18
A VASP C-47B (registration PP-SPL) crashed into high ground near Rancharia, Brazil due to the pilot flying VFR in bad weather, killing all seven on board.
May 27
A Royal Hellenic Air Force C-47D crashed into a mountain near Daegu Air Base after takeoff, killing all five on board.

== June ==
June 6
A L.A. Transcontinental Brasileira DC-3D (registration PP-NAL) struck high ground at 180 feet at Gramacho, Rio de Janeiro, Brazil, killing two of 19 on board; the crew was flying VFR in bad weather and had descended too low.
June 13
A SAM C-47A (registration HK-504) struck a factory chimney and crashed at Medellin, Colombia while attempting an emergency return to Enrique Olaya Herrera Airport, killing both pilots and one person on the ground.

== July ==
July 1
A USAF C-47A (serial number 43-15144) crashed in fog while on approach to McGuire AFB, killing five of 26 on board.
July 12
A Lóide Aéreo Nacional C-47B (registration PP-LPG) crashed near Aracaju Airport while performing a right turn following a runway overshoot, killing all 33 on board. The aircraft was leased from Linhas Aéreas Paulistas.
July 24
A Sabena DC-3-445 (registration OO-CBA) crashed shortly after takeoff from Gao Airport due to engine failure, killing all three crew.

== August ==
August 7
A Brazilian Air Force C-47A (serial number 2028) struck a hillside at Guaratiba, Brazil due to possible engine failure, killing all four crew.
August 8
A Trans Australia Airlines C-47A (registration VH-TAT) crashed in Barilla Bay just after takeoff due to a loss of control caused by icing, killing both pilots.
August 11
An Air France DC-3D (registration F-BAXB) crashed at Moisville, France after the tail separated during a test flight as a result of an abnormal maneuver made when the crew attempted normal flight on both engines, killing all five crew.
August 12
An Aeroflot Li-2 (registration CCCP-L4314) crashed at Vilyuisk following double engine failure, killing two of 16 on board.

== September ==
September 8
A VASP C-47B (registration PP-SPQ) struck a house and crashed just after takeoff from São Paulo, killing all 10 on board and three on the ground.
September 12
A STAAP DC-3 (registration F-BEIZ) crashed in the Mediterranean Sea due to a in-flight breakup caused by a loss of control in bad weather, killing all 39 on board.
September 15
An Air-India C-47A (registration VT-CCA) lost control and crashed shortly after takeoff from Hindustan Airport while attempting to take off with the autopilot engaged, killing one of 27 on board.
September 17
A Real Transportes Aéreos C-47 (registration PP-YPX) disappeared with 10 on board while on a Rio de Janeiro-São Paulo passenger service; wreckage was found two days later at Ubatuba; there were no survivors.

== October ==
October 1
An Aeroflot Li-2 (registration CCCP-L4775) crashed near Serkova, Krasnoyarsk Oblast, killing six of 15 on board.
October 11
An Aeroflot Li-2 (registration CCCP-L4416) crashed at Bogdanovich, Sverdlovsk Oblast, killing one of 10 on board.
October 17
The pilots of JAT DC-3 fly off course to land in Switzerland, seeking political asylum for themselves and their family, who were on board.

== November ==
November 15
A LOT Polish Airlines Li-2 (registration SP-LKA) crashed near Tuszyn shortly after takeoff from Lodz due to engine failure and loss of control (although the official cause was bad weather and pilot error), killing all 18 on board.
November
A LOT Polish Airlines Li-2 (registration SP-LBE) was reportedly written off; it was cancelled from the Polish register on November 29, 1951.

== December ==
December 4
United Airlines Flight 16, a DC-3A (registration N17109), stalled, entered a spin, and crashed at Stapleton International Airport during a training flight, killing all three crew.
December 27
An Aeroflot Li-2 (registration CCCP-L4228) crashed near Namtsev, Russia while attempting a forced landing following double engine failure due to fuel exhaustion, killing all 20 on board.
December 30
USAF VC-47D transporting US Military Academy cadets back to West Point after Christmas, departed Hamilton Field (San Rafael CA), crashed en route in poor weather in mountainous terrain about 35 miles north of Globe AZ, killing all 28 on board.

== See also ==
- List of accidents and incidents involving the DC-3

== Notes ==
^Note A Military versions of the DC-3 were known as C-47 Skytrain, C-48, C-49, C-50, C-51, C-52, C-53 Skytrooper, C-68, C-84, C-117 Super Dakota and YC-129 by the United States Army Air Forces and as the R4D by the United States Navy. In Royal Air Force (and other British Commonwealth air forces') service, these aircraft were known as Dakotas.
