= List of accidents and incidents involving the DC-3 in 1941 =

This is a list of accidents and incidents involving Douglas DC-3 variants that have taken place in the year 1941, including aircraft based on the DC-3 airframe such as the Douglas C-47 Skytrain and Lisunov PS-84. Hijackings and incidents of terrorism are included, as are military accidents, although acts of war are outside the scope of this list.

January 12
A United Airlines Douglas DC-3A-197 (registration NC16072) was destroyed in a hangar fire at Salt Lake City Municipal Airport along with a Western Air Express Boeing 247 (NC13339).
January 23
TWA Flight 6 (a Douglas DC-3B-202, registration NC17315) struck trees and crashed near St. Louis while attempting to land in bad weather, killing two of 15 on board.
February 26
Eastern Air Lines Flight 21 (a Douglas DST-318A, registration NC28394) crashed while descending to land at Atlanta, Georgia due to altimeter misread, killing eight of 16 on board, including Congressman William D. Byron; Eastern Air Lines president Eddie Rickenbacker survived the crash.
April 3
An Eastern Air Lines Douglas DC-3-201B (NC21727) crashed on water near Vero Beach, Florida during a storm; all 16 on board survived, but the aircraft was written off.
April 25
An Aeroflot Douglas DC-3-196A (registration URSS-C) crashed on takeoff from Moscow in a snowstorm; all three on board survived, but the aircraft was written off.
June 10
A United Douglas DC-3-A (registration NC16064), designated by United as "Trip 2", piloted by Captain Elrey Jeppesen and First Officer F. W. Allan, overran the runway at Denver Municipal Airport and caused major damage to the aircraft. All 15 passenger and 3 crew members were unhurt.
June 19
A LARES Douglas DC-3-227 (registration YR-PAF) crashed on takeoff from Bucharest, Romania; all 18 on board survived; despite the aircraft being written off, it was rebuilt in 1953 using Soviet parts.
July 26
A Soviet Air Force Douglas DC-3 crashed into Lake Sig, Tver region while evading an attack by two German fighters; killing seven of 17 on board; the wreckage was located in 2000. The aircraft had departed Yedrovo Airport for Andreapol Air Base.
August 6
A Soviet Air Force Li-2 (CCCP-L3411) was shot down by a Luftwaffe Bf 109, killing two. The aircraft was operating a medevac flight.
October 3
An Aeroflot Lisunov PS-84 (CCCP-L3926) crashed on takeoff from Vyazma-Dvoyevka due to overloading, killing one. The wreckage was destroyed to prevent it from falling into German hands.
October 29
A Soviet Air Force Li-2 crashed near Golodyayeva (now Dubrovka) after circling over the Byeloye ozero forest due to poor visibility, killing all 24 on board. The aircraft was operating a Moscow–Kuibyshev flight on behalf of the evacuation of GAZ No. 1 to Kuibyshev.
October 30
Northwest Airlines Trip 5 (a Douglas DC-3A-269, registration NC21712) crashed at Moorhead, Minnesota in fog due to icing; of the 15 on board, only pilot Clarence Bates survived.
October 30
American Airlines Flight 1 (a Douglas DC-3-277B, registration NC25663) stalled and crashed at St. Thomas, Ontario, Canada while attempting to find a place to land, killing all 20 on board; the cause of the crash was not determined.
November 14
An Aeroflot PS-84 (CCCP-L3488) crashed near Akchernya, Russia while attempting a forced landing after the crew were unable to locate their destination after drifting off course, killing all 14 on board.
November 29
An Aeroflot PS-84 (CCCP-L3989) crashed on takeoff from Saratov Airport during a test flight, killing one of five on board. The tail and ailerons were damaged in a storm three weeks earlier while the aircraft was parked. During later repairs, the aileron control cables were connected backwards by mistake.

== See also ==
- List of accidents and incidents involving the DC-3
