= List of accidents and incidents involving the DC-3 in 1966 =

This is a list of accidents and incidents involving the Douglas DC-3^{A} that occurred in 1966, including aircraft based on the DC-3 airframe such as the Douglas C-47 Skytrain and Lisunov Li-2. Military accidents are included; and hijackings and incidents of terrorism are covered, although acts of war involving military aircraft are outside the scope of this list.

== January ==
- January 1: Two Garuda Douglas C-47's collided in mid-air near Palembang, killing all 34 on board both aircraft.
- January 13: USAF Douglas C-47A 42-93090 struck the side of Mount Helmos, Greece, killing six of ten on board; the wreckage was found two days later.

== February ==
- February 2: US Navy Douglas LC-47 50832 stalled and crashed on landing at Byrd Station, Antarctica and caught fire, killing all six on board.

== April ==
- April 1: A private Douglas TC-47K (registration N91375) burned out after landing at Litchfield Park Naval Air Station, Arizona, due to an engine fire of undetermined causes; both pilots survived.
- April 17: A Continental Air Services, Inc Douglas C-47A (registration N8744R) crashed at Sam Neua, Laos while on a supply drop mission in Laos, killing both pilots.

== May ==
- May 11: A Polynesian Airlines Douglas R4D-5 (registration 5W-FAB) crashed at Apolima Strait, Samoa after a door separated and struck the tail and caused a loss of control while on a training flight, killing all three on board.

== June ==
- June 3: USAF Douglas AC-47D Spooky 43-48925 crashed in flames near Ban Phakat, Laos while on a mission over Khommouane Province, killing all six on board.
- June 27: An Aeronaut Air Services Douglas DC-3 (registration N17337) stalled and crashed at Long Beach, Mississippi after an engine failure caused by improper maintenance, killing two of 12 on board.
- June 29: Philippine Airlines Flight 785 (a Douglas C-47A, registration PI-C17) crashed in a ravine near Sablayan, Philippines due to weather and pilot error, killing 26 of 28 on board.

== July ==
- July 15: A REAL Transportes Aereos Douglas C-47A (registration PP-YPT) crash-landed in a field at Campo Largo, Brazil; all 20 on board survived, but the aircraft was written off.
- July 25: USMC Douglas C-117D Super DC-3 17211 stalled and crashed on takeoff from Da Nang, Vietnam, killing seven of 31 on board.
- July 25: A Thai Government Douglas DC-3-362 (registration HS-OOO) disappeared over the Pacific Ocean on a delivery flight 840 km off San Francisco with three on board. The crew radioed to a passing airliner that an engine had failed and that they were returning to San Francisco.
- July 27: Frontier Airlines Flight 188 (a Douglas C-47A, registration N4994E) ran off the runway on takeoff from Gallup Airport, New Mexico due to pilot error; all 16 on board survived, but the aircraft was written off.

== August ==
- August 11: A Tarom Lisunov Li-2 (registration YR-TAN) crashed in the Lotriora Valley, Romania, killing all 24 on board.
- August 17: A Gulf Aviation Douglas C-47 (registration G-AOFZ) crashed on takeoff from Muscat, Oman due to loss of power caused by pilot error; all 20 on board survive, but the aircraft was written off.
- August 17: A Lauderdale Leasing Douglas DC-3 (registration N28343) crashed near Mérida, Mexico while on a smuggling flight; both pilots survived, but the aircraft was written off.
- August 27: Brazilian Air Force C-47A 2037 crashed at Altamira, Pará, killing six.
- August 29: Turkish Air Force C-47B 43-6014 crashed at Tuzla, Istanbul due to a bird strike, killing five of nine on board.

== September ==
- September 16: Iberia Flight 261, a Douglas C-47A (EC-AXC) leased from Spantax, ditched off Puertito de El Sauzal, Spain after the number one engine oversped; one passenger died (of 27 on board) after refusing to leave the aircraft when it sank. The cause of the engine problem was not determined as the wreckage was not recovered.

== November ==
- November 11: USAF Douglas C-47D 43-48961 crashed in Vietnam due to engine failure; all four on board survived, but the aircraft was written off; the aircraft was used for propaganda missions.
- November 22: An Aden Airways R4D-1 (VR-AAN) exploded in mid-air and crashed at Wadi Rabtah, Yemen after a bomb placed in the passenger cabin detonated, killing all 30 on board.
- November 26: USAF Douglas C-47D 44-76544 crashed near Tan Son Nhut Airport while attempting to return after the pilot reported an engine problem, killing all 26 on board.
- November 26: A DC-3 crashed on takeoff from Gulfport, Mississippi, killing both pilots.

== December ==
- December 24: Avianca Flight 729, a Douglas C-47A (registration HK-161) disappeared while on a Bogota-Cali-Pasto service with 29 on board; the wreckage was found on January 4, 1967 on a mountainside 60 km (37 mi) from Pasto.

== See also ==
- List of accidents and incidents involving the DC-3 in the 1960s

== Notes ==
^Note A Military versions of the DC-3 were known as C-47 Skytrain, C-48, C-49, C-50, C-51, C-52, C-53 Skytrooper, C-68, C-84, C-117 Super Dakota and YC-129 by the United States Army Air Forces and as the R4D by the United States Navy. In Royal Air Force (and other British Commonwealth air forces') service, these aircraft were known as Dakotas.
