= List of accidents and incidents involving the DC-3 in 1950 =

This is a List of accidents and incidents involving Douglas DC-3 ^{A} variants that have taken place in the year 1950, including aircraft based on the DC-3 airframe such as the Douglas C-47 Skytrain and Lisunov Li-2. Military accidents are included; and hijackings and incidents of terrorism are covered, although acts of war are outside the scope of this list.

January 5
Soviet Air Force Li-2 42 red crashed at Koltsovo Airport in Sverdlovsk (now Yekaterinburg) after repeated approach attempts in heavy snow, killing all 19 on board, including 11 Soviet Air Force hockey players; some reports put the accident date as January 7.
January 21
A Transporte Aéreo Militar C-47 (registration TAM-10) crashed in the Andes Mountains near Vacas, Bolivia after flying into a thunderstorm, killing all 32 on board.
January 24
A Philippine Airlines DC-3 (registration PI-C22) disappeared while on an Ilolio-Manila cargo service with four on board.
January 24
An STA C-47A (registration F-BFGD) struck a mountain en route to Tamatave from Antananarivo, killing all 14 on board.
February 2
A KLM C-47A (registration PH-TEU) crashed 40 miles off the Dutch coast due to an engine fire, killing all seven on board.
February 27
A CSA C-47A (registration OK-WDY) struck Praded Mountain en route to Prague from Ostrava, killing six of 25 on board.
March 24
Three Czechoslovak Airlines Douglas DC-3s from Czechoslovakia were simultaneously hijacked, mostly by the crew themselves. All three planes landed at the US Air Force Base at Erding, West Germany seeking political asylum. 26 of 85 passengers stayed in West Germany to escape from the Communist regime in Czechoslovakia.
March 25
A Devlet Hava Yollari C-47A (registration TC-BAL) crashed and caught fire on landing at Etimesgut Airport, killing all 15 on board.
March 28
US Air Force C-47D 45-1065 crashed near Rockcliffe RCAF Station in Ontario, Canada, killing four of the five occupants, including the US ambassador to Canada Laurence Steinhardt.
March 29
A LOT Polish Airlines Li-2T (registration SP-LBA) crashed in Poland.
April 5
A Deccan Airways C-47A (registration VT-CJD) crashed at Hatiara, India while attempting to return to Dum Dum Airport after an engine failed, killing all three crew; the aircraft was also overloaded.
April 17
Aeroflot Flight 543 (a TS-62, registration CCCP-Л862) crashed 29 km (18 mi) southwest of Vitim, Russia after an unexplained engine fire, killing 10 of 16 on board. The aircraft was operating an Irkutsk-Olekminsk-Kirensk-Yakutsk passenger service.
May 2
An Avianca C-47-DL (registration HK-120) crashed in the Mattassl Mountains, killing all 15 on board.
May 24
A LANSA C-47A (registration HK-307) struck Galeras Volcano, killing 25 of 26 on board.
May 30
An Aerovias Brasil C-47-DL (registration PP-AVZ) crashed near Ilheus after it broke apart in mid-air due to a high-speed dive caused by a loss of control, killing 13 of 15 on board.
June 9
A New Tribes Mission DC-3-178 (registration N16030) disappeared while on a Kingston-Maracaibo service with 15 on board; the wreckage was found on July 6, 1950 on a mountain 42 miles from the flight path; the cause was never determined.
July 9
An Aigle Azur C-47A (registration F-BFGL) crashed on climbout from Casablanca, killing 22 of 29 on board.
July 17
An Indian National Airways C-47A (registration VT-ATS) crashed near Pathankot, India after a wing separated in severe turbulence, killing all 22 on board.
August 13
A Dalstroi Aviation Li-2 (registration CCCP-X955) crashed after the right wing struck a mountain slope 45 mi NW of Seymchan while the crew attempted a forced landing due to fuel exhaustion after the crew became disoriented in poor visibility, killing the five crew. The aircraft was operating a Pevek-Zyryanka cargo service.
August 25
Royal Air Force DC-3 KN630 crashed occurred following an engine failure while target marking and supply dropping mission over the Malaysian jungle, killing all 12 on board.
September 4
Robinson Airlines Flight 32 (a DC-3-229, registration N18936) crashed near Utica, New York due to engine failure and loss of power, killing 16 of 23 on board.
September 14
An Iran Air C-47A (registration EP-AAG) crashed on takeoff from Mehrabad Airport, killing all eight on board.
September 21
A JAT Yugoslav Airlines C-47A (registration YU-ABC) struck Mount Medvednica (19 km northeast of Lucko Airport) at 975 m (3,199 ft) while on approach to Zagreb en route from Beograd (now Belgrade), killing 10 of 11 on board.
October 12
A John Fairfax & Sons Douglas C-47 Skytrain (DC-3) (registration VH-SMH) on a newspaper delivery run, crashed into trees in low cloud at Bungulla, 8 kilometres (5.0 mi) from Tenterfield, New South Wales, killing the pilot and co-pilot.
October 17
A BEA Dakota C.3 (registration G-AGIW) crashed at Mill Hill due to engine failure and loss of altitude, killing 28 of 29 on board.
November 7
A Polyarnaya Aviatsiya Li-2 (registration CCCP-Н359) crashed while attempting to takeoff from Arctic Ice Station SP-2; the aircraft was written off, but the casualty count was unknown.
November 9
An Aeroflot/Krasnoyarsk TS-62 (registration CCCP-Л1098, former 45-971) crashed in the Krasnoyarsk region, Russia due to wing icing, killing two of 12 on board.
November 15
A TARS Li-2P (registration YR-TAA) crashed in the Fagaras Mountains.
November 17
A Garuda Indonesia Airways C-47A (registration PK-PDB) ran off the runway after landing at Juanda Airport, killing two of three crew; all 20 passengers survived.
November 23
A Faucett C-47B (registration OB-PAU-201) struck a hillside in poor weather at Cuzco, Peru en route to Quincemil Airport, killing all nine on board.
November 25
An Indamer Dakota III (registration VT-COI) struck a hillside near Khitoka, Bhutan due to crew distraction, killing all three crew.
December 1
An Iran Air C-47A (registration EP-AAJ) struck a mountain near Chamaran en route to Tehran from Tabriz, killing all eight on board.
December 8
An Air Atlas C-47B (registration F-BAXY) crashed in the Pyrenees Mountains, killing five of seven on board.
December 13
An Air India C-47B (registration VT-CFK) struck a mountain near Kotagiri, India due to a navigation error, killing all 21 on board.
December 15
An AVENSA C-47-DL (registration YV-C-AVU) crashed into mountains shortly after takeoff due to pilot error, killing all 31 on board.
December 22
Canadian Pacific Air Lines Flight 4 (a C-47A, registration CF-CUF) struck Okanagan Mountain while the pilot was flying too low; killing both pilots; the flight attendant and all 15 passengers survived.
December 27
An Aeroflot/Uzbekistan Li-2 (registration CCCP-Л4003) struck a mountain at Mynzhilki after being blown off course by strong winds, killing the eight crew. The aircraft was operating an aerial survey flight.

== See also ==
- List of accidents and incidents involving the DC-3

== Notes ==
^Note A Military versions of the DC-3 were known as C-47 Skytrain, C-48, C-49, C-50, C-51, C-52, C-53 Skytrooper, C-68, C-84, C-117 Super Dakota and YC-129 by the United States Army Air Forces and as the R4D by the United States Navy. In Royal Air Force (and other British Commonwealth air forces') service, these aircraft were known as Dakotas.
