= List of accidents and incidents involving the DC-3 in 1967 =

This is a list of accidents and incidents involving the Douglas DC-3^{A} that occurred in 1967, including aircraft based on the DC-3 airframe such as the Douglas C-47 Skytrain and Lisunov Li-2. Military accidents are included; and hijackings and incidents of terrorism are covered, although acts of war involving military aircraft are outside the scope of this list.

February 18
USAF RC-47P 43-49679 was written off after being struck by a crashing China Airlines Curtiss C-46 at Tan Son Nhat International Airport.
March 10
US Navy VC-47J 99844 crashed near Phan Rang while operating an administrative flight from Cam Ranh to Saigon, killing all 25 on board.
April 8
A Hunting Surveys C-47B (registration G-AMYW) crashed near Hail, Saudi Arabia due to engine failure and pilot error; all four on board survived, but the aircraft was written off.
April 26
USAF AC-47D Spooky 43-48921 crashed into Cam Ranh Bay due to a in-flight flare explosion; killing all seven on board.
April 27
An Avianca C-47-DL (registration HK-326) crashed shortly after takeoff from Alberto Lleras C. Airport, killing 17 of 18 on board (only a passenger survived).
May 3
A Flugsyn C-47B (registration TF-AIO) struck a hillside at Vestmannaeyjar en route from Reykjavik, killing all three on board.
June 12
An Aeronaves de México DC-3A-197D (registration XA-FUW) crashed on climbout from Manuel Márquez de León International Airport due to engine failure, killing three on the DC-3 and two on the ground.
June 16
A Brazilian Air Force C-47B (registration FAB 2068) crashed on the Amazon Rainforest, killing 20 of 25 on board.
July 25
A Vehu Akat DC-3 (registration XW-PDL) crashed in mountainous terrain near Luang Prabang while in a holding pattern, killing all 16 on board. The aircraft was leased from Taiwan Airways (registration B-112).
December 7
A Lao Cathay Airlines DC-3 (registration XW-PFM) crashed near Muang Soui, Laos while on a supply drop mission, killing 10 of 12 on board.
December 21
Frontier Airlines Flight 2610 (a DC-3C, registration N65276) crashed on takeoff from Stapleton International Airport due to loss of control caused by improper ground maintenance, killing both pilots. The aircraft was due to operate a cargo service.
December 21
A private DC-3-270B (registration N28360) was destroyed by a tornado while parked at McBride, Mississippi, along with an airport tower and two hangars.
December 25
Thai Airways Flight 002 (a C-47A, registration HS-TDH) crashed while on approach to Chiang Mai International Airport after the pilot followed the wrong route to land, killing four of 31 on board.

== See also ==
- List of accidents and incidents involving the DC-3 in the 1960s

== Notes ==
^Note A Military versions of the DC-3 were known as C-47 Skytrain, C-48, C-49, C-50, C-51, C-52, C-53 Skytrooper, C-68, C-84, C-117 Super Dakota and YC-129 by the United States Army Air Forces and as the R4D by the United States Navy. In Royal Air Force (and other British Commonwealth air forces') service, these aircraft were known as Dakotas.
