= List of accidents and incidents involving the DC-3 =

This is a list of pages listing accidents and incidents involving the Douglas DC-3, (Note: Military versions of the DC-3 were known as C-47 Skytrain, C-48, C-49, C-50, C-51, C-52, C-53 Skytrooper, C-68, C-84, C-117 Super Dakota and YC-129 by the United States Army Air Forces and its successor the United States Air Force; and as the R4D by the United States Navy. In Royal Air Force (and other British Commonwealth air forces') service, these aircraft were known as Dakotas.) including aircraft based on the DC-3 airframe such as the Douglas C-47 Skytrain and Lisunov Li-2. Hijackings and incidents of terrorism are included, as are military accidents, although acts of war are outside the scope of this list.

== 1930s ==
- List of accidents and incidents involving the DC-3 in the 1930s

== 1940s ==
1940
List of accidents and incidents involving the DC-3 in 1940
1941
List of accidents and incidents involving the DC-3 in 1941
1942
List of accidents and incidents involving the DC-3 in 1942
1943
List of accidents and incidents involving the DC-3 in 1943
1944
List of accidents and incidents involving the DC-3 in 1944
1945
List of accidents and incidents involving the DC-3 in 1945
1946
List of accidents and incidents involving the DC-3 in 1946
1947
List of accidents and incidents involving the DC-3 in 1947
1948
List of accidents and incidents involving the DC-3 in 1948
1949
List of accidents and incidents involving the DC-3 in 1949

== 1950s ==
1950
List of accidents and incidents involving the DC-3 in 1950
1951
List of accidents and incidents involving the DC-3 in 1951
1952
List of accidents and incidents involving the DC-3 in 1952
1953
List of accidents and incidents involving the DC-3 in 1953
1954
List of accidents and incidents involving the DC-3 in 1954
1955
List of accidents and incidents involving the DC-3 in 1955
1956
List of accidents and incidents involving the DC-3 in 1956
1957
List of accidents and incidents involving the DC-3 in 1957
1957 Cebu Douglas C-47 crash which caused the death of the 7th President of the Philippines, Ramon Magsaysay
1958
List of accidents and incidents involving the DC-3 in 1958
1959
List of accidents and incidents involving the DC-3 in 1959

== 1960s ==
1960
List of accidents and incidents involving the DC-3 in 1960
1961
List of accidents and incidents involving the DC-3 in 1961
1962
List of accidents and incidents involving the DC-3 in 1962
1963
List of accidents and incidents involving the DC-3 in 1963
1964
List of accidents and incidents involving the DC-3 in 1964
1965
List of accidents and incidents involving the DC-3 in 1965
1966
List of accidents and incidents involving the DC-3 in 1966
1967
List of accidents and incidents involving the DC-3 in 1967
1968
List of accidents and incidents involving the DC-3 in 1968
1969
List of accidents and incidents involving the DC-3 in 1969

== 1970s ==
- List of accidents and incidents involving the DC-3 (1970–1974)
- List of accidents and incidents involving the DC-3 (1975–1979)

== 1980s ==
- List of accidents and incidents involving the DC-3 in the 1980s

== 1990s ==
- List of accidents and incidents involving the DC-3 in the 1990s

== Since 2000 ==
- List of accidents and incidents involving the DC-3 since 2000
