= Jamair =

JamAir
- Founded: 1946; 80 years ago
- Ceased operations: 1977; 49 years ago
- Headquarters: Calcutta, India

Jamair was a privately owned airline based in Calcutta, India. It provided both scheduled and non-scheduled charter services.

== History ==
Jamair was formed in 1946 by James B. Muff, a former chief engineer at China National Aviation Corporation (CNAC) and Eddie Quinn, a radio operator and pilot with CNAC. They were financially backed by the Maharajah Jam Sahib of Nawanagar and were based out of Jamnagar where the maharaja developed an air base for the aircraft. In 1949 and 1950 they bought out the Maharajah's interests in the business and moved to Dum Dum Airport in Calcutta, West Bengal, with a fleet of five C-47/DC-3s, loads of spares and a small engineering team. C. L. Chandak and his brother P. C. Chandak, an experienced business family were taken in to the board as directors and Jamair began operating air supply missions to nearby states in north-east India, but as commercial trade improved rapidly after WWII, the airline began receiving charter orders from export houses and so began international cargo services as far away as South America and Europe. After nationalisation of internal routes in August 1953, Jamair reverted to being a private charter company. Business picked up soon and charters to major Indian cities like Bombay, Bangalore and Delhi were added to their schedule. In early 1960s, the airline also operated from Delhi Safdarjung Airport to Jodhpur, Bikaner and Sriganganagar in Rajasthan. In 1951, Herbert Dequadros aka Bob Dequadros from Burma Air joined the team as head engineer and general manager and with his expertise the airline grew in business and expanded in 1974 with additional 3 DC 4s purchased from Indian Airlines. These large bodied aircraft were commissioned to fly on commercial routes carrying passengers from Calcutta to Bombay via Panagarh in West Bengal. Out of the three aircraft, one was de-commissioned for scrap and spares were used to keep the other two flying. However, these planes proved too costly for the airline and in 1975, they were re-sold to private operator Air Works India in Bombay. The DC-3s remained in the fleet with two of five meeting with accidents, some severely with loss of lives. In 1976, the first batch of Boeing 737s came into operations by Indian Airlines and the DGCA authorised the aircraft to service similar Jamair routes, thus leading to losses for the old airline. Around 1966, the company invited a business partner so as to financially sustain the airline, but this proved troublesome for the original owners over the years and the company became embroiled in legal battles right to the last day of operations. In 1971, Bob Dequadros became the third partner with 40% stake in the airline. Founder partner James B. Muff remained in New Delhi for the latter part of his life overseeing operations from the northern part of India. He eventually became ill and died in Calcutta in 1977. Rising fuel costs, labour problems, local competition, a shrinking fleet and legal battles between partners eventually broke the company apart and in late 1977 operations ceased. The demise of James B. Muff left partner Bob Dequadros to conclude the numerous legal battles till his death in 1981. The remaining DC-3s were scrapped in 1978 and money from the scrap dealers went to pay off staff and legal fees.

== Incidents and accidents ==
- 15 May 1954 - A Douglas C-47B (registration VT-DGO) operated by Jamair touched down at Saugaon after a high approach. An overshoot was imminent, but the pilot realised that the aircraft could not be pulled up before the end of the runway. He retracted the undercarriage, causing the plane to slid off the runway, coming to rest at the edge of a deep drain.
- 7 December 1961 - A Douglas C-47A (registration VT-AZV) operated by Jamair crashed on takeoff from Amritsar, India due to fuel starvation and pilot error; both pilots survived, but the aircraft was written off.
- On 5 December 1970, - Douglas C-47A VT-CZC crashed shortly after take-off from Safdarjung Airport, New Delhi following an engine failure. The aircraft was operating a non-scheduled passenger flight. Five of the sixteen people on board were killed.
- On 26 March 1971 - Douglas C-47A VT-ATT crashed into a hill near Hashimara whilst on a flight from Guwahati Airport to Bagdogra Airport. All 15 people on board were killed.

== Fleet ==
The fleet consisted of five Douglas DC-3 and three DC-4 aircraft in 1977.
