= List of airports by IATA code: P =

| IATA | ICAO | Airport name | Location served | Time | DST |
-PA-
| PAA | VYPA | Hpa-An Airport | Hpa-An, Myanmar | | |
| PAB | VEBU | Bilaspur Airport | Bilaspur, Chhattisgarh, India | | |
| PAC | MPMG | Albrook "Marcos A. Gelabert" International Airport | Panama City, Panama | | |
| PAD | EDLP | Paderborn Lippstadt Airport | Paderborn / Lippstadt, North Rhine-Westphalia, Germany | | |
| PAE | KPAE | Paine Field (Snohomish County Airport) | Everett, Washington, United States | | |
| PAF | HUPA | Pakuba Airfield | Pakuba, Uganda | | |
| PAG | RPMP | Pagadian Airport | Pagadian, Philippines | | |
| PAH | KPAH | Barkley Regional Airport | Paducah, Kentucky, United States | | |
| PAJ | OPPC | Parachinar Airport | Parachinar, Pakistan | | |
| PAK | PHPA | Port Allen Airport | Hanapepe, Hawaii, United States | | |
| PAL | SKPQ | Captain Germán Olano Moreno Air Base | Palanquero, Colombia | | |
| PAM | KPAM | Tyndall Air Force Base | Panama City, Florida, United States | | |
| PAN | VTSK | Pattani Airport | Pattani, Thailand | | |
| PAO | KPAO | Palo Alto Airport (Santa Clara County Airport) | Palo Alto, California, United States | | |
| PAP | MTPP | Toussaint L'Ouverture International Airport | Port-au-Prince, Haiti | | |
| PAQ | PAAQ | Palmer Municipal Airport | Palmer, Alaska, United States | | |
| PAR | | metropolitan area^{1} | Paris, Île-de-France, France | | |
| PAS | LGPA | Paros National Airport | Paros, Greece | | |
| PAT | VEPT | Lok Nayak Jayaprakash Airport | Patna, Bihar, India | | |
| PAU | VYPK | Pauk Airport | Pauk, Myanmar | | |
| PAV | SBUF | Paulo Afonso Airport | Paulo Afonso, Bahia, Brazil | | |
| PAW | | Pambwa Airport | Pambwa, Papua New Guinea | | |
| PAX | MTPX | Port-de-Paix Airport | Port-de-Paix, Haiti | | |
| PAY | WBKP | Pamol Airport | Pamol, Sabah, Malaysia | | |
| PAZ | MMPA | El Tajín National Airport | Poza Rica, Veracruz, Mexico | | |
-PB-
| PBB | SSPN | Paranaíba Airport | Paranaíba, Mato Grosso do Sul, Brazil | | |
| PBC | MMPB | Hermanos Serdán International Airport | Puebla City, Puebla, Mexico | | |
| PBD | VAPR | Porbandar Airport | Porbandar, Gujarat, India | | |
| PBE | SKPR | Morela Airport (Puerto Berrío Airport) | Puerto Berrío, Colombia | | |
| PBF | KPBF | Grider Field | Pine Bluff, Arkansas, United States | | |
| PBG | KPBG | Plattsburgh International Airport | Plattsburgh, New York, United States | | |
| PBH | VQPR | Paro International Airport | Paro, Bhutan | | |
| PBI | KDJT | President Donald J. Trump International Airport | West Palm Beach, Florida, United States | | |
| PBJ | NVSI | Paama Airport | Paama, Vanuatu | | |
| PBL | SVPC | Bartolomé Salom Airport | Puerto Cabello, Venezuela | | |
| PBM | SMJP | Johan Adolf Pengel International Airport | Paramaribo, Suriname | | |
| PBN | FNPA | Porto Amboim Airport | Porto Amboim, Angola | | |
| PBO | YPBO | Paraburdoo Airport | Paraburdoo, Western Australia, Australia | | |
| PBP | MRIA | Punta Islita Airport | Punta Islita, Costa Rica | | |
| PBQ | SWPM | Pimenta Bueno Airport | Pimenta Bueno, Rondônia, Brazil | | |
| PBR | MGPB | Puerto Barrios Airport | Puerto Barrios, Guatemala | | |
| PBT | | Puerto Leda Airport | Puerto Leda, Paraguay | | |
| PBU | VYPT | Putao Airport | Putao, Myanmar | | |
| PBV | SWPG | Porto dos Gaúchos Airport | Porto dos Gaúchos, Mato Grosso, Brazil | | |
| PBX | SWPQ | Fazenda Piraguassu Airport | Porto Alegre do Norte, Mato Grosso, Brazil | | |
| PBZ | FAPG | Plettenberg Bay Airport | Plettenberg Bay, South Africa | | |
-PC-
| PCA | PAOC | Portage Creek Airport (FAA: A14) | Portage Creek, Alaska, United States | | |
| PCB | WIHP | Pondok Cabe Airport | South Tangerang, Indonesia | | |
| PCC | | Puerto Rico Airport | Puerto Rico, Colombia | | |
| PCD | KPDC | Prairie du Chien Municipal Airport (FAA: PDC) | Prairie du Chien, Wisconsin, United States | | |
| PCF | FAPS | Potchefstroom Airport | Potchefstroom, South Africa | | |
| PCH | MHPC | Palacios Airport | Palacios, Honduras | | |
| PCJ | | Puerto La Victoria Airport | Puerto Casado (La Victoria), Paraguay | | |
| PCL | SPCL | FAP Captain David Abensur Rengifo International Airport | Pucallpa, Peru | | |
| PCM | | Playa del Carmen Airport | Playa del Carmen, Quintana Roo, Mexico | | |
| PCN | NZOK | Picton Aerodrome | Picton, New Zealand | | |
| PCO | MMPL | Punta Colorada Airstrip | La Ribera, Baja California Sur, Mexico | | |
| PCP | FPPR | Príncipe Airport | Príncipe Island, São Tomé and Príncipe | | |
| PCQ | | Boun Neua Airport | Phongsaly, Laos | | |
| PCR | SKPC | Germán Olano Airport | Puerto Carreño, Colombia | | |
| PCS | SNPC | Picos Airport | Picos, Piauí, Brazil | | |
| PCT | | Princeton Airport (FAA: 39N) | Princeton / Rocky Hill, New Jersey, United States | | |
| PCU | | Poplarville-Pearl River County Airport (FAA: M13) | Poplarville, Mississippi, United States | | |
| PCV | | Punta Chivato Airstrip | Punta Chivato, Baja California Sur, Mexico | | |
-PD-
| PDA | SKPD | Obando Airport | Puerto Inírida, Colombia | | |
| PDB | | Pedro Bay Airport (FAA: 4K0) | Pedro Bay, Alaska, United States | | |
| PDC | NWWQ | Mueo/Nickel Airport | Mueo, New Caledonia | | |
| PDD | FQPO | Ponta do Ouro Airport | Ponta do Ouro, Mozambique | | |
| PDE | YPDI | Pandie Pandie Airport | Pandie Pandie Station, South Australia, Australia | | |
| PDF | SIAJ | Faz Taua Airport | Prado, Bahia, Brazil | | |
| PDG | WIPT | Minangkabau International Airport | Padang, Indonesia | | |
| PDI | | Pindiu Airport | Pindiu, Papua New Guinea | | |
| PDK | KPDK | DeKalb–Peachtree Airport | Atlanta, Georgia, United States | | |
| PDL | LPPD | João Paulo II Airport | Ponta Delgada, Azores, Portugal | | |
| PDM | | Pedasí Airport (Capt. J. Montenegro Airport) | Pedasí, Panama | | |
| PDN | | Parndana Airport | Parndana, South Australia, Australia | | |
| PDO | WIPQ | Pendopo Airport | Pendopo, Indonesia | | |
| PDP | SULS | Capitán de Corbeta Carlos A. Curbelo International Airport | Punta del Este, Uruguay | | |
| PDR | | Presidente Dutra Airport | Presidente Dutra, Maranhão, Brazil | | |
| PDS | MMPG | Piedras Negras International Airport | Piedras Negras, Coahuila, Mexico | | |
| PDT | KPDT | Eastern Oregon Regional Airport | Pendleton, Oregon, United States | | |
| PDU | SUPU | Tydeo Larre Borges International Airport | Paysandú, Uruguay | | |
| PDV | LBPD | Plovdiv Airport | Plovdiv, Bulgaria | | |
| PDX | KPDX | Portland International Airport | Portland, Oregon, United States | | |
| PDZ | SVPE | Pedernales Airport | Pedernales, Venezuela | | |
-PE-
| PEA | YPSH | Penneshaw Airport | Penneshaw, South Australia, Australia | | |
| PEB | | Pebane Airport | Pebane, Mozambique | | |
| PEC | | Pelican Seaplane Base | Pelican, Alaska, United States | | |
| PED | LKPD | Pardubice Airport | Pardubice, Czech Republic | | |
| PEE | USPP | Perm International Airport (Bolshoye Savino Airport) | Perm, Perm Krai, Russia | | |
| PEF | EDCP | Peenemünde Airfield | Peenemünde, Mecklenburg-Vorpommern, Germany | | |
| PEG | LIRZ | Perugia San Francesco d'Assisi – Umbria International Airport | Perugia, Umbria, Italy | | |
| PEH | SAZP | Comodoro Pedro Zanni Airport | Pehuajó, Buenos Aires, Argentina | | |
| PEI | SKPE | Matecaña International Airport | Pereira, Colombia | | |
| PEK | ZBAA | Beijing Capital International Airport | Beijing, China | UTC+08:00 | |
| PEL | FXPG | Pelaneng Airport | Pelaneng, Lesotho | | |
| PEM | SPTU | Padre Aldamiz International Airport | Puerto Maldonado, Peru | | |
| PEN | WMKP | Penang International Airport | Penang, Malaysia | | |
| PEP | | Peppimenarti Airport | Peppimenarti, Northern Territory, Australia | | |
| PEQ | KPEQ | Pecos Municipal Airport | Pecos, Texas, United States | | |
| PER | YPPH | Perth Airport | Perth, Western Australia, Australia | | |
| PES | ULPB | Petrozavodsk Airport (Besovets Airport) | Petrozavodsk, Karelia, Russia | | |
| PET | SBPK | João Simões Lopes Neto International Airport | Pelotas, Rio Grande do Sul, Brazil | | |
| PEU | MHPL | Puerto Lempira Airport | Puerto Lempira, Honduras | | |
| PEV | LHPP | Pécs-Pogány International Airport | Pécs, Hungary | | |
| PEW | OPPS | Bacha Khan International Airport | Peshawar, Pakistan | | |
| PEX | UUYP | Pechora Airport | Pechora, Komi Republic, Russia | | |
| PEY | | Penong Airport | Penong, South Australia, Australia | | |
| PEZ | UWPP | Penza Airport (Ternovka Airport) | Penza, Penza Oblast, Russia | | |
-PF-
| PFB | SBPF | Lauro Kurtz Airport | Passo Fundo, Rio Grande do Sul, Brazil | | |
| PFC | KPFC | Pacific City State Airport | Pacific City, Oregon, United States | | |
| PFJ | BIPA | Patreksfjörður Airport | Patreksfjörður, Iceland | | |
| PFM | | Primrose Aerodrome | Wood Buffalo, Alberta, Canada | | |
| PFO | LCPH | Paphos International Airport | Paphos, Cyprus | | |
| PFQ | OITP | Parsabad-Moghan Airport | Parsabad, Iran | | |
| PFR | FZVS | Ilebo Airport | Ilebo, Democratic Republic of the Congo | | |
-PG-
| PGA | KPGA | Page Municipal Airport | Page, Arizona, United States | | |
| PGB | | Pangoa Airport | Pangoa, Papua New Guinea | | |
| PGC | | Grant County Airport (FAA: W99) | Petersburg, West Virginia, United States | | |
| PGD | KPGD | Punta Gorda Airport | Punta Gorda, Florida, United States | | |
| PGE | | Yegepa Airport | Yegepa, Papua New Guinea | | |
| PGF | LFMP | Perpignan–Rivesaltes Airport | Perpignan, Languedoc-Roussillon, France | | |
| PGH | VIPT | Pantnagar Airport | Pantnagar, Uttarakhand, India | | |
| PGI | FNCH | Chitato Airport | Chitato, Angola | | |
| PGK | WIPK | Depati Amir Airport | Pangkal Pinang (Pangkalpinang), Indonesia | | |
| PGL | KPQL | Trent Lott International Airport (FAA: PQL) | Pascagoula, Mississippi, United States | | |
| PGM | | Port Graham Airport | Port Graham, Alaska, United States | | |
| PGN | | Pangia Airport | Pangia, Papua New Guinea | | |
| PGO | KPSO | Stevens Field (FAA: PSO) | Pagosa Springs, Colorado, United States | | |
| PGQ | WAEM | Buli Airport | Buli, North Maluku, Indonesia | | |
| PGR | KPGR | Kirk Field | Paragould, Arkansas, United States | | |
| PGS | | Grand Canyon Caverns Airport (FAA: L37) | Peach Springs, Arizona, United States | | |
| PGU | OIBP | Persian Gulf Airport | Asaluyeh (Asaloyeh), Iran | | |
| PGV | KPGV | Pitt–Greenville Airport | Greenville, North Carolina, United States | | |
| PGX | LFBX | Périgueux Bassillac Airport | Périgueux, Aquitaine, France | | |
| PGZ | SSZW | Comte. Antonio Amilton Beraldo Airport | Ponta Grossa, Paraná, Brazil | | |
-PH-
| PHA | VVPR | Phan Rang Air Base | Phan Rang–Tháp Chàm, Vietnam | | |
| PHB | SBPB | Parnaíba-Prefeito Dr. João Silva Filho International Airport | Parnaíba, Piauí, Brazil | | |
| PHC | DNPO | Port Harcourt International Airport | Port Harcourt, Nigeria | | |
| PHD | KPHD | Harry Clever Field | New Philadelphia, Ohio, United States | | |
| PHE | YPPD | Port Hedland International Airport | Port Hedland, Western Australia, Australia | | |
| PHF | KPHF | Newport News/Williamsburg International Airport | Newport News / Williamsburg, Virginia, United States | | |
| PHG | | Port Harcourt City Airport | Port Harcourt, Nigeria | | |
| PHH | VNPR | Pokhara International Airport | Pokhara, Gandaki Province, Nepal | | |
| PHI | SNYE | Pinheiro Airport | Pinheiro, Maranhão, Brazil | | |
| PHK | KPHK | Palm Beach County Glades Airport | Pahokee, Florida, United States | | |
| PHL | KPHL | Philadelphia International Airport | Philadelphia, Pennsylvania, United States | | |
| PHN | KPHN | St. Clair County International Airport | Port Huron, Michigan, United States | | |
| PHO | PAPO | Point Hope Airport | Point Hope, Alaska, United States | | |
| PHP | KPHP | Philip Airport | Philip, South Dakota, United States | | |
| PHQ | YTMO | The Monument Airport | Phosphate Hill, Queensland, Australia | | |
| PHR | NFND | Pacific Harbour Airport | Pacific Harbour, Fiji | | |
| PHS | VTPP | Phitsanulok Airport | Phitsanulok, Thailand | | |
| PHT | KPHT | Henry County Airport | Paris, Tennessee, United States | | |
| PHW | FAPH | Hendrik Van Eck Airport | Phalaborwa, South Africa | | |
| PHX | KPHX | Phoenix Sky Harbor International Airport | Phoenix, Arizona, United States | | |
| PHY | VTPB | Phetchabun Airport | Phetchabun, Thailand | | |
-PI-
| PIA | KPIA | General Wayne A. Downing Peoria International Airport | Peoria, Illinois, United States | | |
| PIB | KPIB | Hattiesburg–Laurel Regional Airport | Hattiesburg / Laurel, Mississippi, United States | | |
| PIC | MBPI | Pine Cay Airport | Pine Cay, British Overseas Territory of Turks and Caicos Islands | | |
| PIE | KPIE | St. Pete–Clearwater International Airport | St. Petersburg / Clearwater, United States | | |
| PIF | RCDC | Pingtung South Airport | Pingtung City, Taiwan | | |
| PIH | KPIH | Pocatello Regional Airport | Pocatello, Idaho, United States | | |
| PIK | EGPK | Glasgow Prestwick Airport | Glasgow, Scotland, United Kingdom | | |
| PIL | SGPI | Carlos Miguel Jiménez Airport | Pilar, Paraguay | | |
| PIM | KPIM | Harris County Airport | Pine Mountain, Georgia, United States | | |
| PIN | SWPI | Júlio Belém Airport | Parintins, Amazonas, Brazil | | |
| PIO | SPSO | Capitán FAP Renán Elías Olivera Airport | Pisco, Peru | | |
| PIP | PAPN | Pilot Point Airport (FAA: PNP) | Pilot Point, Alaska, United States | | |
| PIQ | | Pipillipai Airport | Pipillipai, Guyana | | |
| PIR | KPIR | Pierre Regional Airport | Pierre, South Dakota, United States | | |
| PIS | LFBI | Poitiers–Biard Airport | Poitiers, Poitou-Charentes, France | | |
| PIT | KPIT | Pittsburgh International Airport | Pittsburgh, Pennsylvania, United States | | |
| PIU | SPUR | FAP Captain Guillermo Concha Iberico International Airport | Piura, Peru | | |
| PIV | SNPX | Pirapora Airport | Pirapora, Minas Gerais, Brazil | | |
| PIW | CZMN | Pikwitonei Airport | Pikwitonei, Manitoba, Canada | | |
| PIX | LPPI | Pico Airport | Pico Island, Azores, Portugal | | |
| PIZ | PPIZ | Point Lay LRRS Airport | Point Lay, Alaska, United States | | |
-PJ-
| PJA | ESUP | Pajala Airport | Pajala, Sweden | | |
| PJB | KPAN | Payson Airport (FAA: PAN) | Payson, Arizona, United States | | |
| PJC | SGPJ | Dr. Augusto Roberto Fuster International Airport | Pedro Juan Caballero, Paraguay | | |
| PJG | OPPG | Panjgur Airport | Panjgur, Pakistan | | |
| PJM | MRPJ | Puerto Jiménez Airport | Puerto Jiménez, Costa Rica | | |
-PK-
| PKA | PAPK | Napaskiak Airport | Napaskiak, Alaska, United States | | |
| PKB | KPKB | Mid-Ohio Valley Regional Airport | Parkersburg, West Virginia, United States | | |
| PKC | UHPP | Petropavlovsk-Kamchatsky Airport (Yelizovo Airport) | Petropavlovsk-Kamchatsky, Kamchatka Krai, Russia | | |
| PKD | KPKD | Park Rapids Municipal Airport (Konshok Field) | Park Rapids, Minnesota, United States | | |
| PKE | YPKS | Parkes Airport | Parkes, New South Wales, Australia | | |
| PKF | KPKF | Park Falls Municipal Airport | Park Falls, Wisconsin, United States | | |
| PKG | WMPA | Pangkor Airport | Pangkor Island, Perak, Malaysia | | |
| PKH | LGHL | Porto Cheli Airport | Porto Cheli (Portochelion), Greece | | |
| PKJ | MGPG | Playa Grande Airport | Playa Grande, Guatemala | | |
| PKK | VYPU | Pakokku Airport | Pakokku, Myanmar | | |
| PKM | | Port Kaituma Airport | Port Kaituma, Guyana | | |
| PKN | WAOI | Iskandar Airport | Pangkalan Bun (Pangkalanbuun), Indonesia | | |
| PKO | DBBP | Parakou Airport | Parakou, Benin | | |
| PKP | NTGP | Puka-Puka Airport | Puka-Puka, Tuamotus, French Polynesia | | |
| PKR | VNPK | Pokhara Airport | Pokhara, Nepal | | |
| PKT | YKPT | Port Keats Airfield | Wadeye (Port Keats), Northern Territory, Australia | | |
| PKU | WIBB | Sultan Syarif Kasim II International Airport | Pekanbaru, Indonesia | | |
| PKV | ULOO | Pskov Airport | Pskov, Pskov Oblast, Russia | | |
| PKW | FBSP | Selebi-Phikwe Airport | Selebi-Phikwe, Botswana | | |
| PKX | ZBAD | Beijing Daxing International Airport | Beijing, China | UTC+08:00 | |
| PKY | WAGG | Tjilik Riwut Airport | Palangkaraya, Indonesia | | |
| PKZ | VLPS | Pakse International Airport | Pakse, Laos | | |
-PL-
| PLA | | Planadas Airport | Planadas, Colombia | | |
| PLC | | Planeta Rica Airport | Planeta Rica, Colombia | | |
| PLD | MRCR | Carrillo Airport (Playa Samara/Carrillo Airport) | Sámara / Puerto Carrillo, Costa Rica | | |
| PLE | | Paiela Airport | Paiela, Papua New Guinea | | |
| PLF | FTTP | Pala Airport | Pala, Chad | | |
| PLH | EGHD | Plymouth City Airport | Plymouth, England, United Kingdom | | |
| PLI | | Palm Island Airport | Palm Island, Saint Vincent and the Grenadines | | |
| PLJ | MZPL | Placencia Airport | Placencia, Belize | | |
| PLK | KPLK | M. Graham Clark Downtown Airport | Point Lookout, Missouri, United States | | |
| PLL | SBMN | Manaus Air Force Base | Manaus, Amazonas, Brazil | | |
| PLM | WIPP | Sultan Mahmud Badaruddin II International Airport | Palembang, Indonesia | | |
| PLN | KPLN | Pellston Regional Airport (Emmet County) | Pellston, Michigan, United States | | |
| PLO | YPLC | Port Lincoln Airport | Port Lincoln, South Australia, Australia | | |
| PLP | MPLP | Captain Ramon Xatruch Airport | La Palma, Panama | | |
| PLQ | EYPA | Palanga International Airport | Palanga, Lithuania | | |
| PLR | KPLR | St. Clair County Airport | Pell City, Alabama, United States | | |
| PLS | MBPV | Providenciales International Airport | Providenciales, British Overseas Territory of Turks and Caicos Islands | | |
| PLT | SKPL | Plato Airport | Plato, Colombia | | |
| PLU | SBBH | Belo Horizonte/Pampulha – Carlos Drummond de Andrade Airport | Belo Horizonte, Minas Gerais, Brazil | | |
| PLV | UKHP | Poltava Airport | Poltava, Ukraine | | |
| PLW | WAFF | Mutiara Airport | Palu, Indonesia | | |
| PLX | UASS | Semey Airport | Semey, Kazakhstan | | |
| PLY | | Plymouth Municipal Airport (FAA: C65) | Plymouth, Indiana, United States | | |
| PLZ | FAPE | Port Elizabeth Airport | Port Elizabeth, South Africa | | |
-PM-
| PMA | HTPE | Pemba Airport | Pemba Island, Tanzania | | |
| PMB | KPMB | Pembina Municipal Airport | Pembina, North Dakota, United States | | |
| PMC | SCTE | El Tepual Airport | Puerto Montt, Chile | | |
| PMD | KPMD | Palmdale Regional Airport | Palmdale, California, United States | | |
| PMF | LIMP | Parma Airport (Giuseppe Verdi Airport) | Parma, Emilia-Romagna, Italy | | |
| PMG | SBPP | Ponta Porã International Airport | Ponta Porã, Mato Grosso do Sul, Brazil | | |
| PMH | KPMH | Greater Portsmouth Regional Airport | Portsmouth, Ohio, United States | | |
| PMI | LEPA | Palma de Mallorca Airport | Palma de Mallorca, Balearic Islands, Spain | | |
| PMK | YPAM | Palm Island Airport | Palm Island, Queensland, Australia | | |
| PML | PAAL | Port Moller Airport (FAA: 1AK3) | Cold Bay, Alaska, United States | | |
| PMN | | Pumani Airport | Pumani, Papua New Guinea | | |
| PMO | LICJ | Falcone–Borsellino Airport (Punta Raisi Airport) | Palermo, Sicily, Italy | | |
| PMP | | Pimaga Airport | Pimaga, Papua New Guinea | | |
| PMQ | SAWP | Perito Moreno Airport | Perito Moreno, Santa Cruz, Argentina | | |
| PMR | NZPM | Palmerston North Airport | Palmerston North, New Zealand | | |
| PMS | OSPR | Palmyra Airport | Palmyra (Tadmur), Syria | | |
| PMT | | Paramakatoi Airport | Paramakatoi, Guyana | | |
| PMV | SVMG | Santiago Mariño Caribbean International Airport | Porlamar, Venezuela | | |
| PMW | SBPJ | Palmas–Brigadeiro Lysias Rodrigues Airport | Palmas, Tocantins, Brazil | | |
| PMX | | Metropolitan Airport (FAA: 13MA) | Palmer, Massachusetts, United States | | |
| PMY | SAVY | El Tehuelche Airport | Puerto Madryn, Chubut, Argentina | | |
| PMZ | MRPM | Palmar Sur Airport | Palmar Sur, Costa Rica | | |
-PN-
| PNA | LEPP | Pamplona Airport | Pamplona, Navarre, Spain | | |
| PNB | SBPN | Porto Nacional Airport | Porto Nacional, Tocantins, Brazil | | |
| PNC | KPNC | Ponca City Regional Airport | Ponca City, Oklahoma, United States | | |
| PND | MZPG | Punta Gorda Airport | Punta Gorda, Belize | | |
| PNE | KPNE | Northeast Philadelphia Airport | Philadelphia, Pennsylvania, United States | | |
| PNG | SSPG | Santos Dumont Airport | Paranaguá, Paraná, Brazil | | |
| PNH | VDPP | Phnom Penh International Airport | Phnom Penh, Cambodia | | |
| PNI | PTPN | Pohnpei International Airport | Pohnpei, Federated States of Micronesia | | |
| PNJ | | Penglai Shahekou Airport | Penglai, Shandong, China | UTC+08:00 | |
| PNK | WIOO | Supadio Airport | Pontianak, Indonesia | | |
| PNL | LICG | Pantelleria Airport | Pantelleria, Sicily, Italy | | |
| PNN | KPNN | Princeton Municipal Airport | Princeton, Maine, United States | | |
| PNP | AYGR | Girua Airport | Popondetta, Papua New Guinea | | |
| PNQ | VAPO | Pune Airport | Pune, Maharashtra, India | | |
| PNR | FCPP | Pointe Noire Airport | Pointe-Noire, Republic of the Congo | | |
| PNS | KPNS | Pensacola International Airport | Pensacola, Florida, United States | | |
| PNT | SCNT | Teniente Julio Gallardo Airport | Puerto Natales, Chile | | |
| PNU | | Panguitch Municipal Airport (FAA: U55) | Panguitch, Utah, United States | | |
| PNV | EYPP | Panevėžys Air Base (Pajuostis Airport) | Panevėžys, Lithuania | | |
| PNX | KGYI | North Texas Regional Airport (FAA: GYI) | Sherman / Denison, Texas, United States | UTC−06:00 | Mar-Nov |
| PNY | VOTY | Puducherry Airport | Pondicherry, Puducherry, India | | |
| PNZ | SBPL | Senador Nilo Coelho Airport | Petrolina, Pernambuco, Brazil | | |
-PO-
| POA | SBPA | Salgado Filho International Airport | Porto Alegre, Rio Grande do Sul, Brazil | | |
| POB | KPOB | Pope Field (Pope AFB) | Fort Bragg, North Carolina, United States | | |
| POC | KPOC | Brackett Field | La Verne, California, United States | | |
| POD | GOSP | Podor Airport | Podor, Senegal | | |
| POE | KPOE | Maks Army Airfield | Fort Johnson, Louisiana, United States | | |
| POF | KPOF | Poplar Bluff Municipal Airport | Poplar Bluff, Missouri, United States | | |
| POG | FOOG | Port-Gentil International Airport | Port-Gentil, Gabon | | |
| POH | KPOH | Pocahontas Municipal Airport | Pocahontas, Iowa, United States | | |
| POI | SLPO | Captain Nicolas Rojas Airport | Potosí, Bolivia | | |
| POJ | SNPD | Pedro Pereira dos Santos Airport | Patos de Minas, Minas Gerais, Brazil | | |
| POL | FQPB | Pemba Airport | Pemba, Mozambique | | |
| POM | AYPY | Jacksons International Airport | Port Moresby, Papua New Guinea | | |
| PON | MGPP | Poptún Airport | Poptún, Guatemala | | |
| POO | SBPC | Poços de Caldas Airport | Poços de Caldas, Minas Gerais, Brazil | | |
| POP | MDPP | Gregorio Luperón International Airport | San Felipe de Puerto Plata, Dominican Republic | | |
| POR | EFPO | Pori Airport | Pori, Finland | | |
| POS | TTPP | Piarco International Airport | Port of Spain, Trinidad and Tobago | | |
| POT | MKKJ | Ken Jones Aerodrome | Port Antonio, Jamaica | | |
| POU | KPOU | Dutchess County Airport | Poughkeepsie, New York, United States | | |
| POV | LZPW | Prešov Air Base | Prešov, Slovakia | | |
| POW | LJPZ | Portorož Airport | Portorož, Slovenia | | |
| POX | LFPT | Pontoise – Cormeilles Aerodrome | Paris, Île-de-France, France | | |
| POY | KPOY | Powell Municipal Airport | Powell / Lovell, Wyoming, United States | | |
| POZ | EPPO | Poznań–Ławica Airport | Poznań, Poland | | |
-PP-
| PPA | KPPA | Perry Lefors Field | Pampa, Texas, United States | | |
| PPB | SBDN | Presidente Prudente Airport | Presidente Prudente, São Paulo, Brazil | | |
| PPC | PAPR | Prospect Creek Airport | Prospect Creek, Alaska, United States | | |
| PPE | MMPE | Puerto Peñasco International Airport | Puerto Peñasco, Sonora, Mexico | | |
| PPF | KPPF | Tri-City Airport | Parsons, Kansas, United States | | |
| PPG | NSTU | Pago Pago International Airport | Pago Pago, American Samoa | | |
| PPH | | Parai-tepuí Airport | Parai-tepuí (Peraitepuy), Venezuela | | |
| PPI | YPIR | Port Pirie Airport | Port Pirie, South Australia, Australia | | |
| PPJ | WIIG | Panjang Island Airport | Panjang Island, Indonesia | | |
| PPK | UACP | Petropavl Airport | Petropavl (Petropavlovsk), Kazakhstan | | |
| PPL | VNPL | Phaplu Airport | Phaphlu, Nepal | | |
| PPM | KPMP | Pompano Beach Airpark (FAA: PMP) | Pompano Beach, Florida, United States | | |
| PPN | SKPP | Guillermo León Valencia Airport | Popayán, Colombia | | |
| PPP | YBPN | Whitsunday Coast Airport | Proserpine, Queensland, Australia | | |
| PPQ | NZPP | Kapiti Coast Airport | Paraparaumu Beach, New Zealand | | |
| PPR | WIDE | Tuanku Tambusai Airport | Pasir Pangaraian (Pasir Pangarayan), Indonesia | | |
| PPS | RPVP | Puerto Princesa International Airport | Puerto Princesa, Philippines | | |
| PPT | NTAA | Fa'a'ā International Airport | Papeete, Tahiti, French Polynesia | | |
| PPU | VYPP | Papun Airport | Papun, Myanmar | | |
| PPV | | Port Protection Seaplane Base (FAA: 19P) | Port Protection, Alaska, United States | | |
| PPW | EGEP | Papa Westray Airport | Papa Westray, Scotland, United Kingdom | | |
| PPX | | Param Airport | Param, Papua New Guinea | | |
| PPY | SNZA | Pouso Alegre Airport | Pouso Alegre, Minas Gerais, Brazil | | |
| PPZ | | Puerto Páez Airport | Puerto Páez, Venezuela | | |
-PQ-
| PQC | VVPQ | Phu Quoc International Airport | Phu Quoc Island, Vietnam | | |
| PQD | | Batticaloa Seaplane Base | Batticaloa, Sri Lanka | | |
| PQI | KPQI | Northern Maine Regional Airport at Presque Isle | Presque Isle, Maine, United States | | |
| PQM | MMPQ | Palenque International Airport | Palenque, Chiapas, Mexico | | |
| PQQ | YPMQ | Port Macquarie Airport | Port Macquarie, New South Wales, Australia | | |
| PQS | | Pilot Station Airport (FAA: 0AK) | Pilot Station, Alaska, United States | | |
-PR-
| PRA | SAAP | General Justo José de Urquiza Airport | Paraná, Entre Ríos, Argentina | | |
| PRB | KPRB | Paso Robles Municipal Airport | Paso Robles, California, United States | | |
| PRC | KPRC | Ernest A. Love Field | Prescott, Arizona, United States | | |
| PRD | YPDO | Pardoo Airport | Pardoo Station, Western Australia, Australia | | |
| PRE | | Pore Airport | Pore, Colombia | | |
| PRG | LKPR | Václav Havel Airport Prague | Prague, Czech Republic | | |
| PRH | VTCP | Phrae Airport | Phrae, Thailand | | |
| PRI | FSPP | Praslin Island Airport | Praslin Island, Seychelles | | |
| PRK | FAPK | Prieska Airport | Prieska, South Africa | | |
| PRM | LPPM | Portimão Airport | Portimão, Portugal | | |
| PRN | BKPR | Pristina International Airport Adem Jashari | Pristina, Kosovo | | |
| PRO | KPRO | Perry Municipal Airport | Perry, Iowa, United States | | |
| PRP | LFKO | Propriano Airport | Propriano, Corsica, France | | |
| PRQ | SARS | Presidencia Roque Sáenz Peña Airport | Presidencia Roque Sáenz Peña, Chaco, Argentina | | |
| PRR | SYPR | Paruima Airport | Paruima, Guyana | | |
| PRS | AGGP | Parasi Airport | Parasi, Solomon Islands | | |
| PRU | VYPY | Pyay Airport | Pyay (Prome), Myanmar | | |
| PRV | LKPO | Přerov Airport | Přerov, Czech Republic | | |
| PRW | | Prentice Airport (FAA: 5N2) | Prentice, Wisconsin, United States | | |
| PRX | KPRX | Cox Field | Paris, Texas, United States | | |
| PRY | FAWB | Wonderboom Airport | Pretoria, South Africa | | |
| PRZ | | Prineville Airport (FAA: S39) | Prineville, Oregon, United States | | |
-PS-
| PSA | LIRP | Pisa International Airport (Galileo Galilei Airport) | Pisa, Tuscany, Italy | | |
| PSB | KPSB | Mid-State Regional Airport | Rush Township, Centre County, Pennsylvania, United States | | |
| PSC | KPSC | Tri-Cities Airport | Pasco, Washington, United States | | |
| PSD | HEPS | Port Said Airport | Port Said, Egypt | | |
| PSE | TJPS | Mercedita Airport | Ponce, Puerto Rico | | |
| PSF | KPSF | Pittsfield Municipal Airport | Pittsfield, Massachusetts, United States | | |
| PSG | PAPG | Petersburg James A. Johnson Airport | Petersburg, Alaska, United States | | |
| PSH | EDXO | Sankt Peter-Ording Airport | Sankt Peter-Ording, Schleswig-Holstein, Germany | | |
| PSI | OPPI | Pasni Airport | Pasni, Pakistan | | |
| PSJ | WAMP | Kasiguncu Airport | Poso, Indonesia | | |
| PSK | KPSK | New River Valley Airport | Dublin, Virginia, United States | | |
| PSL | EGPT | Perth Airport (Scone Airport) | Perth, Scotland, United Kingdom | | |
| PSM | KPSM | Portsmouth International Airport at Pease | Portsmouth, New Hampshire, United States | | |
| PSN | KPSN | Palestine Municipal Airport | Palestine, Texas, United States | | |
| PSO | SKPS | Antonio Nariño Airport | Pasto, Colombia | | |
| PSP | KPSP | Palm Springs International Airport | Palm Springs, California, United States | | |
| PSQ | | Philadelphia Seaplane Base (FAA: 9N2) | Philadelphia, Pennsylvania, United States | | |
| PSR | LIBP | Abruzzo Airport | Pescara, Abruzzo, Italy | | |
| PSS | SARP | Libertador General José de San Martín Airport | Posadas, Misiones, Argentina | | |
| PSU | WIOP | Pangsuma Airport | Putussibau, Indonesia | | |
| PSV | | Papa Stour Airstrip | Papa Stour, Scotland, United Kingdom | | |
| PSW | SNOS | Passos Airport | Passos, Minas Gerais, Brazil | | |
| PSX | KPSX | Palacios Municipal Airport | Palacios, Texas, United States | | |
| PSY | SFAL | Port Stanley Airport | Stanley, British Overseas Territory of Falkland Islands | | |
| PSZ | SLPS | Puerto Suárez International Airport | Puerto Suárez, Bolivia | | |
-PT-
| PTA | PALJ | Port Alsworth Airport (FAA: TPO) | Port Alsworth, Alaska, United States | | |
| PTB | KPTB | Dinwiddie County Airport | Petersburg, Virginia, United States | | |
| PTC | | Port Alice Seaplane Base (FAA: 16K) | Port Alice, Alaska, United States | | |
| PTD | PAAP | Port Alexander Seaplane Base (FAA: AHP) | Port Alexander, Alaska, United States | | |
| PTF | NFFO | Malolo Lailai Airport | Malolo Lailai, Fiji | | |
| PTG | FAPP | Polokwane International Airport | Polokwane, South Africa | | |
| PTH | PAPH | Port Heiden Airport | Port Heiden, Alaska, United States | | |
| PTJ | YPOD | Portland Airport | Portland, Victoria, Australia | | |
| PTK | KPTK | Oakland County International Airport | Pontiac, Michigan, United States | | |
| PTM | SVPT | Palmarito Airport | Palmarito, Venezuela | | |
| PTN | KPTN | Harry P. Williams Memorial Airport | Patterson, Louisiana, United States | | |
| PTO | SSPB | Juvenal Loureiro Cardoso Airport | Pato Branco, Paraná, Brazil | | |
| PTP | TFFR | Pointe-à-Pitre International Airport (Le Raizet Airport) | Pointe-à-Pitre, Guadeloupe | | |
| PTQ | SNMZ | Porto de Moz Airport | Porto de Moz, Pará, Brazil | | |
| PTS | KPTS | Atkinson Municipal Airport | Pittsburg, Kansas, United States | | |
| PTT | KPTT | Pratt Regional Airport | Pratt, Kansas, United States | | |
| PTU | PAPM | Platinum Airport | Platinum, Alaska, United States | | |
| PTV | KPTV | Porterville Municipal Airport | Porterville, California, United States | | |
| PTW | KPTW | Heritage Field | Pottstown, Pennsylvania, United States | | |
| PTX | SKPI | Contador Airport | Pitalito, Colombia | | |
| PTY | MPTO | Tocumen International Airport | Panama City, Panama | | |
| PTZ | SEPA | Río Amazonas Airport | Shell, Ecuador | | |
-PU-
| PUA | | Puas Airport | Puas, Papua New Guinea | | |
| PUB | KPUB | Pueblo Memorial Airport | Pueblo, Colorado, United States | | |
| PUC | KPUC | Carbon County Regional Airport | Price, Utah, United States | | |
| PUD | SAWD | Puerto Deseado Airport | Puerto Deseado, Santa Cruz, Argentina | | |
| PUE | MPOA | Puerto Obaldia Airport | Puerto Obaldía, Panama | | |
| PUF | LFBP | Pau Pyrénées Airport | Pau, Aquitaine, France | | |
| PUG | YPAG | Port Augusta Airport | Port Augusta, South Australia, Australia | | |
| PUI | | Pureni Airport | Pureni, Papua New Guinea | | |
| PUJ | MDPC | Punta Cana International Airport | Punta Cana, Dominican Republic | | |
| PUK | NTGQ | Pukarua Airport | Pukarua, Tuamotus, French Polynesia | | |
| PUL | | Port of Poulsbo Marina Moorage Seaplane Base (FAA: 83Q) | Poulsbo, Washington, United States | | |
| PUN | FZOP | Punia Airport | Punia, Democratic Republic of the Congo | | |
| PUP | DFCP | Pô Airport | Pô, Burkina Faso | | |
| PUQ | SCCI | Presidente Carlos Ibáñez del Campo International Airport | Punta Arenas, Chile | | |
| PUR | SLPR | Puerto Rico Airport | Puerto Rico, Bolivia | | |
| PUS | RKPK | Gimhae International Airport | Busan, South Korea | | |
| PUT | VOPN | Sri Sathya Sai Airport | Puttaparthi, Andhra Pradesh, India | | |
| PUU | SKAS | Tres de Mayo Airport | Puerto Asís, Colombia | | |
| PUV | NWWP | Malabou Airport | Poum, New Caledonia | | |
| PUW | KPUW | Pullman–Moscow Regional Airport | Pullman / Moscow (ID), Washington, United States | | |
| PUX | SCPV | El Mirador Airport | Puerto Varas, Chile | | |
| PUY | LDPL | Pula Airport | Pula, Croatia | | |
| PUZ | MNPC | Puerto Cabezas Airport | Puerto Cabezas, Nicaragua | | |
-PV-
| PVA | SKPV | El Embrujo Airport | Providencia Island, Colombia | | |
| PVC | KPVC | Provincetown Municipal Airport | Provincetown, Massachusetts, United States | | |
| PVD | KPVD | Theodore Francis Green State Airport | Providence, Rhode Island, United States | | |
| PVE | MPVR | El Porvenir Airport | El Porvenir, Panama | | |
| PVF | KPVF | Placerville Airport | Placerville, California, United States | | |
| PVG | ZSPD | Shanghai Pudong International Airport | Shanghai, China | UTC+08:00 | |
| PVH | SBPV | Governador Jorge Teixeira de Oliveira International Airport | Porto Velho, Rondônia, Brazil | | |
| PVI | SSPI | Edu Chaves Airport | Paranavaí, Paraná, Brazil | | |
| PVK | LGPZ | Aktion National Airport | Preveza / Lefkada, Greece | | |
| PVL | KPBX | Pike County Airport (FAA: PBX) | Pikeville, Kentucky, United States | | |
| PVO | SEPV | Reales Tamarindos Airport | Portoviejo, Ecuador | | |
| PVR | MMPR | Licenciado Gustavo Díaz Ordaz International Airport | Puerto Vallarta, Jalisco, Mexico | | |
| PVS | UHMD | Provideniya Bay Airport | Provideniya, Chukotka, Russia | | |
| PVU | KPVU | Provo Municipal Airport | Provo, Utah, United States | | |
| PVW | KPVW | Hale County Airport | Plainview, Texas, United States | | |
-PW-
| PWA | KPWA | Wiley Post Airport | Oklahoma City, Oklahoma, United States | | |
| PWD | KPWD | Sher-Wood Airport | Plentywood, Montana, United States | | |
| PWE | UHMP | Pevek Airport | Pevek, Chukotka, Russia | | |
| PWI | | Beles Airport | Pawi, Ethiopia | | |
| PWK | KPWK | Chicago Executive Airport | Chicago, Illinois, United States | | |
| PWL | WICP | Wirasaba Airport | Purwokerto, Indonesia | | |
| PWM | KPWM | Portland International Jetport | Portland, Maine, United States | | |
| PWN | MYCP | Pitts Town Airport | Pitts Town, Crooked Island, Bahamas | | |
| PWO | FZQC | Pweto Airport | Pweto, Democratic Republic of the Congo | | |
| PWQ | UASP | Pavlodar Airport | Pavlodar, Kazakhstan | | |
| PWR | | Port Walter Seaplane Base | Port Walter, Alaska, United States | | |
| PWT | KPWT | Bremerton National Airport | Bremerton, Washington, United States | | |
| PWY | KPNA | Ralph Wenz Field (FAA: PNA) | Pinedale, Wyoming, United States | | |
| PWX | WAFZ | Panua Pohuwato Airport | Gorontalo, Indonesia | | |
-PX-
| PXA | WIPY | Atung Bungsu Airport | Pagar Alam, South Sumatra, Indonesia | | |
| PXH | YPMH | Prominent Hill Airport | Prominent Hill, South Australia, Australia | | |
| PXL | | Polacca Airport (FAA: P10) | Polacca, Arizona, United States | | |
| PXM | MMPS | Puerto Escondido International Airport | Puerto Escondido, Oaxaca, Mexico | | |
| PXN | VEPU | Purnea Airport | Purnia, Bihar, India | | |
| PXO | LPPS | Porto Santo Airport | Porto Santo Island, Madeira, Portugal | | |
| PXR | VTUJ | Surin Airport | Surin, Thailand | | |
| PXU | VVPK | Pleiku Airport | Pleiku, Vietnam | | |
-PY-
| PYA | SKVL | Velasquez Airport | Puerto Boyacá, Colombia | | |
| PYB | VEJP | Jeypore Airport | Jeypore, Odisha, India | | |
| PYC | | Playón Chico Airport | Ukupseni (Playón Chico), Panama | | |
| PYE | NCPY | Tongareva Airport | Penrhyn Atoll, Cook Islands | | |
| PYG | | Pakyong Airport | Pakyong, Sikkim, India | | |
| PYH | SVPA | Cacique Aramare Airport | Puerto Ayacucho, Venezuela | | |
| PYJ | UERP | Polyarny Airport | Polyarny, Yakutia, Russia | | |
| PYK | OIIP | Payam International Airport | Karaj, Iran | | |
| PYL | | Perry Island Seaplane Base | Perry Island, Alaska, United States | | |
| PYM | KPYM | Plymouth Municipal Airport | Plymouth, Massachusetts, United States | | |
| PYN | | Payán Airport | Payán, Colombia | | |
| PYO | SEPT | Putumayo Airport | Puerto El Carmen de Putumayo, Ecuador | | |
| PYR | LGAD | Andravida Air Base | Pyrgos, Greece | | |
| PYS | | Paradise Skypark (FAA: CA92) | Paradise, California, United States | | |
| PYV | | Yaviza Airport | Yaviza, Panama | | |
| PYY | | Pai Airport | Pai, Thailand | | |
-PZ-
| PZA | SKPZ | Paz de Ariporo Airport | Paz de Ariporo, Colombia | | |
| PZB | FAPM | Pietermaritzburg Airport | Pietermaritzburg, South Africa | | |
| PZH | OPZB | Zhob Airport | Zhob, Pakistan | | |
| PZI | ZUZH | Panzhihua Bao'anying Airport | Panzhihua, Sichuan, China | UTC+08:00 | |
| PZK | NCPK | Pukapuka Island Airport | Pukapuka Island, Cook Islands | | |
| PZL | FADQ | Zulu Inyala Airport | Phinda, South Africa | | |
| PZO | SVPR | Manuel Carlos Piar Guayana Airport | Ciudad Guayana / Puerto Ordaz, Venezuela | | |
| PZS | SCTC | Maquehue Airport | Temuco, Chile | | |
| PZU | HSPN | Port Sudan New International Airport | Port Sudan, Sudan | | |
| PZY | LZPP | Piešťany Airport | Piešťany, Slovakia | | |

== Notes ==
- ^1 PAR is common IATA code for Charles de Gaulle Airport (IATA: CDG), Orly Airport (IATA: ORY), Paris–Le Bourget Airport (IATA: LBG), Beauvais–Tillé Airport (IATA: BVA), Pontoise – Cormeilles Aerodrome (IATA: POX), Châlons Vatry Airport (IATA: XCR) and Vélizy – Villacoublay Air Base (IATA: VIY).
