= List of accidents and incidents involving the DC-3 in the 1990s =

This is a list of accidents and incidents involving the Douglas DC-3^{A} that have taken place in the period 1990–1999, including aircraft based on the DC-3 airframe such as the Douglas C-47 Skytrain, Basler BT-67 and Lisunov Li-2. Military accidents are included; and hijackings and incidents of terrorism are covered, although acts of war are outside the scope of this list.

== 1990 ==
18 March
In Honduras, Douglas DC-3A HR-SAZ of SAHSA overran the runway on landing at Juan Manuel Gálvez International Airport, Roatán and ended up in the sea. The aircraft, performing a domestic scheduled passenger service, was damaged beyond repair but all 32 people on board escaped.

28 April
In the Philippines, Douglas C-47A RP-C81 of Manila Aero Transport System (MATS) crashed shortly after take-off from Ninoy Aquino International Airport on a non-scheduled domestic passenger flight to Roxas Airport following an engine failure. MATS did not have a licence to fly passengers. Seven of the twenty-two passengers were killed. The aircraft had earlier made a forced landing on a taxiway at Manila.

19 May
In the United States, Douglas C-53D N1FN operated by K & K Aircraft crashed at Capon Bridge, West Virginia after hitting power lines while engaged in crop spraying. Both crew were killed.

24 July
Douglas C-47A RP-C140 of Victoria Air was damaged beyond repair in a forced landing at San Juan in the Philippines, after the starboard engine developed a vibration.

19 October
In Bolivia, Douglas C-47B CP-735 of Bolivian Air Flight International crashed in the Andes on a cargo flight from Bella Vista to El Alto International Airport, La Paz, killing all four people on board. The wreckage was not discovered for six years.

4 December
a Douglas C-47 of the Salvadoran Air Force was shot down by a SA-14 missile, crashing near Chalatenango in El Salvador. All five people on board were killed.

== 1991 ==
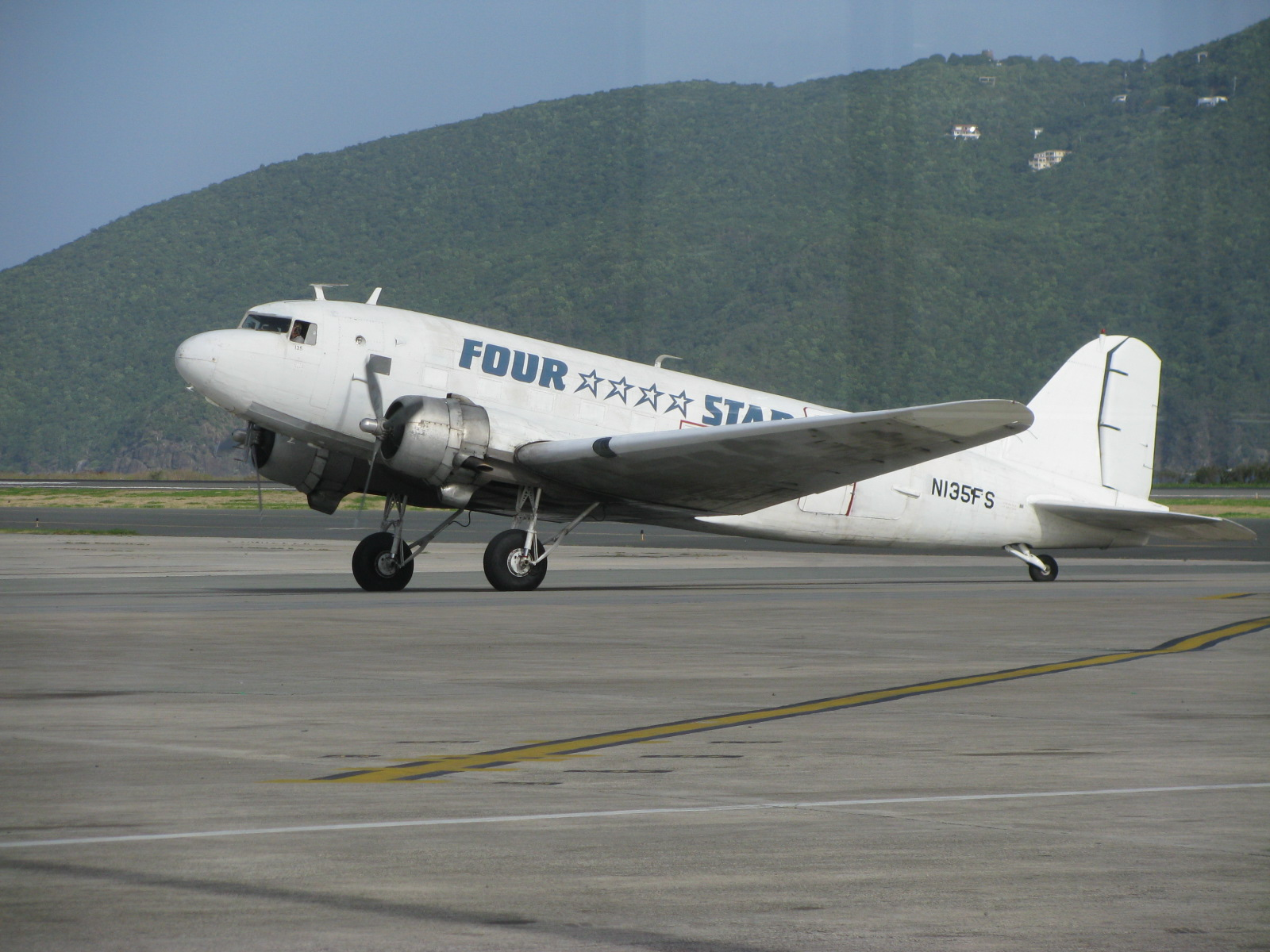
DC-3 of Four Star Air Cargo

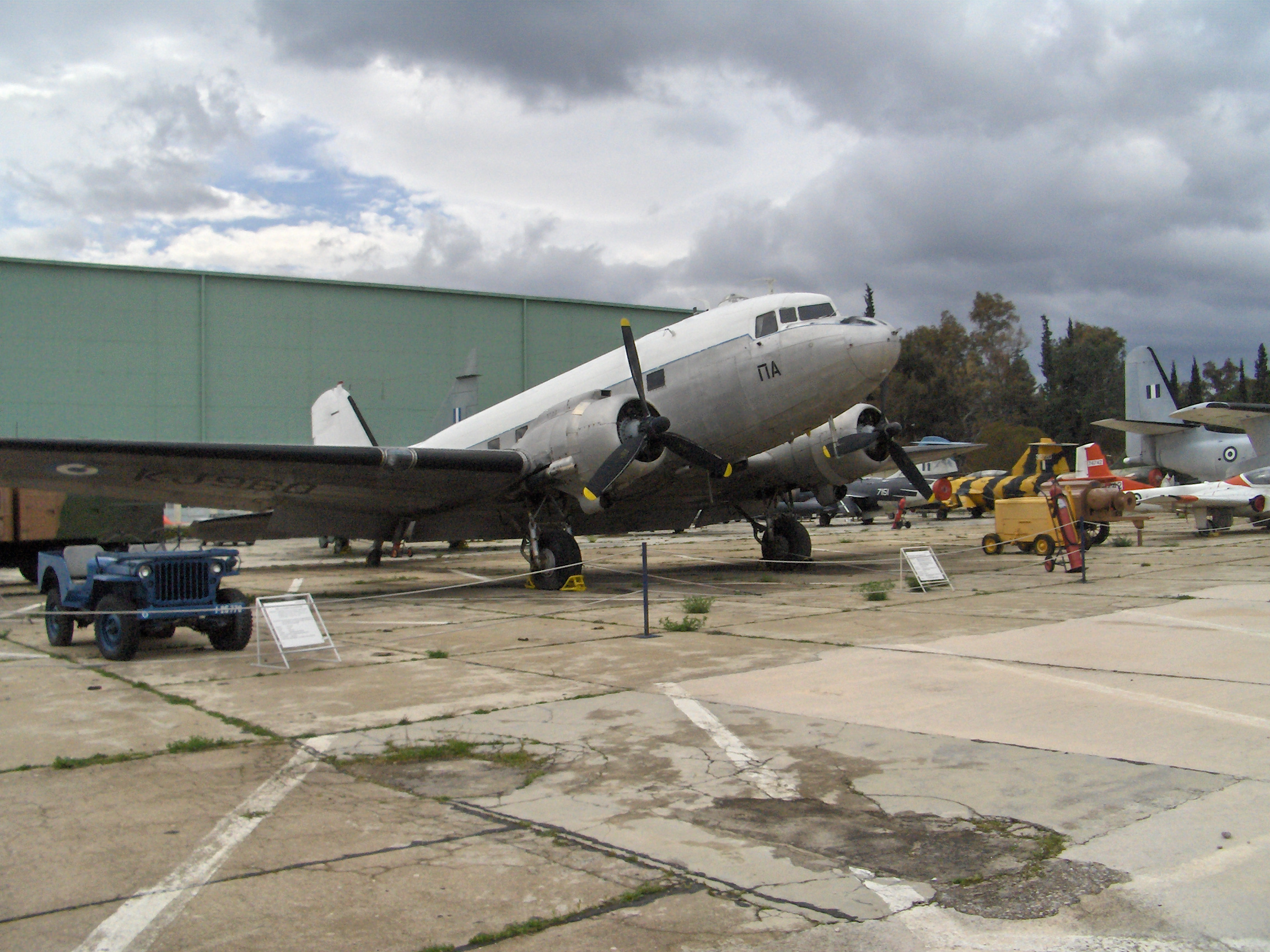
Hellenic Air Force C-47

4 January
In Spain, Douglas DC-3 EC-EQH of Aeromarket Express overran the runway at Palma de Mallorca Airport on a cargo flight to Menorca Airport and was damaged beyond repair.

4 April
Douglas C-47B C-FQNF of Central Mountain Air Services crashed on the frozen surface of Thutade Lake in the Canadian province of British Columbia, killing six of the seven occupants. The aircraft was on a passenger flight from Sturdee Airport to Smithers Airport.

10 May
Douglas R4D-7 N134FS of Four Star Air Cargo was damaged beyond repair when it crashed shortly after take-off from Rafael Hernández Airport in Aguadilla, Puerto Rico following an engine failure and stall. Both crew were killed. The aircraft was on a cargo flight to Mercedita Airport, Ponce, Puerto Rico.

15 May
Douglas C-47B HK-3177 of Aerolíneas del Este crashed at La Poyatta, Colombia killing 13 of the 14 people on board. The aircraft was on a non-scheduled passenger flight from La Vanguardia Airport, Villavicencio to Miraflores Airport, Miraflores, Guaviare. The passengers were told to jettison the cargo but in doing so they affected the centre of gravity of the aircraft and the pilot lost control.

7 June
In the Dominican Republic, Douglas DC-3 N102AP of Victoria Air was written off near Gregorio Luperón International Airport, San Felipe de Puerto Plata, following a double engine failure on approach. The aircraft was on a domestic non-scheduled passenger flight from Arroyo Barril International Airport, Samaná.

25 November
Douglas C-47B C9-STD of Scan Transportes Aéreos crashed into trees while performing a go-around at Sena-Sofala in Mozambique while on a cargo flight from Beira Airport. One crew member was killed.

22 December
In Germany, Douglas DC-3A D-CCCC of Classic Wings crashed at Handschuhsheim, Heidelberg while on a domestic non-scheduled passenger flight that had departed from Frankfurt Airport. Twenty-eight of the thirty-two people on board were killed.

27 December
In Greece, Hellenic Air Force Douglas C-47B KK171 was damaged beyond repair in an accident at Tatoi Air Base, Dekeleia. One of the six crew was killed.

== 1992 ==
21 January
Douglas VC-47D L2-41/15/210 of the Royal Thai Air Force was damaged beyond repair in a landing accident at Don Mueang International Airport in Thailand's capital city Bangkok.

February
In Kenya, Douglas DC-3C 5Y-BBN of Air Kenya was written off at an airstrip in the Masai Mara. The aircraft was scrapped in situ in 1993.

29 February
Douglas DC-3A CP-529 of Frigorifico Santa Rita was destroyed by a fire at Carolita Ranch in Bolivia.

21 July
In Belgium, Douglas DC-3C LX-DKT of Legend Air was damaged beyond repair at Oostende Airport when it was blown into Boeing 707 Z-WKV during a storm. As of 15 June 2008, the aircraft was still at Oostende.

31 August
In Angola, Aero Modifications International (AMI) DC-3-65TP ZS-DHX of Professional Aviation Services crashed on take-off from Jamba Airport, Jamba on an international non-scheduled passenger flight to Wonderboom Airport, Pretoria, South Africa. All three crew were killed, but the seventeen passengers escaped.

2 November
Douglas C-47A CP-1960 of Transportes Aéreos San Jorge crashed short of the runway at San Juan, Bolivia after an engine failed whilst on a test flight.

== 1993 ==
13 January
In Canada, Douglas C-47A C-FAAM of Central Mountain Air Services crashed shortly after take-off from Bronson Creek Airport, British Columbia on a flight to Wrangell Airport, Wrangell, Alaska. Both crew were killed.

18 February
a Douglas DC-3C of Missionary Flights International was hijacked on a flight from Cap-Haitien International Airport, Haiti to Palm Beach County Park Airport, Florida, United States. The hijacker surrendered after the aircraft landed at Miami International Airport.

8 March
Douglas C-47A EC-FAH of ARM crashed on take-off from Palma de Mallorca Airport in Spain on a cargo flight to Madrid-Barajas Airport. Both crew were killed.

20 April
In the United States, Douglas C-47B N8056 of Phoenix Air was written off in a wheels-up landing at Zephyrhills, Florida following an engine failure while engaged in a flight in support of parachuting operations from Zephyrhills Municipal Airport. An investigation by the NTSB found that the aircraft should have been able to climb on one engine. The pilot's type rating for the DC-3 was suspended following the accident with the requirement that he should pass a Federal Aviation Administration proficiency check before it was restored.

In Colombia, Douglas C-47A CP-1622 of Trans Aéreos Cochabamba was damaged beyond repair in an accident at Gustavo Artunduaga Paredes Airport, Florencia. The port engine failed and both crew were killed in the accident.

31 August
Douglas R4D-5 HK-3220 of Transoriente Colombia crashed into Colombia's Río Guaviare and was written off.

7 November
AMI DC-3-65TP ZS-KCV of Professional Aviation Services was damaged beyond repair in a take-off accident at Lokichogio Airport in Kenya.

22 November
Douglas C-47A C9-STE of Scan Transportes Aéreos crashed near Molima, Mozambique while on a cargo flight. Two of the three crew were killed.

== 1994 ==
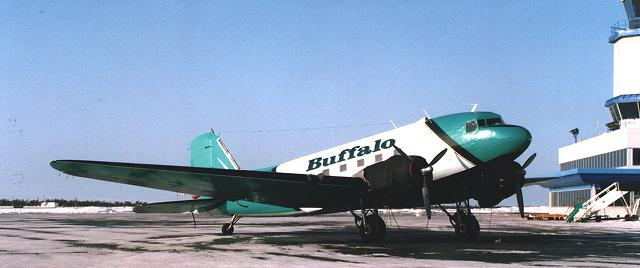
Buffalo Airways DC-3

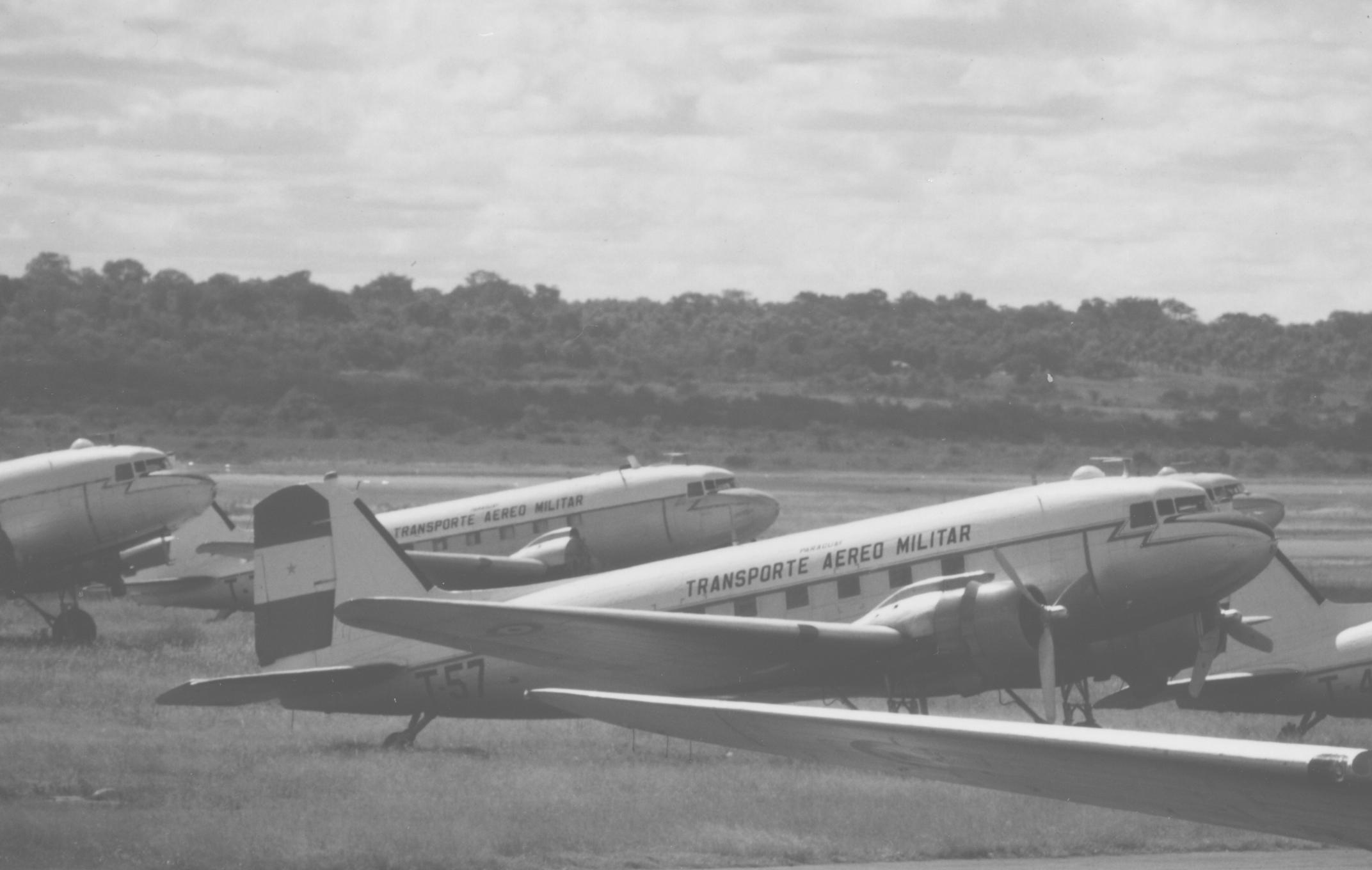
TAM Paraguay C-47s

18 March
Douglas DC-3C N3433Y of Salair crashed shortly after take-off from Spokane International Airport in the United States on a cargo flight to Portland International Airport. The starboard engine failed shortly after take-off. The engine that failed had previously been in long-term storage and had been fitted to the aircraft on 21 February, replacing an engine that developed a misfire and loss of power. It had accumulated 15 hrs flight time at the time of the accident. The aircraft was destroyed in the subsequent fire and both crew were killed.

24 April
In Australia, Douglas DC-3 VH-EDC of South Pacific Airmotive, that had been chartered to carry the cadet pipe band of The Scots College to an Anzac Day ceremony on Norfolk Island, suffered power loss in the left engine on take-off from Sydney Airport and ditched in Botany Bay. All 21 passengers and four crew on board were rescued by private watercraft operating on the bay, with the flight attendant suffering serious injuries; the aircraft was subsequently written-off. Investigators found that the cause was a combination of poor maintenance, an overloaded aircraft and improper handling during the take-off and subsequent emergency.

28 May
In Colombia, Douglas C-53D HK-2213 of Transoriente Colombia crashed near Villavicencio after both engines failed shortly after take-off from La Vanguardia Airport on a scheduled passenger flight. Seven of the twenty-nine people on board were killed.

26 June
In Canada, Douglas C-47A C-FROD of Buffalo Airways crashed on approach to Fort Simpson Airport, Northwest Territories due to fuel exhaustion. The aircraft was on a cargo flight from Trout Lake Airport. There were two crew on board at the time; both were injured and the aircraft was damaged beyond repair.

1 August
Douglas C-47A 6041 of Türk Hava Kuvvetleri was written off in an accident at Eskişehir Airport in Turkey.

26 September
Douglas C-47D FAP2009 of Transportes Aéreo Militar - TAM Paraguay was written off in a take-off accident at Bahia Negra Airport in Paraguay while on a domestic non-scheduled passenger flight to Silvio Pettirossi International Airport, Luque. The pilot was killed when a propeller blade entered the cockpit but the other 28 passengers and crew survived.

24 November
In Paraguay, Douglas C-47B FAP2028 of Transportes Aéreo Militar - TAM Paraguay was damaged beyond repair when it overran the runway on take-off at La Victoria Airport on a cargo flight to Silvio Pettirossi International Airport.

15 December
Basler BT-67 N96BF of SL Aviation Services was damaged beyond repair in a take-off accident at Lobito Airport in Angola when flight was attempted with insufficient airspeed. Both crew were killed.

17 December
On the 59th anniversary of the first flight of the DC-3, Douglas C-47A YV-761-C of Servivensa crashed on approach to Cerro Aicha Airport in Venezuela, killing all nine people on board.

== 1995 ==
12 March
Douglas C-47B C-FDTT of Transfair was written off in a landing accident at Lac Manitou Airport, Quebec, Canada.

25 May
In Colombia, Douglas DC-3C HK-3213 of LACOL Colombia crashed on approach to Miraflores Airport on a flight from La Vanguardia Airport, Villavicencio. The cargo aircraft was carrying eleven passengers, two of whom were killed.

18 July
Douglas C-47A 5R-MMG of the Malagasy Air Force crashed on approach to Maintirano Airport in Madagascar. The aircraft was on a domestic non-scheduled passenger flight from Ivato Airport, Antananarivo. All 36 people on board were killed.

19 July
In the United States, Douglas C-47A N54AN was destroyed in a crash near Independence, New York following an engine failure and the pilot shutting down the wrong engine. The aircraft was on a ferry flight from Elmira Regional Airport to Kansas City Downtown Airport. One of the two crew was killed.

19 August
In Canada, Douglas C-47B C-GZOF of Air North crashed on approach to Vancouver International Airport, Richmond, British Columbia killing one of the three crew. The aircraft was on a ferry flight to Prince Rupert Airport when the starboard propeller went into overspeed and the decision was made to return to Vancouver International.

== 1996 ==
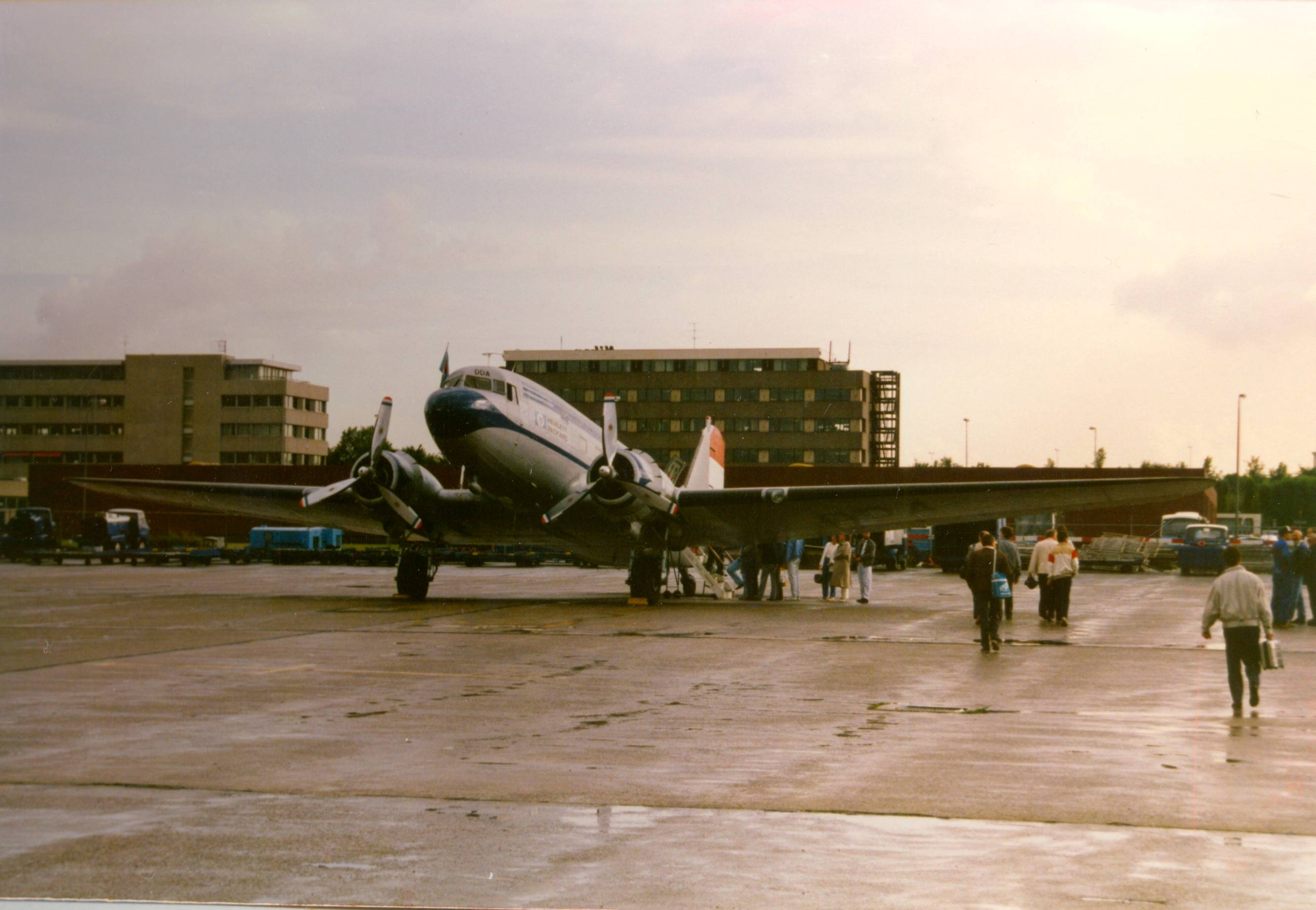
PH-DDA of the Dutch Dakota Association

30 March
In Colombia, Douglas C-47B HK-2497 of LANC Colombia was damaged beyond repair in a wheels-up forced landing in a field near La Vanguardia Airport, Villavicencio. The aircraft was on a domestic scheduled passenger flight to La Macarena Airport when an engine problem was encountered and the decision was made to return to La Vanguardia.

5 May
Douglas DC-3C C-GCZG of Aviation Boreal was damaged beyond repair when the undercarriage collapsed in a landing accident on the frozen surface of Kenty Lake in the Canadian province of Quebec.

20 June
In the United States, Douglas DC-3A N23WT of Loren Davis Ministries International was destroyed in a crash at Cut and Shoot, Texas. The aircraft was on a training flight based at Conroe Airport when an engine failure occurred. The co-pilot did not hear the call to feather the propeller on the affected engine. The aircraft flew into a tree, hit power lines and was destroyed in the subsequent fire. A witness stated that the aircraft was lifted off with insufficient airspeed. The crew also attempted to fly the aircraft at an incorrect airspeed following the engine failure.

25 September
In the Netherlands, Douglas DC-3C PH-DDA of the Dutch Dakota Association crashed on mudflats in the Wadden Sea 8 nautical miles (15 km) north of Den Oever following an engine failure on a domestic non-scheduled passenger flight from Texel International Airport to Amsterdam Airport Schiphol. The propeller failed to feather and created excessive drag. All 32 people on board were killed. Additional factors in the accident were the crew's lack of proficiency in dealing with emergency situations and a lack of a flight simulator to practice handling of emergencies.

31 October
Douglas DC-3C N37AP of Flamenco Airways crashed at San Juan, Puerto Rico. The aircraft was on a cargo flight from Isla Grande Airport to Luis Muñoz Marín International Airport when a problem developed with the starboard engine. The propeller feathering system was known to be inoperative, although this was not recorded in maintenance logs. The increased drag from the unfeathered propeller was such that it overcame the power available from the functioning engine.

9 December
In the United States, Douglas C-47A N75142 of Emery Worldwide crashed on approach to Boise Airport killing both crew. The aircraft was on a cargo flight to Salt Lake City International Airport when the starboard engine caught fire shortly after take-off and the decision was made to return to Boise.

== 1997 ==
15 March
In the United States, Basler BT-67 TZ-389 of the Force Aérienne de la République du Mali crashed at Newton, Wisconsin after being involved in a mid-air collision with Beechcraft A36 Bonanza N3657A. The aircraft was on a ferry flight from Wittman Regional Airport Oshkosh to Manitowoc County Airport and the Bonanza was engaged in aerial photography. Both crew on board the BT-67 were killed, as were all four people on board the Bonanza.

15 April
In the Democratic Republic of the Congo, a Douglas DC-3 was hijacked at N'djili Airport, Kinshasa. There were six to eight hijackers.

7 November
In the United States, Douglas C-47A N59316 of McNeeley Charter was damaged beyond repair at West Memphis, Arkansas when a wheels-up landing was made on a sandbank in the Mississippi River. The aircraft was on a ferry flight from Gulfport-Biloxi International Airport to West Memphis Municipal Airport when both engines failed due to fuel exhaustion.

20 December
Douglas C-47 XA-CUC of Aerolíneas California Pacífico crashed near Guerrero Negro in Mexico on a flight from Guerrero Negro Airport to Isla de Cedros Airport, Cedros, Baja California.

== 1998 ==
2 February
In the United States, Douglas C-117D N505C was damaged beyond repair by a tornado at Opa-locka Airport, Florida.

3 February
Douglas C-47A N200MF of Missionary Flights International crashed on approach to George Town Airport in the Bahamas. The aircraft was on a passenger flight from Cap-Haitien International Airport, Haiti when an engine failed shortly after take-off. The crew decided to return to George Town but the second engine failed on approach. All 26 on board survived.

24 May
In the United States, Douglas C-47A N67588 of Majestic Air Cargo was damaged beyond repair in a landing accident at Point MacKenzie, Alaska following fuel exhaustion on a ferry flight from Unalakleet Airport to Anchorage International Airport.

24 August
AMI DC-3-65TP ZS-NKK of Speed Service Couriers crashed on take-off from Wonderboom Airport, Pretoria, South Africa. The aircraft had been in maintenance and the elevator trim had been left in the full nose-up position. The pilot failed to carry out pre-flight checks and did not notice the position of the trim tab. One of the two crew was killed. The aircraft was on a mail flight to Durban International Airport.

2 October
Douglas DC-3C YV-611C of Servivensa crashed on approach to Canaima Airport in Venezuela. The aircraft had been on a local sightseeing flight to view the Angel Falls. One of the 25 people on board was killed.

1 November
Douglas C-47A N3FY of Living Water Teaching Ministries crashed into a mountain near Quetzaltenango, Guatemala on a domestic non-scheduled passenger flight from Playa Grande Airport to Quetzaltenango Airport. Eleven of the eighteen people on board were killed.

== 1999 ==
13 January
In Canada, Douglas DC-3C C-GWUG of Kelowna Flightcraft Air Charter crashed into Mount Parke, Mayne Island while on a domestic cargo flight from Vancouver International Airport to Victoria International Airport. Investigation revealed that the flight was being operated under Visual Flight Rules at night, in contravention of Canadian Aviation Regulations.

18 March
Douglas DC-3C HK-337 of Aliansa crashed 10 kilometres (5.4 nmi) from Tame in Colombia on a domestic non-scheduled passenger flight from Camilo Daza International Airport to El Alcaraván Airport, Yopal. All eight people on board were killed.

30 August
In the Philippines, Douglas C-117D RP-C473 of Mabuhay Airlines crashed into power lines at Santa Rosa while on a ferry flight from Fernando Air Base, Lipa City to Ninoy Aquino International Airport, Manila. All nine people on board survived.

10 November
In Colombia, Douglas DC-3C HK-2581 of Aliansa crashed at La Montañita while on an international cargo flight from Putumayo Airport, Puerto El Carmen de Putumayo, Ecuador to La Vanguardia Airport, Villavicencio. All five people on board were killed. The aircraft had probably been struck by a surface-to-air missile.

== See also ==
- List of accidents and incidents involving the DC-3 in the 1930s
- List of accidents and incidents involving the DC-3 in the 1940s
- List of accidents and incidents involving the DC-3 in the 1950s
- List of accidents and incidents involving the DC-3 in the 1960s
- List of accidents and incidents involving the DC-3 in the 1970s
- List of accidents and incidents involving the DC-3 in the 1980s
- List of accidents and incidents involving the DC-3 since 2000

== Notes ==
^Note A Military versions of the DC-3 were known as C-47 Skytrain, C-48, C-49, C-50, C-51, C-52, C-53 Skytrooper, C-68, C-84, C-117 Super Dakota and YC-129 by the United States Army Air Forces and as the R4D by the United States Navy. In Royal Air Force (and other British Commonwealth air forces') service, these aircraft were known as Dakotas. A number of DC-3s have been rebuilt with turboprop engines and have a variety of designations. The Basler BT-67 is probably the best known of these; others include the DC-3-65/AR and the AMI DC-3-65TP.
