= PHN (disambiguation) =

PHN is an acronym used for postherpetic neuralgia, a neuropathic pain.

PHN may also refer to:

- North Philadelphia station (Amtrak station code)
- Philippine highway network
- Phoenician language (ISO 639-2 and ISO 639-3 codes)
- Spanish National Water Plan (Plan Hidrológico Nacional); see Water supply and sanitation in Spain
- Public Health Nurse
- St. Clair County International Airport (IATA and FAA LID codes)
- p-Hydroxynorephedrine, an analog of norephedrine
