= 1999 La Montañita Dc-3 Crash =

Aviation incident in Colombia

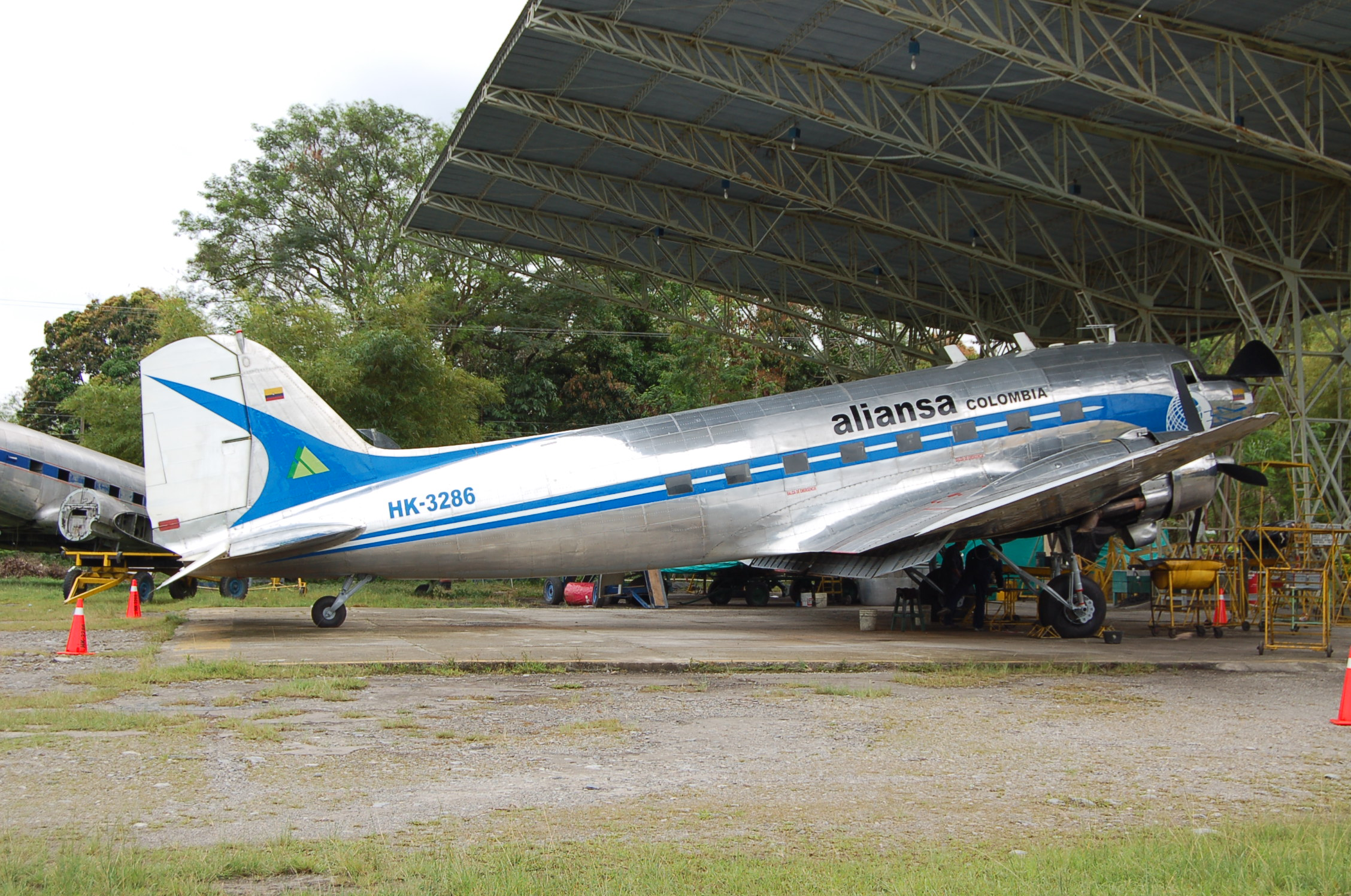

Accident
- Date: 10th November 1999
- Summary: Broke up during flight
- Site: La Montañita

Aircraft
- Aircraft type: Douglas DC-3
- Operator: Aliansa
- Registration: HK-2581
- Flight origin: Putumayo Airport
- Destination: La Vanguardia Airport
- Occupants: 5
- Fatalities: 5
- Survivors: 0

On the 10th of November 1999, An Aliansa Douglas DC-3C (HK-2581) crashed on a flight between Putumayo Airport and La Vanguardia Airport.

== Accident ==
On 10 November 1999, an ALIANSA Colombia Douglas DC-3C, registered HK-2581, was operating a cargo flight from Putumayo Airport to La Vanguardia Airport in Villavicencio, Colombia. The aircraft departed Putumayo at approximately 06:40 local time.

During the flight, the crew reported their position while climbing through 7,500 feet toward an assigned altitude of 11,500 feet. The final radio transmission was made at about 07:20, when the aircraft was reported to be passing the VOR near Florencia, Caquetá, at 11,500 feet. The crew subsequently failed to make the expected radio report, and the aircraft was reported missing.

The aircraft was later located in the vicinity of La Montañita, Caquetá. The wreckage was distributed over approximately 7.2 km across an area of tropical savanna, indicating that the aircraft had broken apart while airborne. The investigation concluded that the aircraft had suffered a high-altitude in-flight breakup and was destroyed. All five people aboard were killed.

The accident was investigated by Aerocivil. Investigators considered several possible scenarios but found insufficient evidence to establish a definitive cause. Weather was regarded as the possibility most consistent with the available circumstances, but the investigation found no conclusive evidence linking weather conditions to the breakup. The official cause was therefore classified as “undetermined”.
