= Nondalton Airport =

Airport in Alaska, United States

- IATA: NNL; ICAO: PANO; FAA LID: 5NN

Summary
- Airport type: Public
- Owner: Alaska DOT&PF - Southcoast Region
- Serves: Nondalton, Alaska
- Elevation AMSL: 314 ft (96 m)
- Coordinates: 59°58′49″N 154°50′21″W

Map
- Location of airport in Alaska

Runways
Direction	Length		Surface
Direction	ft	m	Surface
2/20	2,800	853	Gravel

Statistics (2008)
- Aircraft operations: 1,250
- Enplanements: 825
- Sources: Federal Aviation Administration

Nondalton Airport (IATA: NNL, ICAO: PANO, FAA LID: 5NN) is a state-owned public-use airport located one nautical mile (1.85 km) northwest of Nondalton, in the Lake and Peninsula Borough of the U.S. state of Alaska.

As per Federal Aviation Administration records, the airport had 825 passenger boardings (enplanements) in calendar year 2008, a decrease of 50.9% from the 1,679 enplanements in 2007. This airport is included in the FAA's National Plan of Integrated Airport Systems for 2009–2013, which categorizes it as a general aviation facility.

== Facilities and aircraft ==
Nondalton Airport covers an area of 114 acres (46 ha) at an elevation of 314 feet (96 m) above mean sea level. It has one runway designated 2/20 with a gravel surface measuring 2,800 by 75 feet (853 x 23 m). For the 12-month period ending December 31, 2008, the airport had 1,250 aircraft operations, an average of 104 per month: 60% general aviation and 40% air taxi.

== Airlines and destinations ==
Airlines	Destinations
Iliamna Air Taxi	Iliamna, Port Alsworth

== See also ==
- List of airports in Alaska
