= Paruima =

- Village
- Location in Guyana
- Coordinates: 5.8065°N 61.0632°W
- Country: Guyana
- Region: Cuyuni-Mazaruni

Government
  - Toshao: Lee Williams

Population (2012)
  - Total: 207

Paruima is an Indigenous village of Pemon Amerindians in the Cuyuni-Mazaruni Region of Guyana. The village was founded as a mission of the Seventh-day Adventist Church. It is the only Pemon speaking community in Guyana.

== Overview ==
Reverend A.W. Cott of the Seventh-day Adventist Church was a missionary among the Pemon people in Venezuela. In 1930, Cott was expelled from Venezuela, and decided to settle in Paruima in Guyana together with his fellow missionaries, and Amerindian converts.

Paruima has a primary school, and a health centre. In 2017, the school was destroyed when the river flooded. It has been rebuilt in 2019. It is also home to the Paruima Mission Academy, a college for missionaries. The main access is by air via the Paruima Airport.

The toshao (village chief) as of 2018 is Lee Williams. Williams first ran for toshao in 1997 at the age of 19. Twenty one years later, he was elected as the toshao and remained in office until 2021 when a new toshao was elected. Every three years new elections are held, Lennox Percy, who was the vice under Lee Williams is currently serving his second term in office as the toshao of Paruima, new elections are set for May, 2024. In 2020, Williams was also elected to the National Assembly.

== Nature ==
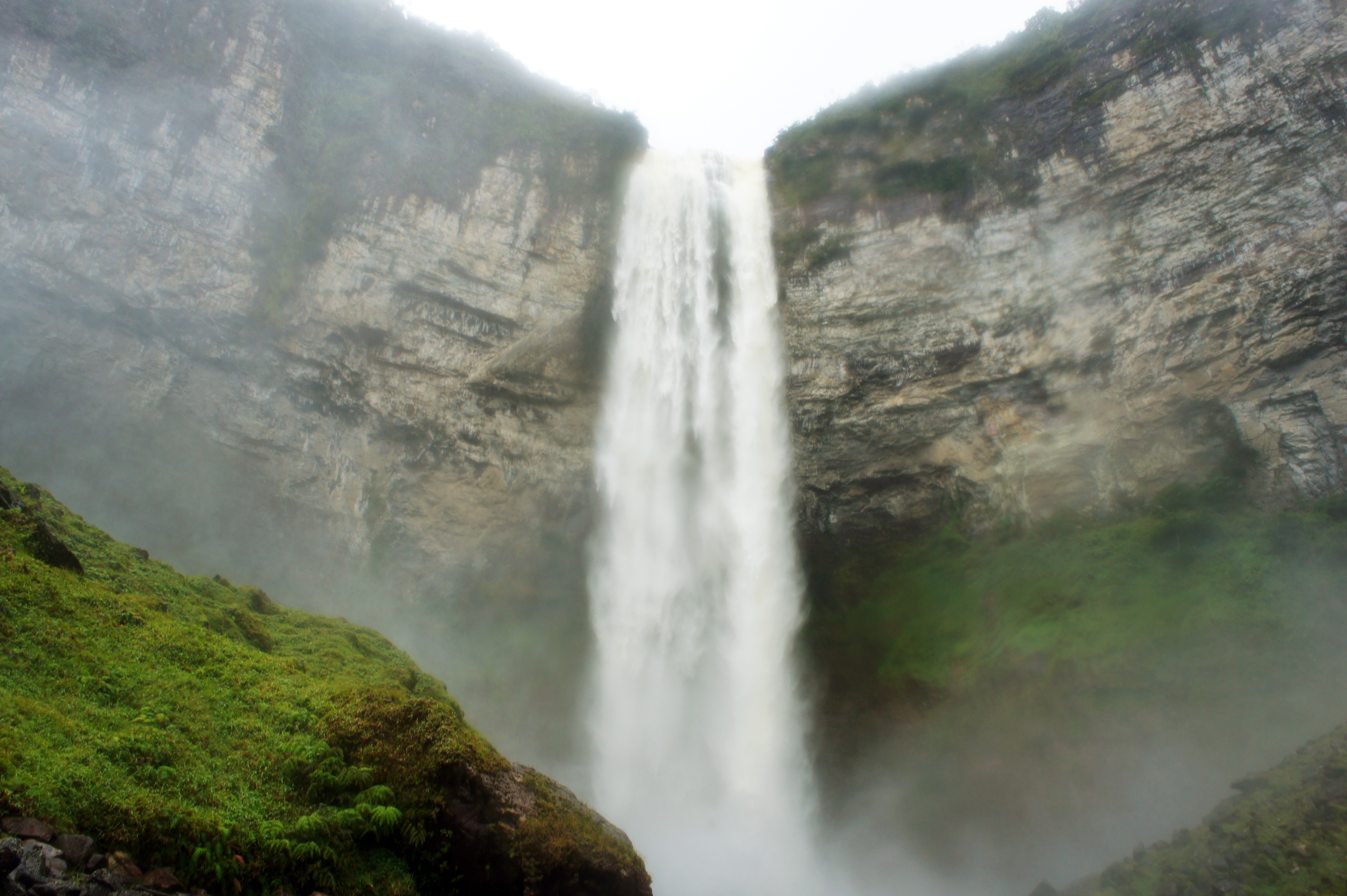
Oshi Falls

The Oshi Falls are located near the village. The Oshi Falls are one of the tallest waterfalls of Guyana. A permit from the Office of Indigenous Affairs is required to visit the falls.

In January 2021, a new species of orchid from the tepuis in the Guiana Highlands was identified and described by Eric Hágsater, a Mexican botanist, and Mateusz Wrazidlo, a Silesian explorer. Wrazidlo asked the family of Calio Elliman, his guide from Paruima, to name the plant. Elliman opted for "katarun yariku" (Pemon for "high flower"). The orchid has been officially named Epidendrum katarun-yariku.
