= PBV =

PBV may refer to:

== Transportation and vehicles ==
- St. George Airport (Alaska) (FAA airport code: PBV), St. George, St. George Island, Aleutians West, Aleutian Islands, Alaska, USA
- Porto dos Gaúchos Airport (IATA airport code: PBV); see List of airports by IATA airport code: P
- Pbv, a prefix code for armored combat vehicles; see List of modern armoured fighting vehicles
- PBV, a model prefix used by Canadian Vickers
- post-boost vehicle, a component of a ballistic missile
- Purpose-Built Vehicle

== Groups, companies, and, organizations ==
- Peace Boat Disaster Relief Volunteer Centre (PBV)
- Pacific Baseball Ventures (PBV), the organization for creating the baseball team Yakima Valley Pippins
- Publishing and Broadcasting Video (PBV), former name of Communications and Entertainment Limited

== Voting systems ==
- Party block voting (also known as the 'general ticket')
- Preferential block voting

== Other uses ==
- Pnar language (ISO 639 language code: pbv)
- price-to-book-value ratio (P/BV), a type of financial ratio

== See also ==
- Canadian Vickers PBV-1 Canso flying boat
- CYTH2 (aka 1PBV), the cytohesin-2 gene
