= Pedro Bay Airport =

- IATA: PDB; ICAO: none; FAA LID: 4K0

Summary
- Airport type: Public
- Owner: State of Alaska DOT&PF - Central Region
- Serves: Pedro Bay, Alaska
- Elevation AMSL: 45 ft / 14 m
- Coordinates: 59°47′50″N 154°07′49″W

Map
- Location of airport in Alaska

Runways
Direction	Length		Surface
Direction	ft	m	Surface
9/27	3,000	914	Gravel

Statistics (2008)
- Aircraft operations: 1,050
- Source: Federal Aviation Administration

Pedro Bay Airport (IATA: PDB, FAA LID: 4K0) is a state-owned public-use airport located one nautical mile (1.85 km) west of the central business district of Pedro Bay, in the Lake and Peninsula Borough of the U.S. state of Alaska.

As per Federal Aviation Administration records, the airport had 678 passenger boardings (enplanements) in calendar year 2008, a decrease of 47% from the 1,271 enplanements in 2007. This airport is included in the FAA's National Plan of Integrated Airport Systems for 2009–2013, which categorized it as a general aviation facility.

== Facilities and aircraft ==
Pedro Bay Airport covers an area of 229 acres (93 ha) at an elevation of 45 feet (14 m) above mean sea level. It has one runway designated 9/27 with a gravel surface measuring 3,000 by 60 feet (914 x 18 m). For the 12-month period ending December 31, 2008, the airport had 1,050 aircraft operations, an average of 87 per month: 52% general aviation and 48% air taxi.

== Airlines and destinations ==
Airlines	Destinations
Iliamna Air Taxi	Iliamna, Kokhanok

== See also ==
- List of airports in Alaska
