= George Town Airport =

Airport near George Town, The Bahamas

- IATA: none; ICAO: MYEG

Summary
- Airport type: Public
- Serves: Great Exuma, Bahamas
- Location: George Town
- Elevation AMSL: 5 ft / 2 m
- Coordinates: 23°28′00″N 075°46′54″W

Map
- Location in The Bahamas

Runways
Direction	Length		Surface
Direction	ft	m	Surface
11/29		1,524	Asphalt
- Source: DAFIF

George Town Airport (ICAO: MYEG) is an abandoned airport located near George Town on the island of Great Exuma in The Bahamas which is closed for civilian use.

== Facilities ==
The closed airport, located at the end of "Old Airport Road" on Great Exuma Island, resides at an elevation of 5 ft (1.5 m) above mean sea level. It had one runway designated 11/29 with an asphalt surface measuring 1,524 m × 27 m (5,000 ft × 89 ft).

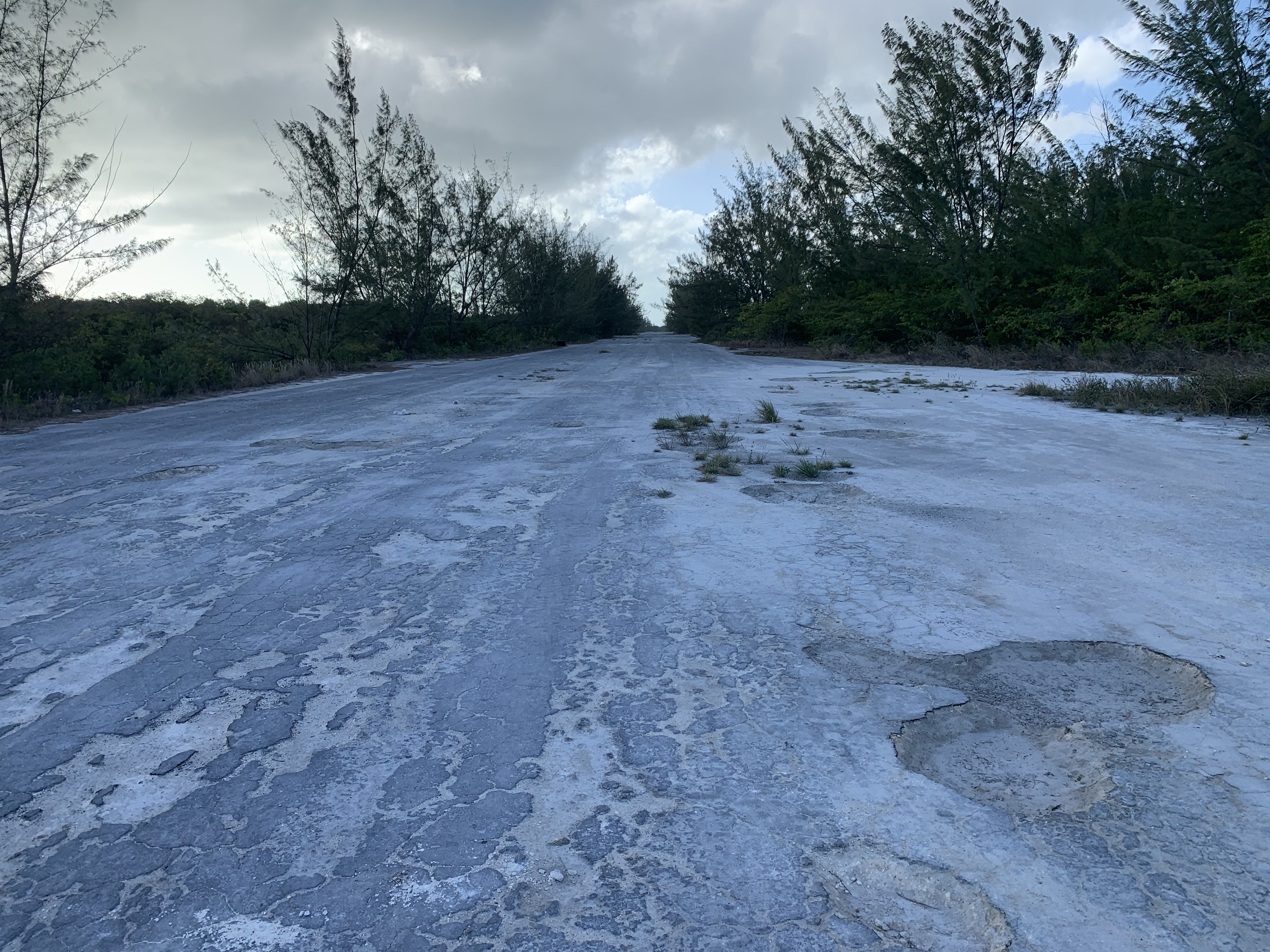
MYEG (George Town, Exuma) Airport Runway as of Feb 28, 2021

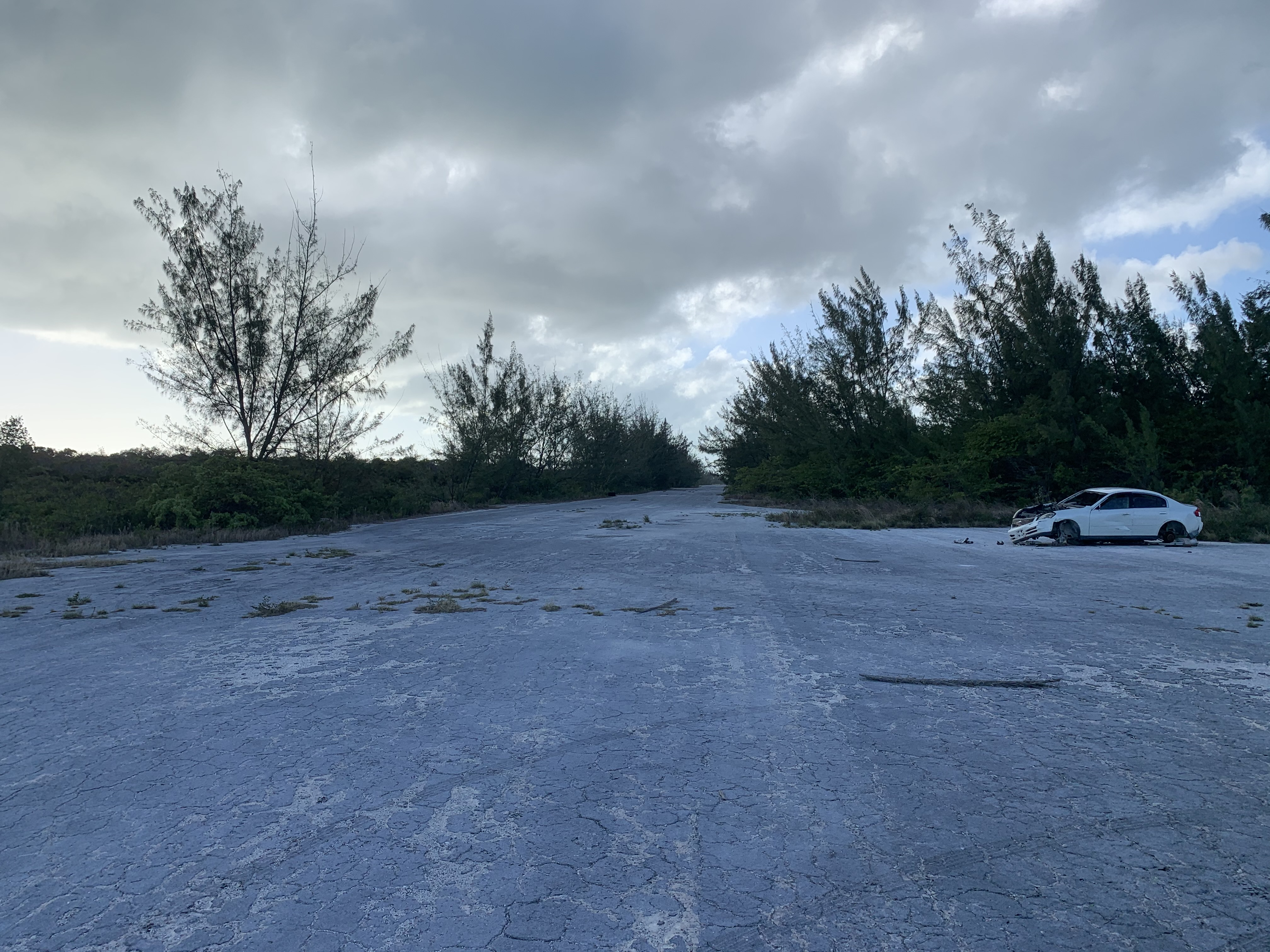
MYEG (George Town, Exuma) Airport Runway & Ramp as of Feb 28, 2021

== Accidents and incidents ==
- On 3 February 1998, Douglas C-47A N200MF of Missionary Flights International crashed on approach to George Town Airport. The aircraft was on a passenger flight from Cap-Haitien International Airport, Haiti when an engine failed shortly after take-off. The crew decided to return to George Town but the second engine failed on approach. All 26 on board survived.

== See also ==
- Exuma International Airport (IATA: GGT, ICAO: MYEF), located near Moss Town.
