= Miraflores Airport =

- IATA: MFS; ICAO: SKMF

Summary
- Airport type: Public
- Serves: Miraflores, Colombia
- Elevation AMSL: 700 ft / 213 m
- Coordinates: 1°20′10″N 71°57′10″W

Map
- Location of the airport in Colombia

Runways
Direction	Length		Surface
Direction	m	ft	Surface
02/20	1,250	4,101	Dirt
- Sources: GCM Google Maps

Miraflores Airport (IATA: MFS, ICAO: SKMF) is an airport serving the town of Miraflores, in the Guaviare Department of Colombia. The runway and town are on the east bank of the Vaupés River, a tributary of the Rio Negro River.

== See also ==
- Transport in Colombia
- List of airports in Colombia
