= Iliamna Airport =

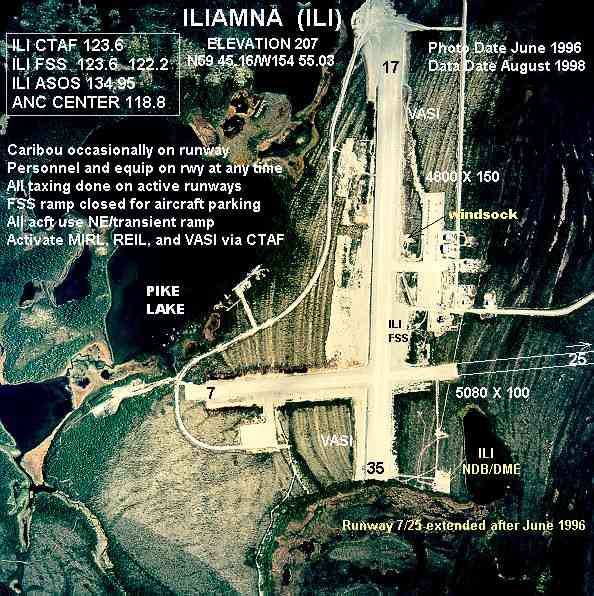
- IATA: ILI; ICAO: PAIL; FAA LID: ILI

Summary
- Airport type: Public
- Owner: Alaska DOT&PF - Southcoast Region
- Serves: Iliamna, Alaska
- Elevation AMSL: 192 ft (59 m)
- Coordinates: 59°45′14″N 154°54′39″W

Map
- Location of airport in Alaska

Runways
Direction	Length		Surface
Direction	ft	m	Surface
7/25	5,086	1,550	Asphalt
17/35	4,800	1,463	Asphalt
E/W	2,998	914	Water
N/S	2,892	881	Water

Statistics (2004)
- Aircraft operations: 15,400
- Based aircraft: 18
- Source: Federal Aviation Administration

Iliamna Airport (IATA: ILI, ICAO: PAIL, FAA LID: ILI) is a state-owned public-use airport located three nautical miles (5.5 km) west of Iliamna, in the Lake and Peninsula Borough of the U.S. state of Alaska.

== Facilities ==
Iliamna Airport has two asphalt paved runways: 7/25 is 5,087 by 100 feet (1,551 x 30 m) and 17/35 is 4,800 by 100 feet (1,463 x 30 m). It also has two seaplane landing areas: Runway E/W measures 2,998 x 400 ft. (914 x 122 m) and Runway N/S measures 2,892 x 400 ft. (881 x 122 m).

For the 12-month period ending December 31, 2004, the airport had 15,400 aircraft operations, an average of 42 per day: 73% general aviation and 27% air taxi. There are 18 aircraft based at this airport: 89% single engine and 11% multi-engine.

== Airlines and destinations ==
Airlines	Destinations
Iliamna Air Taxi	Anchorage, Kokhanok, Nondalton, Pedro Bay, Port Alsworth

== See also ==
- List of airports in Alaska
