= King George VI Falls =

- Salto Oshi
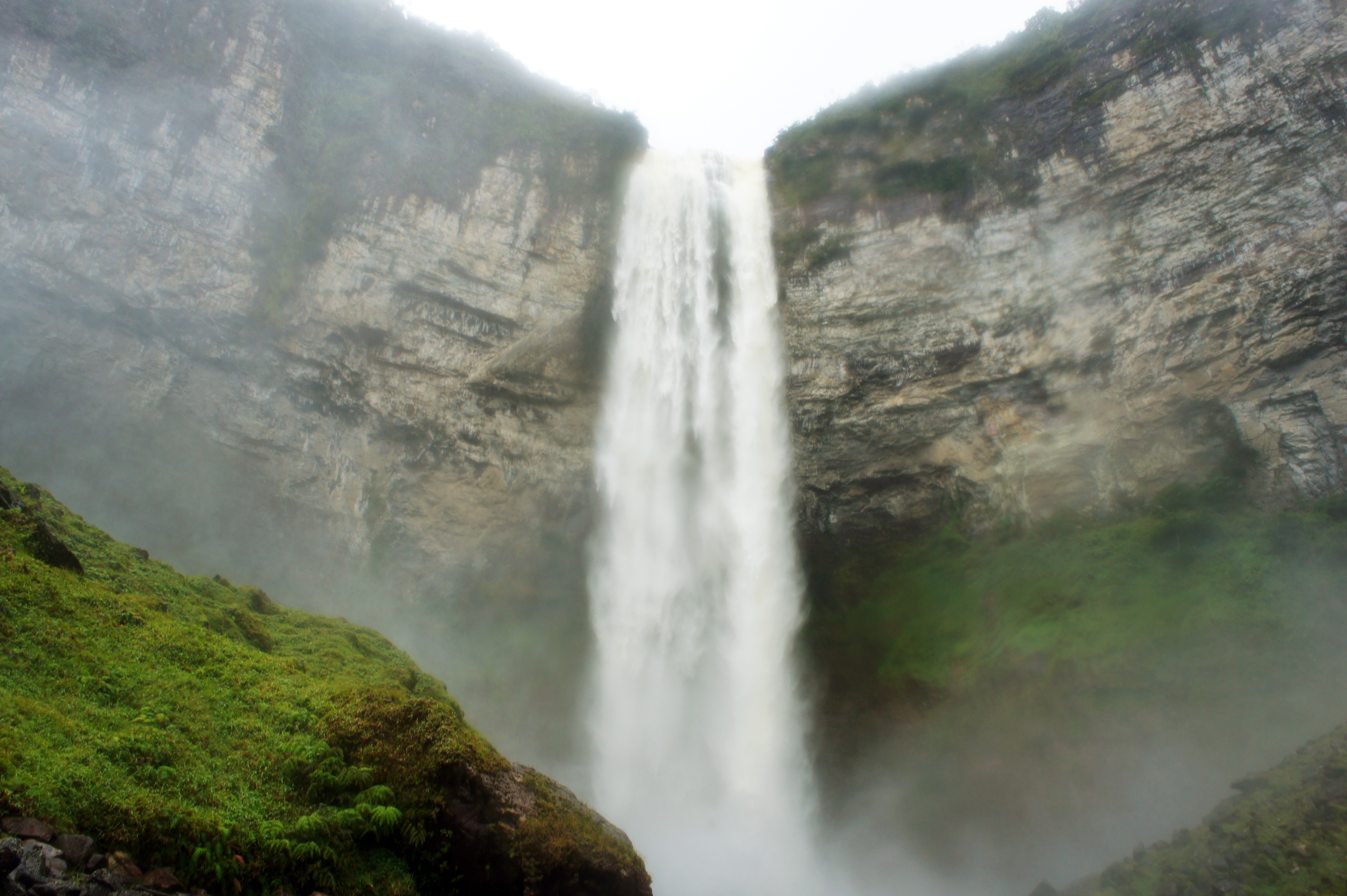
- King George VI Falls on January 17, 2012

- Location within Guyana
- Location: Cuyuni-Mazaruni region, Guyana
- Coordinates: 5°41′18″N 61°06′44″W
- Total height: 214 metres (702 ft)
- Watercourse: Oshi River

King George VI Falls, also known as Salto Oshi or Oshi Falls, is located on the Oshi River in the Cuyuni-Mazaruni region of Guyana.

This waterfall is rarely visited. The exact height waterfall used to be unknown, but was measured in 2014 at 214 metres (702 ft) Though it is not as tall as it has long been thought to be, it is notable for its combination of height and great volume of water, along with its being a sheer plunge. The overhanging cliff gives a visual illusion of a much bigger fall.

The first westerner to see the falls was reportedly American entomologist and physician Paul A. Zahl in 1938. Height of this waterfall has often been reported to be 1,600 feet, and that figure has been published many times over several decades, but it is greatly exaggerated. The error originated from imprecise measurements of Paul A. Zahl who estimated the height of falls by throwing large rocks and counting seconds until the stones fell down.

The waterfalls are near the indigenous village of Paruima. A permit from the Office of Indigenous Affairs is required to visit the falls.
