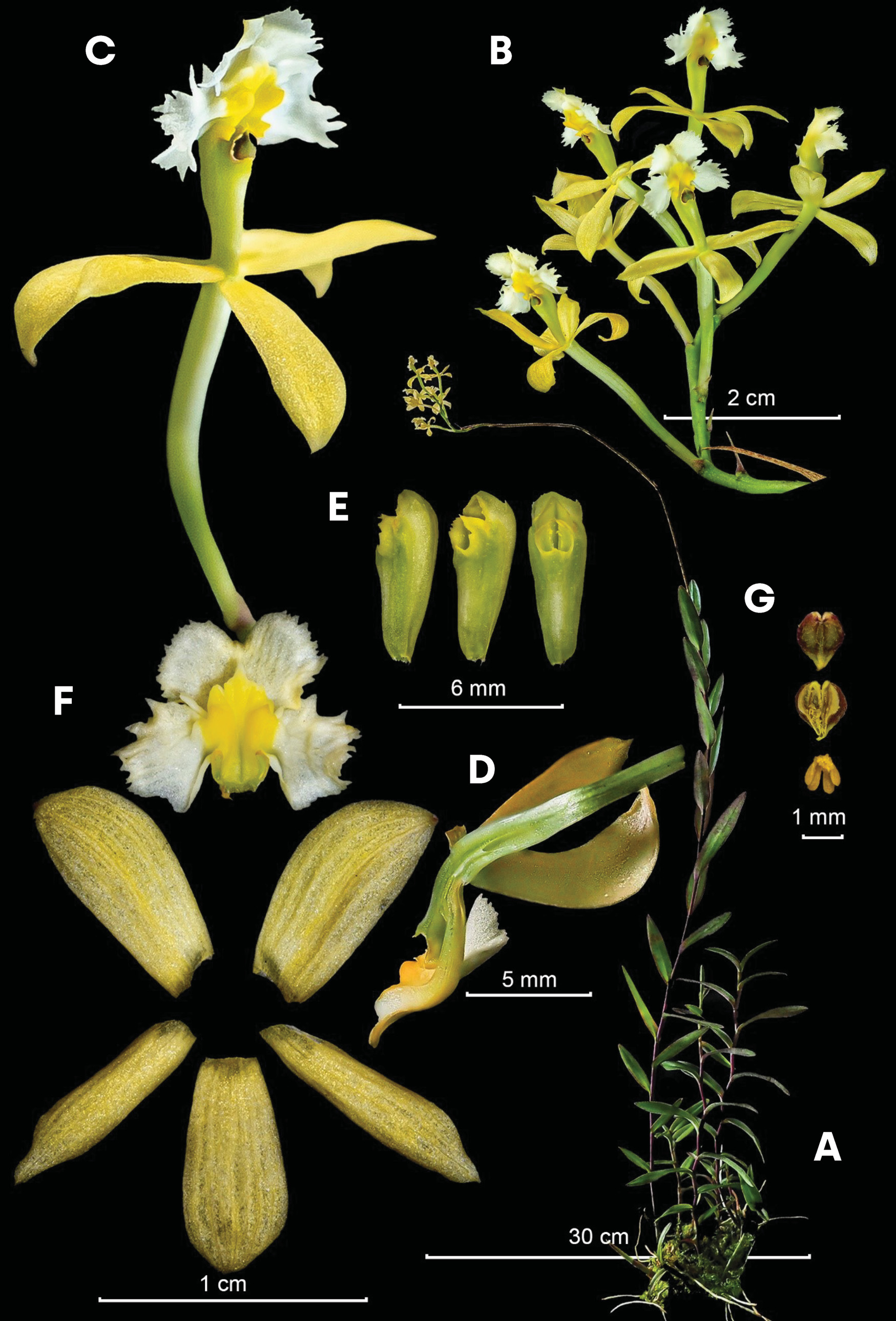
- A. Habit. B. Inflorescence. C. Flower, frontal view. D. Flower, longitudinal section. E. Column. F. Dissected perianth. G. Anther and pollinia

Scientific classification
- Kingdom: Plantae
- Clade: Tracheophytes
- Clade: Angiosperms
- Clade: Monocots
- Order: Asparagales
- Family: Orchidaceae
- Subfamily: Epidendroideae
- Genus: Epidendrum
- Species: E. katarun-yariku

Binomial name
- Epidendrum katarun-yariku Hágsater & Wrazidlo, 2020

= Epidendrum katarun-yariku =

Species of orchid

Epidendrum katarun-yariku is a species of orchid in the genus Epidendrum found in the Guiana Highlands in Venezuela and Brazil. It grows on tepuis.

In the Arekuna language, katarun means high and yariku means flower. The specific epithet was chosen because the species occurs on the peaks and upper foothills of tepuis.
