= Port Harcourt NAF Base =

Port Harcourt Air Force Base
- IATA: PHG; ICAO: DNPM

Summary
- Airport type: Military
- Owner/Operator: Nigerian Air Force
- Serves: Port Harcourt, Nigeria
- Coordinates: 04°50′35″N 07°01′00″E

Map
- Location of Airport in Nigeria

Port Harcourt Air Force Base is located in Rumuomasi, a city in the Rivers State of Nigeria. It is a base owned by the Nigerian Air Force. It gained popularity as a commercial destination due to the temporary closure of Port Harcourt International Airport for repairs. After that airport reopened, most airlines abandoned the base. However, it still has some destinations since the airport is closer to the center than the main airport. It hosts and houses two schools (Air Force Secondary School), and (Air Force Primary School). It is an essential centre for both domestic and military flight service in the state and country at large.

An MI-35P helicopter crashed at the base shortly after take off on 1 December 2023, leaving all five crew members with minor injuries.

A new runway was constructed at the base and opened in August 2026.
