= Kokhanok Airport =

Airport in Alaska, United States

- IATA: KNK; ICAO: PFKK; FAA LID: 9K2

Summary
- Airport type: Public
- Owner: State of Alaska DOT&PF
- Serves: Kokhanok, Alaska
- Elevation AMSL: 115 ft (35 m)
- Coordinates: 59°25′59″N 154°48′09″W

Map
- Location of airport in Alaska

Runways
Direction	Length		Surface
Direction	ft	m	Surface
6/24	3,300	1,006	Gravel

Statistics
- Enplanements (2008): 1,166
- Sources: Federal Aviation Administration

Kokhanok Airport (IATA: KNK, ICAO: PFKK, FAA LID: 9K2) is a state-owned public-use airport located two nautical miles (3.7 km) southwest of the central business district of Kokhanok, in the Lake and Peninsula Borough of the U.S. state of Alaska.

As per Federal Aviation Administration records, the airport had 1,166 passenger boardings (enplanements) in calendar year 2008, a decrease of 33.9% from the 1,765 enplanements in 2007. This airport is included in the FAA's National Plan of Integrated Airport Systems for 2009–2013, which categorizes it as a general aviation facility.

== Facilities ==
Kokhanok Airport covers an area of 111 acres (45 ha) at an elevation of 115 feet (35 m) above mean sea level. It has one runway designated 6/24 with a gravel surface measuring 3,300 by 75 feet (1,006 x 23 m).

== Airlines and destinations ==
Airlines	Destinations
Iliamna Air Taxi	Iliamna

== See also ==
- List of airports in Alaska
