= Ponta do Ouro Airport =

- IATA: PDD; ICAO: FQPO

Summary
- Airport type: Public
- Serves: Ponta do Ouro
- Elevation AMSL: 92 ft / 28 m
- Coordinates: 26°49′36″S 32°50′18″E

Map
- Location of the airport in Mozambique

Runways
Direction	Length		Surface
Direction	ft	m	Surface
02/20	2,460	750	Paved
11/29	2,460	750	Paved

Ponta Do Ouro Airport (IATA: PDD, ICAO: FQPO) is an airport serving Ponta Do Ouro, Maputo Province, Mozambique.

== See also ==
- Transport in Mozambique
