= Punta Chivato Airstrip =

- IATA: PCV; ICAO: none; LID: PCH

Summary
- Airport type: Private
- Operator: N/A
- Location: Punta Chivato, Baja California Sur
- Elevation AMSL: 15 ft / 5 m
- Coordinates: 27°04′29″N 111°58′23″W
- Interactive map of Punta Chivato Airstrip

Runways
Direction	Length		Surface
Direction	ft	m	Surface
13/31	4,088 (appx.)	1,246	Dirt

Punta Chivato Airstrip (IATA: PCV) is a private airstrip in Punta Chivato, Baja California Sur, Mexico. It has two unpaved airstrips, one 1280 meters long and 34 meters wide, and the other 1000 meters long and 24 meters wide. It also has a small aviation platform at the intersection of the two strips. It only operates general aviation and has a license to operate from the Federal Agency of Civil Aviation until 2030.

== Accidents and incidents ==
- On June 22, 1974, a Cessna 337 Skymaster registered as N2127X flying a route from the Mulege Airstrip to Punta Chivato Airstrip crashed while it was approaching the airstrip, killing 4 passengers.
- On November 3, 2008, a Beechcraft 200 Super King Air aircraft with registration N200JL crashed shortly after taking off from the Punta Chivato Airport, catching fire and killing the pilot who was heading to the Bahía de Tortugas Aerodrome.
