= Pauk Airport =

Airport in Myanmar

Coordinates: 21.449°N 94.487°E

Pauk Airport (IATA: PAU, ICAO: VYPK) is an airport located in Myanmar near Pauk.
