= Punta Colorada Airstrip =

- IATA: PCO; ICAO: MMPL; LID: PCL

Summary
- Airport type: Public
- Operator: N/A
- Serves: La Ribera
- Location: Los Cabos Municipality, Baja California Sur state, Mexico
- Elevation AMSL: 55 ft (17 m)
- Coordinates: 23°34′30″N 109°32′09″W
- Interactive map of Punta Colorada Airstrip

Runways
Direction	Length		Surface
Direction	ft	m	Surface
01/19	2,282	695	Soil

Punta Colorada Airstrip (IATA: PCO, ICAO: MMPL) is a privately owned public-use dirt airstrip located south of the town of La Ribera, Municipality of Los Cabos, Baja California Sur, Mexico.

It is located in the Punta Colorada area of the East Cape area on the Gulf of California coast.

It is used solely for general aviation purposes.
