= Paruima Airport =

Airport in Guyana

- IATA: PRR; ICAO: SYPR

Summary
- Serves: Paruima
- Elevation AMSL: 1,765 ft / 538 m
- Coordinates: 5°49′00″N 61°03′20″W

Map
- Location in Guyana

Runways
Direction	Length		Surface
Direction	m	ft	Surface
08/26	550	1,804
- Sources: Google Maps GCM

Paruima Airport (IATA: PRR, ICAO: SYPR) is an airport serving the community of Paruima in the Cuyuni-Mazaruni Region of Guyana.

== See also ==
- List of airports in Guyana
- Transport in Guyana
