= Port Harcourt City Airport =

Port Harcourt NAF Base Port Harcourt City Airport
- IATA: PHG; ICAO: DNPM

Summary
- Airport type: Military
- Serves: Port Harcourt NAF Base
- Elevation AMSL: 48 ft / 15 m
- Coordinates: 4°50′45″N 7°01′15″E

Map
- Location of the airport in Nigeria

Runways
| Direction | Length | | Surface |
| Direction | m | ft | Surface |
|---|---|---|---|
| 04/22 | 2,110 | 6,923 | Asphalt |
- Source: Google Maps GCM

Port Harcourt City Airport (IATA: PHG) is a military airport serving Port Harcourt NAF Base and various other aviation companies in Nigeria.

The Port Harcourt non-directional beacon (Ident: PH) is located on the field.

== See also ==
- Transport in Nigeria
- List of airports in Nigeria
