= Pamol =

Village in Gujarat, India

Coordinates: 22.445°N 72.942°E

Pamol is a small village in Borsad taluka of Anand district in the Indian state of Gujarat. It is located around 6 km north east from Borsad. It is surrounded by the fertile Charotar region which largely produces tobacco, Bananas, rice, cotton, lady finger, tomato, potato, and other agricultural crops. Patel owns the majority of business which is basically farming and farming products. Other major communities are Thakor, Brahmins, Chavda, Vankars, Maheshwari, Muslims and Christians.

== Location and climate ==
Pamol village is located at 22.444955 N, 72.942397 E. There are 3 main seasons, Winter, Summer and Monsoon. Aside from the monsoon season, the climate is dry. The weather is hot through the months of March to July — the average summer maximum is 36 °C (97 °F), and the average minimum is 23 °C (73 °F). From November to February, the average maximum temperature is 30 °C (85 °F), the average minimum is 15 °C (59 °F), and the climate is extremely dry. Cold northerly winds are responsible for a mild chill in January. The southwest monsoon brings a humid climate from mid-June to mid-September. The average rainfall is 93 cm (36.7 inches), but infrequent heavy torrential rains cause the river to flood.

== Education ==
There are two major schools available in the village: Government Primary School, Pamol and S D Patel Fulbai Vidya Mandir high school, Pamol. The education from Nursery and Class 1 to Class 10 are provided in these schools. Both school are equipped with computers teaching, sports, social, science, language, mathematics and all types of subjects.
