= El Mirador Airport =

- IATA: PUX; ICAO: SCPV

Summary
- Airport type: Public
- Serves: Puerto Varas, Chile
- Elevation AMSL: 430 ft / 131 m
- Coordinates: 41°20′55″S 072°56′50″W

Map
- Location of El Mirador Airport in Chile

Runways
Direction	Length		Surface
Direction	m	ft	Surface
15/33	780	2,559	Asphalt
- Source: Landings.com Google Maps GCM

El Mirador Airport (Spanish: Aeropuerto El Mirador), (IATA: PUX, ICAO: SCPV) is an airport just southeast of Puerto Varas, a city in the Los Lagos Region of Chile. Puerto Varas is on the southwest shore of Llanquihue Lake.

The Puerto Montt VOR-DME (Ident: MON) is located 8.1 nautical miles (15.0 km) southwest of the airport.

== See also ==
- Transport in Chile
- List of airports in Chile
