= Playa Grande, Guatemala =

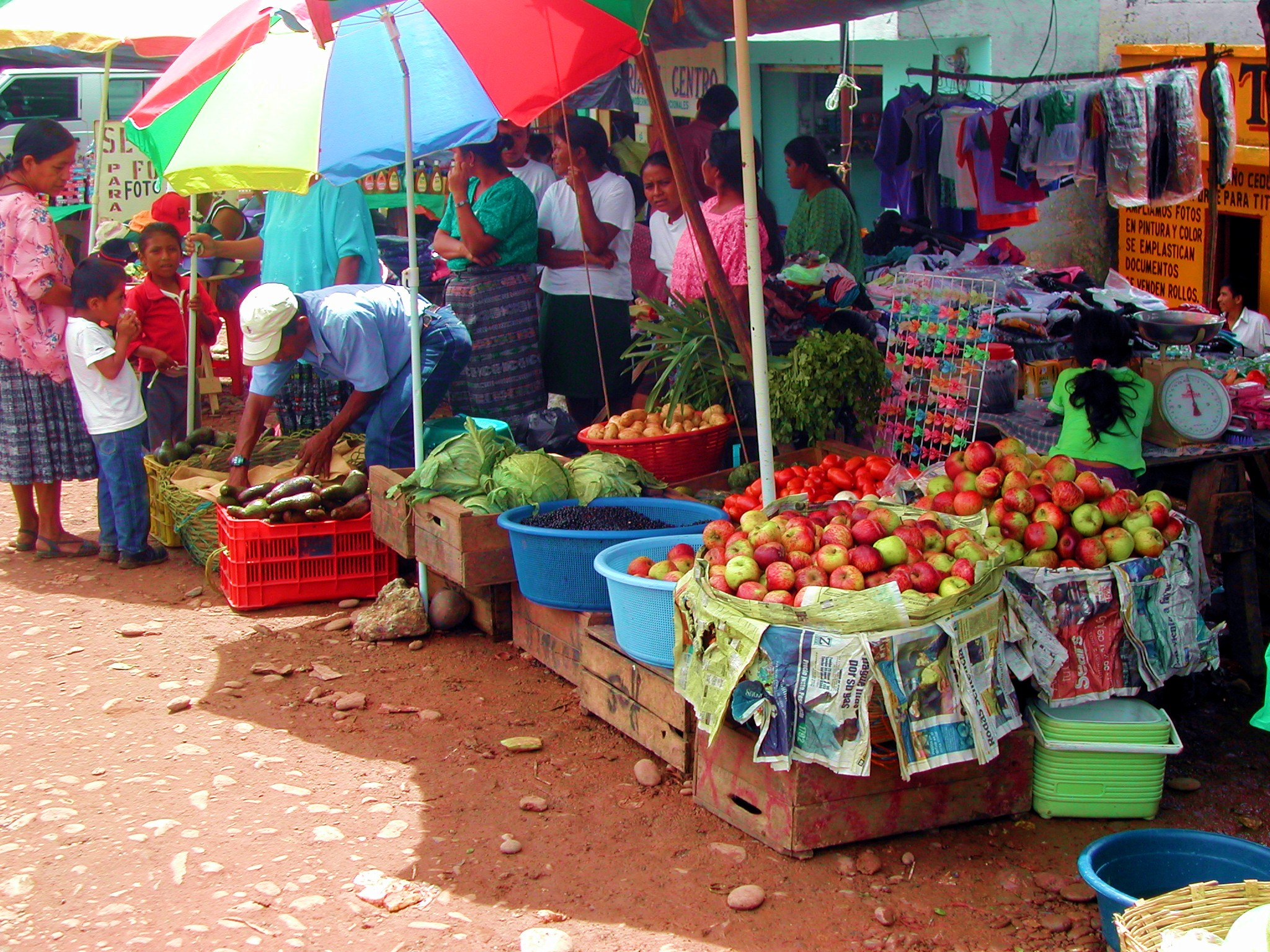
- The market in Playa Grande Ixcán

- Location in Guatemala
- Coordinates: 15°59′17″N 90°46′54″W
- Country: Guatemala
- Department: El Quiché
- Municipality: Ixcán

Population (2018 census)
  - Total: 12,710
  - Ethnicities: K'iche' Ixil Uspantek K'ekchi Ladino
  - Religions: Roman Catholicism Evangelicalism

Playa Grande ("Big beach") is the administrative centre of the municipality of Ixcán in the Guatemalan department of El Quiché.

Native Mayan languages spoken in the area include, among many others, Uspantek and Q'eqchi', although Spanish is also common.

Its annual festival is held from 15 to 17 May.

Playa Grande has an airport, Playa Grande Airport. Its International Air Transport Association code is PKJ.

== Xalalá hydroelectric dam ==
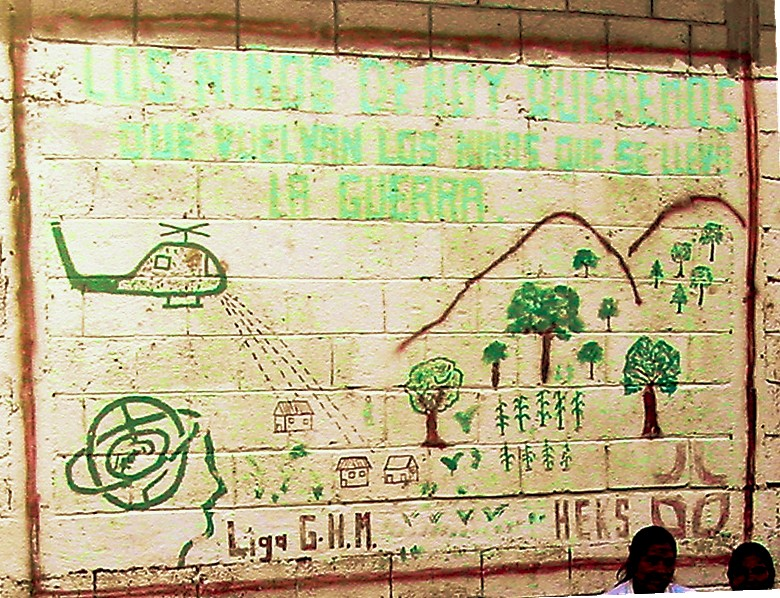
Pacifist mural depicting the Victory of January 20 in Ixcán

The Xalalá hydroelectric dam is a proposed development project in Ixcán. It is controversial because it will flood 31.8 km^{2} and displace twelve Q'eqchi' Maya communities. It is a project of the Plan Puebla Panama. The dam is opposed by the Organizational Commission of the Community Consultation of Good Faith, Ixcán, which wants the Instituto Nacional de Electrificación (INDE) to complete consultations with local indigenous groups pursuant to the International Labour Organization Convention No. 169, Article 7. The municipal government called for such a consultation on 2007-04-20.

== See also ==
- Ixcán
- El Quiché
- List of airports in Guatemala
- Plan Puebla Panama
- Guatemalan Civil War
- Mayan languages
- Uspantek language
- Q'eqchi' language
