= Miraflores, Guaviare =

Coordinates: 1.33667°N 71.9511°W

- Municipality and town
- Flag

- Location of the municipality and town of Miraflores, Guaviare in the Guaviare Department of Colombia.
- Country: Colombia
- Department: Guaviare Department

Area
  - Total: 11,709 km^{2} (4,521 sq mi)

Population (Census 2018)
  - Total: 5,007
  - Density: 0.4276/km^{2} (1.108/sq mi)
- Time zone: UTC-5 (Colombia Standard Time)
- Climate: Am

Miraflores is a town and municipality in the Guaviare Department, Colombia. The municipality was created on February 8, 1990. In August 1998 a Colombian National Police Base was overrun by the FARC guerrillas and later rebuilt and reoccupied in February 2004. The population of Guaviare in 1993 was approximately 14,381.

== Geography ==
Miraflores is located at N 01°22'14" - W 71°57'41" and 180 meters over sea level, approximately 150 km from the capital of the Department of Guaviare, San Jose del Guaviare near the Itilla and Unilla Rivers. The territory is flat or slightly undulated and covered by jungle, typical of the Amazon basin. Climate is calid and highly humid, maintaining an average temperature throughout the year of 28 °C. The municipality is surrounded by the Vaupés River as well as numerous other currents.

== History ==
Miraflores was founded by a group of colonizers during the 20th Century. It became a municipality of Colombia in 1990 when the then Comisaria of Guaviare became the Department of Guaviare.

== Economy ==
The legal economy in the region is mostly based on logging and agriculture, and to a minor scale artisan fishing. Due to the presence of the Revolutionary Armed Forces of Colombia (FARC) guerrilla and other groups involved in the illegal drug trade business, the economy in Miraflores was ruled by coca. The coca paste is sometimes used as currency, substituting the local Colombian peso or the US dollar.
