= Missionary Flights International =

Missionary Flights International (MFI) is a Florida-based charity that operates flights between Florida and areas of need in the Caribbean, primarily Haiti. MFI was founded in 1964 by Reverend Don H. Beldin; a notable past president is Richard Snook. On January 1, 2015, MFI welcomed its new president, Joe Karabensh

MFI makes regular bi-weekly flights to Haiti and the Dominican Republic, ferrying both supplies and missionaries. MFI also flies to other destinations as needs arise. One flight had been hijacked to the United States from Haiti on February 18, 1993.

== History ==
Don Beldin was just one man flying a small single-engine airplane in the 1960s for Youth for Christ evangelism in the Bahamas. Responding to need, Don began transporting other missionaries and equipment in his plane. In 1964, the Lord guided Don to incorporate Missionary Flights International (MFI) to meet the growing needs of Bible-centered missions. The need for air service increased, so MFI acquired larger planes and added new countries.

After 42 years in West Palm Beach, MFI moved to Fort Pierce, FL in 2006. Today, MFI operates out of two hangars flying turbine-powered DC-3s to meet the needs of over 450 missions in the Bahamas, Haiti, the Dominican Republic, and wherever the Lord directs. About 300 tons of cargo and 4,000 Christian workers are transported every year.
