= Port Alsworth Airport =

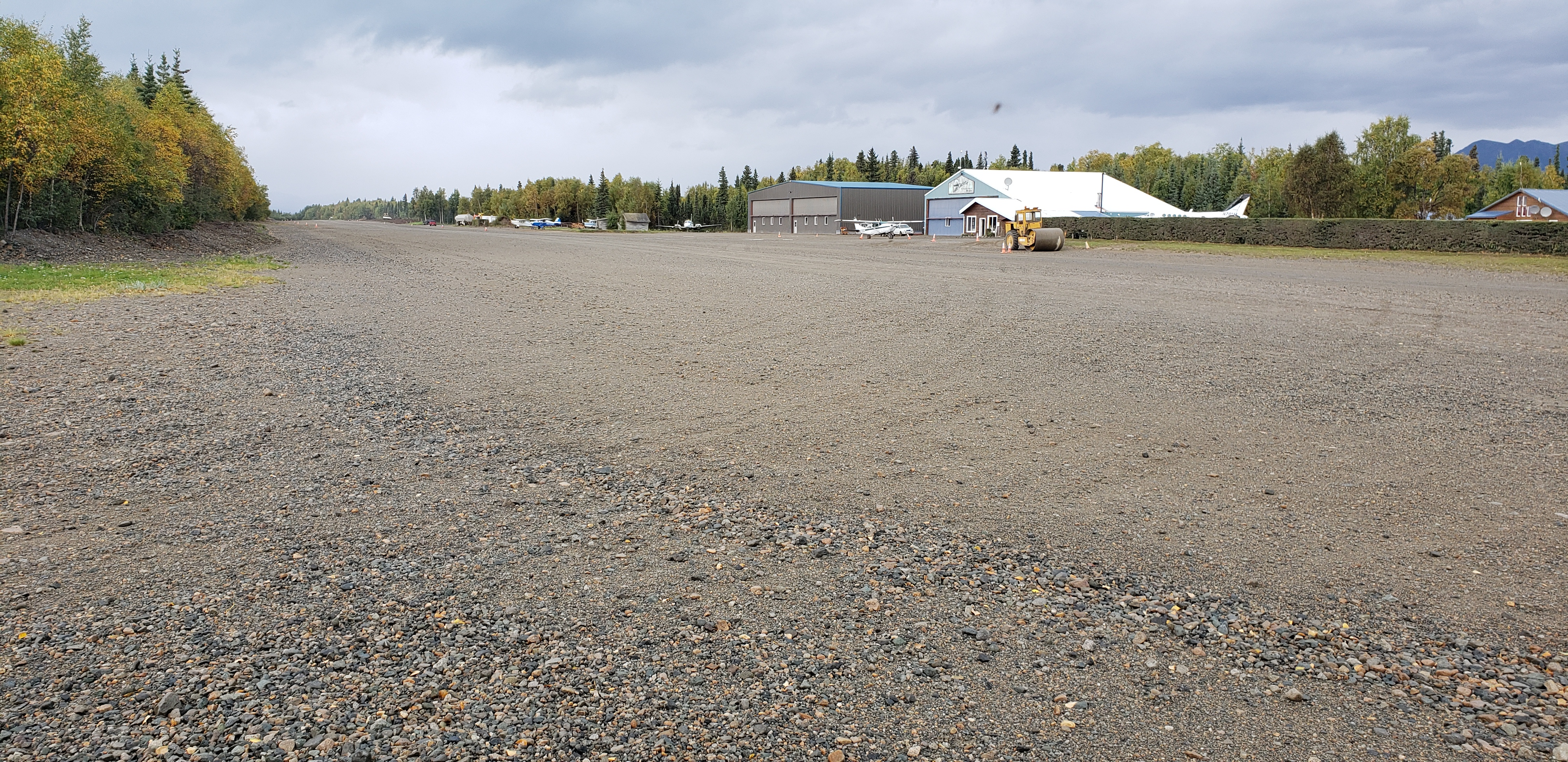
- IATA: PTA; ICAO: PALJ; FAA LID: TPO

Summary
- Airport type: Private
- Owner: Glen Alsworth, Sr.
- Serves: Port Alsworth, Alaska
- Elevation AMSL: 280 ft / 85 m
- Coordinates: 60°12′16″N 154°19′08″W

Map
- Location of airport in Alaska

Runways
Direction	Length		Surface
Direction	ft	m	Surface
6L/24R	3,000	914	Dirt/Gravel

Statistics (1984)
- Aircraft operations: 1,300
- Based aircraft: 13
- Source: Federal Aviation Administration

Port Alsworth Airport (IATA: PTA, ICAO: PALJ, FAA LID: TPO) is a private-use airport serving Port Alsworth which is located in the Lake and Peninsula Borough of the U.S. state of Alaska. As per Federal Aviation Administration records, the airport had 2,634 passenger boardings (enplanements) in calendar year 2019, an increase of 52.87% from the 1,723 enplanements in 2018.

Although many U.S. airports use the same three-letter location identifier for the FAA and IATA, this airport is assigned TPO by the FAA and PTA by the IATA.

== Facilities and aircraft ==
Port Alsworth Airport, which is privately operated, has one runway designated 6L/24R with a dirt and gravel surface measuring 3,000 by 100 feet (914 x 30 m). For the 12-month period ending September 5, 1984, the airport had 1,300 aircraft operations, an average of 108 per month: 81% air taxi and 19% general aviation. There are 25 aircraft based at this airport: 18 single-engine and 7 multi-engine.

It directly neighbors Wilder/Natwick Airport (ICAO: PAKX, FAA LID: 05K) which operates runway 6R/24L.

== Airlines and destinations ==
Airlines	Destinations
Lake Clark Air	Port Alsworth
Iliamna Air Taxi	Iliamna

== See also ==
- List of airports in Alaska
