= Pemon language =

Cariban language spoken in Venezuela

Pemon
- Arecuna
- Ingarikó, Kapon
- Native to: Venezuela, Brazil, Guyana
- Ethnicity: Pemon
- Native speakers: (6,000 cited 1990–2006)
- Language family: Cariban: Venezuelan Carib; Pemóng–Panare; Pemóng; Pemon
- Dialects: Camaracoto; Taurepang–Arekuna
- Writing system: Latin

Language codes
- ISO 639-3: aoc
- Glottolog: pemo1248
- ELP: Pemón
- Linguasphere: 80-AFA-b

Lino Figueroa, a Pemon, author of Makunaima, demonstrating the Pemon Language.

The Pemon language (or Pemón in Spanish) is an Indigenous language of the Cariban family spoken by some 30,000 Pemon people, in Venezuela's Southeast, particularly in the Canaima National Park, in the Roraima State of Brazil and in Guyana.

It covers several dialects, including Arecuna (or Arekuna), Camaracota, Camaracoto, Ingariko (or Ingarikó), and Taulipang or Taurepan (Camaracoto may be a distinct language). The Pemon language may also be known and designated informally by one of the two dialects Arecuna (or Arekuna) or Ingariko (or Ingarikó), or incorrectly under the name Kapon which normally designates another closely related small group of languages.

Pemon is one of several other closely related Venezuelan Cariban languages which also include the Macushi and Kapon (or Kapong, also sometimes used by natives to name the Pemon language itself, even if Kapon strictly covers only the two Akawaio and Patamona languages). These four languages (including Macushi) form the group of Pemongan (or Pemóng) languages. The broad Kapon (or Kapong) and selective Ingariko (or Ingarikó) terms are also used locally as a common ethnonym grouping Pemón, Akawaio, and Patamono peoples (and sometimes as well the Macushi people), and may be used as well to refer to the group of the four Pemongan (or Pemóng) languages that they speak.

== Typology ==
The Pemon language's syntax type is SOV with alternation to OVS.

== Writing ==
Pemon was an oral language until the 20th century. Then efforts were made to produce dictionaries and grammars, primarily by Catholic missionaries, specially Armellada and Gutiérrez Salazar. The Latin alphabet has been used, adding diacritic signs to represent some phonemes not existing in Spanish.

== Phonology ==
=== Vowels ===
Arekuna Pemon has the following vowels:

	Front	Central	Back
Close	i	ɨ	u
Open-mid	e	ɤ (Note: Edwards 1978 p. 224 uses the symbol ɵ for a mid back unrounded vowel.)	o
Open		a	

There are still texts only using Spanish characters, without distinguishing between pairs such as /o/ and /ɤ/. Diphthong sounds are [aɪ, au, ɔɪ, eɪ].

=== Consonants ===
	Labial	Dental	Alveolar	Palatal	Velar
Stop	p	t			k
Fricative			s		
Nasal	m	n			
Tap/Flap			ɾ		
Approximant				j	w

Allophones of /s n k j/ are [tʃ ŋ ʔ ʎ].

== Grammar ==
Pronouns in Pemon are:

Pemon	English
yuré	'I, me'
amäre	'you' (singular)
muere, mesere	'he, she'
urekon	'we'
ina	'we' (exclusive)
amärenokon	'you' (plural)
ichamonan	'they, them'

== Literature ==
- Edwards, Walter F. (1978). "A Preliminary Sketch of Arekuna (Carib) Phonology". International Journal of American Linguistics. 44 (3): 223–227. JSTOR 1264946.
- Gutiérrez Salazar, Mariano (2001). Gramática didáctica de la lengua pemón (in Spanish). Caracas: Universidad Católica Andrés Bello. ISBN 980-244-282-8.
- de Armellada, Cesáreo; Olza, Jesús (1999). Gramática de la lengua pemón (morfosintaxis) (in Spanish). Caracas: Universidad Católica Andrés Bello.
