= St. Clair County International Airport =

Airport in Michigan, United States

- IATA: PHN; ICAO: KPHN; FAA LID: PHN

Summary
- Airport type: Public
- Operator: St. Clair County
- Serves: Port Huron, Michigan
- Location: Kimball Township, Michigan
- Elevation AMSL: 650 ft / 198.1 m
- Coordinates: 42°54′39″N 82°31′44″W

Map
- Location of airport in Michigan PHN (the United States)

Runways
Direction	Length		Surface
Direction	ft	m	Surface
4/22	5,103	1,555	Asphalt
10/28	4,001	1,220	Asphalt

Statistics (2021)
- Aircraft movements: 27,375
- Based aircraft: 52

St. Clair County International Airport (IATA: PHN, ICAO: KPHN, FAA LID: PHN) is a public airport owned by the government of St. Clair County, Michigan, United States. It is located in Kimball Township, five miles (8 km) southwest of the central business district (CBD) of Port Huron. It is included in the Federal Aviation Administration (FAA) National Plan of Integrated Airport Systems for 2017–2021, in which it is categorized as a regional reliever airport facility.

== History ==
The airport has been in service since the 1940s. It originally serve military aircraft and has since moved largely to serving private and business aircraft.

In 2016, the airport closed for a time during nighttime due to power outages.

== Facilities and aircraft ==
St. Clair County International Airport covers 1,135 acres (459 ha) and has two runways:

- Runway 4/22: 5,103 x 100 ft. (1,555 x 30 m), surface: asphalt
- Runway 10/28: 4,001 x 75 ft. (1,220 x 23 m), surface: asphalt

The airport received a $4.6 million runway upgrade in 2019 to repave runway 4/22. The runway also received new lighting and electrical vaults, replacing a 25-year-old system.

For the 12-month period ending December 31, 2021, the airport had 27,375 aircraft operations, an average of 75 per day. It includes 98% general aviation and 2% military. For the same time period, there were 58 aircraft based on the field: 52 single-engine and 3 multi-engine airplanes as well as 3 jets.

The airport has an FBO offering fuel, general maintenance, conference rooms, crew lounges, snooze rooms, and showers.

== Additional information ==
Adjacent to the airport is an 80-acre (32 ha) Michigan certified business air industrial park.

Agents for U.S. Customs and Border Protection and the Department of Agriculture are available 24 hours a day for customs and international flights into the United States.

== Accidents and incidents ==
- On June 26, 2005, a Piper PA-31 Navajo impacted water during a visual approach to St Clair County. The six people aboard reported minor injuries. The probable cause was found to be fuel exhaustion during cruise flight, inadequate in-flight planning, and unsitable terrain encountered during the forced landing.
- On December 24, 2014, a Piper Seneca crashed during an instrument approach at St. Clair County.
- On September 6, 2018, a Cessna 340 crashed near the airport, killing the sole person on board. The pilot reported problems with the right engine before losing communications.

== See also ==
- List of airports in Michigan
