= Aliansa - Aerolineas Andinas =

Colombian airline

IATA	ICAO	Call sign
-	-	—
- Founded: 1989
- Commenced operations: 1995
- Hubs: Vanguardia Airport
- Fleet size: 4
- Headquarters: Vanguardia Airport
- Key people: Jorge Álvarez - The founder
- Website: www.aliansa.com.co

Aliansa – Aerolineas Andinas is a Colombian airline based at Vanguardia Airport. The airline was founded by Jorge Álvarez and his family on August 29, 1989, and commenced operations in 1995. Aliansa operates cargo, and passenger charter flights, mainly from Vanguardia Airport, and to the Amazon and eastern plains regions of Colombia. The airline serves approximately 95 percent of airports in Colombia.

== Fleet ==
The following consists of the fleet of Aliansa – Aerolineas Andinas as of August 2020.

Aliansa fleet
Aircraft	In service	Notes
Douglas DC-3	3	
Douglas DC-3TP	1	
Total	4	

== Accidents and incidents ==
- On November 10, 1999, an Aliansa DC-3 with registration HK-2581 was found crashed in the area of La Montañita. It was determined the plane broke up in mid air because the wreckage of the plane was spread out over the span of 7.2 km.
- On March 18, 1999, an Aliansa DC-3 with registration HK-337 disappeared from the radar on a flight from Cúcuta to El Yopal. On April 12, 1999, the aircraft was located on the Radial 287 from Tame Airport, at 24.2 nautical miles. The wreckage distribution and the evidence of the intact shrubbery near the crash site pointing to the probable cause of the crash being a stall. There was extreme turbulence, and this is what most likely caused the plane to stall.
- On May 8, 2014, an Aliansa Airlines DC-3 with registration HK-4700 flew over more mountainous and large terrain. This led the plane to impact the forested side of a mountain at 6,500 feet. The aircraft was damaged beyond recognition.
- On February 28, 2021, an Aliansa Airlines DC-3 with registration HK-2006, performing a flight from Mitu to Monfort Vaupeson with 3 crew, suffered an accident while landing at Monfort. There were no injuries, the aircraft received substantial damage however.
- On July 8, 2021, an Aliansa Airlines DC-3 with registration HK-2820, was on a training flight originating at Villavicencio with three crew members on board crashed while flying over Guatiquia, killing everyone on board.
