= Playa Grande Airport =

- IATA: PKJ; ICAO: MGPG

Summary
- Airport type: Public
- Serves: Playa Grande, Guatemala
- Elevation AMSL: 577 ft / 176 m
- Coordinates: 15°59′55″N 90°44′30″W

Map
- Location in Quiché Department Location in Guatemala

Runways
Direction	Length		Surface
Direction	m	ft	Surface
17/35	1,800	5,906	Gravel
- Source: Google Maps GCM

Playa Grande Airport (IATA: PKJ, ICAO: MGPG) is an airstrip serving the town of Playa Grande in the Quiché Department of Guatemala.

The runway is in the countryside 4 kilometres (2.5 mi) northeast of the town. The Rubelsanto non-directional beacon (Ident: RUB) is located 16.9 nautical miles (31.3 km) east of the airstrip.

== See also ==
- Transport in Guatemala
- List of airports in Guatemala
