= Putumayo Airport =

- IATA: PYO; ICAO: SEPT

Summary
- Airport type: Public
- Serves: Puerto El Carmen de Putumayo
- Elevation AMSL: 733 ft / 223 m
- Coordinates: 0°06′55″N 75°51′00″W

Map
- Location of the airport in Ecuador

Runways
Direction	Length		Surface
Direction	m	ft	Surface
17/35	1,100	3,609	Grass
- Sources: GCM Google Maps

Putumayo Airport (IATA: PYO, ICAO: SEPT) is an airport serving the Putumayo River village of Puerto El Carmen de Putumayo in Sucumbíos Province, Ecuador. The runway is in a bend of the river 1 kilometre (0.6 mi) east of the village.

The Tres Esquinas VOR-DME (Ident: TQS) is located 52.8 nautical miles (98 km) northeast of the airport.

== See also ==
- List of airports in Ecuador
- Transport in Ecuador
