= List of accidents and incidents involving the DC-3 since 2000 =

This is a list of accidents and incidents involving the Douglas DC-3^{A} that have taken place since 1 January 2000, including aircraft based on the DC-3 airframe such as the Douglas C-47 Skytrain, Basler BT-67 and Lisunov Li-2. Military accidents are included; and hijackings and incidents of terrorism are covered, although acts of war are outside the scope of this list.

== 2000 ==
17 March
Douglas DC-3C C-FNTF of Points North Air Services crashed at Ennadai Lake Airport in Canada while attempting a go-around. Both crew died; the cause was found to be that the aircraft's centre of gravity was too far to the rear, possibly due to the cargo shifting in flight. Both crew members were found to have high levels of carboxyhaemoglobin in their blood. The flight had departed from Points North Landing Airport, Points North Landing, Saskatchewan.

20 July
Douglas C-47A N54AA of Allied Air Freight suffered an engine failure on take-off from Grand Bahama International Airport in Freeport, Bahamas on a cargo flight to Nassau International Airport, Bahamas. The aircraft crashed while attempting to return to Grand Bahama and was destroyed. Both crew died.

2 September
Basler BT-67 FAC1659 of the Fuerza Aérea Colombiana was destroyed when it flew into the 11,200-foot (3,400 m) high Mount Montezuma in Colombia; all seven on board died.

9 November
In El Salvador, Basler BT-67 FAS119 of the Salvadoran Air Force was damaged beyond economic repair on landing at Los Comandos Airport, Los Comandos. The aircraft suffered brake failure, overran the runway and collided with a tree.

== 2001 ==
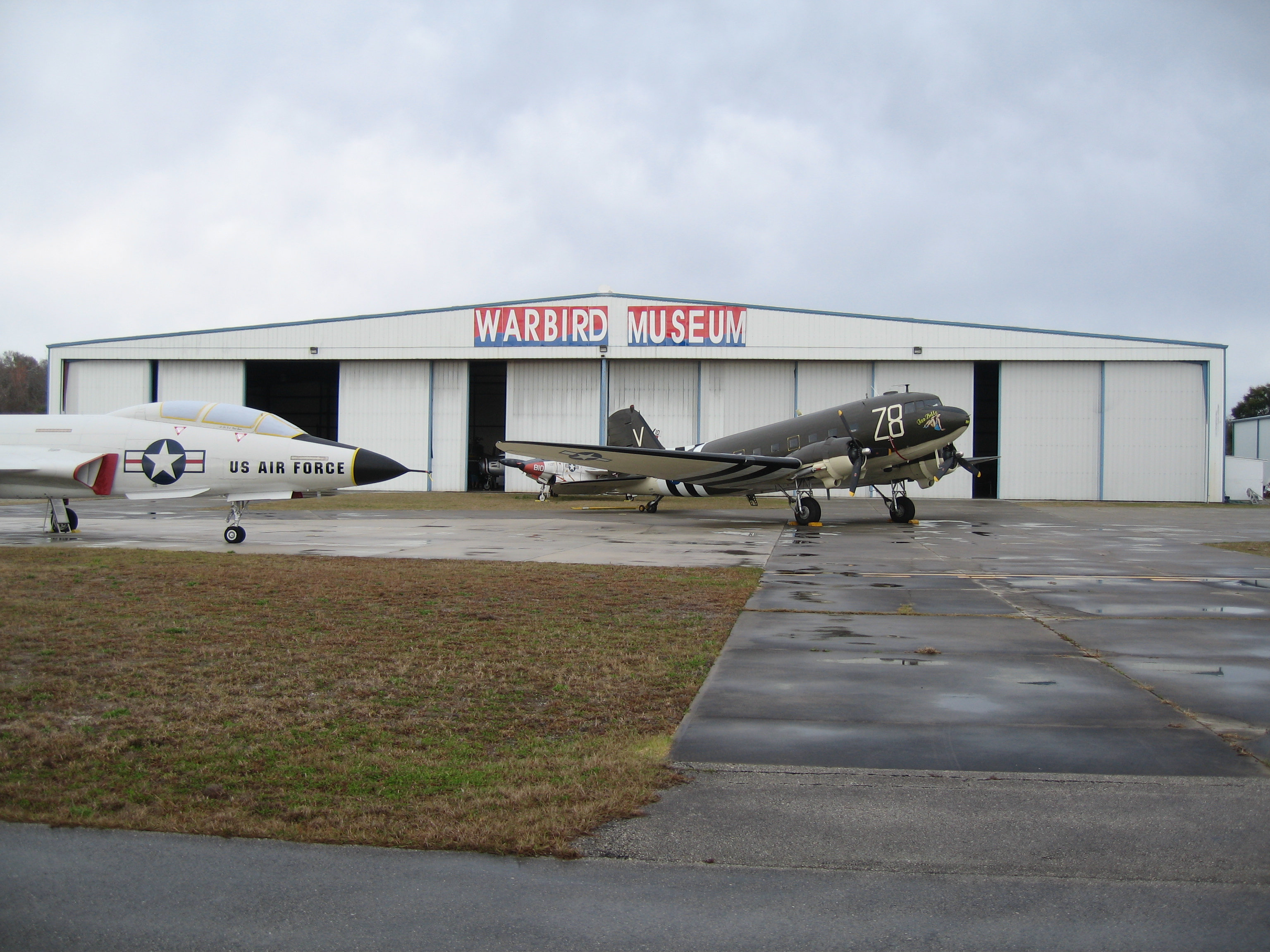
N3239T

23 January
In the United States, Douglas DC-3C N19454 of Majestic Air Cargo was destroyed when it flew into Table Top Mountain at an altitude of 1,500 feet (460 m) while on a flight from Unalaska Airport to Ted Stevens Anchorage International Airport, Anchorage, Alaska. Investigation revealed that no flight plan had been filed, which delayed the reporting of the aircraft as overdue. Both crew members tested positive for drugs - the captain for cocaine and the first officer for amitriptyline and nortriptyline.

25 January
RUTACA Airlines Flight 225, operated by Douglas DC-3C YV-224-C, crashed at Ciudad Bolívar in Venezuela; all 24 on board plus one person on the ground died. Another person on the ground was seriously injured. There were unconfirmed reports that a 25th person may have been on board the aircraft. The aircraft was on a non-scheduled domestic passenger flight from Tomás de Heres Airport, Ciudad Bolivar to Del Caribe "Santiago Mariño" International Airport, Porlamar and had developed an engine problem shortly after take-off.

15 March
In the United States, Douglas C-47A N842MB of Jim Hankins Air Service made a successful emergency landing at Donalsonville Municipal Airport, Donalsonville, Georgia, following an inflight engine failure, fire and separation of the starboard engine. The aircraft was on a cargo flight from Panama City-Bay County International Airport, Panama City, Florida, to Southwest Georgia Regional Airport, Albany, Georgia, it was assessed as damaged beyond economic repair. The aircraft was transported to the Museum of Aviation, Warner Robins, Georgia, in August 2005.

4 April
Douglas DC-3A N19BA of Roblex Aviation ditched in the sea off Luis Muñoz Marín International Airport in Carolina, Puerto Rico after suffering a double engine failure while on a local training flight. Both crew escaped. Damage to the aircraft was described as minor.

9 July
In the United States, Douglas C-47A N3239T of the Valiant Air Command Warbird Museum was substantially damaged in a landing accident at Space Coast Regional Airport, Titusville, Florida. The aircraft was returning from an air show at Pope Air Force Base, Fayetteville, North Carolina, and had made a refuelling stop at Moore County Airport, Southern Pines, North Carolina. The aircraft was later repaired and returned to service.

December
Air Katanga Douglas C-53 ZS-OJD was written off in a landing accident at Lubumbashi International Airport in the Democratic Republic of the Congo, after a delivery flight that originated in South Africa.

== 2002 ==
21 May
In the United States, Douglas DC-3A XB-JBR of Aero JBR ditched in Lake Casa Blanca, Texas, after a double engine failure while performing a touch-and-go at Laredo International Airport. It is reported that one of the engines suffered a propeller overspeed condition. All three crew escaped from the submerged aircraft.

== 2003 ==
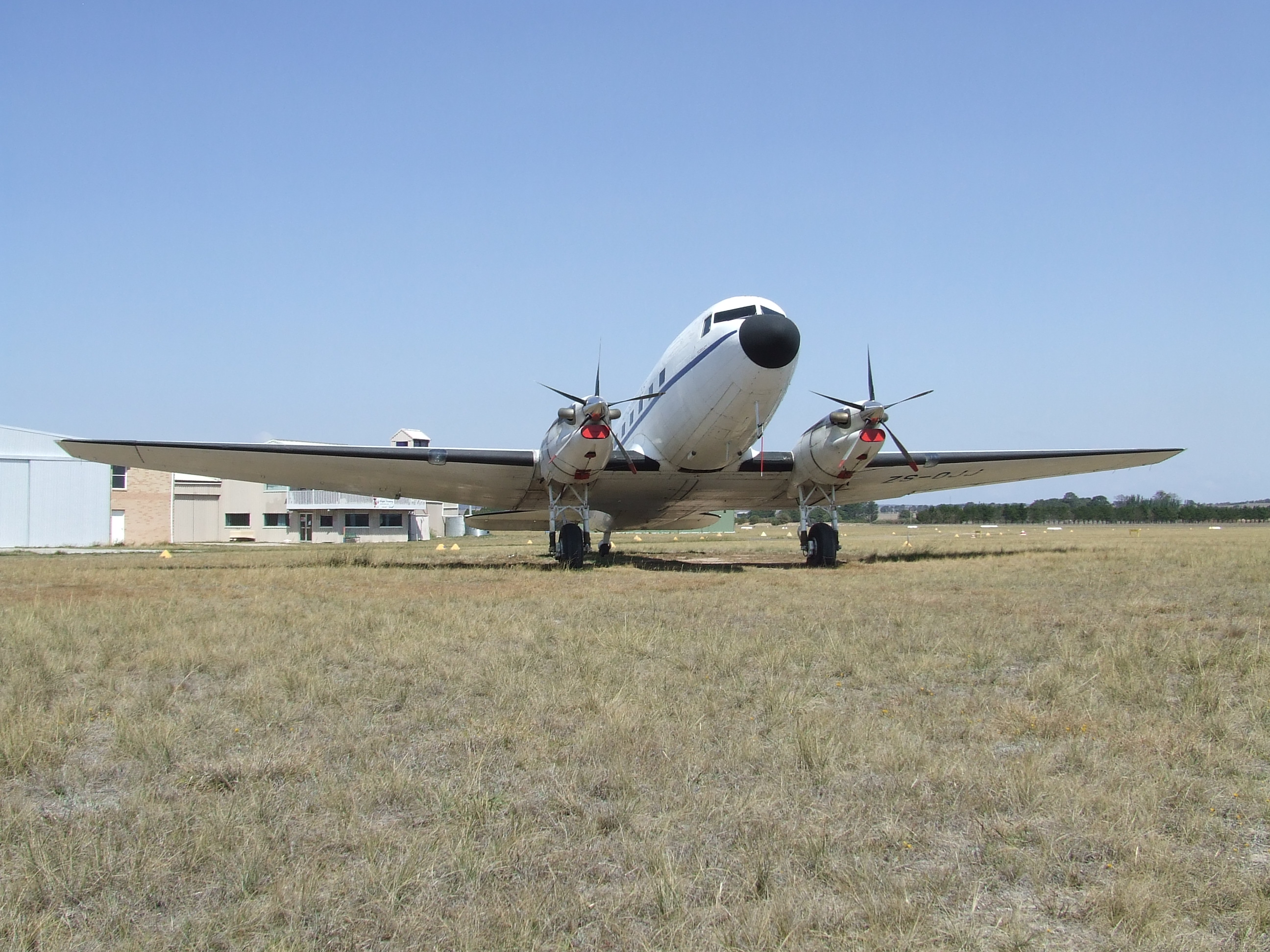
AMI DC-3-65TP

10 March
Aero Modifications International (AMI) DC-3-65TP^{A} ZS-MFY of Rossair Contracts was substantially damaged in a landing accident at Rumbek Airport in Sudan due to encountering windshear. The aircraft was repaired, and flown out on 17 April 2003.

19 March
Aerotaxi Flight 882, operated by Douglas DC-3C CU-T1192, was hijacked on a flight from Rafael Cabrera Airport, Nueva Gerona, Cuba to José Martí International Airport, Havana, Cuba. The aircraft landed in the United States at Key West International Airport, Key West, Florida, where the six hijackers were detained.

30 April
In Colombia, Basler BT-67 PNC-0212 of the Servicio Aéreo de Policía was damaged beyond repair when it overran the runway at Aguas Claras Airport, Ocaña.

2 October
A Douglas DC-3 operating an illegal flight for the Autodefensas Unidas de Colombia was destroyed by the Fuerza Aérea Colombiana at Bocas del Rosario in Colombia.

21 November
Douglas C-47A ZS-BXF, operating South African Air Force Historic Flight Flight 668, was substantially damaged in a forced landing in South Africa after both engines failed shortly after take-off from Lanseria International Airport, Johannesburg, due to fuel mismanagement. The aircraft's destination was AFB Swartkop, Centurion. Repairs were carried out at OR Tambo International Airport, Kempton Park, Gauteng. The restored aircraft flew out on 10 November 2006.

30 December
Douglas DC-3C N781T of Tol-Air Services was substantially damaged when the starboard undercarriage collapsed on landing at Cyril E. King Airport, Charlotte Amalie, United States Virgin Islands after a flight that originated at San Juan, Puerto Rico.

== 2004 ==
March
Fuerza Aérea Guatemalteca Basler BT-67 FAG-580 was written off when it overshot a runway on landing at an unknown location in Guatemala.

20 June
In Colombia, Douglas C-49J HK-1212 of Viarco suffered an engine fire on take-off from Las Gaviotas Airport, Gaviotas and crashed into trees. The aircraft was on a non-scheduled domestic passenger flight to German Olano Airport, Puerto Carreño. All 20 on board escaped.

26 June
In Russia, Lisunov Li-2T RA-1300K of FLA RF crashed at Zaozerye shortly after take-off from Myachkovo Airport, Moscow and was destroyed. The aircraft was operating a domestic non-scheduled passenger flight to Grabtsevo Airport, Kaluga. Two of the five people on board died.

23 July
Fuerza Aérea Salvadoreña Basler BT-67 FAS117 was substantially damaged when the undercarriage collapsed on landing at El Jaguey in El Salvador.

13 August
In the United States, Douglas DC-3 N22RB was written off at Orlando-Herndon Airport, Orlando, Florida, during Hurricane Charley when it was blown onto its back and smashed against a hangar.

15 October
Douglas DC-3C HK-1504 of AeroVanguardia flew into an electricity line and crashed near Medellín, Colombia on approach to Enrique Olaya Herrera Airport while performing a domestic cargo flight from La Vanguardia Airport, Villavicencio to José María Córdova International Airport, Medellín. The flight had been diverted from its intended destination due to fog. The three crew died.

17 December
Douglas DC-3 HK-2663 of Arall Colombia was substantially damaged when it overran the runway at Puerto Gaitán Airport in Puerto Gaitán, Colombia. The aircraft was on a domestic scheduled passenger flight from Barranco Minas Airport to La Vanguardia Airport, Villavicencio when the starboard engine started vibrating and a diversion was made. Although substantially damaged, the aircraft was subsequently repaired and returned to service.

== 2005 ==
6 June
In Colombia, Douglas DC-3A HK-3462 of Transportes Aéreos del Ariari crashed near Miraflores shortly after take-off from Miraflores Airport when an engine caught fire. The aircraft was on a chartered domestic passenger flight to Jorge Enrique González Torres Airport, San José del Guaviare.

13 June
In the United States, Douglas R4D-8 N3906J of Air Pony Express suffered an engine failure shortly after take-off from Fort Lauderdale Executive Airport, Fort Lauderdale, Florida, on an international cargo flight to Marsh Harbour Airport, Marsh Harbour, Bahamas. The aircraft was written off when it was put down on a street in the Coral Ridge Isles residential neighbourhood of Fort Lauderdale, hitting trees, parked cars and a building and subsequently catching fire. The engine that failed had had maintenance work performed immediately before the accident flight.

19 June
In the Democratic Republic of the Congo, Douglas C-47B 9Q-CWI of Wimbi Dira Airways was damaged beyond repair when it suffered a groundloop on landing at Kabalo Airport, Kabalo. The aircraft ended up in a minefield and the wreckage remains in situ.

24 October
In the United States, Douglas C-53 N7500A was substantially damaged at Opa-locka Airport, Florida during Hurricane Wilma.

== 2006 ==
19 July
Douglas DC-3C N782T of Tol-Air Services ditched into the sea off Charlotte Amalie, United States Virgin Islands after an engine failure shortly after take-off from Cyril E. King Airport. All four people on board escaped as the aircraft floated for about ten minutes before sinking. The aircraft now lies in 100 feet (30 m) of water and is a dive site.

== 2007 ==
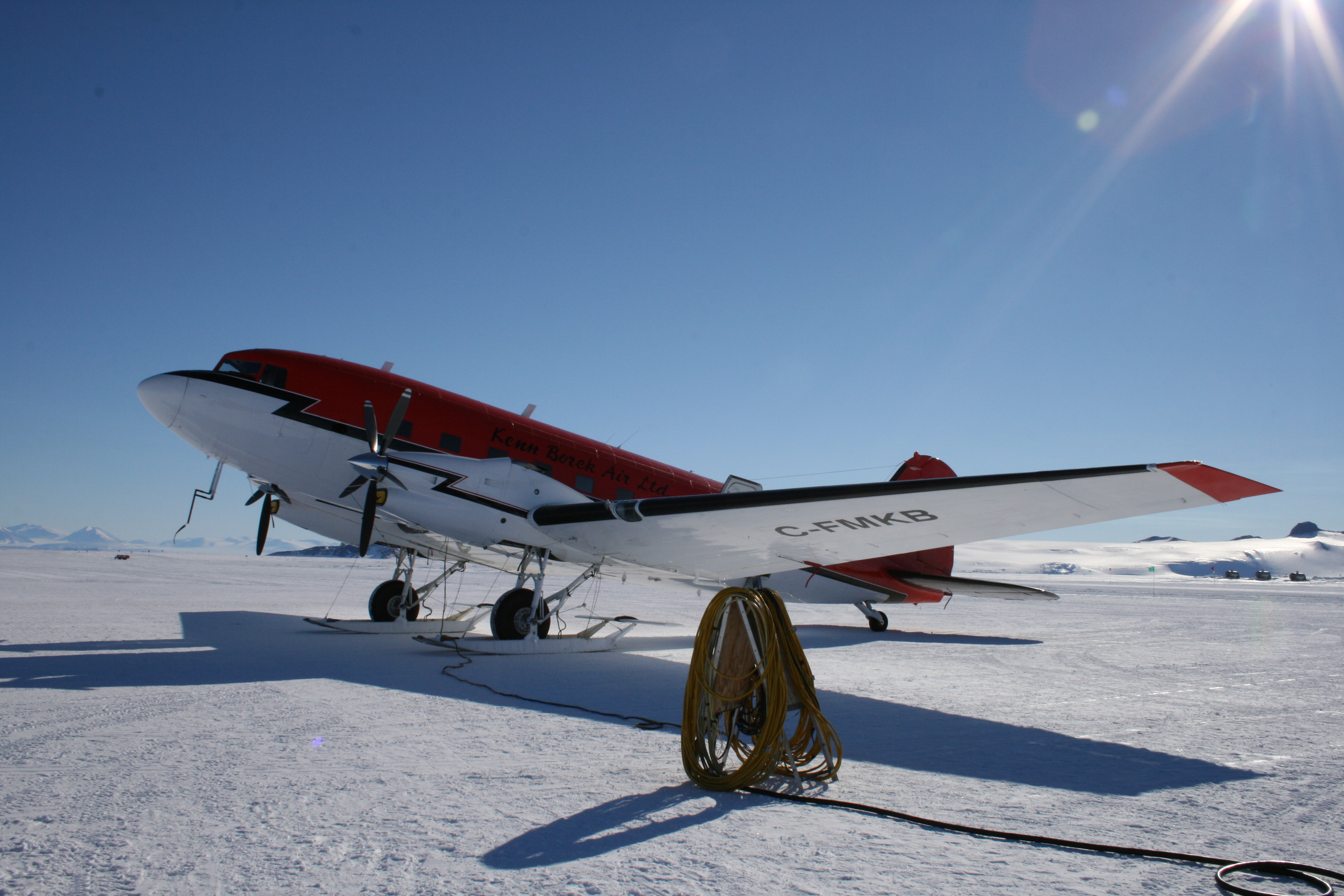
C-FMKB

25 May
In Colombia, Douglas DC-3C HK-3199 of AeroVanguardia was substantially damaged when it departed the runway at Acaricuara Airport, Acaricuara on landing after a flight from Jorge Enrique González Torres Airport, San José del Guaviare. The aircraft was repaired and returned to service.

31 July
Douglas DC-3C HK-1149 of AeroVanguardia was substantially damaged when a forced landing was made in a rice field at Puerto Concordia in Colombia. The aircraft was on a scheduled domestic passenger flight from Jorge Enrique González Torres Airport, an José del Guaviare to La Vanguardia Airport, Villavicencio when an engine failed.

20 December
Basler BT-67 C-FMKB of Kenn Borek Air was substantially damaged in a take-off accident at Mount Patterson, Antarctica when the take-off was attempted with insufficient speed for flight. Of the 12 people on board, only the co-pilot suffered minor injuries. Although both sets of undercarriage collapsed and the port wing was damaged, the aircraft was later repaired and returned to service.

== 2008 ==
24 January
Douglas DC-3C HK-2006 of Viarco was substantially damaged in a landing accident at Teresita Airport in Teresita, Colombia. The aircraft was operating a domestic non-scheduled passenger flight from Jorge Enrique González Torres Airport, San José del Guaviare. All 13 passengers and crew escaped, the aircraft was subsequently repaired and returned to service.

== 2009 ==
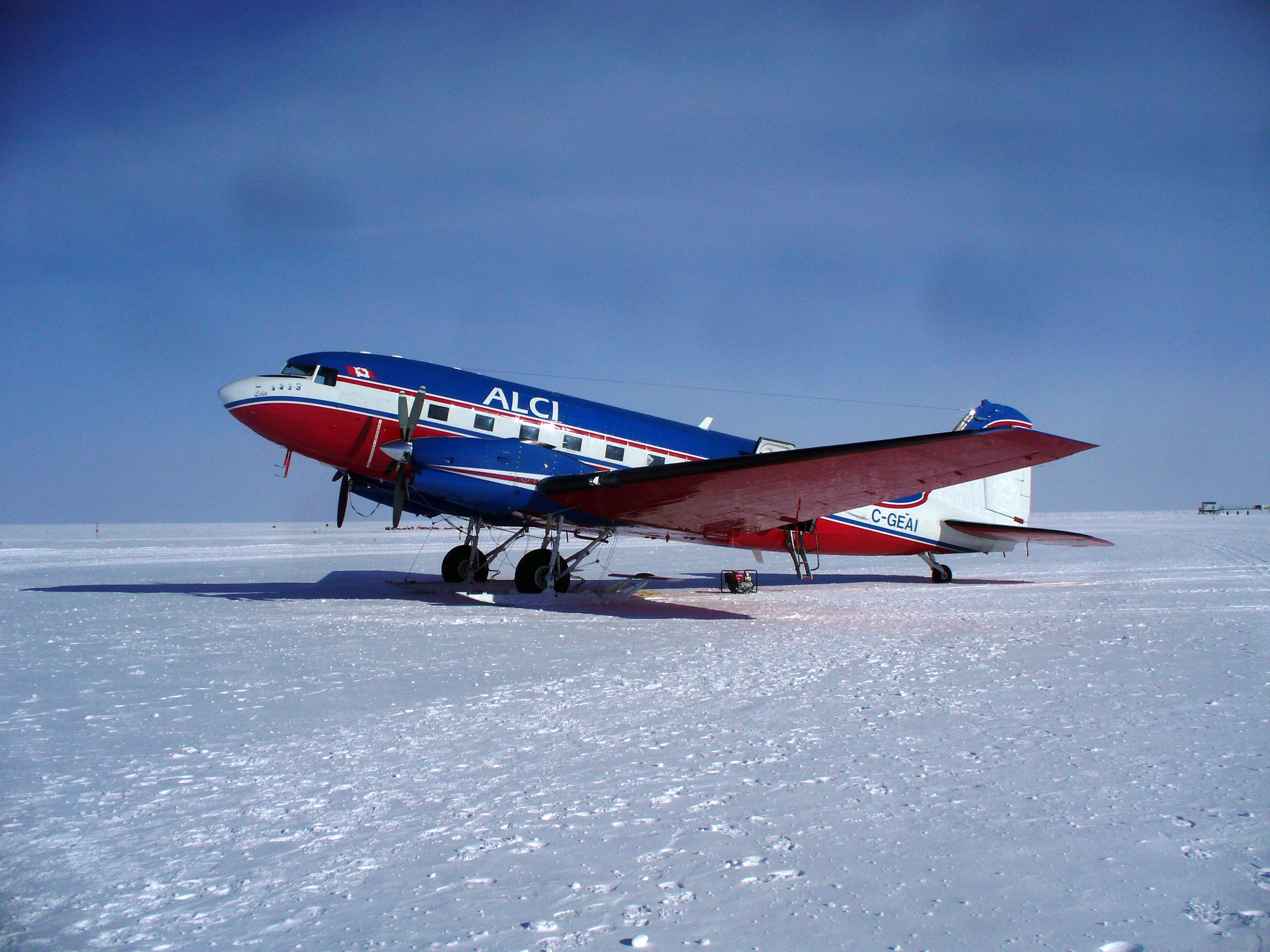
ALCI BT-67

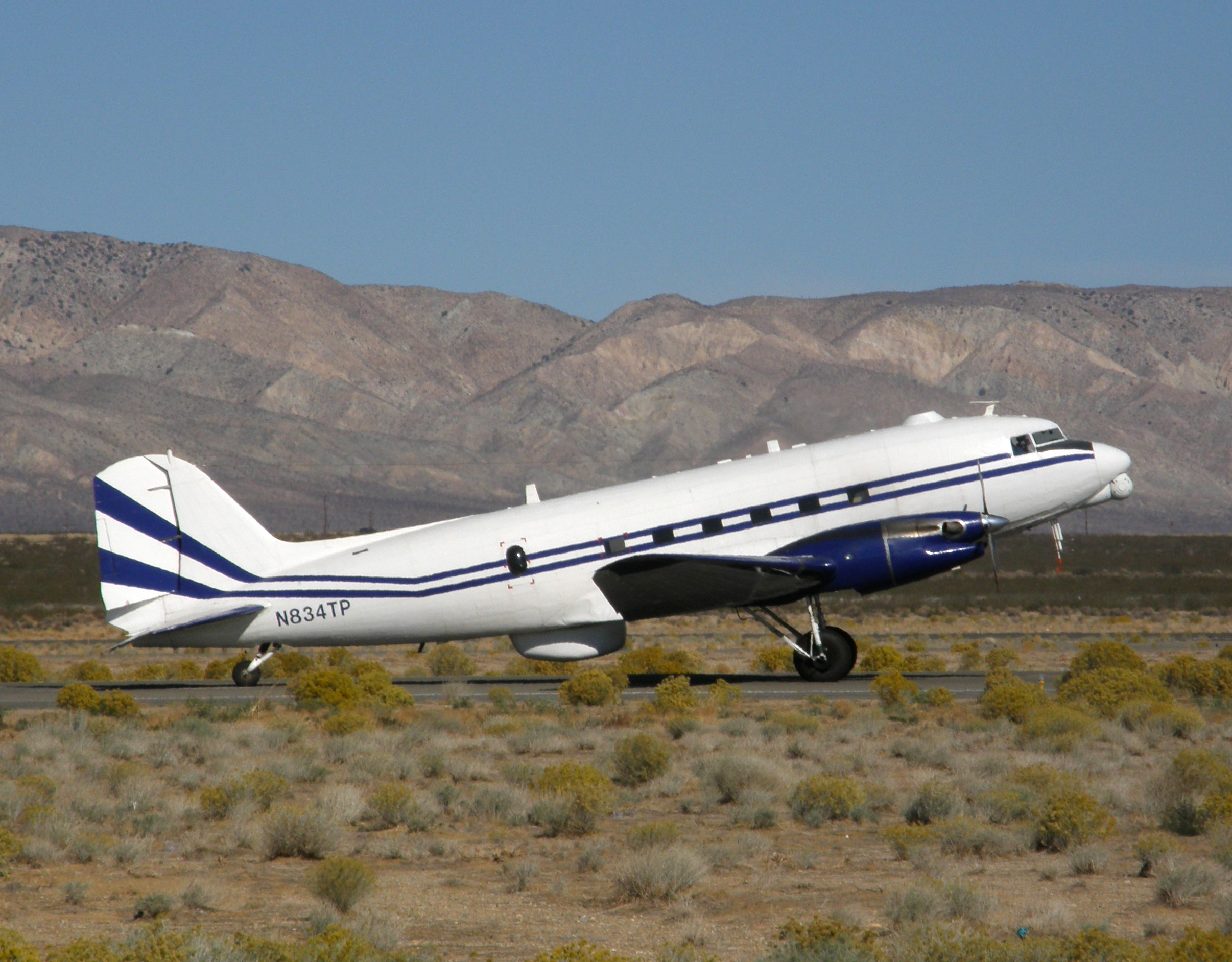
N834TP

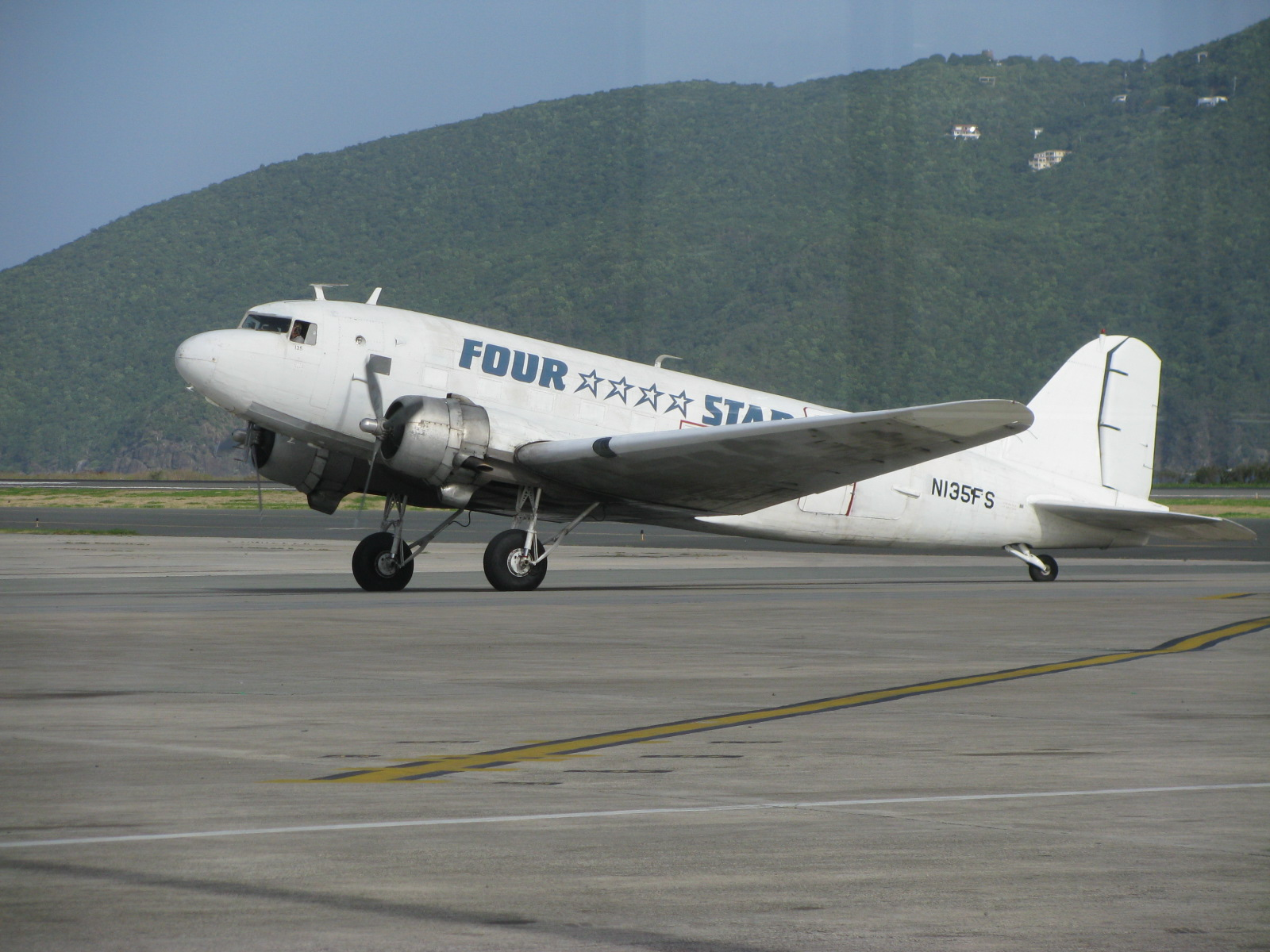
Four Star Air Cargo Douglas DC-3C

4 January
Basler BT-67 C-GEAJ of Antarctic Logistics Centre International crashed on landing at Tony Camp, Antarctica (74°04′56″S 10°54′28″E) after a flight from Novolazarevskaya Station.

4 February
In the United States, Douglas DC-3-65/AR^{A} N834TP of the National Test Pilot School was substantially damaged in a take-off accident at Mojave Air and Space Port, Mojave, California. Both sets of undercarriage and the port engine were ripped off. The aircraft was on a local training flight. The accident was caused by an incorrectly set rudder trim.

18 February
In Colombia, Basler BT-67 FAC1670 of the Fuerza Aérea Colombiana crashed near Captain Germán Olano Moreno Air Base, Palanquero on a local training flight. All five crew died.

The same day, another Basler BT-67 was lost in Colombia when PNC-0211 of the Servicio Aéreo de Policia was destroyed by the accidental detonation of a number of hand grenades at Enrique Olaya Herrera Airport, Medellín. Eight people were injured, four seriously. The aircraft was due to fly 25 police officers to El Caraño Airport, Quibdó.

26 April
Douglas DC-3C N136FS of Four Star Air Cargo was destroyed when a fire broke out in the cockpit at Luis Muñoz Marín International Airport, Carolina, Puerto Rico. The aircraft was taxiing for take-off on a mail flight to Cyril E. King Airport, Charlotte Amalie, United States Virgin Islands.

17 October
In the Philippines, Douglas C-47D RP-C550 of Victoria Air crashed after take-off from Ninoy Aquino International Airport, Manila and was destroyed; all four crew on board died. The aircraft was operating a cargo flight to Puerto Princesa International Airport, Puerto Princesa City. Amongst the cargo were six drums of aviation fuel. An intense fire broke out which destroyed the aircraft. Twenty-two houses were destroyed by fire.

== 2010 ==
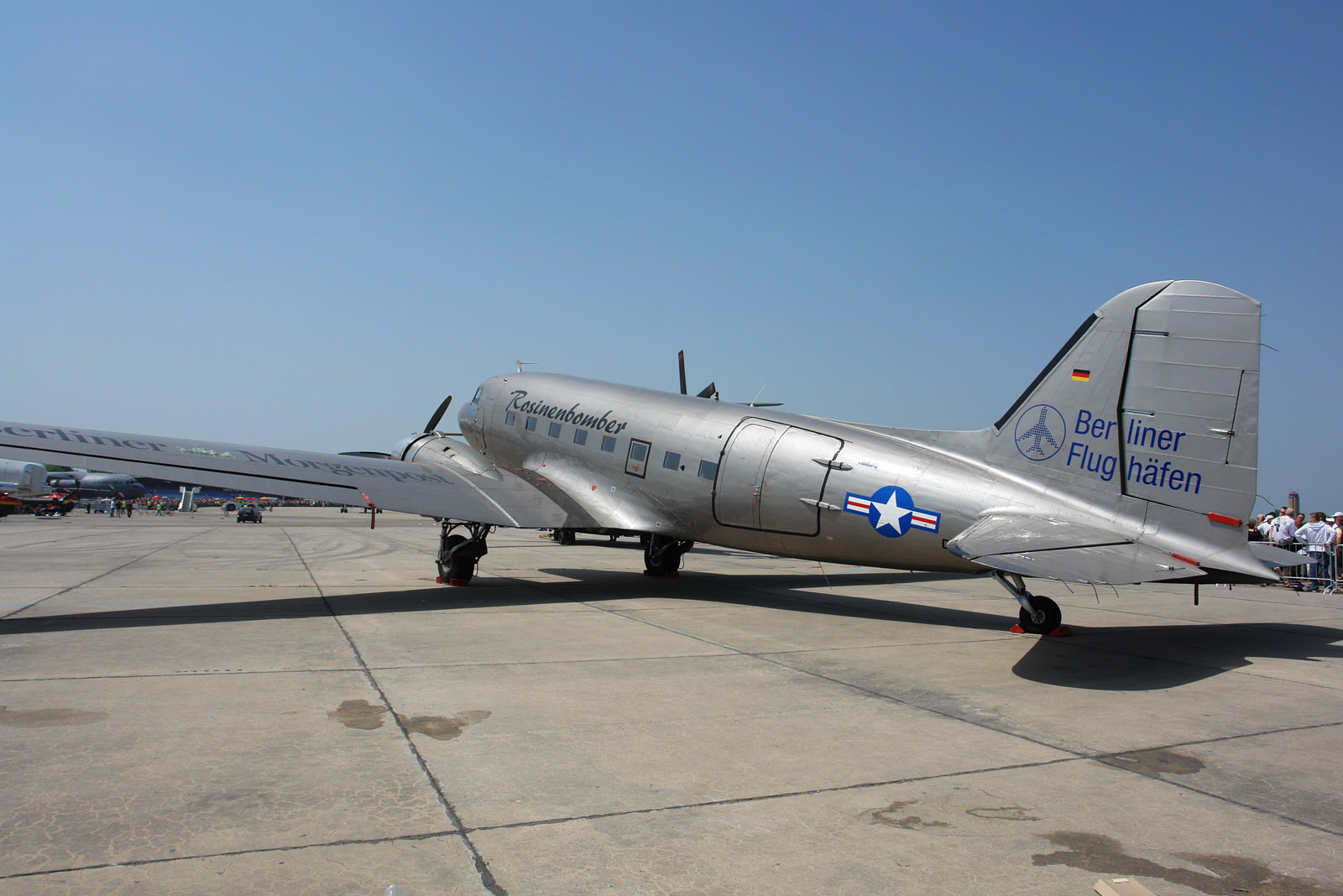
D-CXXX

19 June
In Germany, Douglas DC-3C D-CXXX of Berlin Air Services crashed on take-off from Berlin Schönefeld Airport on a local sightseeing flight. Eight of the 25 passengers and crew were injured, the aircraft was substantially damaged.

13 August
Douglas C-47 44-76787 (USAAF serial) was substantially damaged when it became jammed under a bridge on the A4 motorway at Leiden in the Netherlands. The aircraft was being transported by road from the Wings of Liberation Museum, Schijndel to Valkenburg Naval Air Base, where it was to be used as a prop in a musical based on the film Soldaat van Oranje about Erik Hazelhoff Roelfzema.

6 November
Douglas DC-3C HK-4700 of LASER Aéro Colombia was substantially damaged after its brakes failed during landing at Guerima Airport in Colombia; the aircraft was on a domestic cargo flight from Villavicencio. During the landing roll the hydraulic system lost pressure after the hose to the starboard main landing gear brake assembly failed; the pilot shut down both engines but lost control while trying to steer the aircraft without brakes; and it swerved off the runway and into a ditch, seriously damaging the starboard wing.

== 2012 ==
5 December
A South African Air Force C-47TP of 35 Squadron SAAF went missing in bad weather conditions en route from Waterkloof Air Force base in Pretoria to Qunu in the Eastern Cape province of South Africa. The wreckage was later found in Giant's Castle during search and rescue operations, in the Drakensberg in KwaZulu-Natal. All 11 passengers and crew members on board died.

20 December
In Antarctica, Basler BT-67 C-GEAI of Kenn Borek Air was substantially damaged while attempting to take off from a glacier at Holtanna Peak. It lifted off prematurely after the aircraft's wheels hit a snowbank during its takeoff roll. The aircraft stalled at a low level and it hit the ground, tearing off the landing gear. Of the 15 passengers and two crew on board, two received slight injuries, the others were uninjured.

== 2013 ==
19 August
In Canada, Buffalo Airways Flight 168, operated by Douglas DC-3C C-GWIR, suffered an engine fire on take off from Yellowknife Airport for Hay River Airport. The aircraft was substantially damaged when it made a wheels-up landing short of Runway 10. There were no injuries amongst the 21 passengers and three crew.

== 2014 ==
8 May
Douglas DC-3C HK-4700 of ALIANSA Colombia was destroyed in crash in mountainous terrain in Colombia while en route on a domestic cargo flight from Villavicencio to Florencia, Caquetá. All five passengers and crew were killed. The same aircraft had been damaged in a landing accident three-and-a-half years earlier, on 6 November 2010.

== 2016 ==
7 April
In Colombia, a DC-3 (converted from a C-47A-5-DK) of Arall Colombia, with the registration HK-2663, suffered an engine failure on take-off from Puerto Gaitán Airport for La Vanguardia Airport, Villavicencio. A forced landing was made but the aircraft was destroyed by fire.

== 2017 ==
17 March
In Canada, Basler BT-67 C-FKGL of North Star Air crashed on take-off from Pickle Lake Airport, Ontario. The three crew were uninjured.

== 2018 ==
12 July
In Colombia, DC-3C HK-3293 of Air Colombia crashed on landing at San Felipe Airport, San Felipe.
21 July
In the United States, Douglas C-47B N47HL ("Bluebonnet Belle") of the Commemorative Air Force crashed on take-off from Burnet Municipal Airport, Burnet, Texas, and was destroyed by fire. All thirteen people on board survived.

== 2019 ==
21 January
In the United States, Douglas DC-3C-65TP N467KS of Priority Air Charter struck power lines and trees and crashed just after takeoff from Stoltzfus Airfield, Kidron, Ohio, killing the pilot and co-pilot.
9 March
In Colombia, Douglas DC-3 HK2494 of LASER Aéro Colombia crashed near San Carlos de Guaroa whilst on a flight from San José del Guaviare and Villavicencio. All 14 people on board were killed.
3 May
In Canada, Douglas DC-3 C-GJKM of Buffalo Airways suffered an engine failure whilst on a flight from Hay River Airport to Yellowknife Airport, Northwest Territories. An attempt was made to return to Hay River, but the aircraft made a forced landing and was severely damaged.
21 June
in Canada, a Basler BT-67 of North Star Air ditched in a lake near Eabametoong, Ontario. Both crew survived. Inadvertent movement of fuel levers was determined to be a likely cause.
3 December
in Canada, a Basler BT-67 of North Star Air contacted trees and impacted ground amidst a forest on approach to Sachigo Lake, Ontario. Both crew survived.

== 2021 ==
28 February
Douglas DC-3C HK-2006 of ALIANSA Colombia crashed on landing at Monfort Airport; all three on board survived.
8 July
In Colombia, a Douglas DC-3, registration HK-2820, went missing in Colombia and is understood to have crashed at Guatiquia canyon, with three people on board. The aircraft belongs to a regional cargo carrier called Aliansa Aerolíneas Andinas.

== See also ==
- List of accidents and incidents involving the DC-3
- List of accidents and incidents involving the DC-3 in the 1950s
- List of accidents and incidents involving the DC-3 in the 1960s
- List of accidents and incidents involving the DC-3 in the 1970s
- List of accidents and incidents involving the DC-3 in the 1980s
- List of accidents and incidents involving the DC-3 in the 1990s

== Notes ==
^Note A Military versions of the DC-3 were known as C-47 Skytrain, C-48, C-49, C-50, C-51, C-52, C-53 Skytrooper, C-68, C-84, C-117 and YC-129 by the United States Army Air Forces and the United States Air Force; and as the R4D and C-117 by the United States Navy. In Royal Air Force (and other British Commonwealth air forces') service, these aircraft were known as Dakotas. A number of DC-3s have been rebuilt with turboprop engines and have a variety of designations. The Basler BT-67 is probably the best known of these; others include the DC-3-65/AR and the AMI DC-3-65TP. Licence-built aircraft include the Lisunov Li-2 and Showa L2D.
