= List of accidents and incidents involving the DC-3 in the 1980s =

This is a list of accidents and incidents involving the Douglas DC-3^{A} that have taken place in the period 1980–1989, including aircraft based on the DC-3 airframe such as the Douglas C-47 Skytrain and Lisunov Li-2. Military accidents are included; and hijackings and incidents of terrorism are covered, although acts of war are outside the scope of this list.

== 1980 ==
5 January
In Canada, Douglas DC-3 C-FBKX of Lambair was damaged at Thompson Airport in Thompson, Manitoba. The landing gear retracted while the aircraft was on the ground, after the selector control in the cockpit was inadvertently moved to the 'up' position.

18 January
Douglas C-47A L2-13/96 of 603 Squadron, Royal Thai Air Force crashed into the sea off the coast of Thailand near Si Racha. All five people on board were killed. The aircraft was struck off charge on 4 February.

24 January
In Colombia, Douglas C-53D HK-2214 of Aerotal Colombia crashed at El Dorado International Airport, Bogotá after an inflight engine failure following which the propeller on the operating engine was mistakenly feathered. The aircraft was on a test flight. All four on board were killed.

1 March
A Douglas C-47 of the Fuerza Aérea Guatemalteca was damaged beyond repair near La Aurora International Airport in Guatemala.

13 March
Douglas C-47B CP-1243 of Aerolíneas La Paz crashed at Beni, Colombia shortly after take-off from Beni Airport. The aircraft was on a cargo flight to San Borja Airport, Bolivia.

18 March
In Ethiopia, Douglas C-47B ET-AGM of Ethiopian Airlines crashed whilst on a single-engined approach to Bole International Airport, Addis Ababa. The aircraft was on a training flight.

11 April
In the United States, Douglas C-47A N64490 crashed on take-off from Athol-Silverwood Airport, Idaho following an engine failure. Both crewmembers and one of the four passengers were killed.

23 April
Douglas C-47B N709Z of Florida Preferred Equity crashed in the United States near Dania, Florida when it stalled whilst a go-around was performed. The aircraft was on a private passenger flight from South Bimini Airport in the Bahamas to Fort Lauderdale International Airport, Florida. One of the eight people on board was severely injured.

28 May
Douglas C-47 HR-SAC of SAHSA crashed on approach to Útila Airport in Honduras when the landing gear struck a wall.

2 July
A Douglas C-47 of the Royal Thai Navy crashed into the Gulf of Thailand. Two of the twenty-one people on board were killed.

12 July
A Douglas C-47 crashed on approach to Haiti's Toussaint Louverture International Airport, killing all three people on board. The aircraft was being used illegally to transport marijuana.

1 August
in the United States, Douglas R4D N45864 crashed at New Smyrna Beach, Florida shortly after take-off from New Smyrna Beach Municipal Airport on a ferry flight to Queen Beatrix International Airport, Aruba. The unqualified pilot, who had been drinking, was killed.

8 August
Douglas DC-3 G-AMYJ of Lease Air was damaged at London's Gatwick Airport in the United Kingdom when it collided with a ground power unit.

23 August
Douglas C-47 HJ235 of the Indian Air Force crashed at Guwahati Airport in India, killing all nine people on board.

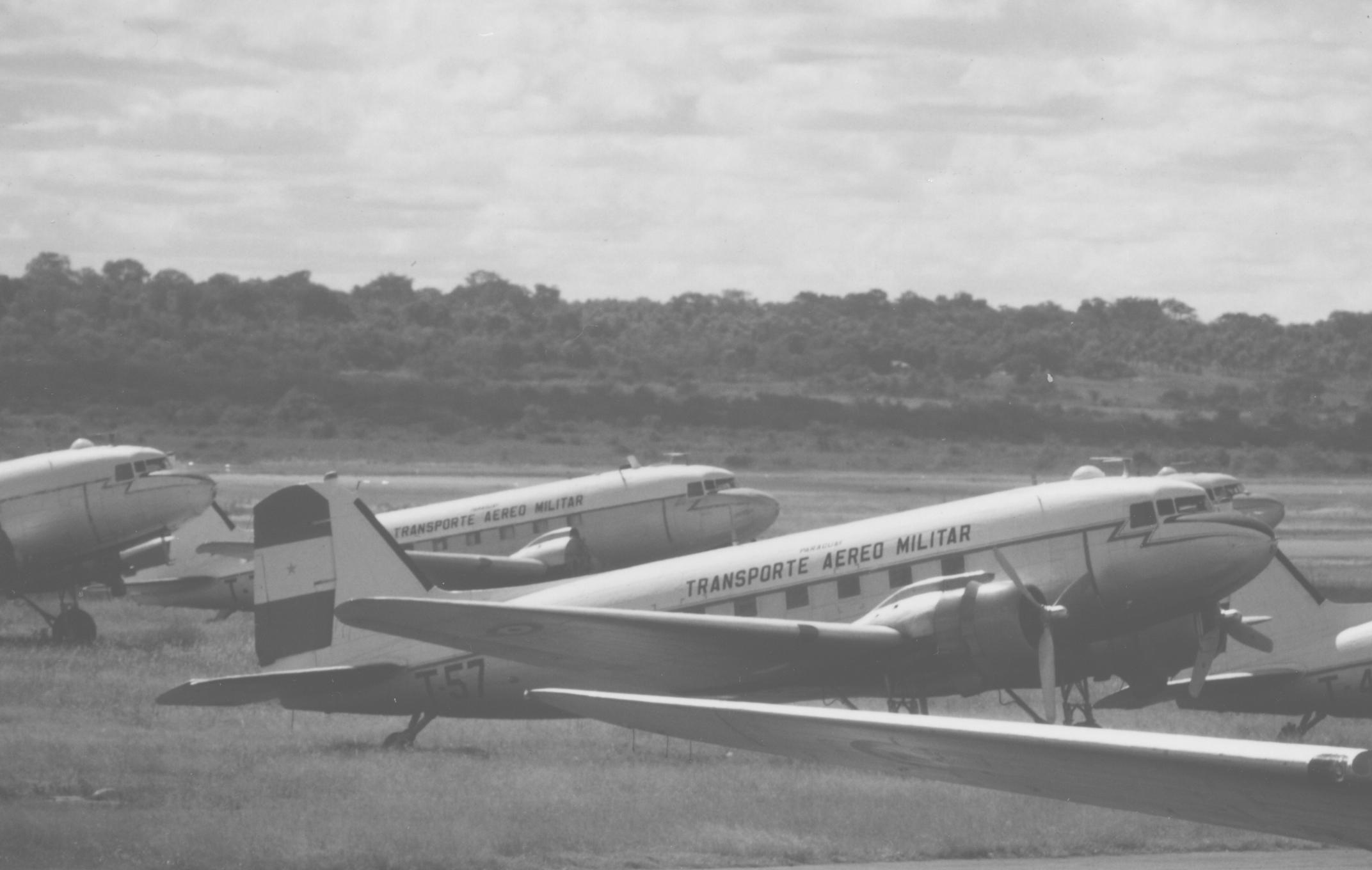
Douglas C-47Bs of Paraguay's TAM (military-run passenger service)

27 August
Douglas C-47B FAP2016 of TAM - Transporte Aéreo Militar crashed in Paraguay on approach to Silvio Pettirossi International Airport, Asunción. One person was killed. The aircraft was on a flight to Juan de Ayolas Airport when an engine failed shortly after take-off and the decision was made to land back at Asunción.

Douglas DC-3 HP-210 of the Panamanian Air Force was damaged while parked at Panama's Tocumen International Airport; it was hit by the wing of a Boeing 707 (registration CP-1365) of Lloyd Aéreo Boliviano.

10 September
Douglas C-47 HK-329 of Aeronorte Colombia crashed at Puerto Olaya in Colombia after a wing separated in flight, killing all three people on board. The aircraft was on a cargo flight from Ernesto Cortissoz International Airport, Barranquilla to El Dorado International Airport, Bogotá.

12 September
In the Bahamas, Douglas DC-3A N75KW of Florida Commuter Airlines, with 34 people on board, crashed in the sea 6.4 nautical miles (11.9 km) off West End, Grand Bahama; there were no survivors. The aircraft was on an international non-scheduled passenger flight from Palm Beach International Airport in the United States to Grand Bahama International Airport. Although the cause of the accident was never determined, it is known that the aircraft flew into a thunderstorm and that there were pre-existing deficiencies with the pitot tube and static system on the aircraft. Florida Commuter Airlines was subsequently criticized for its poor maintenance regime.

3 October
Douglas DC-3 ECT-025, a former Ejército del Aire aircraft, disappeared on a flight from Cuatro Vientos Airport in the Spanish capital Madrid to Perpignan - Rivesaltes Airport in France. The aircraft had been purchased by Kirfiss Aviation and was on the first stage of a ferry flight to Germany where it was destined for a museum. The aircraft is presumed to have crashed into the Mediterranean Sea, killing both crew.

3 November
Douglas C-47B TG-BAC of Aero Express crashed near Flores in Guatemala, killing all seven people on board.

13 November
Douglas DC-3 FAC-1311 of SATENA was damaged beyond repair at Subchoque in Colombia.

27 November
Douglas C-47A HK-1221G of the Dirección General de Aduanas (the agency of the Colombian government responsible for Customs) flew into a mountain in Colombia near Medellín at an altitude of 9,500 feet (2,900 m) on a flight to Enrique Olaya Herrera Airport, Medellín. All 15 people on board were killed.

18 December
Douglas C-47A R3711 of the Zimbabwe Air Force crashed at Marandellas in Zimbabwe.

27 December
In Iceland, Douglas C-47B N54605 of Visionair International was damaged beyond repair at Reykjavík Airport during a storm.

== 1981 ==
11 January
Douglas C-47A ET-AGW of Ethiopian Airlines was damaged beyond repair when the port undercarriage collapsed on landing at Bahir Dar Airport in Ethiopia.

28 January
Douglas C-47A PP-ZNU of Sudene crashed at Petrolina Airport in Brazil.

2 March
Douglas C-47B HK-2497 of LANSA was substantially damaged in a forced landing at Anapoima in Colombia, following a double engine failure. The aircraft was later repaired and returned to service, only to be written off in an accident at La Vanguardia Airport, Villavicencio on 30 March 1996.

16 March
Douglas C-47A C-FIRW of Air Inuit was damaged beyond repair when it broke through the frozen surface of Canada's Lac Bienville whilst taxiing for take-off on a cargo flight.

2 April
In Mexico, Douglas C-47A N258M of Sky Train Air was written off in an accident while taxiing at Veracruz International Airport in Veracruz.

6 April
Douglas C-47A CP-1470 of Urcupina crashed at Laguna Soliz in Bolivia, killing all seven people on board.

21 April
Douglas C-53 F-BJBY of Hemet Exploration disappeared with four people on board 15 nautical miles (28 km) off Puerto de Andraitx on the Spanish island of Majorca, while crossing the Mediterranean Sea on an international non-scheduled passenger flight from Oran Es Sénia Airport, Algeria to Toulouse-Blagnac Airport, France.

28 April
In Indonesia, Douglas C-47A PK-OBK of Airfast Indonesia crashed on approach to Simpang Tiga Airport, Pekanbaru, on a non-scheduled passenger flight. Nine of the seventeen people on board were killed.

9 May
Douglas C-47 N60705 of Sky Train Air crashed at Vicente Guerrero in Mexico.

17 June
Douglas C-47A HK-1078 of Taxi Aéreo El Venado ditched into a lake near Miraflores Airport in Colombia following an overshoot with an engine shut down. Two of the twelve people on board were killed.

24 June
In the United States, Douglas DC-3 N18949 of Nathaniel Hawthorne College crashed shortly after take-off from Hawthorne-Feather Airpark, Deering, New Hampshire while on a ferry flight to Melbourne International Airport, Florida. The pilot, who was seriously injured in the crash, had attempted to take-off with insufficient airspeed for flight.

25 June
Douglas C-47 FAC-1129 of SATENA was damaged beyond repair in an accident in Colombia. The aircraft was subsequently withdrawn from use and stored at La Vanguardia Airport, Villavicencio.

1 July
In the United States, Douglas R4D N111ST of United Aircraft Services crashed shortly after take-off from Pilot Point Airport in Alaska while on a flight to Anchorage International Airport, following the failure of the port engine. All three people on board were killed. The aircraft was on a cargo flight laden with fish.

25 July
In Colombia, Douglas C-53D HK-772 of Transamazonica crashed on approach to Carurú Airport, Caruru while trying to perform an emergency landing with the starboard engine shut down. Four of the nine people on board were killed.

1 August
Douglas C-47B F-BJHC of Hemet Exploration was shot down by a surface-to-air missile near Beira, Mozambique when it was mistaken for a hostile aircraft whilst following instructions from air traffic control. All six people on board were killed. The Mozambique authorities initially tried to cover up the mistake, merely posting the aircraft as "missing". It was admitted later that the aircraft had been shot down.

7 August
In Chile, Douglas C-47B CC-CBW of Aerolíneas Cordillera crashed near Teniente Vidal Airport, Coyhaique.

27 August
Douglas C-47B ET-AGX of the United Nations Ethiopian Relief and Rehabilitation Commission was written off at Aba Tenna Dejazmach Yilma International Airport in Ethiopia when the port undercarriage collapsed on landing.

7 October
In Ethiopia, Douglas C-47A ET-AHR of Ethiopian Airlines was damaged beyond economic repair at Combolcha Airport, Dessie when the undercarriage collapsed on landing. The aircraft was completely destroyed two months later, when a Mil Mi-24 helicopter crashed into it.
1981 (unknown date)
Early in the year, Douglas C-47B 5N-ARA of Arax Airlines was damaged beyond repair in an accident at Lagos Airport in Nigeria and was subsequently reduced to spares.

== 1982 ==
21 January
In the United States, Douglas DC-3A N211TA of Tursair was substantially damaged in an accident at Opa-locka Airport, Florida. The aircraft was on a training flight and the trainee pilot mishandled the engine controls, causing a temporary loss of power. The aircraft ran off the runway and collided with a tree. Inadequate supervision and the failure of the student pilot to relinquish control of the aircraft to the instructor were cited as contributing to the accident.

9 February
In the Philippines, Douglas C-47A RP-C141 of Trans Air Services flew into Mount Ipao, Panay Island on a domestic non-scheduled passenger flight from Manila International Airport to Sicogon Airport, Carles. Both crew and one of the thirty-two passengers were killed.

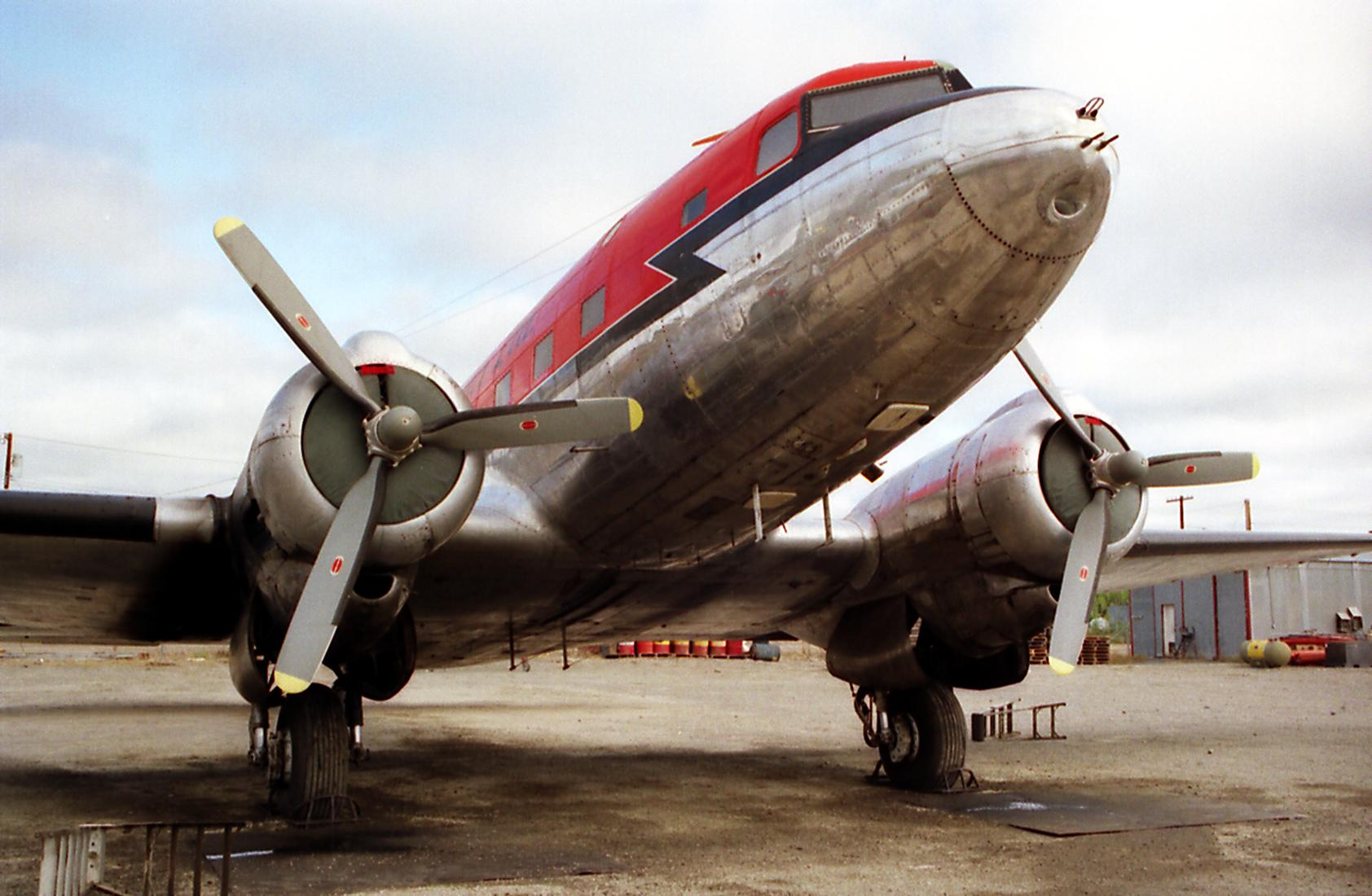
A DC-3 of Kenn Borek Air

7 May
Douglas C-47A C-FQHF of Kenn Borek Air overran the runway at Calgary International Airport in Canada following an aborted take-off. The aircraft was damaged beyond economic repair. The aircraft was subsequently purchased by Buffalo Airways and moved to Hay River, North West Territories for use as a spares source.

6 June
Douglas C-47A N95C of Fromhagen Aviation was written off in the United States when the starboard engine failed on take-off from St. Petersburg-Clearwater International Airport, Florida on a training flight. All five people on board survived.

20 July
In the United States, Douglas C-47D N102BL of Pronto Aviation Services was damaged beyond repair in a crash landing near El Paso International Airport, Texas following an engine failure shortly after take-off. The aircraft was on a domestic non-scheduled passenger flight to Tucson International Airport, Arizona when the engine failed and the decision was made to return to El Paso. A single engine go-around was attempted following an unsafe landing gear warning.

22 August
Douglas DC-3 ET-AHP of Ethiopian Airlines was damaged beyond repair in a take-off accident at Alula Aba Airport in Ethiopia.

15 September
A Douglas C-47 (c/n 6108, formerly registered VH-SBO), stored in the open at Bankstown Airport in Sydney, Australia was damaged when the pilot of a light aircraft committed suicide by deliberately crashing it nearby. The C-47 was never repaired and was subsequently transferred to the airport fire dump.

27 September
In the United Kingdom, Douglas C-47 G-AKNB of Harvest Air was damaged beyond economic repair in an accident at Blackpool Airport, Lancashire. The aircraft was later sold to the United States and re-registered N95NA. As of July 1995, it was stored at Plattsburgh International Airport in the state of New York. The aircraft was subsequently restored to flying condition, and as of October 2007 was with BGA Aviation, Bennettsville, South Carolina, United States as N459NA.

12 October
Douglas C-47A ZS-EJK of Comair was written off in South Africa, when it crashed into a mountain near Graskop, 36 nautical miles (67 km) from Hoedspruit when attempting to divert to that airport whilst flying in instrument meteorological conditions. All 30 people on board survived.
5 December
In the United States, privately owned Douglas C-53 N163E was damaged beyond repair in a taxiing accident at Hollywood-Burbank Airport in California. The aircraft's fuselage was later used as a restaurant in Las Vegas, Nevada.

12 December
In Colombia, Douglas C-47A HK-2580 of Transportes Aéreas Latinamericas crashed at Santiago Vila Airport, Girardot while on a training flight destined to land at Mariquita Airport. One of the four people on board was killed.

1982 (unknown date)
In the Philippines, Douglas C-47B RP-C3 of Bangko Sentral ng Pilipinas (the central bank of the Philippines) was damaged beyond repair in an accident at Manila International Airport.

== 1983 ==
16 January
In the United States, Douglas DC-3 TG-SAB was damaged beyond repair when it crash-landed on a beach at Bay City, Texas. The aircraft was being used to smuggle marijuana when it struck the beach, resulting in a propeller being torn off.

15 February
Douglas DC-3 C-FBKX of Ontario Central Airlines was damaged beyond repair in Canada during a forced landing at Shamathawa, New Brunswick. The overloaded aircraft was unable to maintain flight following an engine failure while on a non-scheduled passenger flight; all four people on board survived. As of July 2009, the hulk of the aircraft remains on site at 55°58.18′N 92°31.65′W.

18 March
Douglas C-47E FAP-356 of the Fuerza Aérea del Perú was damaged beyond repair in an accident at Arequipa Airport in Peru.

3 May
In Colombia, Douglas C-47B FAC-1126 of SATENA was damaged beyond repair in an accident at Palmaseca Airport, Cali.

22 June
Douglas C-47A C-GUBT of Skycraft Air Transport crashed in Canada on approach to Toronto International Airport, at the end of an international cargo flight from Cleveland-Hopkins International Airport, Ohio. Both crew were killed.

19 July
Douglas C-47A N480F of Chevron Oil crashed in Sudan, shortly after take-off from Khartoum International Airport on a non-scheduled passenger flight. Both engines had failed, probably due to contaminated fuel. All 27 people on board survived.

9 August
In Thailand, Douglas VC-47B L2-30/07/641 of the Royal Thai Air Force crashed on take-off from Ubon Ratchathani AFB on a military flight. All five people on board were killed, along with four on the ground.

31 October
In the United States, Douglas DC-3C N44896 of FBN Flying Service was destroyed by fire at Laredo International Airport, Texas while attempting to take-off on a cargo flight to McAllen-Miller International Airport, Texas. A fire had developed on board the aircraft during the take-off run, and the crew were unable to extinguish it with the equipment available to them.

13 December
In the Philippines, Douglas C-47B RP-C287 of Philair crashed shortly after take-off from Manila International Airport following an engine failure. The aircraft was on a non-scheduled passenger flight. All ten people on board survived.

1983 (unknown date)
In the United States, Douglas DC-3 N401JB of Swift Delivery Air Freight was damaged beyond repair in a storm at an airfield in Honolulu, Hawaii.

== 1984 ==
9 January
In the United States, Douglas C-47B C-GSCA of Skycraft Air Transport crashed on take-off from Lambert-St. Louis International Airport on an international cargo flight to Toronto Pearson International Airport, Canada. Both engines lost power shortly after take-off. It was discovered that the engines failed due to detonation after the aircraft was fuelled with jet fuel instead of avgas. One of the two crew members was killed.

16 January
Douglas C-47 9Q-CYD of Transport Aérien Zairois departed the runway at Kissidougou Airport in Guinea, following an engine failure on take-off. The aircraft was destroyed after dry grass was set on fire when it came into contact with the hot engine. All seventeen people on board escaped uninjured. The aircraft was operating a non-scheduled passenger flight in support of the Dakar Rally.

19 April
Douglas C-47 TI-SAA of Servicios Aéreos Nacionales crashed into Costa Rica's Mount Irazu, killing all four people on board.

11 August
In the United States, Douglas C-47 N70003 of Aviation Enterprises crashed shortly after take-off from Memphis International Airport on a domestic non-scheduled passenger flight to O'Hare International Airport, Chicago. All three people on board were killed. A missing spark plug on the port engine caused a loss of power. Maintenance involving the removal of the spark plugs had been performed the previous day.

15 August
Douglas C-47A PK-OBC of Airfast Indonesia crashed into a mountain near Wamena in Indonesia. Two of the three people on board were killed.

27 August
A Douglas C-47 of the Fuerza Aérea Nicaragua was shot down in Nicaragua near Quilali by forces of the Sandinista National Liberation Front. All ten people on board were killed.

22 September
Douglas C-47A L2-4/90/680 of the Royal Thai Air Force was damaged beyond repair when it departed the runway on landing at Surin Airport in Thailand after a tyre burst.

31 October
Douglas C-47B RP-C138 of Village Airways went missing in the Philippines on a domestic cargo flight from Francisco Bangoy International Airport to Manila International Airport. There were four people on board.

22 November
Douglas C-47A N2204S of Factury Buying Corporation crashed at Salinas Victoria in Mexico.

November (unknown date)
Douglas C-47A F-BYCU of Stellair crashed in Morocco near Tangier following fuel exhaustion.

18 December
A Douglas C-47 of the Royal Thai Navy crashed on take-off from Songkhla Airport in Thailand and was destroyed by fire.

== 1985 ==
4 May
Douglas DC-3C N157U of Perris Valley Paracenter was damaged beyond economic repair when the port engine lost a propeller blade on take-off from Perris Valley Airport in the United States, causing the engine to be torn from its mountings. There were no injuries amongst the two crew and 31 parachutists on board. A mandatory Airworthiness Directive had been issued concerning the propeller, but an investigation found no evidence that it had been complied with.

6 June
Douglas C-53D HK-1340 of LACOL Colombia crashed shortly after take-off from La Vanguardia Airport in Villavicencio, Colombia after the starboard engine failed while the aircraft was on a cargo flight. The aircraft was probably overloaded and it caught fire after crashing into trees. Three of the six people on board were killed.

30 June
In the United States, Douglas C-47B N168Z of Northern Peninsula Fisheries was substantially damaged at King Salmon, Alaska when both engines failed on approach to King Salmon Airport whilst the aircraft was on an executive flight from Homer Airport, Alaska. The cause of the accident was fuel exhaustion. A fuel filler cap was discovered to be missing after the accident. In March 2000, the aircraft was recorded in a derelict condition at El Mirage, California.

10 September
A Douglas DC-3 of Collier County Mosquito Control District crashed at East Naples, Florida in the United States whilst on approach to Naples Municipal Airport following an engine failure. The aircraft was on agricultural duties at the time.

25 December
Douglas C-47 YV-425C of AeroEjecutivos ditched off the Venezuelan coast at Cumaná following a double engine failure.

31 December
Douglas DC-3C N711Y of Century Equipment crashed in the United States at De Kalb, Texas following an inflight fire that started from the cabin heater. The aircraft was on a domestic non-scheduled passenger flight between Guntersville Municipal Airport and Dallas Love Field when a fire broke out in the cabin. Both crew were seriously injured and all seven passengers were killed, including singer Ricky Nelson.

== 1986 ==
19 January
Douglas C-47A C-GNNA of Austin Airways struck a 150 feet (46 m) high Non-directional beacon tower and crashed at Sachigo Lake Airport in the Canadian province of Ontario.

29 January
Douglas DC-3-178 XA-IOR – the tenth DST/DC-3 built – of Aero California crashed at Las Lomitas, Mexico when attempting to divert to Las Lomitas Airport. The aircraft was on a domestic scheduled passenger flight from Villa Constitución Airport, Ciudad Constitución to Los Mochis Airport. All 21 people on board were killed.

8 February
Douglas DC-3 HK-3031 of SAEP Colombia crashed on approach to El Dorado International Airport in Bogotá, Colombia. The port engine had lost power shortly after take-off on a cargo flight to Rondon Airport and the decision was made to return to Bogotá. Although the aircraft was destroyed in the post-impact fire, all five people on board survived.

24 May
A Douglas C-47 of the Madagascar Air Force crashed into a mountain near Antananarivo in Madagascar in poor weather. All 13 people on board were killed.

10 July
Douglas C-47A 7315 of the Zimbabwe Air Force crashed on take-off from Maputo International Airport in Mozambique. All 17 people on board were killed.

29 July
Douglas C-53D N27PR of Borinquen Air crashed into a lagoon on approach to Luis Muñoz Marín International Airport, Carolina, Puerto Rico. The aircraft was on an international cargo flight to Golden Rock Airport, Saint Kitts and Nevis when the starboard engine failed shortly after take-off and the decision was made to return to Carolina. One of the two crew was killed, the other was seriously injured.

28 August
A Douglas C-47 of the Fuerza Aérea Sandinista crashed near Siuma in Nicaragua. The aircraft may have been shot down, both crew were killed.

October (unknown date)
Douglas C-47B A65-114 of the Aircraft Research and Development Unit RAAF crashed-landed following the failure of both engines immediately after taking off from RAAF Base Edinburgh in Australia. After the aircraft touched down back on the runway the left landing gear collapsed, damaging the fuselage. The Dakota never flew again and was donated to the South Australian Aviation Museum, Port Adelaide in 1992, where it remains on display.

== 1987 ==
9 March
Douglas DC-3 N78B of the International Flight Center crashed in Venezuela whilst being used on an illegal flight involving smuggling. All three people on board were killed.

10 March
Douglas C-47A N49454 of Aero Express was shot down in Honduras by a Dassault Super Mystere of the Fuerza Aérea Hondureña whilst on an illegal flight and using the false callsign HK-313. All three people on board were killed when the aircraft crashed near Palamital.

11 May
Douglas C-47B C-FADD of Air Manitoba crashed in Canada near Pickle Lake, Ontario after a structural failure of the port wing. The aircraft was on a domestic cargo flight from Big Trout Lake Airport to Pickle Lake Airport. Both crew were killed.

28 May
In Honduras, A Douglas C-47 of the Fuerza Aérea Hondureña was written off. All twelve people on board were killed.

13 July
In Mexico, Douglas DC-3 N28364 of KDD Aviation was damaged beyond economic repair in a landing accident at Ciudad Camargo Airport, Camargo, Tamaulipas. One person was killed.

28 July
Douglas C-53 N39DT of La Mesa Leasing Inc was damaged beyond economic repair in the United States, when the port engine failed shortly after take-off from Laredo International Airport, Texas on an international cargo flight to Ciudad Camargo Airport, Mexico. The aircraft was overloaded by 3,809 pounds (1,728 kg) and the power from the remaining good engine was insufficient to sustain flight. The aircraft stalled and crashed whilst attempting to make an emergency landing back at Laredo. Both crew survived. A post-accident investigation revealed no problems with the failed engine.

15 August
Douglas DC-3 5Y-DAK of Sunbird Aviation crashed on approach to Kilaguni Airport in Kenya. All 28 people on board survived.

20 September
Douglas C-47 6843 of the South African Air Force was destroyed in a forced landing near Bloemfontein in South Africa following an engine fire. All three people on board survived.

18 November
Douglas C-47B P2-006 of the Papua New Guinea Defence Force was damaged beyond economic repair in an emergency landing shortly after take-off from Lae Nadzab Airport in Papua New Guinea. An engine had lost power and a wing was ripped off in the subsequent belly landing. The wreck was taken to Lae Airfield for stripping of useful parts. The hulk remained at Lae Airfield into the early 1990s.

8 December
In Bolivia, Douglas DC-3 CP-1059 of TASMI was damaged beyond economic repair in a take-off accident at San Ignacio Airfield, San Ignacio de Moxos.

1987 (unknown date)
A Douglas C-47B of the Fuerza Aérea Paraguaya was written off in an accident at Bahia Negra Airport in Paraguay.

Douglas C-47B FAP-2034 of TAM Paraguay crashed at Lagerenza in Paraguay.

== 1988 ==
8 February
In Thailand, Douglas AC-47 L2-34/13 of the Royal Thai Air Force was damaged beyond economic repair in a landing accident at Dong Muang AFB. The aircraft was subsequently preserved at Don Mueang International Airport.

12 April
Douglas DC-3C ZS-UAS of United Air suffered an in flight fire in South Africa and crashed at Hennenman, Orange Free State killing all 24 people on board. The aircraft was on a domestic scheduled passenger flight from Bloemfontein Airport to Johannesburg International Airport.

21 April
Douglas C-47A N47FE of African Air Carriers was damaged beyond economic repair in a take-off accident at Quelimane Airport in Mozambique. Both crew were killed, one other person on board was seriously injured. The aircraft may have been shot down.

2 May
Douglas C-47A ET-AGT of Ethiopian Airlines was destroyed on the ground at Axum Airport in Ethiopia, during an attack on the airport by Mikoyan-Gurevich MiG-23s of the Ethiopian Air Force.

30 August
In Colombia, Douglas AC-47 Spooky FAC-1650 of the 214th Tactical Squadron, Fuerza Aérea Colombiana was damaged beyond economic repair in an accident.

20 September
Douglas C-47A Z-WRJ of Crest Breeders crashed shortly after take-off from Zimbabwe's Harare International Airport following a loss of power from the starboard engine. The aircraft was on a cargo flight; all three crew survived.

1 November
Douglas C-47A C-FBJE of Air Ontario crashed into Pikangikum Lake in Canada on a domestic cargo flight from Red Lake Airport to Pikangikum Airport. Two of the three people on board were killed.

== 1989 ==
17 January
Douglas C-47A CP-1418 of Aerolíneas La Paz disappeared near La Paz, Bolivia whilst on a domestic non-scheduled passenger flight from El Alto International Airport to Apolo Airport.

18 January
In the United States, Douglas DC-3 XB-DYP crashed shortly after take-off from Laredo International Airport, Texas. The aircraft was on an international cargo flight to Torreón International Airport, Mexico. The cause of the accident was that the cargo was improperly secured and shifted in flight, causing the centre of gravity to move aft.

28 February
Douglas C-47A C-FBZN of Transfair crashed near La Grande-LG-4 airstrip in the Canadian province of Quebec, following an engine failure. The crankshaft of the engine broke between the two rows of cylinders, creating circumstances that made it very difficult for the crew to recognize that the engine had failed. The aircraft was on a cargo flight destined to land at Lac Bienville.

1 March
Douglas C-49J N28PR of Borinquen Air ditched on approach to Luis Muñoz Marín International Airport, Carolina, Puerto Rico following a failure of the port engine. Although the landing gear was retracted, the crew did not feather the propeller. This resulted in increased drag which made flight impossible. The aircraft was on an international cargo flight from Golden Rock Airport, Saint Kitts and Nevis.

2 May
In the United States, Douglas C-47A N28889 of Monroe County Mosquito Control District crashed at Summerland Key, Florida after striking mangrove trees whilst spraying. The aircraft was operating out of Marathon Flight Strip at the time. Both crew were killed.

6 May
Douglas C-47A RP-C82 of Manila Aero Transport System crashed on take-off from Manila International Airport in the Philippines following an engine failure. The aircraft was being used on a domestic non-scheduled passenger flight although it was not licensed to carry passengers. All 18 people on board survived.

21 May
Douglas C-47A C-GWYX of Central Mountain Air Services made a forced landing at Bronson Creek in Canada following an in-flight engine fire. The aircraft was subsequently destroyed by the fire but both crew escaped. The aircraft was on an international cargo flight from Wrangell Airport, Alaska to Bronson Creek Airport.

22 May
Douglas C-47A N47CE of Condor Enterprise crashed in the United States at Waterman, Illinois, 5 miles (8.0 km) from DeKalb Airport, Illinois whilst on a training flight from Sugar Grove Airport to Chicago Rockford International Airport. All three crew were killed, including pilot Karen Ulane.

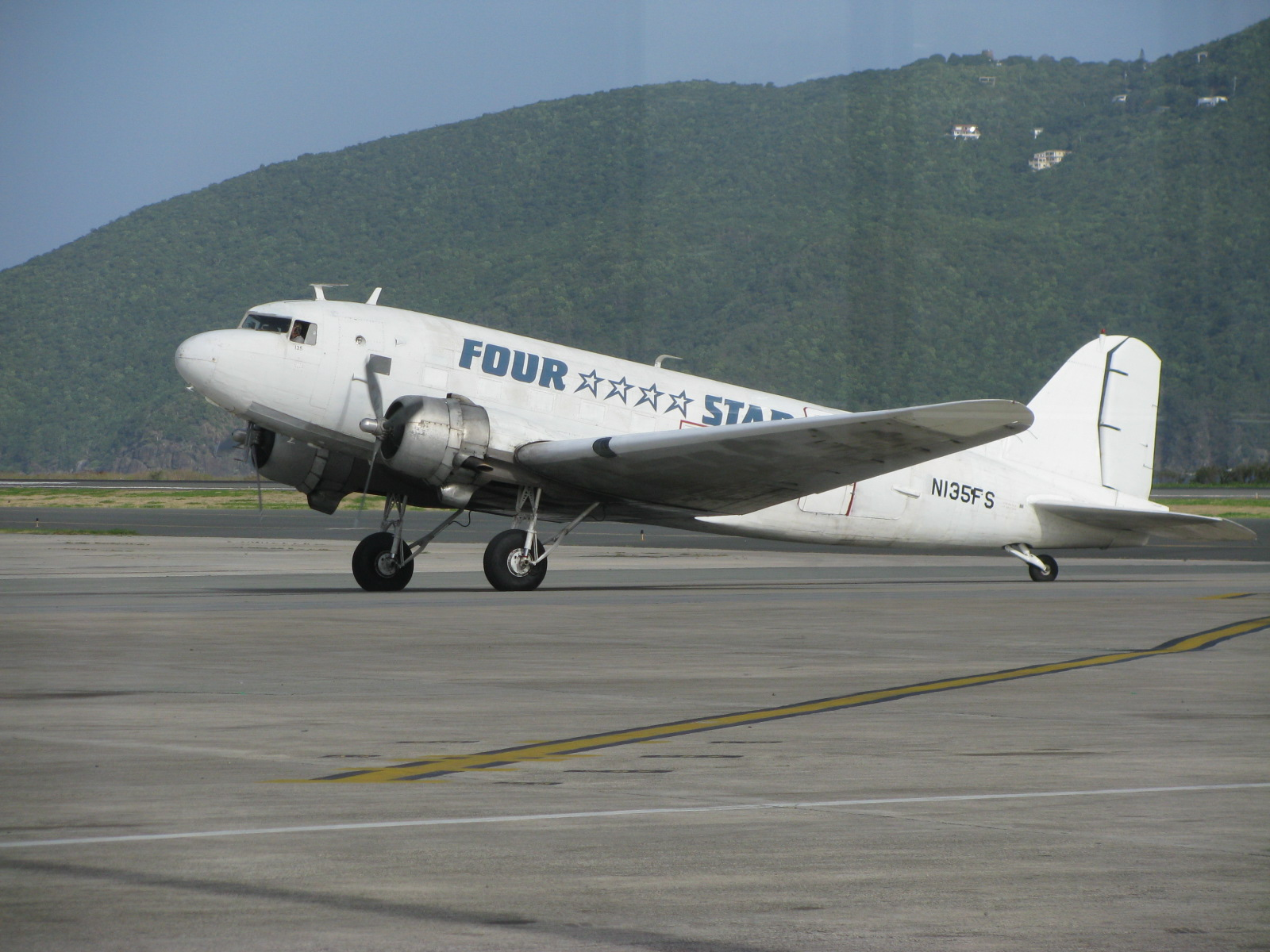
Four Star Air Cargo C-47

26 June
In the United States, Douglas C-47A N8042X of California Air Tours ditched 5 miles (8.0 km) off Petersburg, Alaska following the loss of fabric from an aileron and the breaking of the chain connecting the left control wheel to the aileron control system; and the pilots' subsequent incorrect assessment of the degree of controllability of the aircraft. The aircraft was on a ferry flight from Petersburg Municipal Airport to Ketchikan International Airport. On 6 July 1989 the aircraft was salvaged with the intention of returning it to airworthiness, but this was not carried out. In 2000, the hulk was reported to have been sold for restoration and placement on a pedestal at Juneau International Airport. As of 2005, the hulk was still at Petersburg.

17 September
Douglas DC-3 N4425N, Douglas C-47s N100SD, N4471J and N4577Z; and Douglas C-49J N28346 of Aero Virgin Islands; along with Douglas C-47A N101AP of Four Star Air Cargo; were damaged beyond economic repair at Cyril E. King Airport, Charlotte Amalie, United States Virgin Islands by Hurricane Hugo.

Douglas C-47A N100DW of Tol Air Services was damaged beyond economic repair at Luis Muñoz Marín International Airport in Carolina, Puerto Rico by Hurricane Hugo.

19 November
Douglas DC-3C RP-C14 of Victoria Air Inc. ditched 100 metres (110 yd) off Barualite in the Philippines. The aircraft was on a scheduled passenger flight at the time. All five people on board survived.

== See also ==
- List of accidents and incidents involving the DC-3 in the 1930s
- List of accidents and incidents involving the DC-3 in the 1990s
- List of accidents and incidents involving the DC-3 since 2000
- List of accidents and incidents involving the DC-3

== Notes ==
^Note A Military versions of the DC-3 were known as C-47 Skytrain, C-48, C-49, C-50, C-51, C-52, C-53 Skytrooper, C-68, C-84, C-117 Super Dakota and YC-129 by the United States Army Air Forces and as the R4D by the United States Navy. In Royal Air Force (and other British Commonwealth air forces') service, these aircraft were known as Dakotas.
