= 2019 Laser Aéreo Douglas DC-3 crash =

Aviation accident in Colombia

2019 Colombia DC-3 crash
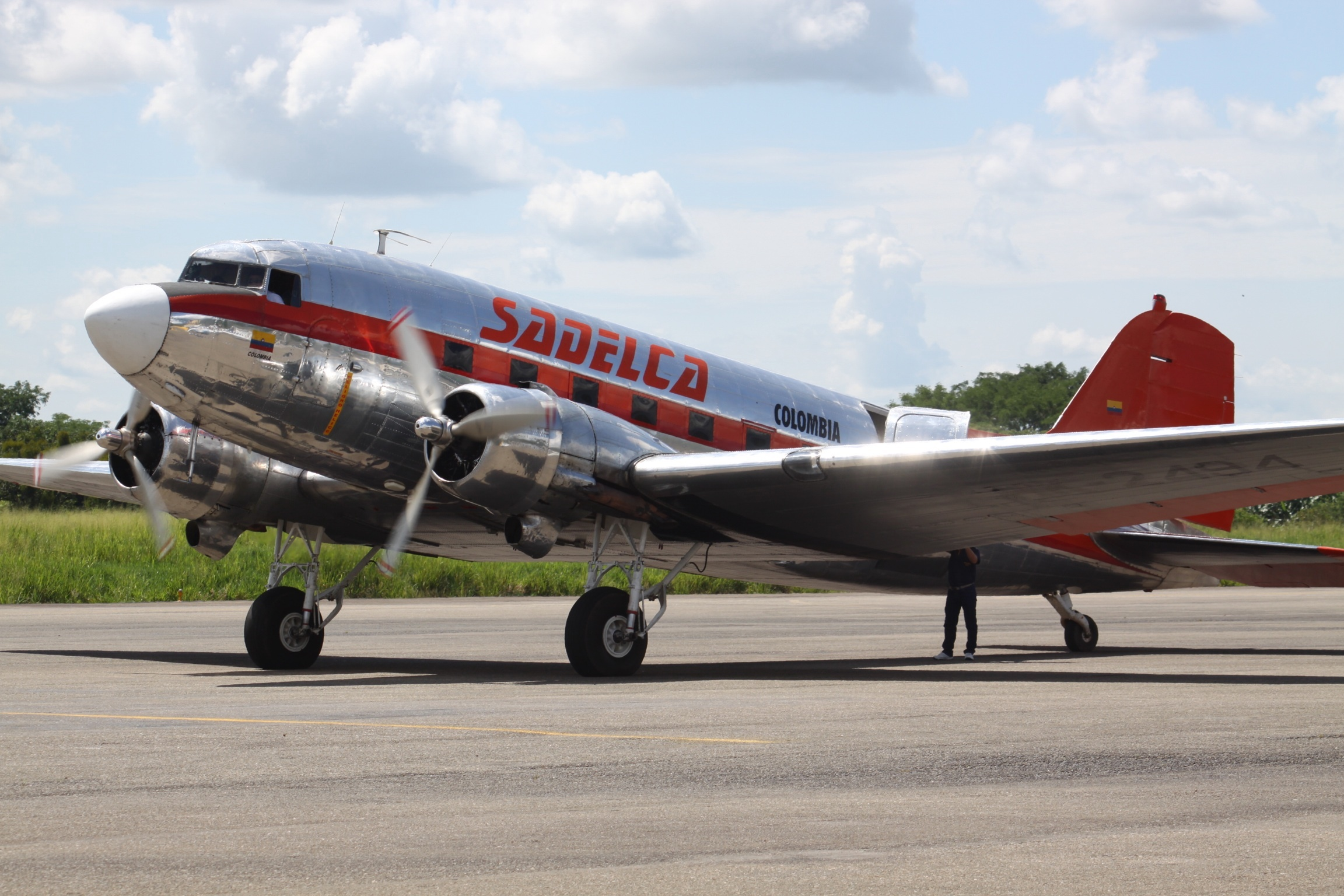
- HK-2494, the aircraft involved, seen in July 2012

Accident
- Date: 9 March 2019
- Summary: Crashed onto ground after one of the engines could not be feathered due to mechanical failure and inadequate maintenance
- Site: Finca La Bendición, San Martín, Meta, Colombia; 3°34′23.3″N 73°04′43.2″W

Aircraft
- Aircraft type: Douglas DC-3
- Operator: Latinoamericana de Servicios Aéreo
- Registration: HK-2494
- Flight origin: Jorge Enrique González Torres Airport, San José del Guaviare, Colombia
- Destination: La Vanguardia Airport, Villavicencio, Colombia
- Occupants: 14
- Passengers: 11
- Crew: 3
- Fatalities: 14
- Survivors: 0

On 9 March 2019, a Douglas DC-3 operated by Latinoamericana de Servicios Aéreo (Laser Aéreo) crashed near San Carlos de Guaroa, Colombia. The plane was on a flight from Jorge Enrique González Torres Airport, San José del Guaviare to La Vanguardia Airport, Villavicencio. All 14 people on board were killed, including the mayor of Taraira. The crew were attempting to land at Villavicencio and had just declared an emergency.

== Aircraft ==
The Aeronautica Civil reports that the aircraft, registered HK-2494, was built in 1945, for the United States Army Air Force (USAAF) as a Douglas TC-47B-DK (USAAF 44-76773 / MSN 16357 / 33105), and converted to a Douglas R4D-7 (USN Bureau Number 99826) for the United States Navy on 14 May 1945. Re-designated as a Douglas TC-47K in 1962, it was transferred to the University of Texas at Austin on 8 Oct 1971 with civil registration N87611.

== Crash ==
As the aircraft was cruising, the left engine suffered a failure, which disabled the oil system in that engine. The crew then radioed in a mayday and diverted to La Rinconada, a plantation. While they were descending, the crew could not feather the engine which was required in an engine failure, thus they began to lose speed as the engine windmilled, creating drag. At 10:31 am local time, the crew made their final transmission, stating they had the runway in sight. Ground witnesses in the area said they saw the aircraft doing several turns while descending. The aircraft then crashed near a road, coming to rest just over the road, on fire. Plantation workers rushed to help, but they found no survivors.

== See also ==
- List of accidents and incidents involving the DC-3 since 2000
