= San Carlos de Guaroa =

- Municipality and town
- Flag Coat of arms

- Location of the municipality and town of San Carlos de Guaroa in the Meta Department of Colombia.
- Coordinates: 3°42′40″N 73°14′33″W
- Country: Colombia
- Department: Meta Department

Area
  - Total: 814 km^{2} (314 sq mi)
- Elevation: 350 m (1,150 ft)

Population (Census 2018)
  - Total: 11,512
- Time zone: UTC-5 (Colombia Standard Time)
- Climate: Am
- Website: http://www.sancarlosdeguaroa-meta.gov.co

San Carlos de Guaroa (Spanish pronunciation: [saŋˈkaɾlos ɣwaˈɾoa]) is a town and municipality in the Meta Department, Colombia.

== Plane crash ==
On 9 March 2019, a Douglas DC-3 operated by Latinoamericana de Servicios Aéreo (Laser Aéreo) crashed near the town. The plane was on a flight from Jorge Enrique González Torres Airport, San José del Guaviare to La Vanguardia Airport, Villavicencio. All 14 people on board were killed, including the mayor of Taraira. The crew were attempting to land at Villavicencio and had just declared an emergency.
