= Aerovanguardia =

Colombian airline, 1993–2007

Aerovias Vanguardia
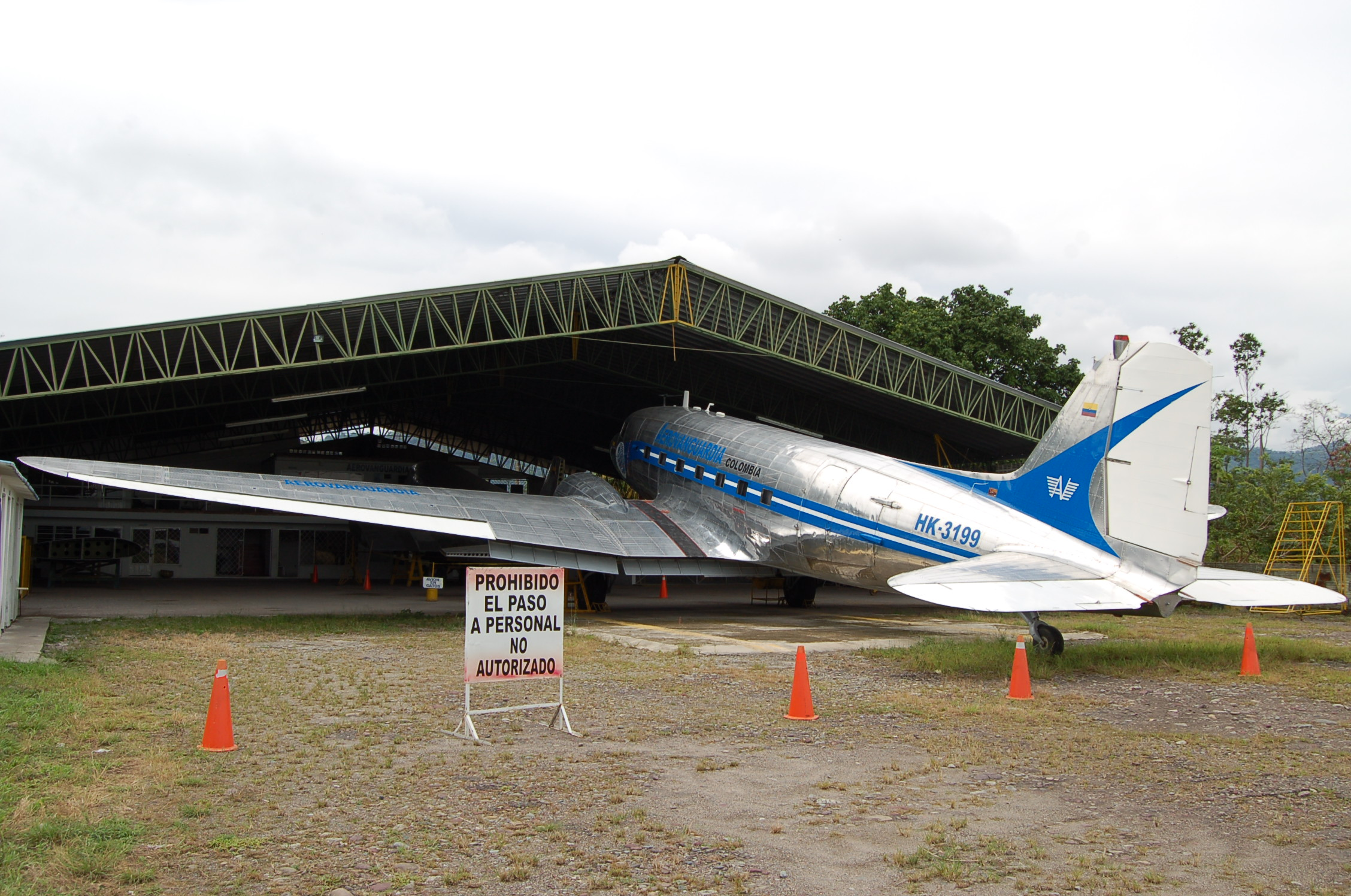
- Founded: 1993
- Commenced operations: 1999
- Ceased operations: 2007
- Hubs: La Vanguardia Airport
- Fleet size: 6
- Headquarters: Villavicencio Vanguardia (VVC)

Aerovanguardia was an airline founded in 1993 in Colombia. The company had a total of 6 airplanes in the entirety of its history. The company out of all 6 of those airplanes, crashed 3 of them in Colombia. When the company became bankrupt because of its airplanes getting destroyed, it sold 2 of its airplanes to Aliansa and ADES. The only surviving two aircraft were stored at La Vanguardia Airport. Then the company went bankrupt in 2007.

== See also ==
- La Vanguardia Airport
- List of airlines of Colombia
- List of defunct airlines of Colombia
