= La Macarena Airport =

La Macarena Airport El Refugio Airport
- IATA: LMC; ICAO: SKNA; LID: SK-307

Summary
- Airport type: Public
- Serves: La Macarena, Colombia
- Elevation AMSL: 777 ft / 237 m
- Coordinates: 2°10′25″N 73°47′10″W

Map
- Location of the airport in Colombia

Runways
Direction	Length		Surface
Direction	m	ft	Surface
17/35	1,580	5,184	Asphalt
- Sources: GCM Google Maps

La Macarena Airport, also known as El Refugio Airport, (IATA: LMC, ICAO: SKNA) is an airport serving the Guayabero River town of La Macarena in the Meta Department of Colombia.

== Airlines and destinations ==
Airlines	Destinations
SARPA	Charter: Bogotá
SATENA	Bogotá, Villavicencio

== See also ==
- Transport in Colombia
- List of airports in Colombia
