= Jorge Enrique González Torres Airport =

Jorge Enrique González Torres Airport Aeropuerto Jorge Enrique González Torres
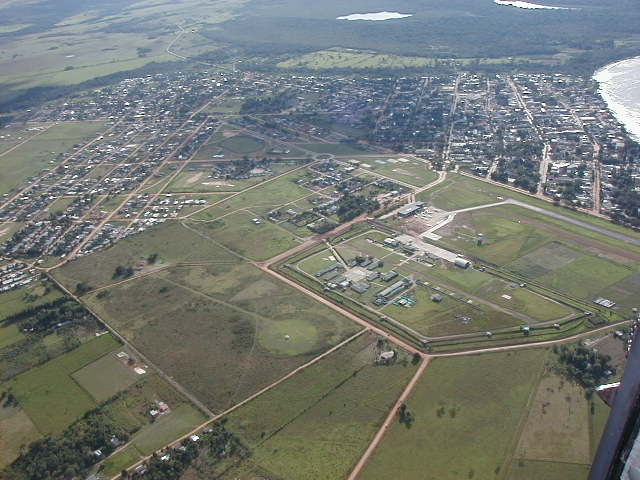
- IATA: SJE; ICAO: SKSJ

Summary
- Airport type: Public
- Serves: San José del Guaviare, Colombia
- Elevation AMSL: 613 ft / 187 m
- Coordinates: 2°34′45″N 72°38′22″W

Map
- Location of the airport in Colombia

Runways
Direction	Length		Surface
Direction	m	ft	Surface
01/19	1,500	4,921	Asphalt
- Sources: GCM

Jorge Enrique González Torres Airport (Spanish: Aeropuerto Jorge Enrique González Torres) (IATA: SJE, ICAO: SKSJ) is an airport serving San José del Guaviare, the capital of the Guaviare Department of Colombia. The runway is just north of the town and parallels the Guaviare River.

== Airlines and destinations ==
Airlines	Destinations
SATENA	Bogotá, Leticia

== Accidents and incidents ==
- On 9 March 2019, Douglas DC-3 HK-2494 of LASER Aéro Colombia crashed en route to La Vanguardia Airport, in Villavicencio, killing all 14 occupants.

== See also ==
- Transport in Colombia
- List of airports in Colombia
