= Roblex Aviation =

Cargo airline based in Puerto Rico

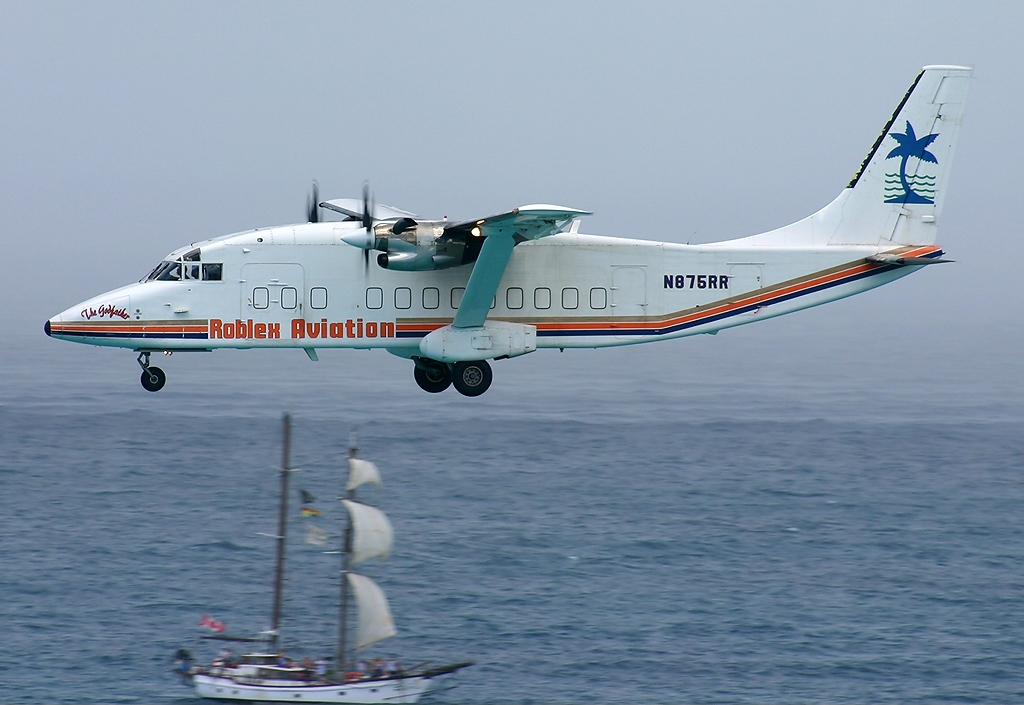
IATA	ICAO	Call sign
-	-	-
- Commenced operations: 1997; 29 years ago
- Ceased operations: 2011; 15 years ago
- Operating bases: Luis Muñoz Marín International Airport; Rafael Hernandez Airport
- Fleet size: 4
- Headquarters: San Juan, Puerto Rico

Roblex Aviation was a cargo airline based in Puerto Rico. This airline started flying in 1997 throughout the Caribbean and surrounding areas. The airline had two bases in Puerto Rico, one at San Juan's Luis Muñoz Marín International Airport and another at the former Air Force base in Aguadilla, now known as Rafael Hernandez Airport.

== Fleet ==
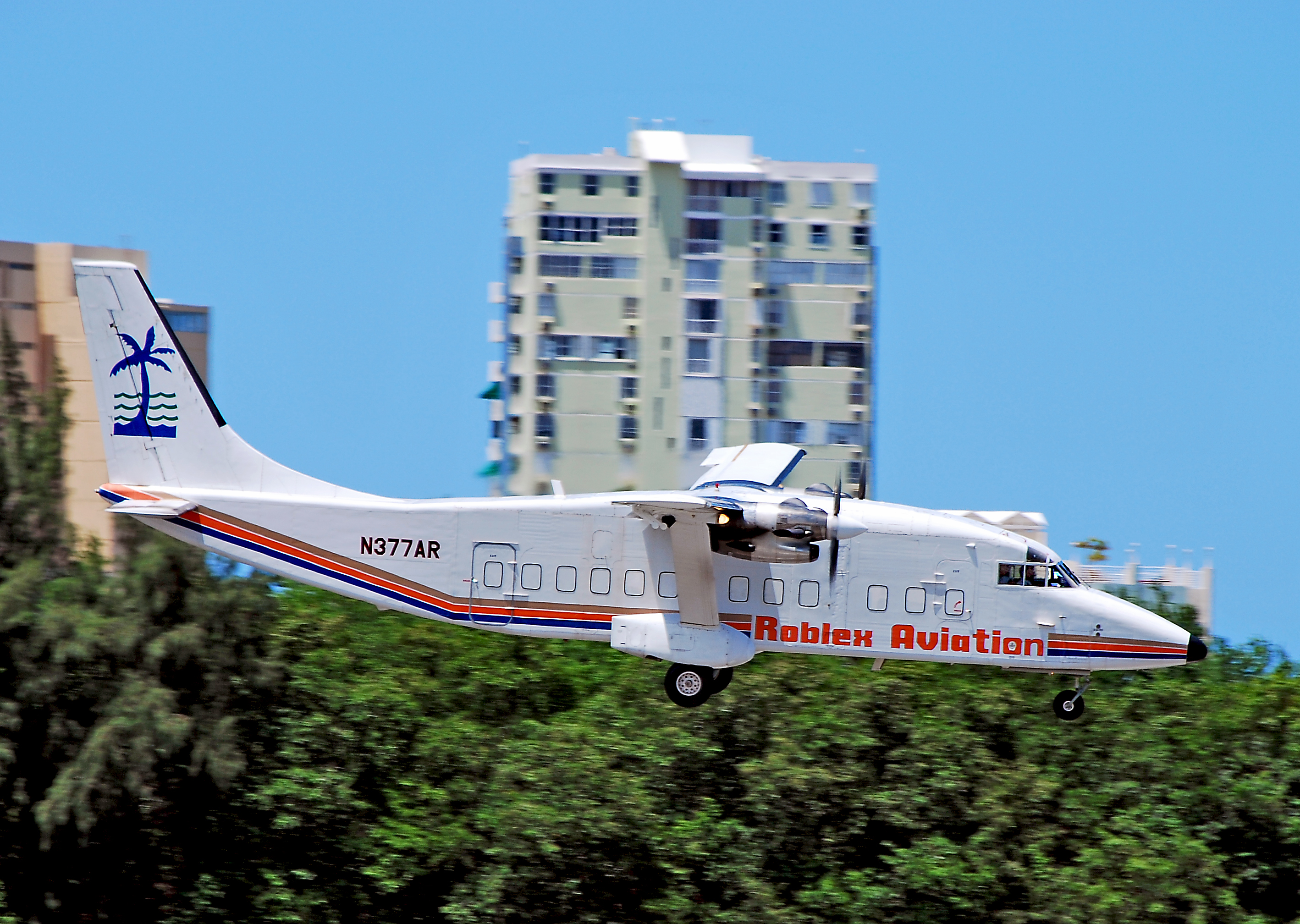
Roblex Short 360 on final approach into Luis Muñoz Marín International Airport (September 2009)

As of July 2013, the Roblex Aviation fleet included the following:

- Douglas DC-3
- 4 Shorts 360-300

== Bankruptcy ==
On January 8, 2011, Roblex Aviation filed for Chapter 11 bankruptcy. As reported by Caribbean Business, Roblex Aviation was one of the top 15 commercial bankruptcy filings in Puerto Rico also filed again in June 2013. Pilots and mechanics are currently fired by the administration since July 13, 2013, as no money is available to continue the operation and fix the last aircraft of the fleet.

== Accidents and incidents ==
On 4 April 2001, Douglas DC-3A N19BA ditched in the sea off Luis Muñoz Marín International Airport, Carolina, Puerto Rico after suffering a double engine failure while on a local training flight. Both crews escaped. Damage to the aircraft was described as minor.
