= Skycraft Air Transport =

Canadian airline

IATA	ICAO	Call sign
SF	SKG	Skycraft
- Commenced operations: 1979
- Ceased operations: 1994
- Operating bases: Oshawa Municipal Airport
- Fleet size: Cessna 150; Cessna 172; Cessna 402; Piper Cheyenne; Beech 18; Embraer 110 Bandeirante; Shorts 330; DC-3
- Headquarters: Oshawa, Ontario, Canada

Skycraft Air Transport Inc. was a Canadian airline based at Oshawa Municipal Airport in Oshawa, Ontario, that operated between 1979 and 1994.

== History ==
Skycraft Air Transport was created as a charter airline targeting the express air freight needs of the North American automotive industry. It was based in Oshawa, Ontario, where its biggest customer, General Motors Canada, operated two large car assembly plants. Its principal competitive advantages were its diverse fleet, with different aircraft that could economically carry different sized loads, and its ability to dispatch aircraft to virtually any North American destination within one hour of a customer request.

By the late 1980s the airline was operating a flying school and had diversified into the air ambulance, passenger charter and scheduled service markets. Its scheduled services included flights from Oshawa Municipal Airport to Ottawa; Montreal; Windsor, Ontario; and Detroit.

The airline was notable for changing the type of aircraft operated on its passenger services to match the number of passengers booked for each flight.

Skycraft's colour scheme consisted of having the lower part of the fuselage painted in white or silver, the middle part painted with the red title of 'Skycraft', and the tail painted in white or silver, with a large letter 'S' in red and the Canadian flag.

Skycraft filed for court protection in 1992. It subsequently obtained new financing and continued operations with a reduced fleet, but the new business plan was not successful. The airline finally shut down operations in February 1994.

== Fleet ==
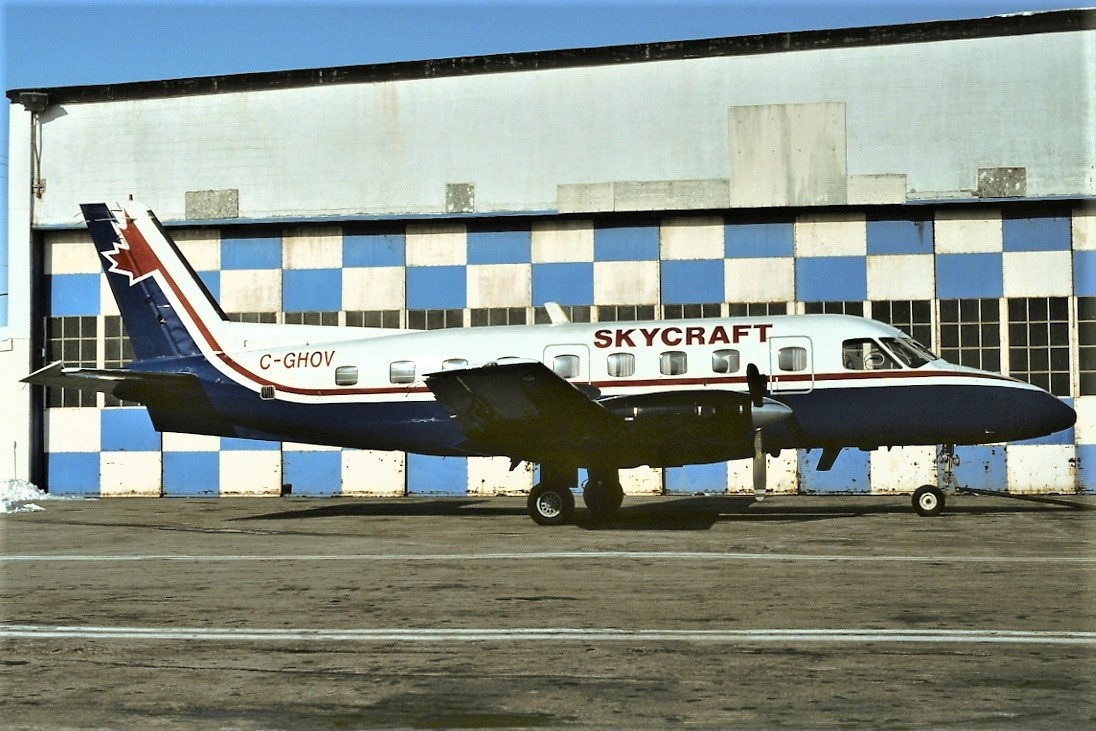
Skycraft Air Transport Embraer Bandeirante

Its fleet consisted of the following 32 aircraft:

- 1 Beechcraft Duchess (Model 76)
- 2 Beechcraft Model 18
- 5 Cessna 150
- 5 Cessna 172
- 1 Cessna 310
- 1 Cessna 402
- 1 Cessna Citation I (500)
- 5 Douglas DC-3
- 4 Embraer EMB 110 Bandeirante
- 1 Piper PA-23 (PA-23-250 Aztec)
- 1 Piper PA-28 Cherokee
- 2 Piper PA-31 Navajo
- 2 Short 330
- 1 Waco F series (YMF)

== Accidents and incidents ==
- On 22 June 1983, a Douglas DC-3, C-GUBT crashed on approach to Toronto International Airport while on an international cargo flight from Cleveland Hopkins International Airport, Ohio. Both crew were killed.
- On 9 January 1984, a Douglas DC-3, C-GSCA crashed on take-off from St. Louis Lambert International Airport on an international cargo flight to Toronto Pearson International Airport, Canada. Both engines lost power shortly after take-off. It was discovered that the aircraft had been fuelled with JET-A instead of 100LL. One of the two crew members was killed.
- On 6 June 1985 Beech 18 C-FFLC on route from Oshawa to Cleveland. One crew member on board was killed when the aircraft was lost in Lake Erie. Weather was not a factor. Cause of accident unknown.

== See also ==
- List of defunct airlines of Canada
