= Tol Air =

Cargo airline based in San Juan, Puerto Rico

IATA	ICAO	Call sign
TI	TOL	Tolair
- Commenced operations: 1983; 43 years ago
- Ceased operations: 2006; 20 years ago
- Operating bases: Luis Muñoz Marín International Airport
- Fleet size: 22
- Destinations: Caribbean
- Key people: Jorge A. Toledo

Tol Air (Tol Air Services Inc.) was a charter and cargo airline based at Luis Muñoz Marín International Airport in San Juan, Puerto Rico. It was established in 1981 and started operations on 16 May 1983. It operated daily cargo charter flights from Puerto Rico to 10 destinations in the Caribbean. In April 2006, Tol Air was purchased by Four Star Air Cargo.

== Code data ==
- IATA Code: TI
- ICAO Code: TOL
- Callsign: Tol Air

== Fleet ==
The Tol Air fleet consisted of the following aircraft:

- 4 Beech E18S
- 3 Cessna 402
- 1 Cessna 208
- 3 Convair 240
- 2 Convair 440
- 2 Douglas C-47 Skytrain
- 5 Douglas DC-3
- 1 Douglas C-54 Skymaster
- 1 Martin 4-0-4
- 1 Swearingen SA226-TC Metro II

== Accidents and incidents ==
- On 30 December 2003, Douglas DC-3C N781T was substantially damaged when the starboard undercarriage collapsed on landing at Cyril E. King Airport, Charlotte Amalie after a flight that originated at San Juan, Puerto Rico.

== See also ==
- List of defunct airlines of the United States
