= Carurú Airport =

Airport in Colombia

Carurú Airport Aeropuerto de Carurú
- IATA: CUO; ICAO: SKCR

Summary
- Airport type: Public
- Serves: Carurú, Colombia
- Elevation AMSL: 820 ft / 250 m
- Coordinates: 1°00′50″N 71°17′50″W

Map
- Location of the airport in Colombia

Runways
Direction	Length		Surface
Direction	m	ft	Surface
12/30	1,250	4,101	Dirt
- Sources: GCM Bing Maps

Carurú Airport (Spanish: Aeropuerto de Carurú)(IATA: CUO, ICAO: SKCR) is an airport serving the river town of Carurú in the Vaupés Department of Colombia.

The runway parallels the Vaupés River, an eventual tributary of the Amazon River.

== See also ==
- Transport in Colombia
- List of airports in Colombia
