= Puerto Gaitán Airport =

- IATA: none; ICAO: SKPG

Summary
- Airport type: Public
- Serves: Puerto Gaitán, Colombia
- Elevation AMSL: 510 ft / 155 m
- Coordinates: 4°18′10″N 72°05′10″W

Map
- Location of the airport in Colombia

Runways
| Direction | Length | | Surface |
| Direction | m | ft | Surface |
|---|---|---|---|
| 05/23 | 1,200 | 3,937 | Gravel |
- Source: GCM Google Maps

Puerto Gaitán Airport (ICAO: SKPG) is an airport serving the river town of Puerto Gaitán in the Meta Department of Colombia.

The airport and town are 7 kilometres (4.3 mi) south of the confluence of the Manacacias River into the Meta River.

== See also ==
- Transport in Colombia
- List of airports in Colombia
