= Borinquen Air =

Charter airline from Puerto Rico

| IATA | ICAO | Call sign |
|---|---|---|
| FD; 3B | BNA | — |
- Founded: 1961
- Operating bases: Luis Muñoz Marín Int'l Airport
- Fleet size: 2
- Destinations: Saint Martin, Culebra, Vieques
- Headquarters: San Juan, Puerto Rico

Borinquen Air, also doing business as Amber Service,Air Puerto Rico or Diaz Aviation, is a charter airline from Puerto Rico, which operates regional passenger and cargo flights. The company was founded in 1961 and is based at Luis Muñoz Marín International Airport.

The airline, which since 1985 has also been in the business of selling aviation fuel, is led by Sixto Diaz Saldaña, a member of the airline's founding family, who is the airline general manager, the sole shareholder and also a licensed attorney.

== Fleet ==
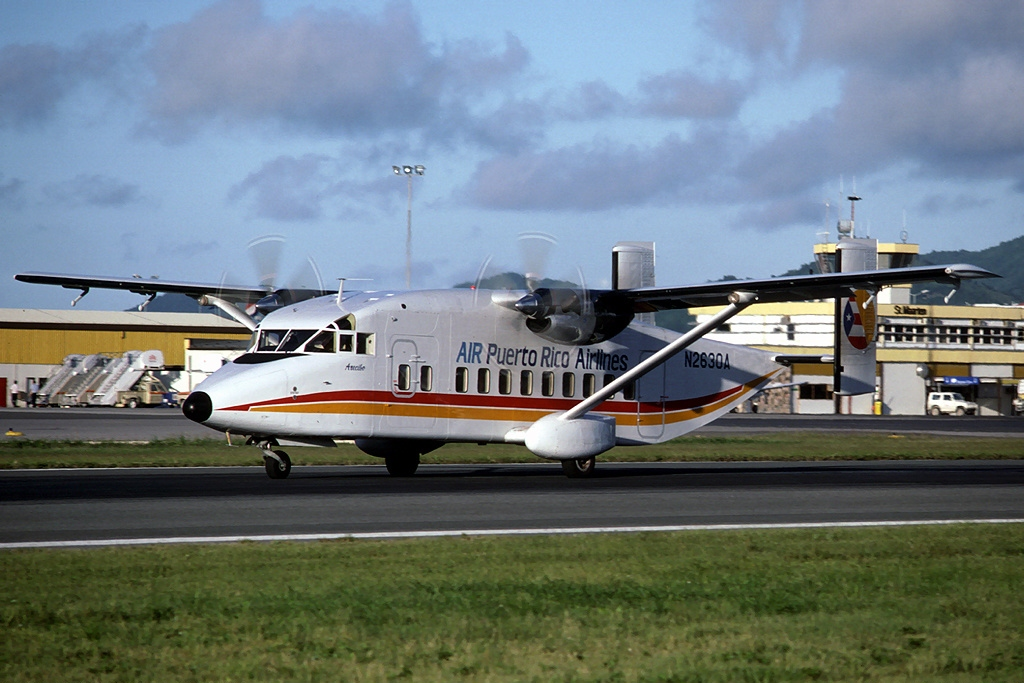
Air Puerto Rico Short 330

As of January 2013, Borinquen Air operated two aircraft: a Beechcraft Model 18, which can accommodate 7 passengers, and a cargo-configured Douglas DC-3. Formerly, airplanes of the types Douglas DC-6, Douglas DC-9, Martin 4-0-4 and Short 330 had been included in the fleet.

=== Delta Ship 41 ===
One of the DC-3s flown by Air Puerto Rico turned out to be a legendary airplane: During 1990, a group of retirees started searching for one of Delta Airlines's five original DC-3 aircraft. Shortly after, they found out that the airplane that had become famous as "Delta Ship 41" was still flying in Puerto Rico, flying cargo for Air Puerto Rico with the registration of N29PR. The plane had been the second DC-3 acquired by Delta. Air Puerto Rico sold the aircraft back to Delta and it was flown to Atlanta in 1993. It is now on exhibit at Delta's Air Transport Heritage Museum.

=== McDonnell Douglas DC-9 ===
During the 1980s Air Puerto Rico operated one McDonnell Douglas DC-9, N931EA. The plane would operate flights from Miami, Montego Bay JA and Santo Domingo DR. The plane was shortly retired from the fleet in 1987.

== Accidents and incidents ==
- On 22 July 1986 at 13:53 local time, a Borinquen Air Douglas DC-3 (registered N27PR) crashed into a lagoon on approach to Luis Muñoz Marín International Airport. The cargo aircraft had been on a flight to Golden Rock Airport, Saint Kitts and Nevis when the starboard engine failed shortly after take-off and the decision was made to return to the departure airport. One of the two pilots on board died in the accident.
- On 1 March 1989, a DC-3, registered N28PR ditched into the sea off Isla Verde, Puerto Rico. The cargo airplane had been on an Diaz Aviation branded flight from Golden Rock Airport to Luis Muñoz Marín International Airport, when the port engine failed during landing approach. Although the landing gear was retracted, the crew did not feather the propeller, which resulted in an increased air drag and thus made further flight maneuvers impossible. There were no fatalities among the two occupants of the airplane.

Fleet
Short 360
Delta Ship 41
McDonnell Douglas DC-9-14

Destinations
Discontinued Destinations
Miami
Santo Domingo
Montego Bay
