= Lake Bienville =

Lake in Quebec, Canada

- Aerial view of Lake Bienville

- Location within Quebec
- Location: Rivière-Koksoak / Baie-James, Quebec
- Coordinates: 55°04′45″N 72°51′40″W
- Basin countries: Canada
- Surface area: 1,047 km^{2} (404 sq mi)
- Surface elevation: 426 m (1,398 ft)

Lake Bienville (French: Lac Bienville; Cree: apišikamîš) is a lake in western central Quebec in Canada. The lake was named after Jean-Baptiste Le Moyne de Bienville, the younger brother of Sieur d'Iberville. The lake has several outlets, draining both east into Ungava Bay and west into Little Whale River, and into Great Whale River, which flows through this lake on its way to Hudson Bay.

Lake Bienville is on the southern edge of the subarctic climate zone. The lake has an area of 1015 km^{2}. Freshwater seals have been reported living in the lake, and wood caribou roam around its shores.

A proposed hydroelectric project, James Bay II, would result in the flooding of the land around the lake.

On 16 March 1981, an Air Inuit Douglas C-47 Skytrain, C-FIRW, was damaged beyond repair when it broke through the frozen surface of the lake while taxiing for take-off on a cargo flight.
