= Viarco =

Portuguese pencil manufacturer

Viarco - Indústria de Lápis, Lda.
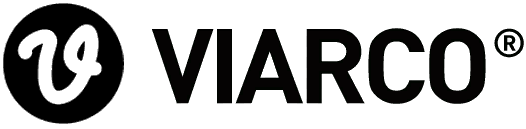
- Formerly: Vila Fé, Cacheux & Cª (1907–31); Vieira Araújo & Companhia, Lda (1931–70s); Viarco – Indústria de Lápis, Lda (1970s–present)
- Company type: Lda.
- Industry: art materials
- Founded: 1907; 119 years ago
- Founder: Conselheiro Figueiredo Faria; Jules Cacheux
- Headquarters: São João da Madeira, Portugal
- Key people: Manoel Vieira Araújo
- Products: Pencils, putties and watercolor graphites, colored pencils, crayons, paints, accessories
- Website: viarco.pt

Viarco - Indústria de Lápis, Lda. is a Portuguese manufacturing company based in São João da Madeira. Founded in 1907, Viarco is not only the oldest but the only pencil manufacturer in Portugal, having also remained as a family business.

Current products by Viarco include goods made of graphite (such as pencils, putties and watercolor), plus other art materials (colored pencils, crayons, paints).

== History ==
The origin of pencil manufacture in Portugal dates back to 1907. Counselor Figueiredo Faria and his French partner and engineer Jules Cacheux make the decision to build an industrial pencil-making unit in Vila do Conde called "Vila Fé, Cacheux & Cª", also known as Portugália.

However, despite Portugália's success, its economic activity was greatly affected by Portugal's entry into World War I beyond the Great Depression from 1929 to 1931.

In 1931, Manoel Vieira de Araújo, an experienced industrialist in the headwear area and a notable entrepreneur from São João da Madeira, with the aim of expanding the company, acquires the factory Portugália. Portugália was, to date, the only Portuguese pencil factory. In 1936, the "Viarco" brand (an acronym for "Vieira Araújo & Companhia, Lda.) was registered.

As a family-owned company, The management of it was taken over by Antonio Vieira Araújo, one of Manoel's sons. The objectives were to stimulate and renew the pencil-making industry. Thus, the early years of the Viarco factory were dedicated to research, application of forms, renovation of facilities and improvement of production methods, in order to develop the manufacture of existing products as well as to extend the diversity of the manufacture of material.

In 1941, the factory facilities are moved from Vila do Conde, Porto to São João da Madeira, which was also the location of the headquarters of the company Vieira Araújo & Cª, Lda. Many employees of the Vila do Conde factory also made the decision to move to the new location of the industry.

By the 1970s, the factory became a limited liability company and was renamed to "Viarco – Indústria de Lápis, Lda".

== Products ==
Apart from conventional products, Viarco manufactures some of its own creations, sold under the "ArtGraf" name. Those original goods include the "Nº 1", a soft graphite putty that allows users to shape the drawing tool according to their specific needs; the "Notebook", a rigid case similar to the homonymous electronic device, but containing a graphite art set inside.

The company also makes personalized pencils for companies, museums and retail shops, and has also released some vintage collections of pencils.

Type	Products
Graphite (ArtGraf series)	Graphite pencils, soft graphite putties, watercolor graphites, graphite sticks, art set cases
Art materials	Colored pencils, crayons, paints
Accessories	Bags, pencil cases
