= Carurú =

- Municipality and town
- Flag Coat of arms

- Location of the municipality and town of Carurú in Vaupés, Colombia

- Location in Colombia
- Coordinates: 1°00′48″N 71°18′00″W
- Country: Colombia
- Department: Vaupés
- Erected: 7 August 1993

Area
  - Municipality and town: 6,982 km^{2} (2,696 sq mi)
- Elevation: 194 m (636 ft)

Population (2015)
  - Municipality and town: 3,327
  - Density: 0.4765/km^{2} (1.234/sq mi)
  - Urban: 635
- Time zone: UTC-5 (Colombia Standard Time)

Carurú (Cubeo: Najod̶a) is a town and municipality located in the department of Vaupés, Colombia. The town is on the north bank of the Vaupés River in the Amazon natural region of the country.

== Transport ==
The town is served by the Carurú Airport and there are no road connections to the rest of the country, the only waterway is the Vaupés River.
