= La Vanguardia Airport =

Vanguardia Airport Aeropuerto Vanguardia
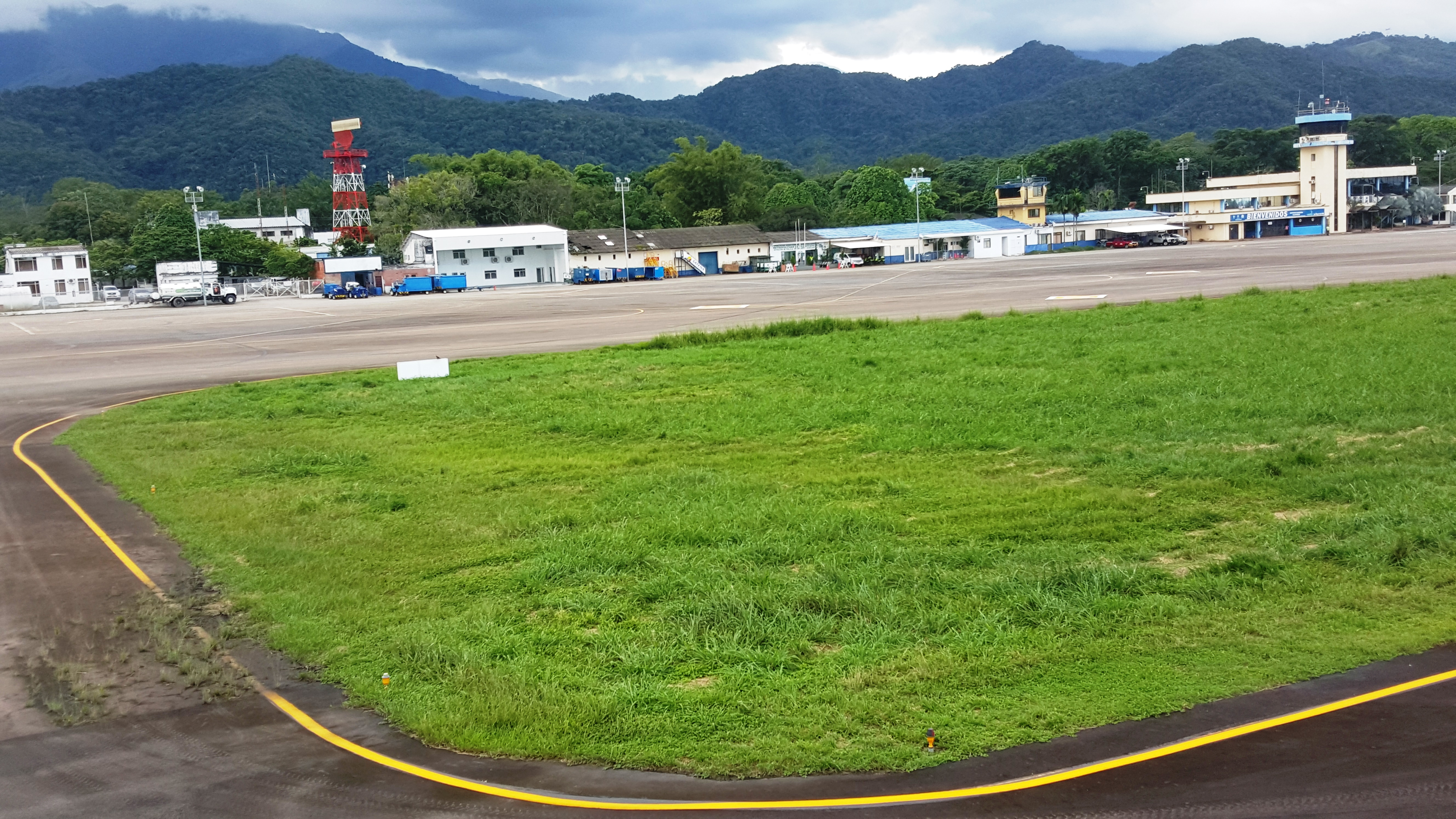
- IATA: VVC; ICAO: SKVV

Summary
- Airport type: Public
- Owner: Aerocivil
- Serves: Villavicencio
- Location: Villavicencio, Colombia
- Elevation AMSL: 1,394 ft (425 m)
- Coordinates: 4°10′05″N 73°36′50″W

Map
- Location of airport in Colombia

Runways
Direction	Length		Surface
Direction	m	ft	Surface
05/23	1,940	6,365	Asphalt
- Sources: GCM Google Maps

La Vanguardia Airport (IATA: VVC, ICAO: SKVV) is an airport serving the city of Villavicencio in the Meta Department of Colombia. It serves regular passenger, charter and cargo airlines as well as private sectors. The airport is just north of the city.

== Airlines and destinations ==
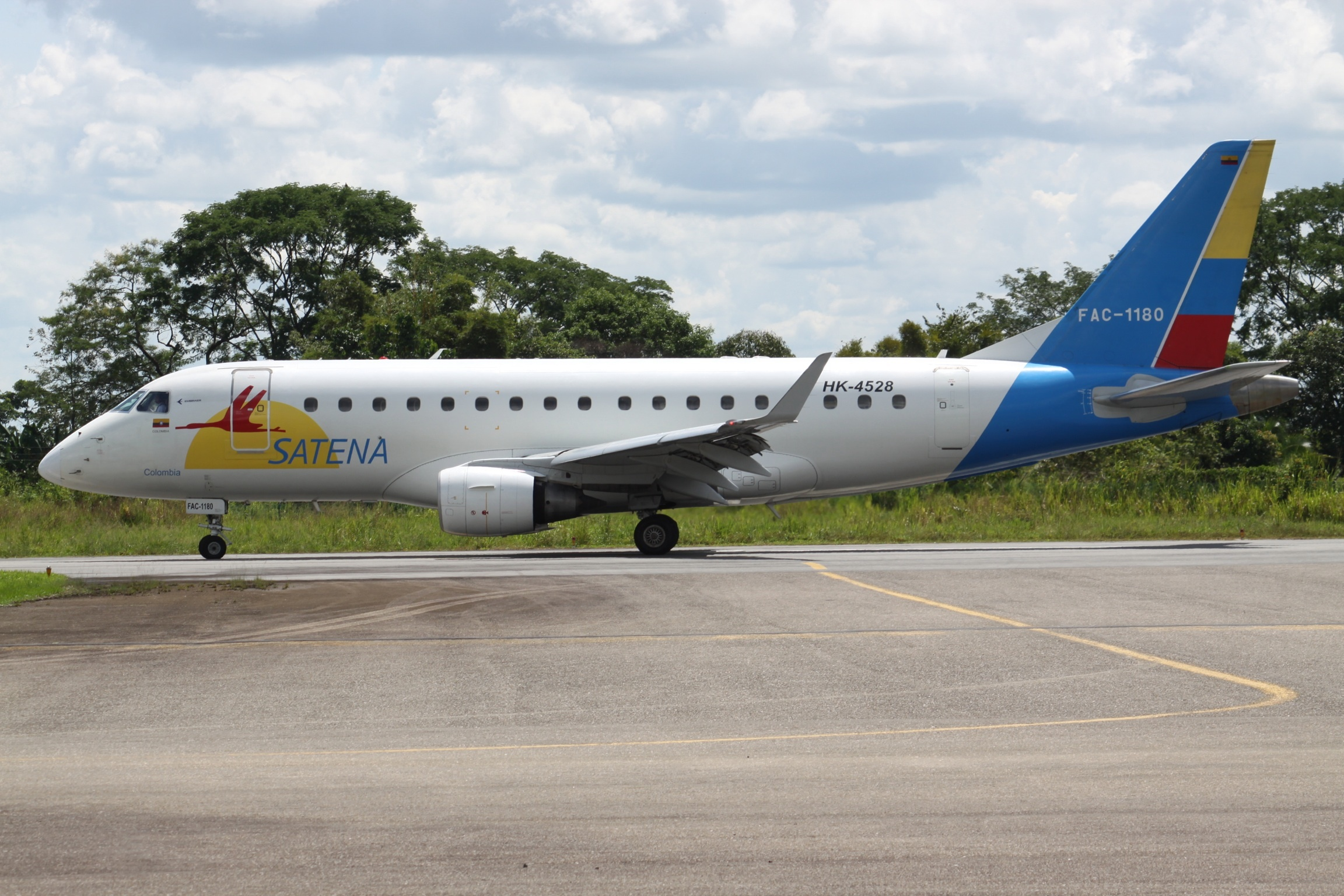
SATENA Embraer 170 at La Vanguardia Airport (July 2012)

Airlines	Destinations
Avianca Express	Bogotá
Clic	Cali, Medellin–Olaya Herrera
SATENA	Arauca, Bogotá, La Macarena, Mitú, Puerto Carreño, Puerto Inírida

== Accidents and incidents ==
- On 6 June 1985, Douglas C-53D HK-1340 of LACOL Colombia crashed shortly after take-off after the starboard engine failed while the aircraft was on a cargo flight. The aircraft was probably overloaded and it caught fire after crashing into trees. Three of the six people on board were killed.
- On 28 May 1994, Douglas C-53D HK-2213 of Transoriente Colombia crashed near Villavicencio after both engines failed shortly after take-off from La Vanguardia Airport on a scheduled passenger flight. Seven of the 29 people on board were killed.
- On 30 March 1996, Douglas C-47B HK-2497 of LANC Colombia was damaged beyond repair in a wheels-up landing on approach to La Vanguardia. The aircraft was on a domestic scheduled passenger flight to La Macarena Airport when an engine problem was encountered and the decision was made to return to La Vanguardia.
- On July 9, 2000, a private Curtiss C-46 HK-851-P, crashed near the airport after take off, when the engine number 2 failed due to fire. 10 of 19 people on board were killed including the Captain and First Officer. There were 9 survivors.
- On 3 November 2010, an explosion took place at the airport warehouse. No casualties were reported. The explosion was caused by a parcel. As a result, several airlines suspended flights from the airport.
- On 9 March 2019, Douglas DC-3 HK-2494 of LASER Aéro Colombia crashed en route from Jorge Enrique González Torres Airport, in San José del Guaviare, killing all 14 occupants.
- On July 10, 2021, a DC-3 of Aliansa, registered as HK2830, crashed into a mountain minutes after take-off. All three occupants were killed.

== See also ==
- Transport in Colombia
- List of airports in Colombia
