= Four Star Air Cargo =

Cargo airline based in San Juan, Puerto Rico

IATA	ICAO	Call sign
HK	FSC	FOUR STAR
- Founded: 1982; 44 years ago
- Ceased operations: 2009; 17 years ago
- Hubs: Luis Muñoz Marín International Airport
- Secondary hubs: STT
- Fleet size: 6
- Parent company: Four Star Aviation Inc
- Headquarters: San Juan, Puerto Rico
- Key people: Stuart Diamond; CEO; Chris Gaertner, co-owner; Charlie Self, director of operations; Tim Jackson, chief pilot; Hiram Maldonado, director of maintenance.; Juan Sanchez, Director of Cargo Operations; Ahsiya Shiffrin; HR
- Website: no more available

Four Star Air Cargo was a cargo airline based in San Juan, Puerto Rico. It operated cargo services within the U.S. and British Virgin Islands and to Puerto Rico. Its main base was Luis Muñoz Marín International Airport.

== History ==
The airline was established and started operations on January 1, 1982 in Saint Thomas, the United States Virgin Islands but it later moved its offices to San Juan, Puerto Rico.

Four Star Air Cargo was wholly owned by Four Star Aviation Inc.

Four Star Air Cargo ceased operation in December 2009.

== Destinations ==
Four Star Air Cargo operated weekly to the following destinations from San Juan, PR:

- Cyril E. King Airport, St. Thomas, U.S. Virgin Islands
- Henry E. Rohlsen Airport, Saint Croix, U.S. Virgin Islands
- Terrance B. Lettsome International Airport, Tortola

== Fleet ==
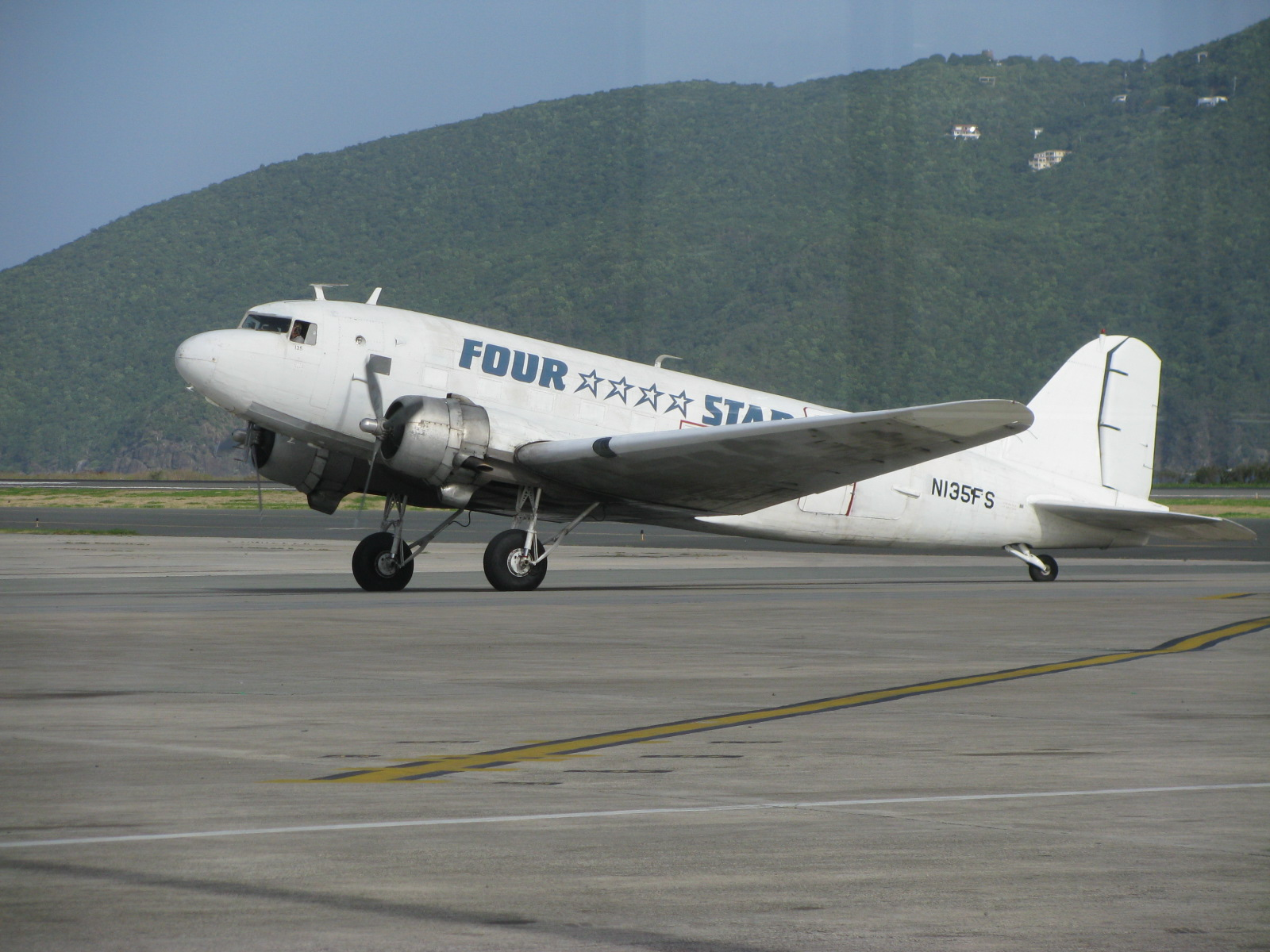
N135FS

The Four Star Air Cargo fleet consisted of the following aircraft (as of July 2008):

- 6x Douglas DC-3: N131FS, N132FS, N133FS, N135FS, N136FS and N138FS Snoopy. N136FS was written off in April 2009 due to a cockpit fire.

== Accidents and incidents ==
- On 17 September 1989, Douglas C-47A N101AP was damaged beyond economic repair at Cyril E. King Airport, Charlotte Amalie by Hurricane Hugo.
- On May 10, 1991, Douglas R4D-7 N134FS was damaged beyond repair when it crashed shortly after take-off from Rafael Hernández Airport, Aguadilla, Puerto Rico following an engine failure and stall. Both crew were killed. The aircraft was on a cargo flight to Mercedita Airport, Ponce.
- On April 26, 2009 Douglas DC-3C N136FS was damaged beyond repair when a fire broke out in the cockpit at Luis Muñoz Marín International Airport, Carolina, Puerto Rico. The aircraft was taxiing for take-off on a mail flight to Cyril E. King Airport, Charlotte Amalie, United States Virgin Islands.

== See also ==
- List of defunct airlines of the United States
