= San José del Guaviare =

- Municipality and town
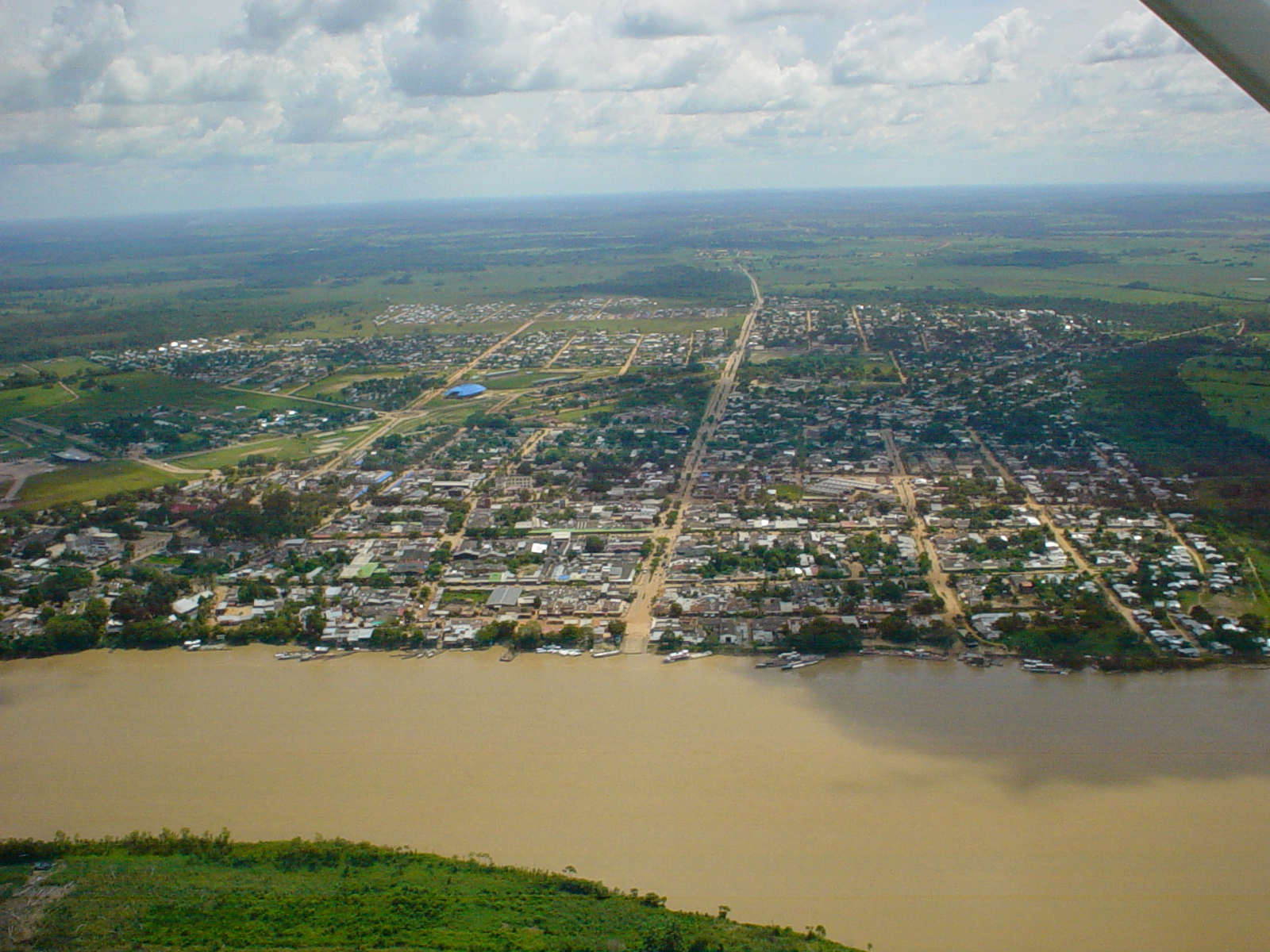
- Aerial view of San José del Guaviare

- Flag Coat of arms

- Location of the municipality and town of San José del Guaviare in the Guaviare Department of Colombia.

- Location in Colombia
- Coordinates: 2°34′N 72°38′W
- Country: Colombia
- Region: Amazon Region
- Department: Guaviare Department
- Founded: 1960

Government
  - Mayor: Ramón Rojas Guevara

Area
  - Municipality and town: 16,769 km^{2} (6,475 sq mi)
  - Urban: 6.17 km^{2} (2.38 sq mi)
- Elevation: 185 m (607 ft)

Population (2018 census)
  - Municipality and town: 52,815
  - Density: 3.1496/km^{2} (8.1573/sq mi)
  - Urban: 36,254
  - Urban density: 5,880/km^{2} (15,200/sq mi)
- Demonym: Guaviarenses
- Time zone: UTC-05 (Colombia Standard Time)
- Postal code: 950001-9
- Area code: 57 + 9
- Climate: Am
- Website: Official website (in Spanish)

San José del Guaviare (Spanish pronunciation: [saŋ xoˈse ðel ɣwaˈβja.ɾe]) is a town and municipality in Colombia, capital of the department of Guaviare by the Guaviare River. It is home to some of the deisolated Nunak people.

== Climate ==
Climate data for San José del Guaviare, elevation 165 m (541 ft), (1981–2010)
Month	Jan	Feb	Mar	Apr	May	Jun	Jul	Aug	Sep	Oct	Nov	Dec	Year
Mean daily maximum °C (°F)	33.4 (92.1)	33.5 (92.3)	32.9 (91.2)	31.5 (88.7)	30.7 (87.3)	29.9 (85.8)	29.7 (85.5)	30.6 (87.1)	31.5 (88.7)	31.6 (88.9)	31.5 (88.7)	32.2 (90.0)	31.6 (88.9)
Daily mean °C (°F)	26.3 (79.3)	26.7 (80.1)	26.4 (79.5)	25.9 (78.6)	25.4 (77.7)	24.7 (76.5)	24.6 (76.3)	25.1 (77.2)	25.5 (77.9)	25.7 (78.3)	25.8 (78.4)	26.1 (79.0)	25.7 (78.3)
Mean daily minimum °C (°F)	21.2 (70.2)	21.4 (70.5)	21.9 (71.4)	22.4 (72.3)	22.2 (72.0)	21.9 (71.4)	21.5 (70.7)	21.6 (70.9)	21.9 (71.4)	22.2 (72.0)	22.2 (72.0)	21.7 (71.1)	21.8 (71.2)
Average precipitation mm (inches)	44.6 (1.76)	94.0 (3.70)	153.2 (6.03)	319.7 (12.59)	353.6 (13.92)	355.0 (13.98)	334.9 (13.19)	273.1 (10.75)	237.1 (9.33)	235.4 (9.27)	225.0 (8.86)	99.9 (3.93)	2,725.6 (107.31)
Average precipitation days	6	8	13	19	21	24	22	21	17	17	16	10	188
Average relative humidity (%)	80	80	82	87	89	90	89	88	86	86	87	84	86
Mean monthly sunshine hours	189.1	155.3	139.5	120.0	102.3	96.0	114.7	133.3	156.0	155.0	150.0	164.3	1,675.5
Mean daily sunshine hours	6.1	5.5	4.5	4.0	3.3	3.2	3.7	4.3	5.2	5.0	5.0	5.3	4.6
Source: Instituto de Hidrologia Meteorologia y Estudios Ambientales

Climate data for San José del Guaviare (Trueno El), elevation 150 m (490 ft), (1981–2010)
Month	Jan	Feb	Mar	Apr	May	Jun	Jul	Aug	Sep	Oct	Nov	Dec	Year
Mean daily maximum °C (°F)	32.9 (91.2)	33.5 (92.3)	32.7 (90.9)	31.4 (88.5)	30.6 (87.1)	29.8 (85.6)	29.5 (85.1)	30.6 (87.1)	31.5 (88.7)	31.6 (88.9)	31.3 (88.3)	31.6 (88.9)	31.4 (88.5)
Daily mean °C (°F)	26.2 (79.2)	26.4 (79.5)	26.0 (78.8)	25.5 (77.9)	25.0 (77.0)	24.4 (75.9)	24.1 (75.4)	24.5 (76.1)	25.0 (77.0)	25.3 (77.5)	25.3 (77.5)	25.7 (78.3)	25.3 (77.5)
Mean daily minimum °C (°F)	20.8 (69.4)	21.0 (69.8)	21.7 (71.1)	21.8 (71.2)	21.7 (71.1)	21.1 (70.0)	20.8 (69.4)	20.9 (69.6)	21.1 (70.0)	21.4 (70.5)	21.5 (70.7)	21.2 (70.2)	21.2 (70.2)
Average precipitation mm (inches)	58.7 (2.31)	84.1 (3.31)	193.6 (7.62)	308.3 (12.14)	377.2 (14.85)	370.9 (14.60)	350.1 (13.78)	273.1 (10.75)	239.3 (9.42)	278.9 (10.98)	208.6 (8.21)	122.4 (4.82)	2,762.1 (108.74)
Average precipitation days	6	7	14	19	23	24	24	22	19	19	17	11	197
Average relative humidity (%)	79	79	83	89	90	90	90	90	88	87	89	85	87
Mean monthly sunshine hours	182.9	146.8	124.0	102.0	102.3	90.0	105.4	120.9	144.0	145.7	138.0	155.0	1,557
Mean daily sunshine hours	5.9	5.2	4.0	3.4	3.3	3.0	3.4	3.9	4.8	4.7	4.6	5.0	4.3
Source: Instituto de Hidrologia Meteorologia y Estudios Ambientales

== Notable people ==
- Nicolás Rodríguez (born 2004), footballer
- Jhon Solís (born 1999), footballer
