= Granada, Meta =

- Municipality and town
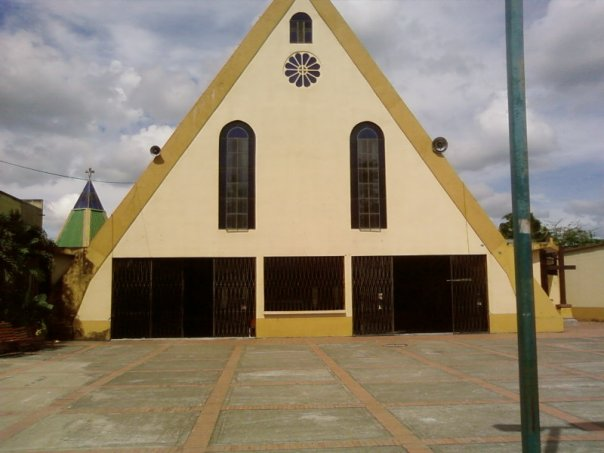

- Flag Coat of arms

- Location of the municipality and town of Granada, Meta in the Meta Department of Colombia.

- Location in Colombia
- Coordinates: 3°32′49″N 73°42′36″W
- Country: Colombia
- Department: Meta Department

Area
  - Municipality and town: 348.3 km^{2} (134.5 sq mi)
  - Urban: 11.3 km^{2} (4.4 sq mi)
- Elevation: 372 m (1,220 ft)

Population (2018 census)
  - Municipality and town: 68,876
  - Density: 197.7/km^{2} (512.2/sq mi)
  - Urban: 58,293
  - Urban density: 5,160/km^{2} (13,400/sq mi)
- Demonym: Granadino
- Time zone: UTC-5 (Colombia Standard Time)
- Area code: 57 + 8
- Climate: Am
- Website: Official website (in Spanish)

Granada is a town and municipality in the Meta Department, Colombia. The municipality has an area of 348.3 square kilometres (134 sq mi) and a population of 68,876. The municipality is located between 3° 26" latitude north and 73° 43" longitude west and between 372 and 410 metres (1,220 and 1,345 ft) above sea level. The daily mean air temperature varies between 24 and 25.6 °C (75.2 and 78.1 °F). Annual rainfall is between 2,400 and 2,800 millimetres (94 and 110 in). The town is connected to Santa Fé de Bogotá along a 180 kilometres (110 miles) road and lies about 80 kilometres or 50 miles from the regional capital Villavicencio.

== Symbols ==
=== Shield ===
The shield is made up of two axes, a symbol of colonization. The first appears in the year 1939, when the population of what is now Granada began. In the second the date 1956, when it was erected as a municipality. A ribbon with the inscription "Land of work for men of peace" connects the two axes. The shield, in the upper part, is divided into three parts, each one with different colors of the flag. First we see the white dove symbolizing peace, in the center the open pomegranate that symbolizes the agricultural variety and finally in the third there are two hands intertwined as a welcome to the visitors. At the bottom is the Guillermo León Valencia bridge.

=== Flag ===
The pavilion has three equal stripes of green, white and red. The green represents agriculture as the main economic line of the region, the white represents the peaceful vocation of its people, and the red represents the blood of the patriots from the plains who gave us freedom.

== History ==
=== Foundation: June 23, 1953 ===
In the municipality of Granada, there were three indigenous cultures: the Guayupe (the largest group), the Sae and the Operigua, who did not have their territory well defined; They only presented language and cultural differences, which were not studied, as they yielded to the pressure of the first European colonizations, promoted by the companies that exploited rubber, cinchona, balata and wood.

Granada, previously called Boquemonte, as it is the entrance to a royal road through the forests of the plain of the Ariari river; lived the same population dynamics as the Orinoquía, a natural region known as the Eastern Plains, made up of the political-administrative divisions corresponding to the departments of Meta, Arauca, Casanare and Vichada.

The Ariari region, whose most important municipality is Granada, began with the population displacement from the Cundiboyacense highlands and Sumapaz in the middle of the last century, and was accentuated between 1950 and 1970 with migrations towards the upper Ariari, made up of the municipalities from Cubarral, Granada, El Castillo, Medellín del Ariari, Fuente de Oro and Lejanías.

On June 23, 1956, Boquemonte changed its name to Nueva Granada; Likewise, on November 19 of the same year, by decree 299, he was elected to the category of municipality.

== Tourism ==
=== Places ===
==== Bridge El Alcaraván ====
The El Alcaraván bridge connects Granada with the municipalities of San Juan de Arama, Vista Hermosa, Mesetas and Uribe.

=== Parties and celebrations ===
==== Summer Festival ====
The summer festival is well known in the region. Every year this festival is celebrated in the month of January, enjoying the shores of the beaches of the Ariari River. Activities in the festival include: campercross, extreme sports, motocross, aerobics, soccer, beach volleyball, reign, mountain bike etc. The traditional event of the festival is the regatta through the Ariari river, where hundreds of people gather to embark on their journey in the waters of the river.

== Economy ==
The economic activities of the municipality are:

- Agricultural production, with crops of irrigated and rainfed rice, corn, banana, African palm, cocoa, cassava, sugar cane, papaya, citrus and passion fruit.

Secondly, the traditional extensive and semi-extensive grazing livestock.

Tourism, fish farming for food and ornamental purposes, and open-air exploitation take place in the town. It is known for its livestock and hosts fairs and festivals featuring exhibitions of paso horses and coleus.

== Climate ==
Climate data for Granada (Holanda La), elevation 360 m (1,180 ft), (1981–2010)
Month	Jan	Feb	Mar	Apr	May	Jun	Jul	Aug	Sep	Oct	Nov	Dec	Year
Mean daily maximum °C (°F)	32.4 (90.3)	32.8 (91.0)	32.0 (89.6)	30.8 (87.4)	30.3 (86.5)	29.6 (85.3)	29.5 (85.1)	30.3 (86.5)	30.9 (87.6)	31.0 (87.8)	30.9 (87.6)	31.3 (88.3)	31.0 (87.8)
Daily mean °C (°F)	26.6 (79.9)	26.9 (80.4)	26.4 (79.5)	25.7 (78.3)	25.3 (77.5)	24.7 (76.5)	24.5 (76.1)	24.8 (76.6)	25.4 (77.7)	25.5 (77.9)	25.6 (78.1)	25.8 (78.4)	25.6 (78.1)
Mean daily minimum °C (°F)	21.2 (70.2)	21.3 (70.3)	21.7 (71.1)	21.7 (71.1)	21.6 (70.9)	21.2 (70.2)	20.8 (69.4)	20.9 (69.6)	21.1 (70.0)	21.4 (70.5)	21.6 (70.9)	21.6 (70.9)	21.3 (70.3)
Average precipitation mm (inches)	31.8 (1.25)	77.5 (3.05)	197.7 (7.78)	344.7 (13.57)	411.4 (16.20)	351.8 (13.85)	292.3 (11.51)	233.4 (9.19)	231.2 (9.10)	276.8 (10.90)	225.3 (8.87)	71.4 (2.81)	2,711.5 (106.75)
Average precipitation days	4	7	13	20	23	22	23	19	16	18	16	7	185
Average relative humidity (%)	74	73	77	82	84	86	85	84	82	83	82	80	81
Mean monthly sunshine hours	198.4	152.4	120.9	108.0	130.2	123.0	127.1	139.5	153.0	161.2	165.0	192.2	1,770.9
Mean daily sunshine hours	6.4	5.4	3.9	3.6	4.2	4.1	4.1	4.5	5.1	5.2	5.5	6.2	4.9
Source: Instituto de Hidrologia Meteorologia y Estudios Ambientales
