= Juan Guillermo Zuluaga =

Colombian politician

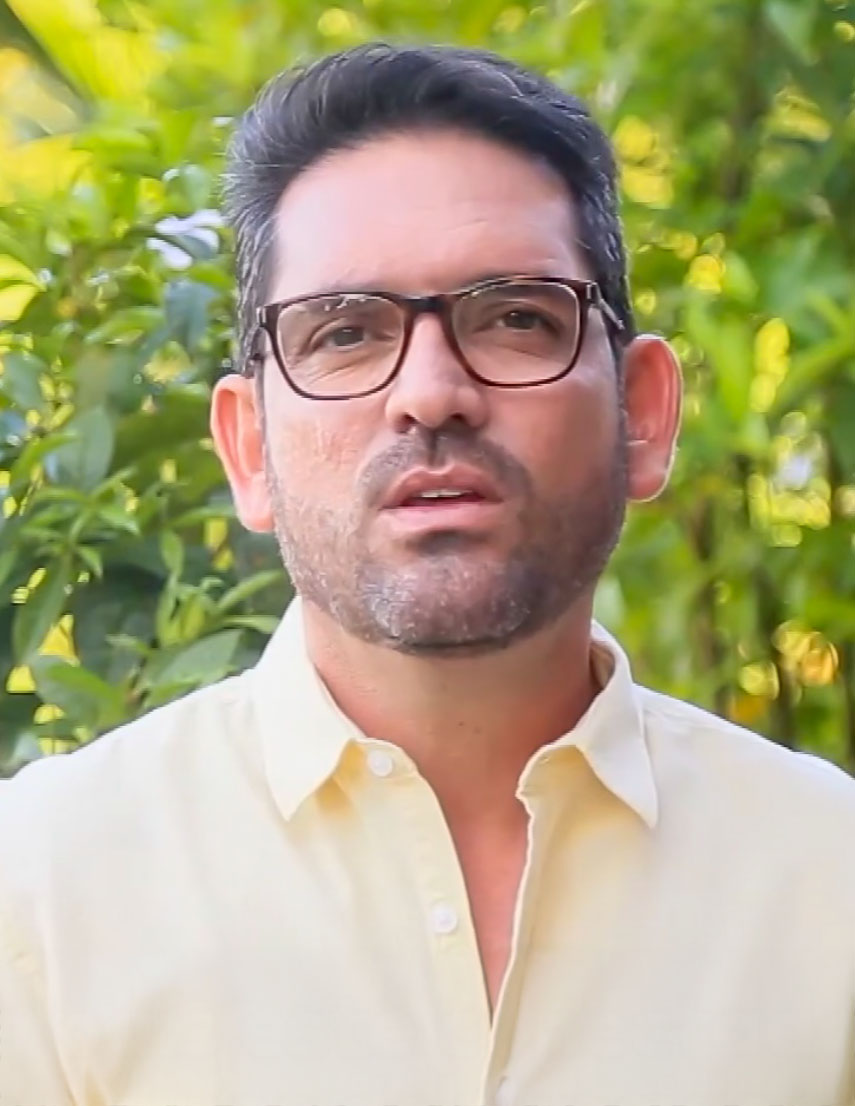
- Zuluaga in 2020

Governor of Meta Department
- Incumbent
- Assumed office 1 January 2020
- Preceded by: Marcela Amaya

Minister of Agriculture and Rural Development
- In office 3 October 2017 – 25 July 2018
- President: Juan Manuel Santos
- Preceded by: Aurelio Iragorri Valencia
- Succeeded by: Andrés Valencia Pinzón

Mayor of Villavicencio
- In office 1 January 2012 – 31 December 2015
- Preceded by: Raúl Franco Roa
- Succeeded by: Wilmar Barbosa Rozo

Personal details
- Born: Juan Guillermo Zuluaga Cardona; November 3, 1970 (age 55) Medellín, Colombia
- Party: Social Party of National Unity
- Spouse: Maria Angélica Rangel Camacho
- Children: 3
- Education: Escuela Superior de Administración Pública
- Occupation: Politician

Juan Guillermo Zuluaga Cardona (born 3 November 1970) is a Colombian politician and public administrator. He has served as the Governor of the Meta Department since 1 January 2020. After he was the Minister of Agriculture and Rural Development from 3 October 2017 to 25 July 2018 under President Juan Manuel Santos, and the Mayor of Villavicencio from 2012 to 2015.

== Early life and education ==
Zuluaga was born in Medellín, Colombia. He studied Public Administration at the Escuela Superior de Administración Pública and Business Administration at the Fundación Universitaria Los Libertadores. He also holds a specialization in Government and Public Management from the Universidad Jorge Tadeo Lozano.

== Political career ==
Zuluaga started his political career as a councilor in Villavicencio, serving two consecutive terms. He was also elected Mayor of Villavicencio.

In October 2017, Zuluaga was appointed Minister of Agriculture and Rural Development by President Juan Manuel Santos, serving until July 2018.

In 2019, he was elected as the Governor of the Meta Department, assuming office on 1 January 2020.
