= El Castillo, Meta =

Coordinates: 3.56806°N 73.7839°W

- Municipality and town
- Flag Coat of arms

- Location of the municipality and town of El Castillo, Meta in the Meta Department of Colombia.
- Country: Colombia
- Department: Meta Department
- Elevation: 530 m (1,740 ft)
- Time zone: UTC-5 (Colombia Standard Time)
- Climate: Am

El Castillo is a town and municipality in the Meta Department, Colombia.

== History ==
The first settlers settled on the banks of the Caño Uruimes, with the passage of time this was elevated to the Category of Police Inspection of the Municipality of San Martín, under the name of Inspection of Urimes. By 1963, the name was changed to La Cal, which was again changed in 1976 when it was created as a municipality with its current name of El Castillo.

El Castillo was elevated to municipality by Ordinance No.001 of 19 February 1976.

== Geography ==
=== Limits ===
The municipality is located in the southwest of the department; in the region known as Alto Ariari

- North with the municipalities of El Dorado and Cubarral;
- South with the municipalities of Lejanías and Granada
- West with the municipalities of Cubarral and Lejanías.
- East with the municipalities of San Martín and Granada.

El Castillo has an average annual rainfall of 3,700 millimetres, and its average temperature is 28 °C.

=== Hydrography ===
The municipality is crossed by the Guape River to the west and the Ariari River to the east, where they join to the southeast of the municipality. To the northwest is the El Guape Lagoon. The La Cal River crosses the municipality, as do the Dulce, Embarrado, Urimes and Yamanes Rivers.

== Economy ==
Agriculture stands out as the main source of income for the municipality, especially corn, rice, cassava, banana and passion fruit crops, as well as smaller-scale crops of bananas, avocado, guava and some citrus fruits. Livestock occupies the second sector of the municipal economy; both in the production of milk and in the production of meat. The industrial sector is not very developed, its main exponent is a corn dryer that is located within the municipal seat; there are also numerous medium and small raw material transformation companies produced in the region.
