= Chingaza Dam =

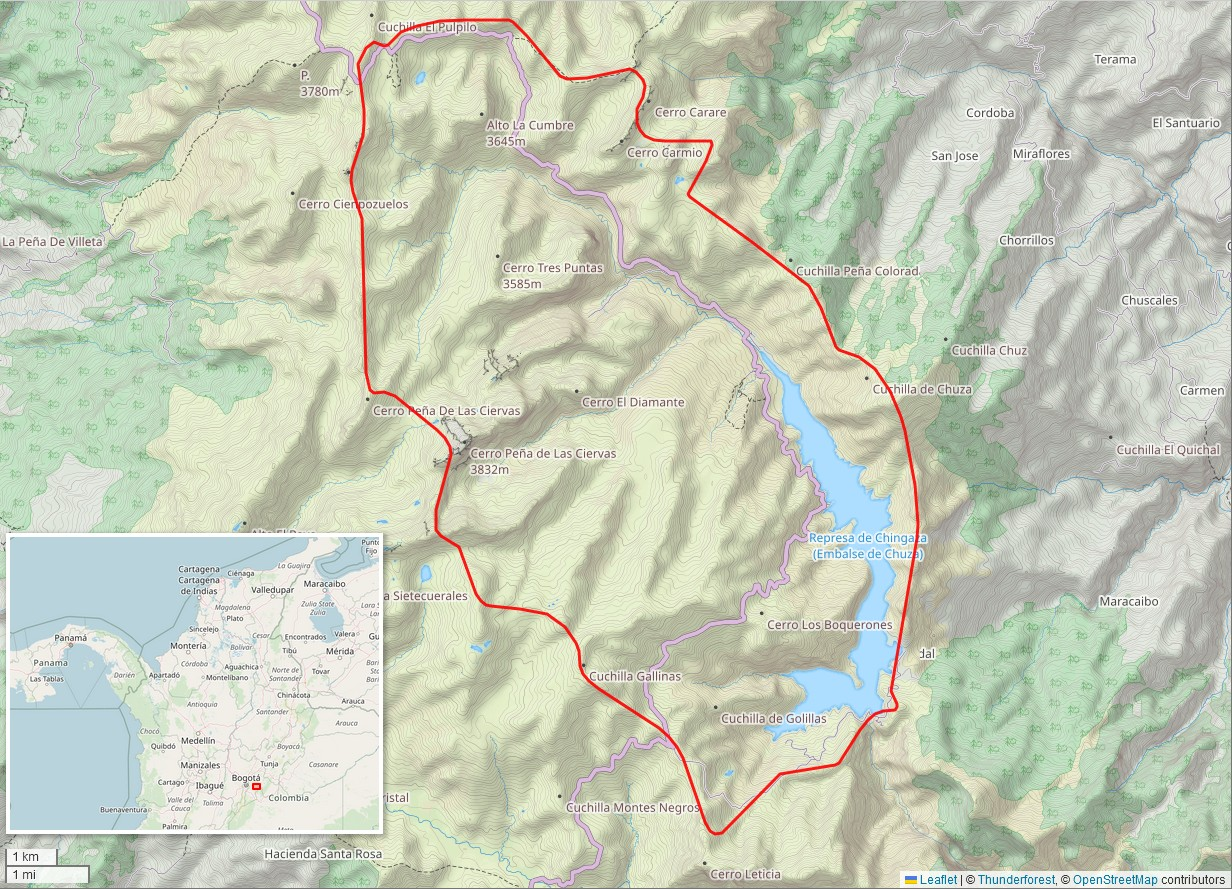
- Drainage basin of Chingaza Reservoir (Interactive map)
- Official name: Chingaza Dam
- Location: Chingaza Natural National Park, Cundinamarca, Colombia
- Coordinates: 4.571°N 73.704°W
- Operator(s): Empresa de Acueducto y Alcantarillado de Bogotá – E.S.P. (Bogotá Water and Wastewater Company)

Dam and spillways
- Impounds: Guatiquia River
- Height: 120 metres (390 ft)

Reservoir
- Creates: Chuza Reservoir

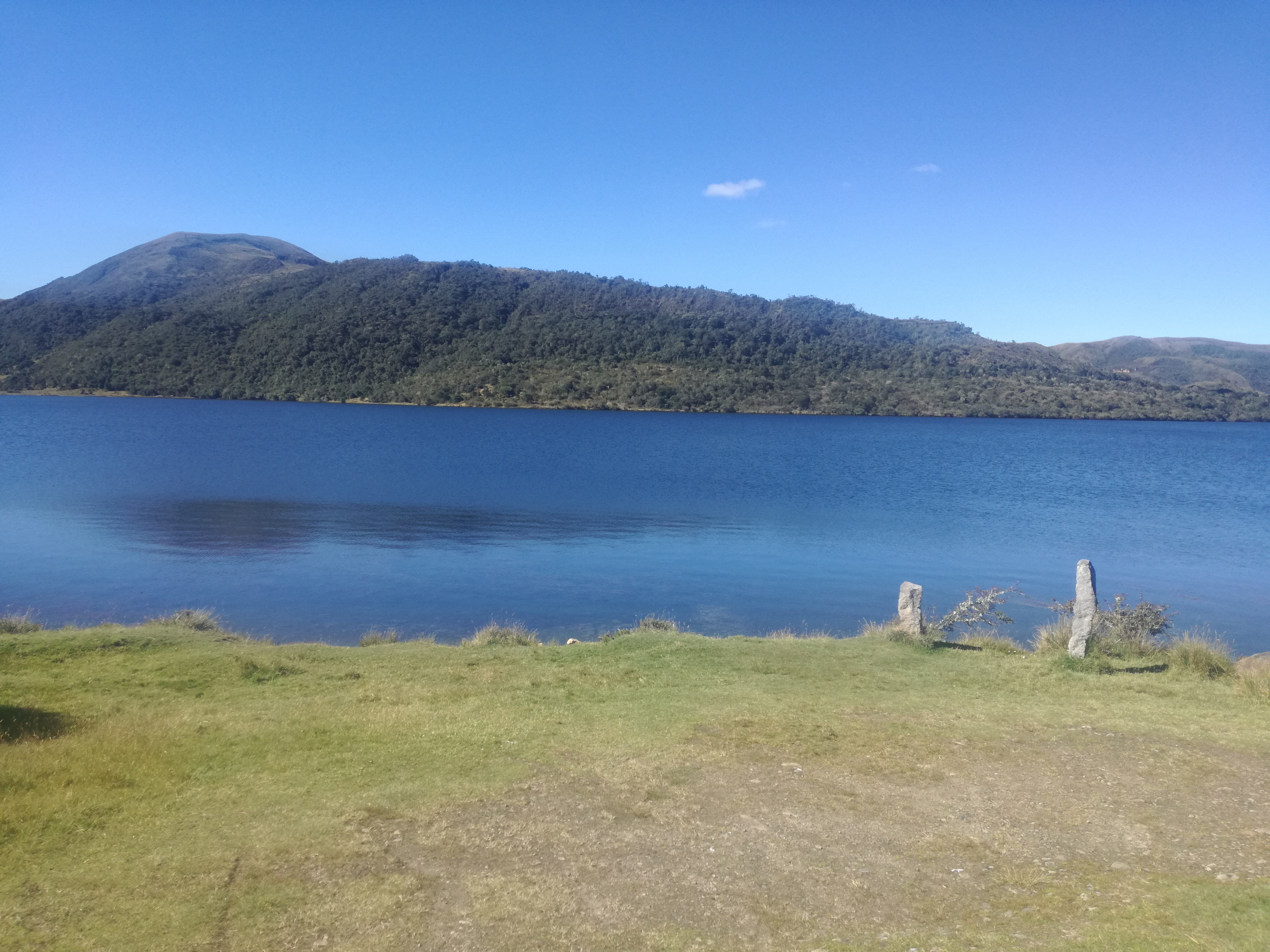
Chingaza Lake

Chingaza Dam is a large dam in Colombia which supplies water to the capital city of Bogotá. The dam, on the Guatiquia River, is in the Chingaza National Park, 55 kilometres (34 mi) northeast of Bogotá. The dam is gravel fill with a concrete face. Behind the dam, the Chuza Reservoir holds 223,000,000 cubic metres (59×10^{9} US gal).

== Etymology ==
The name Chingaza comes from Chibcha and means "middle of the width".

== History of conflict ==
In January 2002, rebels of the Revolutionary Armed Forces of Colombia (FARC) damaged the dam in an act of terrorism by placing an explosive on a gate valve in one of the dam's tunnels.
