= Jaime Andrés Marulanda =

Colombian hitman

Jaime Andrés Marulanda (born 1978) is a confessed Colombian hitman who claimed to have committed 137 murders. The authorities confirmed 37 of those killings, many of which were committed between April and November 2002.

According to his own confession, Marulanda worked as a patrolman for the AUC, who ordered most of the murders. Many of his victims were social leaders, but also included minors.

Nicknamed El Chiquilín due to his short stature (1,50 centimeters), Marulanda is currently being held in an Acacías prison. He was sentenced to 28 years imprisonment.

== Crimes ==
Marulanda is believed to have carried out most of the murders between April and November 2002, in an area called Cazucá and Bosa, between Bogotá and Soacha. He worked for the AUC, a group that ordered several targeted assassinations. According to the files of the Colombian authorities, he earned approximately $400,000 pesos for each murder.

Of the 137 murders he confessed to having committed, he is associated with two in particular: being responsible for or at least complicit in the deaths of Luis Alfredo Colmenares Chía, former governor and representative to the House of Arauca Department, and former congressman Octavio Sarmiento.

Among some of the Marulanda's victims included in the list are the following:

- José Anderson Grillo and Harbey Ricardo Jaramillo, March 21.
- Ángel Enrique Meneses, Elkin Jonathan Acosta and Rubén Darío Limas, May 13.
- Pedro Antonio Monroy, May 14.
- Anderson Calderón Moreno, May 22.
- Anyerson Felipe Velásquez, May 26.
- José Jair Agudelo and Omar Alberto Rodríguez, May 30.
- José Mauricio Galeano, June 1.
- Ricardo Alexander Uribe, June 2.
- Valerio Vicente Borda, June 13.
- Waldo and José Edison Galindo, June 22.
- John William Soler, July 11.
- Manuel Elías Leudo and César Augusto Vargas, July 20.
- Duvar Andrés Duque, July 27.
- Gina Penagos, August 10.
- Christopher Barrero, August 13.
- Jhonatan Francisco Rivera, August 29.
- Freddy Arley Herrera, August 30.
- Diana Alexandra Chávez Ruiz, September 6.
- Yeison Eduardo Pinto and Miguel Ángel Quevedo, September 15.
- David Amado, September 15.
- Juan Evangelista Calderón and Julio Alexander Salamanca, September 19.

== Capture and imprisonment ==
Marulanda was captured by Colombian authorities in 2003, after he was conclusively connected to the 37 murders. On the day of his trial, he admitted to killing a total of 137 people.

Due to the crimes for which he was responsible, Marulada was imposed a 28-year sentence. He is serving said sentence at a prison in Acacías.
