= Marcela Amaya =

Colombian politician

Marcela Amaya García

Governor of Meta Department
- In office January 1, 2016 – December 31, 2019
- Preceded by: Alan Jara
- Succeeded by: Juan Guillermo Zuluaga

Personal details
- Born: October 19, 1968 (age 57) Villavicencio, Colombia
- Party: Liberal Party
- Profession: Politician

Marcela Amaya García (born October 19, 1968) is a Colombian politician who served as the Governor of Meta Department from 2016 to 2019. She is a member of the Liberal Party.

== Early life and education ==
Marcela Amaya was born in Villavicencio, Meta. She completed her higher education in public administration.

== Political career ==
Before becoming governor, Amaya held other public service positions which brought her to public notice and helped in her election as the governor of Meta in 2015.

== Governorship (2016–2019) ==
She supports the implementation of peace agreements in the region. In 2018, she met with international representatives and United Nations officials to discuss the progress and challenges of the peace process in Meta.
