= Acacías =

Acacias
- Municipality and town
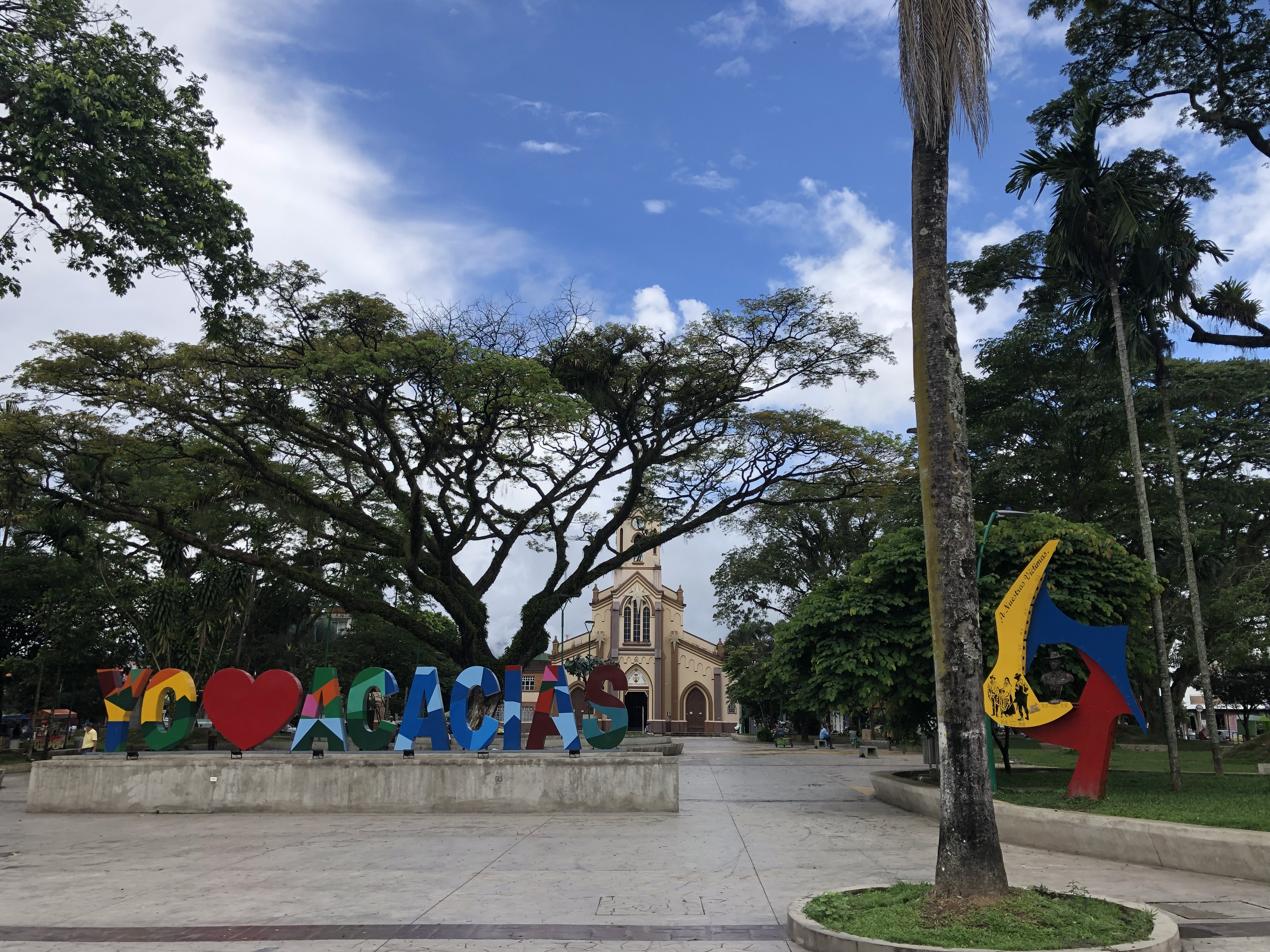
- Central plaza in Acacías

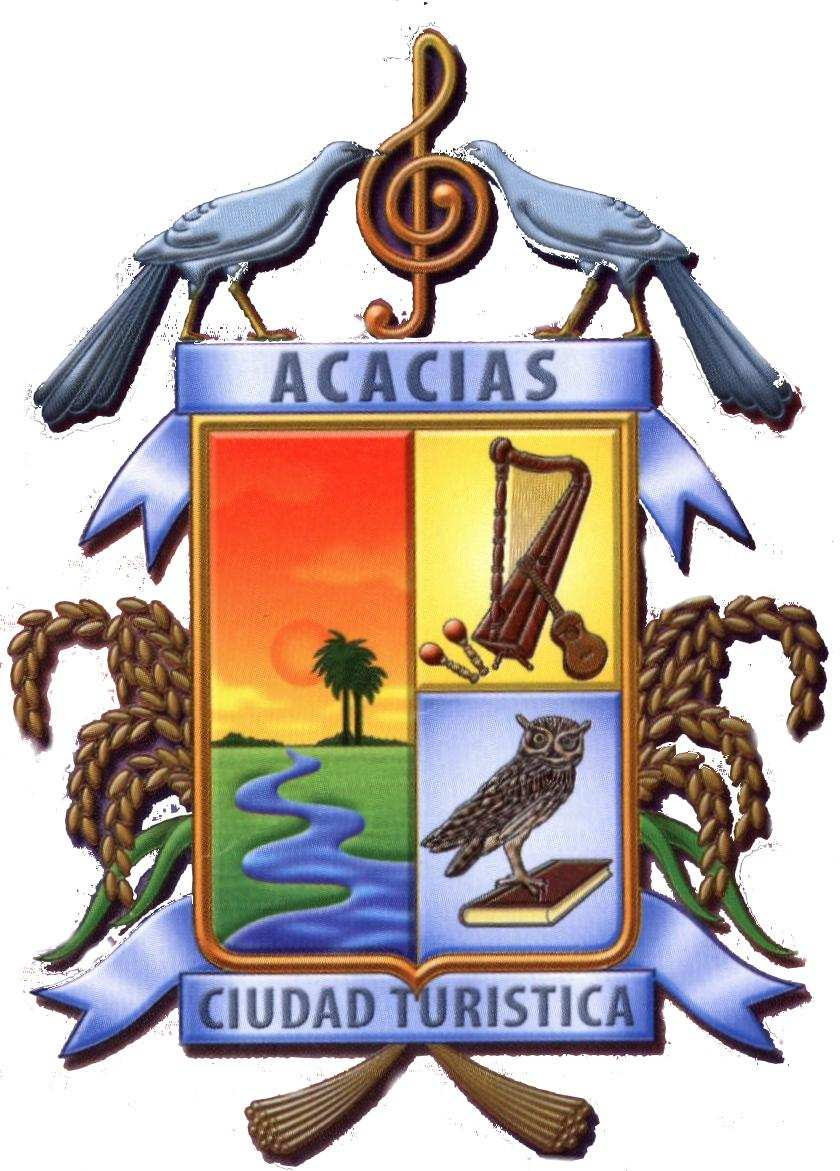
- Flag Coat of arms

- Location of the municipality and town of Acacías in the Meta Department.

- Location in Colombia
- Coordinates: 3°59′16″N 73°45′35″W
- Country: Colombia
- Department: Meta Department
- Founded: 1920

Government
  - Mayor: Luis Orlando Gutierrez

Area
  - Municipality and town: 1,124 km^{2} (434 sq mi)
  - Urban: 11.49 km^{2} (4.44 sq mi)
- Elevation: 498 m (1,634 ft)

Population (2018 census)
  - Municipality and town: 88,023
  - Density: 78.31/km^{2} (202.8/sq mi)
  - Urban: 67,906
  - Urban density: 5,910/km^{2} (15,310/sq mi)
- Demonym: Acacireño
- Time zone: UTC-5 (Colombia Standard Time)
- Area code: 57 + 8
- Climate: Af
- Website: Official website

Acacias is a town and municipality in the Meta Department, Colombia. This town is one of the most important municipalities in terms of population and economy, together with La Macarena, Granada and the capital city of Villavicencio. The name of the city is due to the acacia flowers that used to bloom in the region. It is considered one of the municipalities of Meta with more progress and development.

It is bordered to the north by the department of Cundinamarca. To the south with the municipalities Castilla la Nueva and Guamal. To the east with the municipality of San Carlos de Guaroa and to the west with the municipality of Guamal.

The National Administrative Department of Statistics (DANE), estimates for 2017, a total population of 72,048.

== Geography ==
In the urban area of this municipality there are 97 neighborhoods and housing developments, and in the rural area there are 48 rural districts, including Chichimene, Dinamarca and Manzanares. There are also former police stations.

== Climate ==
Acacías has a tropical rainforest climate (Köppen Af) with extremely heavy rainfall from April to November, and more moderate though still substantial rainfall from December to March.

Climate data for Acacías
Month	Jan	Feb	Mar	Apr	May	Jun	Jul	Aug	Sep	Oct	Nov	Dec	Year
Mean daily maximum °C (°F)	30.9 (87.6)	31.2 (88.2)	31.0 (87.8)	29.9 (85.8)	29.4 (84.9)	29.0 (84.2)	29.0 (84.2)	29.7 (85.5)	30.2 (86.4)	30.2 (86.4)	30.2 (86.4)	30.3 (86.5)	30.1 (86.2)
Daily mean °C (°F)	25.5 (77.9)	25.9 (78.6)	26.0 (78.8)	25.0 (77.0)	24.8 (76.6)	24.3 (75.7)	24.2 (75.6)	24.5 (76.1)	24.9 (76.8)	25.0 (77.0)	25.1 (77.2)	24.9 (76.8)	25.0 (77.0)
Mean daily minimum °C (°F)	20.1 (68.2)	20.6 (69.1)	21.0 (69.8)	20.2 (68.4)	20.2 (68.4)	19.6 (67.3)	19.4 (66.9)	19.4 (66.9)	19.6 (67.3)	19.8 (67.6)	20.0 (68.0)	19.5 (67.1)	20.0 (67.9)
Average rainfall mm (inches)	76.1 (3.00)	126.1 (4.96)	258.3 (10.17)	554.7 (21.84)	660.3 (26.00)	558.3 (21.98)	435.2 (17.13)	375.1 (14.77)	392.9 (15.47)	499.1 (19.65)	469.1 (18.47)	227.8 (8.97)	4,633 (182.41)
Average rainy days (≥ 1 mm)	6	7	12	21	24	23	23	18	17	19	18	11	199
Source 1:
Source 2:

== Economy ==
- Throughout the municipality of Acacías, the main economic sector is agriculture and livestock.
- Both light and medium industry is small, with a predominance of artisanal processes.
- Mining and oil exploitation have recently acquired great importance.
- The tertiary sector is evidenced by strong commerce in the urban area with an emphasis on the sale of finished products rather than services.

== Ecology ==
The lands of Acacías are very rich in rivers such as: Acacias, Acaciítas, Guayuriba, Sardinata and Orotoy, as well as by the caños del Playón, Cola de pato, la Chiripa, Chichimene, La Danta, La Argentina, La Blanca and La Unión.

== Tourism ==
Acacías has a great natural wealth, because it is surrounded by rivers, viewpoints and waterfalls. All this allows tourists and locals to perform different activities such as hiking, outdoor sports, bird watching, among others.
