= Caño Cristales =

River in Colombia

Coordinates: 2°15′51″N 73°47′40″W

Caño Cristales liquid rainbow, river of five colours
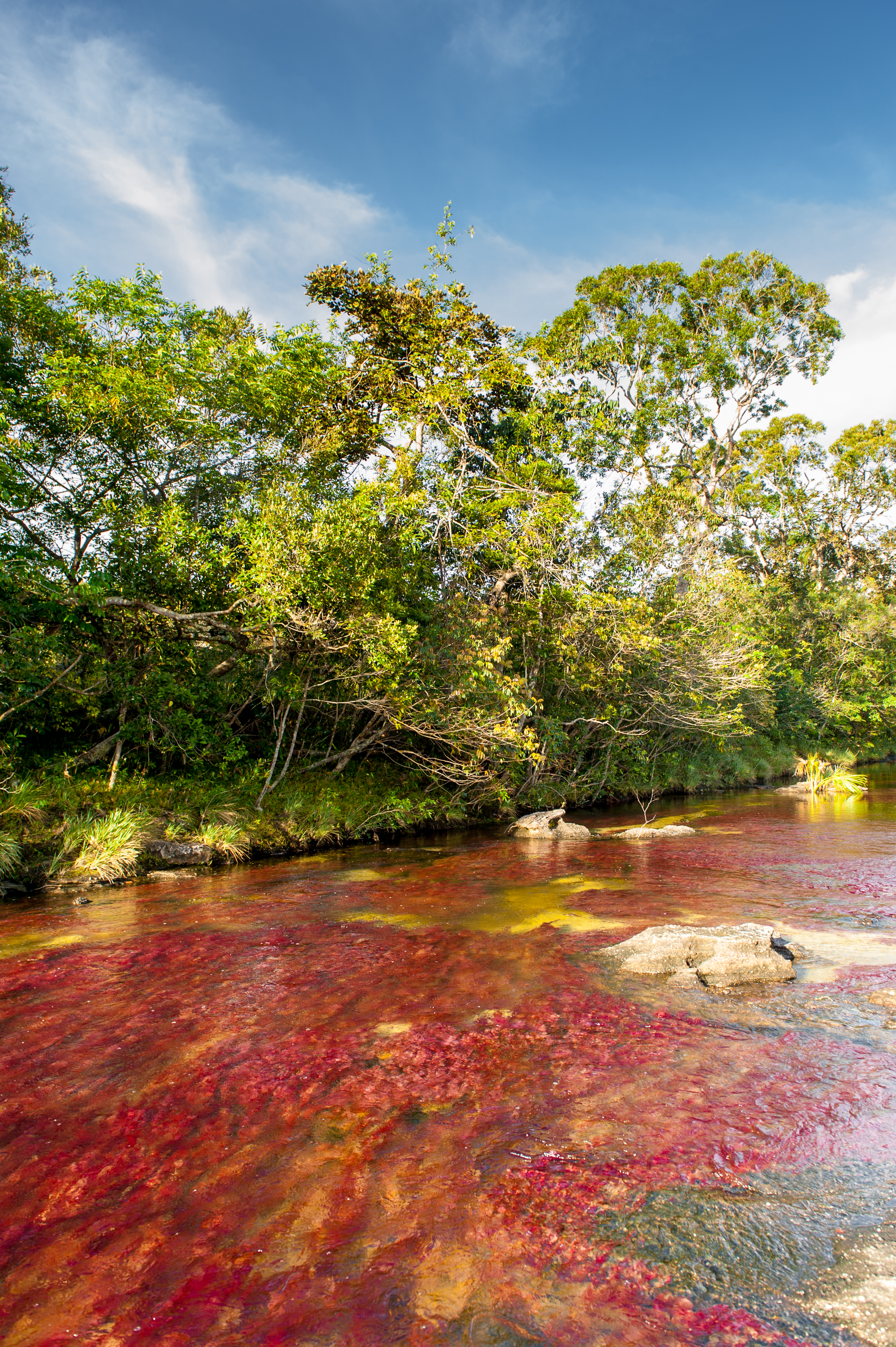
- Caño Cristales

- Location within Colombia

Location
- Country: Colombia
- Department: Meta

Physical characteristics
- Source: Serranía de la Macarena
- Mouth: Guayabero River
- Length: 100 km (62 mi)

The Caño Cristales (Spanish pronunciation: [ˈkaɲo kɾisˈtales]; English: "Crystal Channel") is a river located in the Serranía de la Macarena, an isolated mountain range in Meta Department, Colombia. It is a tributary of the Guayabero River, itself a part of the Orinoco basin. Caño Cristales was found in 1969 by a group of cattle farmers. The river is commonly called the "River of Five Colors" or the "Liquid Rainbow," and is noted for its striking colors. The bed of the river from the end of July through November is variously colored yellow, green, blue, black, and especially red, the last caused by Rhyncholacis clavigera (syn. Macarenia clavigera) plants on the riverbed. In recent years, the river has become a tourist destination; there were more than 16,000 visitors in 2016.

== Geography ==
The quartzite rocks of the Serrania de la Macarena tableland formed approximately 1.2 billion years ago. They are a western extension of the Guiana Shield.

Caño Cristales is a fast-flowing river with many rapids and waterfalls. Small circular pits known as giant's kettles can be found in many parts of the riverbed, which have been formed by pebbles or chunks of harder rocks. Once one of these harder rock fragments falls into one of the cavities, it is rotated by the water current and begins to carve at the cavity wall, increasing the dimensions of the pit.

== Fauna and flora ==
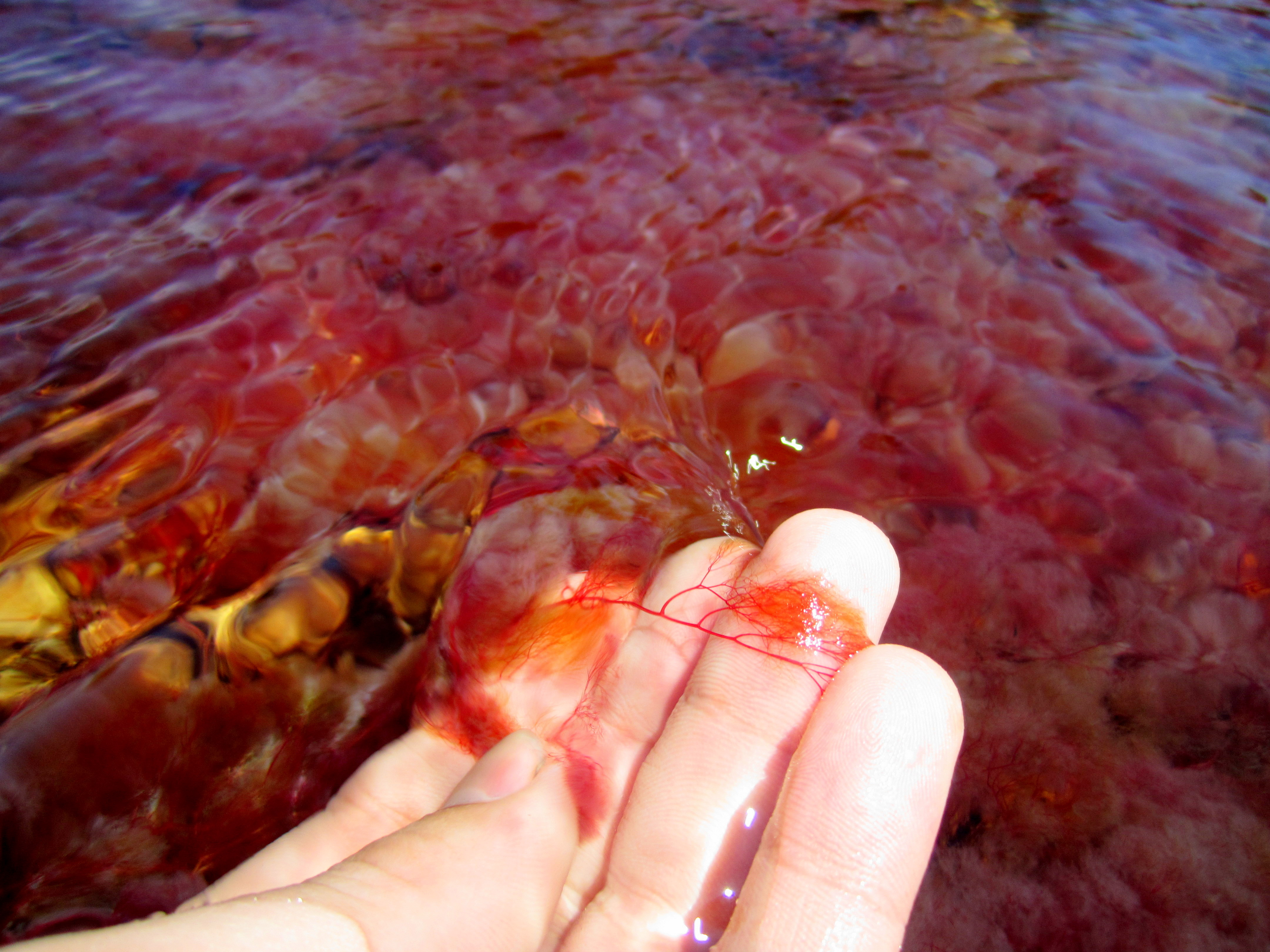
Rhyncholacis clavigera is best known for its red color, but it can also be green or yellowish

The Serranía de la Macarena is located on the border of three large ecosystems, each of them with high diversity of flora and fauna: the Andes, the Llanos, and the Amazon rainforest. The representative biome of the Serrania de la Macarena is the hydrophytic rainforest: hot, warm, and cold. The tableland is home to about 420 species of birds, 10 species of amphibians, 43 species of reptiles, and eight primates. Caño Cristales is home to several species of fish (despite sometimes claimed to contain no fish), freshwater turtles and other aquatic animals.

Caño Cristales river has a wide variety of aquatic plants. The water of the river is extremely clear due to the lack of nutrients and small particles. Almost unique is the bright red – pink coloration of the riverbed after the rainy period from the end of June till November. This color is caused by great quantities of plant species Rhyncholacis clavigera (often known by its former name, Macarenia clavigera). This plant is only found in Caño Cristales and a few other rivers in the region, such as the Caño Siete Machos. These plants, which are green when young, then turn yellowish and finally various shade of red, adhere tightly to rocks in places where the river has faster current.
