= Ewald Wollny =

German agricultural physicist (1846–1901)

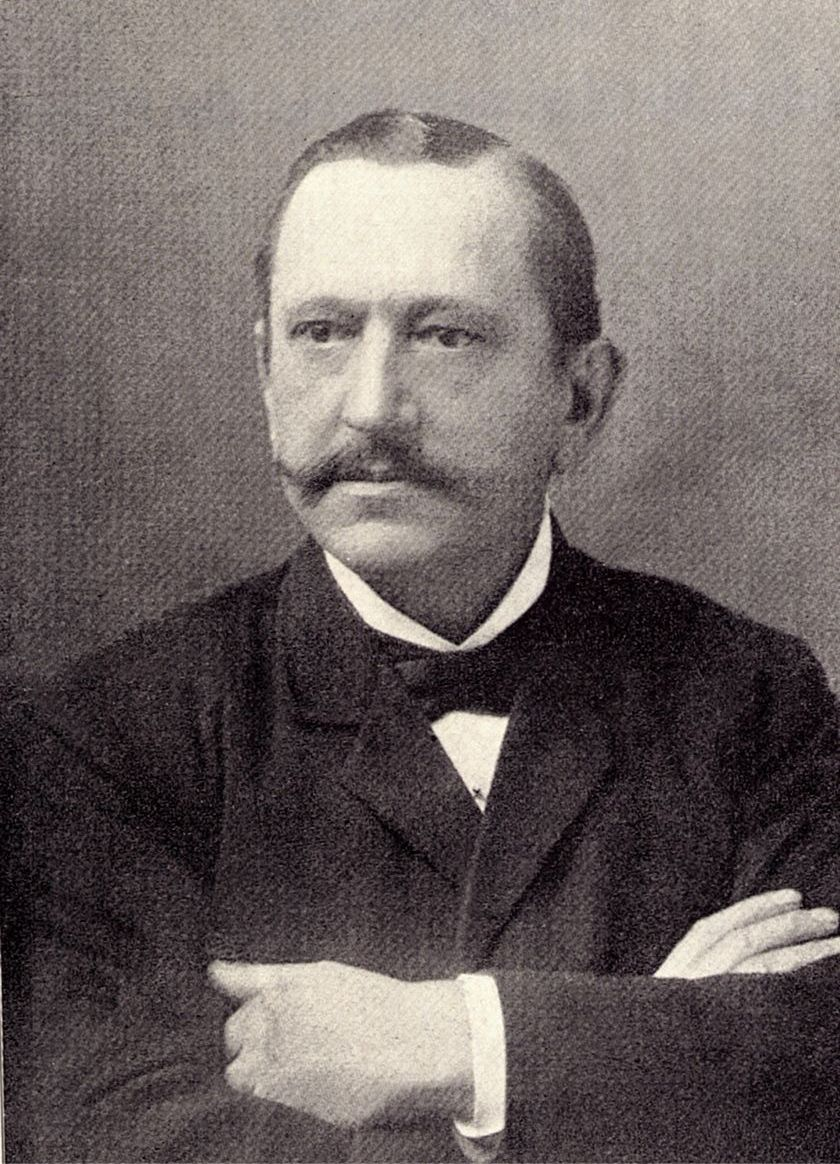
Ewald Wollny

Martin Ewald Wollny (20 March 1846 – 8 January 1901) was a German agricultural physicist. He is the founder of agrophysics.

== Life and career ==
Wollny was born on 20 March 1846 in Berlin. He is recognized for having carried out pioneering work in understanding the role of rainfall in soil erosion. He is possibly the first agrophysicist to conduct detailed studies into the effects of rain infiltration as a source of erosion, doing so as early as 1874.

In 1878, Wollny helped found the scientific journal Forschungen auf dem Gebiete der Agrikulturphysik, or "Research in the Field of Agricultural Physics", publishing numerous papers there, and serving as the chief editor until 1898.

Wollny is also notable for a minor scientific dispute with Charles Darwin, concerning the role of earthworms in agriculture. In 1882, following the publication of The Formation of Vegetable Mould Through the Action of Worms, Wollny published a review in Forschungen auf dem Gebiete der Agrikulturphysik titled "Ch. Darwin. Die Bildung der Ackererde durch die Thätigkeit der Würmer." in which he laid down a series of criticisms directed at Darwin's hypotheses on earthworms, primarily disparaging the lack of evidence supporting the idea that earthworms were beneficial towards agriculture, and countering that from his own observations, he believed earthworms were likely harmful or parasitic towards plants. Following the publication of this criticism, between 1883 and 1889 Wollny conducted a series of earthworm-related experiments in controlled fields and pots on crops such as cereals, legumes, flax, potatoes, and sugar beets to test his hypothesis that earthworms were harmful to soil. In 1890, Wollny published his results in his journal, admitting his hypothesis was incorrect, and sharing his findings that earthworms appeared to significantly improve plant health and size, and improve the permeability of soil.

Wollny taught at the Technical University of Munich since 1872. He died in Munich on 8 January 1901.

== Literary works ==
- Editor & contributor of the "Forschungen auf dem Gebiete der Agrikulturphysik", 20 vols., 1878–1898
- Saat und Pflege der landwirtschaftlichen Kulturpflanzen, 1885
- Die Kultur der Getreidearten, 1887
- Der Einfluss der Pflanzendecke und der Beschattung auf die physikalischen Eigenschaften und Fruchtbarkeit des Bodens, 1877
- Die Zersetzung Der Organischen Stoffe und die Humusbildungen. Mit Rücksicht auf die Bodencultur, 1897

== See also ==
- Rainfall simulator
