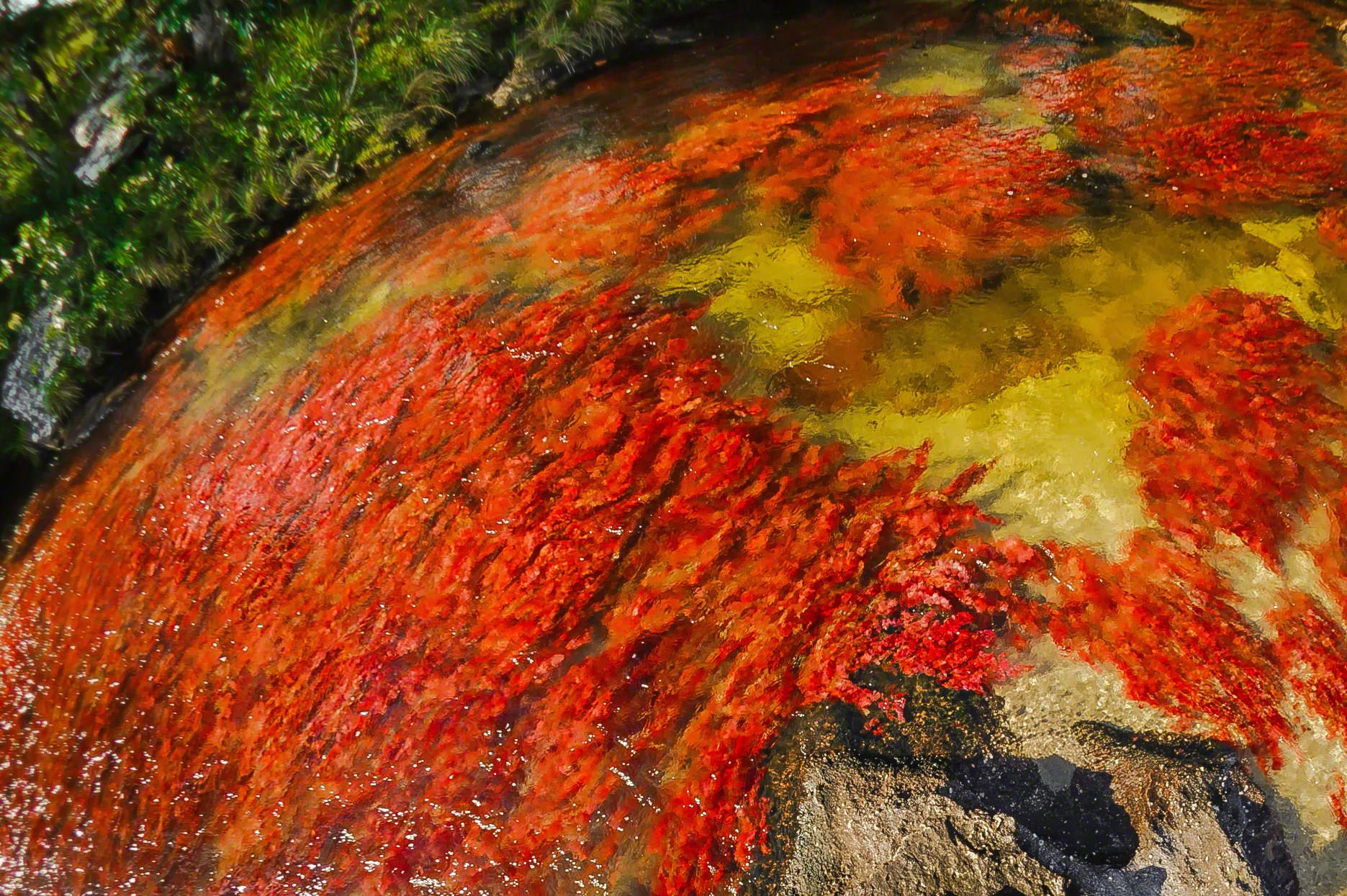

Scientific classification
- Kingdom: Plantae
- Clade: Tracheophytes
- Clade: Angiosperms
- Clade: Eudicots
- Clade: Rosids
- Order: Malpighiales
- Family: Podostemaceae
- Genus: Rhyncholacis
- Species: R. clavigera

Binomial name
- Rhyncholacis clavigera (P. Royen) B. R. Ruhfel & C. T. Philbrick

Synonyms
- Macarenia clavigera P.Royen

= Rhyncholacis clavigera =

Species of flowering plant

Rhyncholacis clavigera is a species of aquatic plant in the family Podostemaceae. It is found in the Caño Cristales river in Colombia.

== Distribution and habitat ==
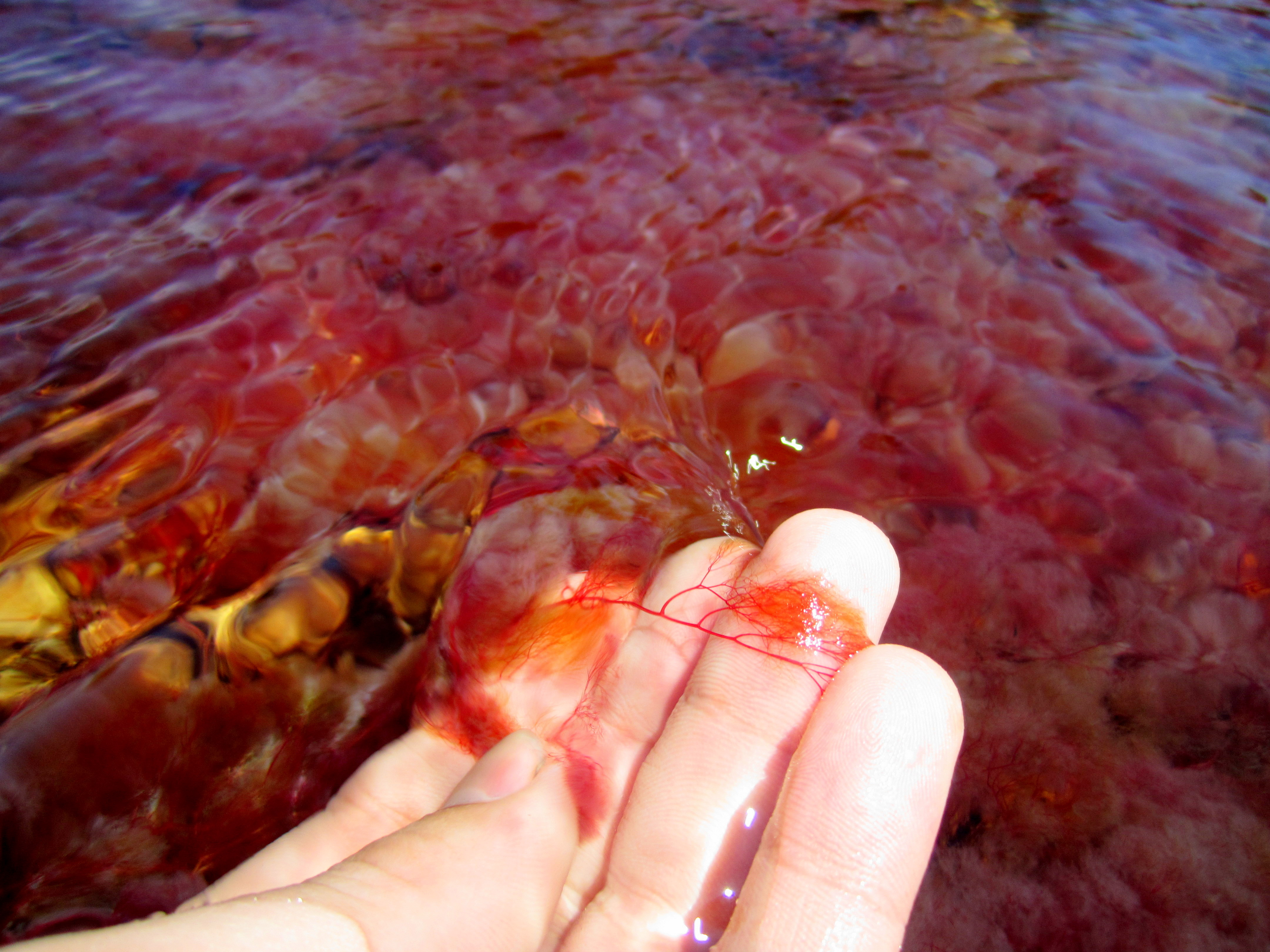

Rhyncholacis clavigera is an aquatic plant native to the Caño Cristales river in Colombia.
