= Piedemonte =

- Country: Colombia
- Department: Meta
- Time zone: UTC−5 (COT)

The Piedemonte is a region of the Colombian Department of Meta.
