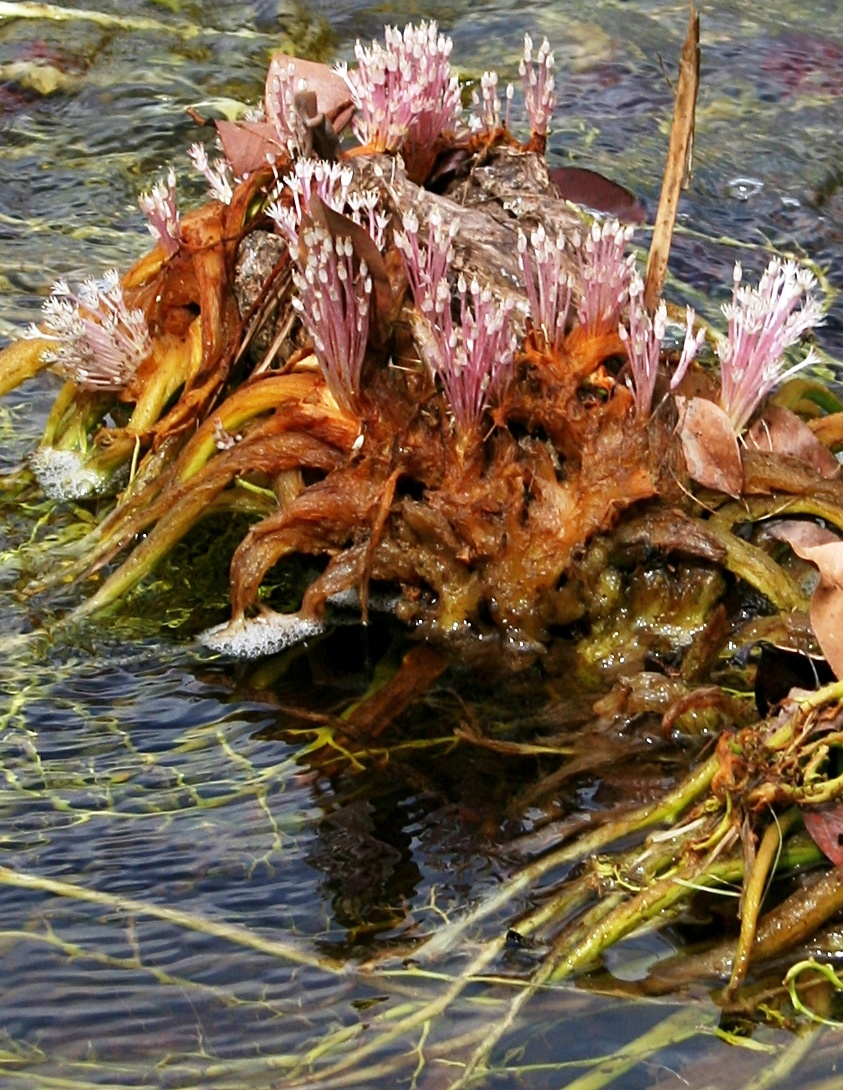
- Flowers and underwater leaves of Rhyncholacis penicillata

Scientific classification
- Kingdom: Plantae
- Clade: Tracheophytes
- Clade: Angiosperms
- Clade: Eudicots
- Clade: Rosids
- Order: Malpighiales
- Family: Podostemaceae
- Genus: Rhyncholacis; Tul. (1849)

Species
- 28; see text

Synonyms
- Macarenia P.Royen (1951)

= Rhyncholacis =

Genus of plants

Rhyncholacis is a genus of flowering plants belonging to the family Podostemaceae.

It includes 28 species native to tropical South America, including Colombia, Peru, Venezuela, the Guianas, and northern Brazil.

== Species ==
28 species are accepted.

- Rhyncholacis apiculata P.Royen
- Rhyncholacis applanata Goebel
- Rhyncholacis brassicifolia P.Royen
- Rhyncholacis brevistamina P.Royen
- Rhyncholacis carinata P.Royen
- Rhyncholacis clavigera (P.Royen) B.R.Ruhfel & C.T.Philbrick
- Rhyncholacis coronata P.Royen
- Rhyncholacis crassipes Spruce ex Wedd.
- Rhyncholacis cristata P.Royen
- Rhyncholacis dentata P.Royen
- Rhyncholacis divaricata Matthiesen
- Rhyncholacis flagellifolia P.Royen
- Rhyncholacis guyanensis P.Royen
- Rhyncholacis hydrocichorium Tul.
- Rhyncholacis jenmanii Engl.
- Rhyncholacis linearis Tul.
- Rhyncholacis macrocarpa Tul.
- Rhyncholacis minima P.Royen
- Rhyncholacis minor P.Royen
- Rhyncholacis nitelloides (Wedd.) P.Royen
- Rhyncholacis nobilis P.Royen
- Rhyncholacis oligandra Wedd.
- Rhyncholacis palmettifolia P.Royen
- Rhyncholacis paulana C.T.Philbrick & C.P.Bove
- Rhyncholacis penicillata Matthiesen
- Rhyncholacis squamosa (Wedd.) C.T.Philbrick & C.P.Bove
- Rhyncholacis unguifera P.Royen
- Rhyncholacis varians Spruce ex Wedd.
