= Rainfall simulator =

Device to study how soil reacts to rain

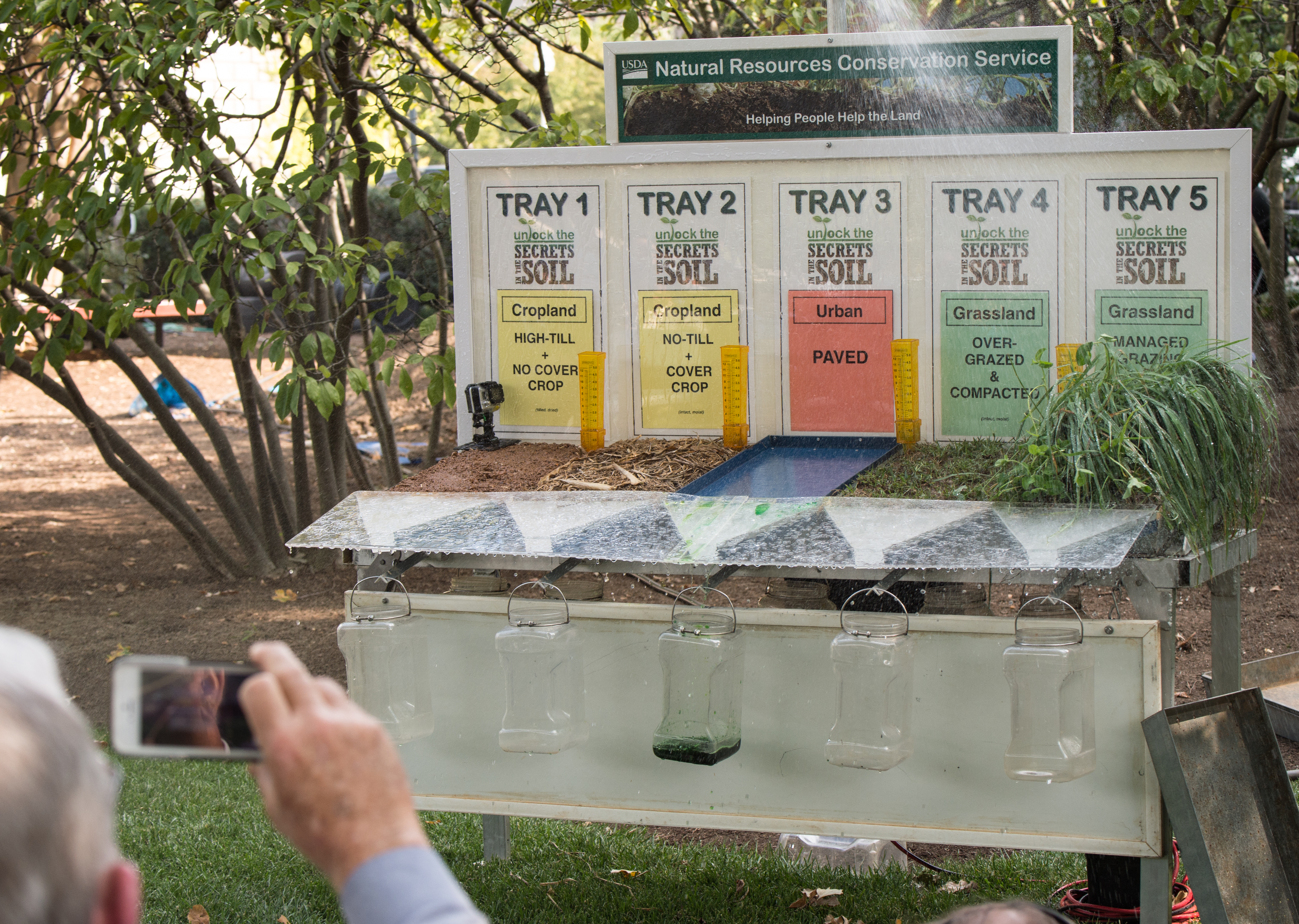
Rainfall simulator showing the effect of crop canopy on erosion

A rainfall simulator is used in soil science and hydrology to study how soil reacts to rainfall. Natural rainfall is difficult to use in experimentation because its timing and intensity cannot be reliably reproduced. Using simulated rainfall significantly speeds the study of erosion, surface runoff and leaching.

The simplest rainfall simulators qualitatively demonstrate what happens to soil during rainfall events. They are useful for explaining how fertilizer may run off (wash away) rather than supply nutrients to crops.

== History ==
The evolution of the rainfall simulator started in the late 1800s when German Scientist Ewald Wollny formally studied erosion. As the study continued into the early 1910s, experimental field plots were designed to capture runoff from natural rainfall. In the 1930s, pioneers of erosion studies tightened control of their experiments by building the first rainfall simulators, ‌ ordinary sprinkle cans or pipes with holes. These holes were replaced in the 1960s with full cone nozzles, carefully selected to accurately approximate:

- The size of a rainfall water drop
- The velocity of a drop as it strikes the ground
- The uniformity of drops across a plot, to assure an accurate simulation of rainfall

Simulators of the 1960s could simulate only a single rainfall intensity. By the 1980s, solenoid valves could modulate water flow to dynamically vary the intensity of simulated rainfall, much as rainfall intensity naturally varies in storms. As the technology matured in the early 1990s, rainfall simulators were used in the United States as part of the Water Erosion Prediction Project to update the universal soil loss equation.

== Design considerations ==
=== Purpose ===
Modern research simulators are typically designed around the tasks they are intended to perform, ranging from simple demonstrations for farmers to the advanced scientific study of erosion, surface runoff, and sediment size. Other scientific studies may include evaluating tillage management, the effects of soil compaction, soil crusting, and infiltration in agricultural soils.

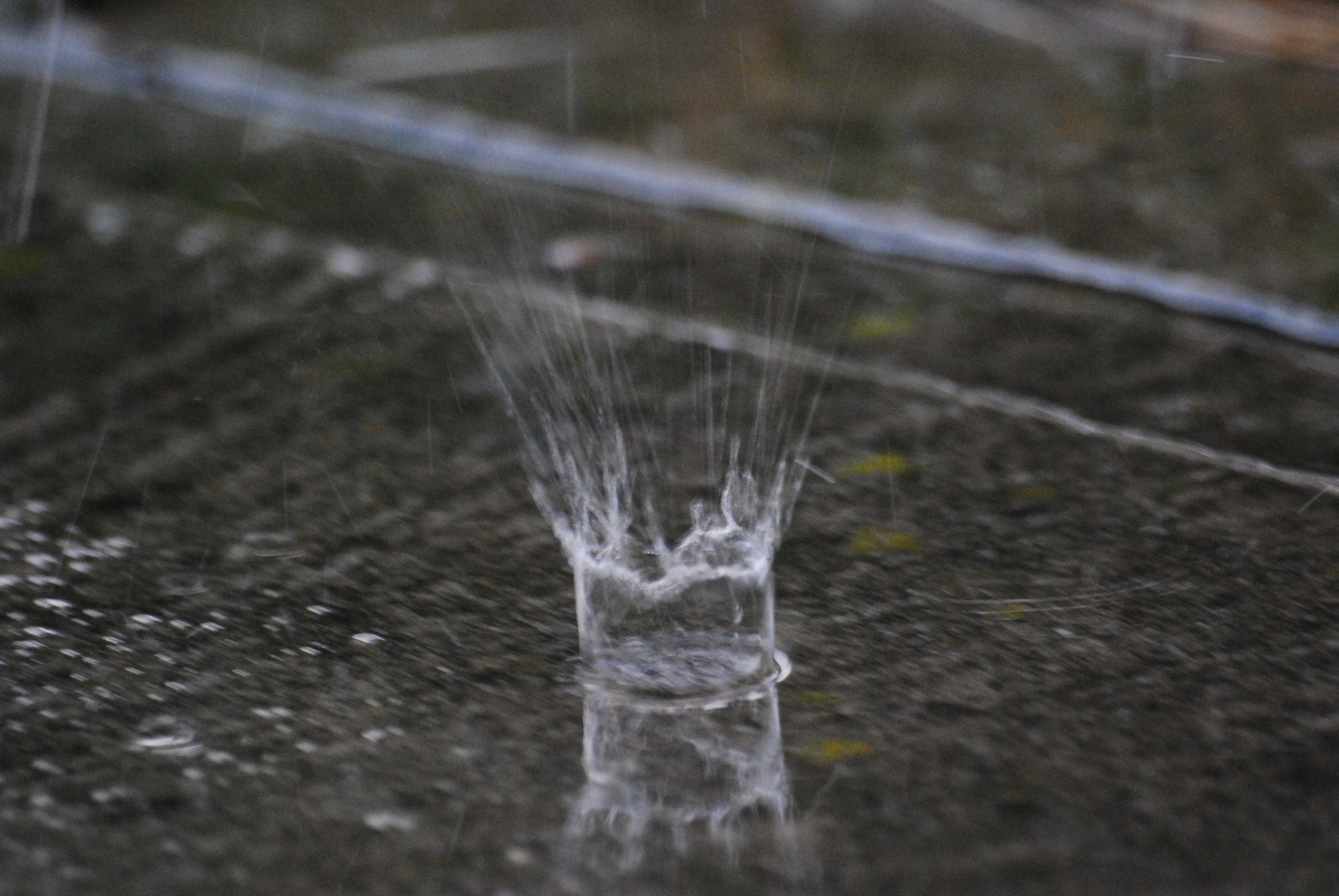
Splash from a raindrop which can cause erosion

In erosion studies, if no crop canopy is present over the soil, the size distribution and terminal velocity of the raindrop must be accurately simulated, as they affect splash erosion.

=== Requirements ===
The main components of a rainfall simulator are the drop generator, a water feed system, and possibly a windshield.

==== Water feed system ====
The water feed system can be either unpressurized or pressurized. Unpressurized systems usually consist of a water tank suspended above a field plot. Gravity moves the water to the plot. Pressurized systems use a pump to move water to the plot.

==== Drop generators ====
Drop generators convert a flow of water to simulated rainfall drops. Two types of drop generators exist. The first type is a gravity-fed unpressurized feed system such as a perforated pipe, hanging yarns, or an array of syringe needles which form drops. The second type is a pressurized feed system connected to a nozzle. Drop generator height is important in many scientific simulators to ensure water droplets approach terminal velocity in the downward direction. The typical height is three meters (ten feet) high. Pressurized drop generators used in scientific work often have a full cone spray nozzle which is different than most irrigation nozzles. Full cone nozzles are specifically designed to spray a very uniform distribution. Full cone nozzles may be either square or circular. Square nozzles are better suited to rectangular plots, while round nozzles are better suited for round plots.

==== Windshields ====
Windshields prevent wind from blowing the water drops away from the plot. A windshield may be a lightweight tarp common in a portable rainfall simulator used for experiments of shorter duration, or it could be a sizable structure in the case of a permanent simulator common in long-term studies. A trade-off exists between heavier windshields, which can typically withstand higher winds, and lighter windshields which are easier to transport.

=== Frame type ===
A rainfall simulator can be distinguished by the type of frame it uses:

- A box rainfall simulator has a rectangular frame.
- A Norton ladder simulator is distinguishable by its large triangular frame.
- A rotating boom simulator is a permanent simulator with similarities to a center pivot irrigation system.
- An oscillating nozzle simulator is a simulator with a sprinkler that swings to cover the distribution of a large plot.

=== Other considerations ===
- Fixed intensity simulators are cheaper to produce; however, variable intensity simulators can accurately simulate the intensity variation of a natural rain typical of most storms. Variable rate flows are generated by either rapidly switching on and off a solenoid valve or by injecting air into the lines.
- Field-based simulators are useful for experiments which simulate what happens in field conditions, while lab-based simulators offer tighter control of experiments.
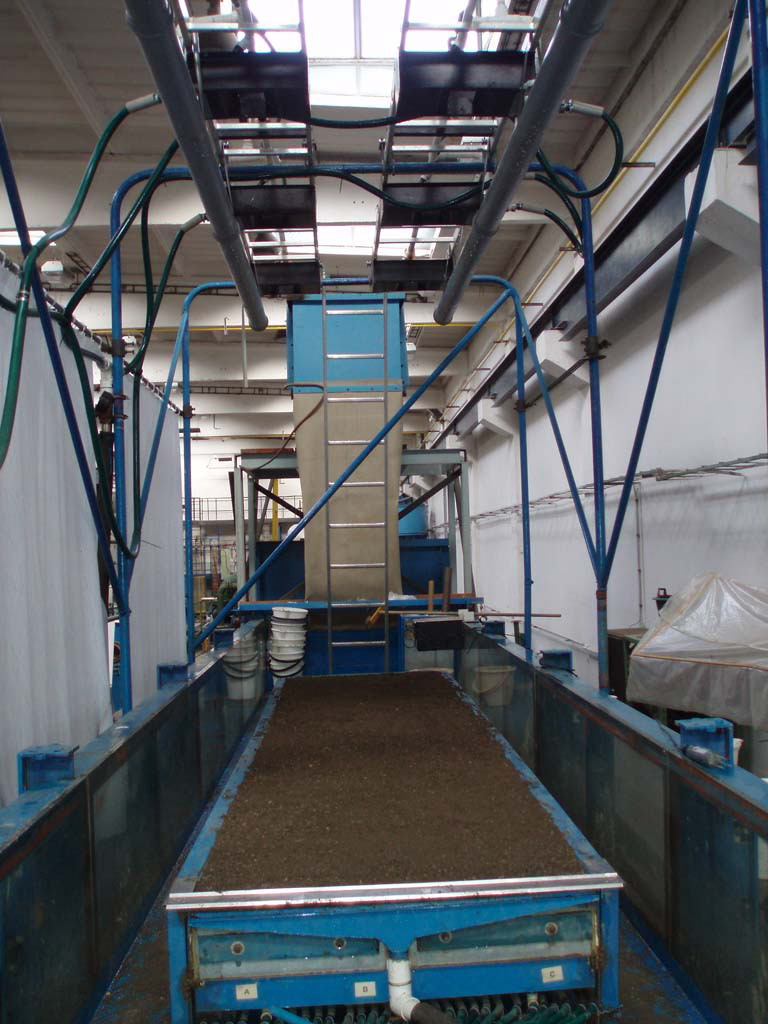
  Laboratory rainfall simulator
