= Meta Department =

Department of Colombia

Department of Meta Departamento del Meta
- Department
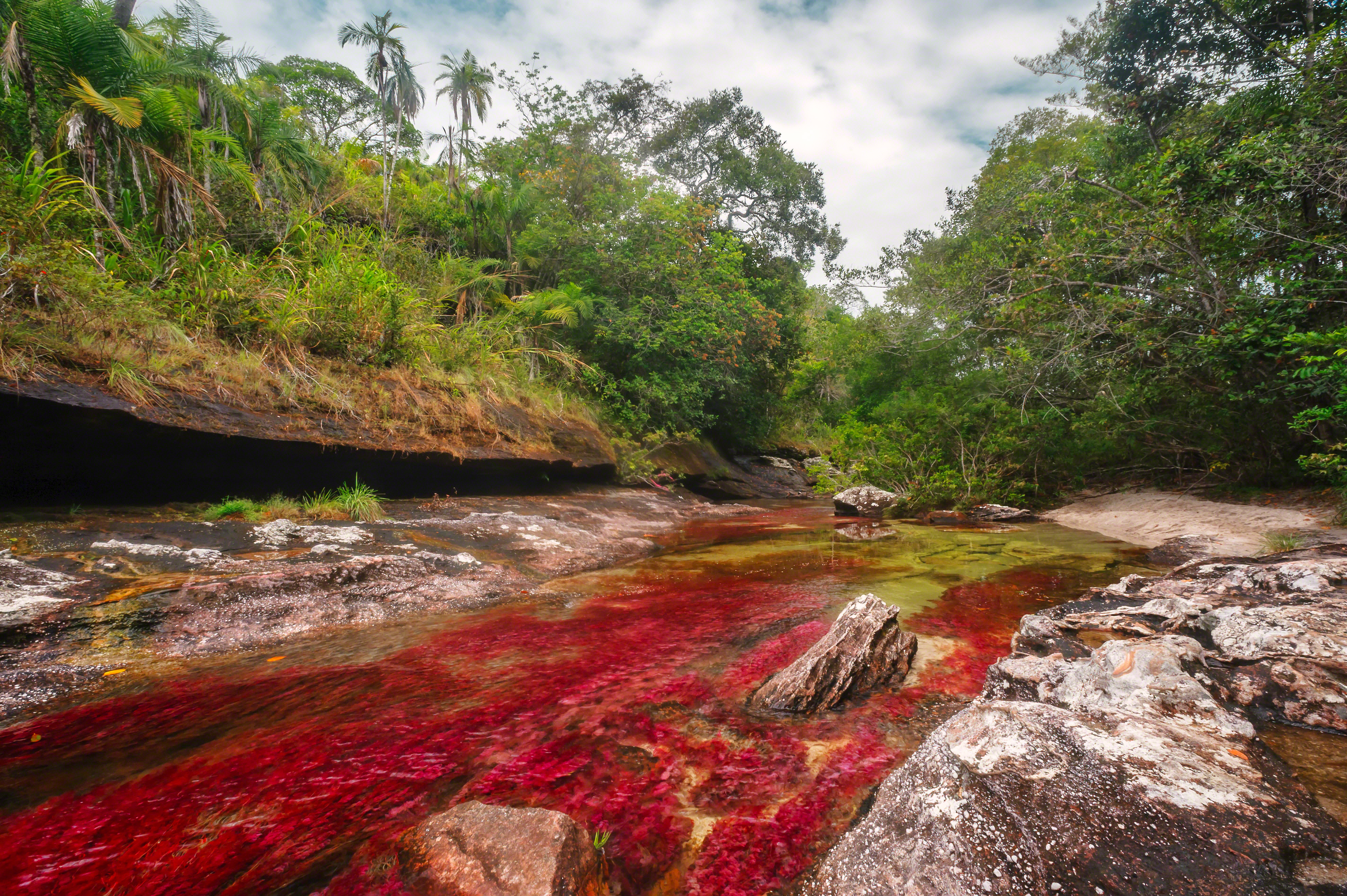
- View of the Caño Cristales

- Flag Coat of arms
- Motto: Llano Grande de Colombia y Meta
- Anthem: "Ay Mi Llanura"
- Meta shown in red

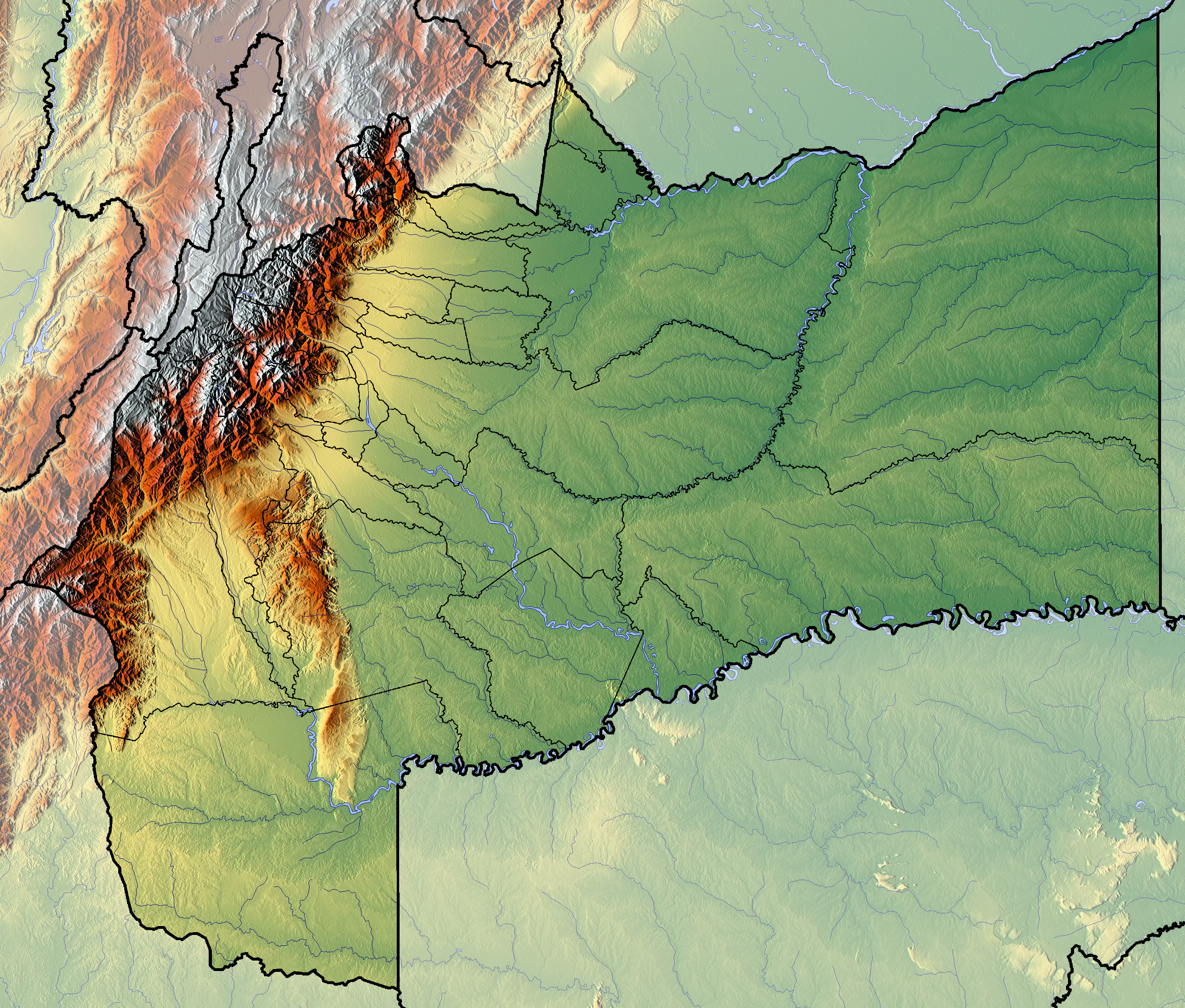
- Topography of the department
- Coordinates: 4°9′N 73°38′W
- Country: Colombia
- Region: Orinoquía Region
- Established: July 1, 1960
- Capital: Villavicencio

Government
  - Governor: Marcela Amaya (2016-2019)

Area
  - Total: 85,635 km^{2} (33,064 sq mi)
  - Rank: 4th

Population (2018)
  - Total: 1,039,722
  - Rank: 19th
  - Density: 12.141/km^{2} (31.446/sq mi)

GDP
  - Total: COP 58,440 billion (US$ 13.7 billion)
- Time zone: UTC-05
- ISO 3166 code: CO-MET
- Provinces: 4
- Municipalities: 29
- HDI: 0.798 high · 7th of 33
- Website: meta.gov.co

Meta Department (Spanish pronunciation: [ˈmeta]) is one of the 32 departments that compose the Republic of Colombia. Largely located within the country's Orinoquía natural region and covered by the Llanos, it is close to the geographic center of the country, east of the Andes mountains. Its capital is the city of Villavicencio.

== History ==
Meta was established as a department on 1 July 1960.

Meta was a department particularly effected by the violence of the Colombian conflict, with large areas being under the control of the FARC before the 2016 peace deal.

In May 2021, flooding affected over 5,400 people and 1,100 homes in the department when the Meta River rose to 8.73 metres (28.6 ft).

== Geography ==
Meta Department is close to the geographic center of Colombia, largely located within the country's Orinoquía natural region. It is east of the Andes mountains. A significant portion of the department is a part of the Llanos, a grassland plain. The homonymous Meta River forms the northeastern border. It is bordered by Cundinamarca, Casanare, Vichada, Caquetá, Guaviare, and Huila Departments.

Parts of Chiribiquete Park, Tinigua National Natural Park, La Macarena National Natural Park, and Caño Cristales are located in the department.

It has an area of 85,635 square kilometres (33,064 sq mi), 7.49% of the country.

== Municipalities ==
Meta Department is composed of 29 municipalities across 4 subregions. Its capital city is Villavicencio.

Ariari	Villavicencio	Piedemonte	Meta River
El Castillo • El Dorado • Fuente de Oro • Granada • La Uribe • Lejanías • Mapiripán • Mesetas • Puerto Concordia • Puerto Lleras • Puerto Rico • San Juan de Arama • Vista Hermosa	Villavicencio	Acacías • Barranca de Upía • Castilla la Nueva • Cubarral • Cumaral • El Calvario • Guamal • Restrepo • San Carlos de Guaroa • San Juanito • San Martín	Cabuyaro • La Macarena • Puerto Gaitán • Puerto López

== Demographics ==
As of the 2018 Colombian census, Meta Department had a total population of 1,039,722 people. In 2022, it had a Human Development Index of 0.769.

The indigenous Sikuani, Jiw, Guayupe peoples are among those who inhabit the department.

Historical population
Year	Pop.	±%
1973	242,664	—
1985	474,046	+95.4%
1993	618,427	+30.5%
2005	783,168	+26.6%
2018	1,039,722	+32.8%
2023	1,088,749	+4.7%

Achagua, which is similar to Piapoco, is an Indigenous language spoken by a minority in the department.

== Government ==
Like all departments in Colombia, Meta has a Governor and a Departmental Assembly.

== Economy ==
Historically, the department's economy has been dependent on oil and gas. In the early 2020s, the national and departmental government began an effort to focus on and invest in tourism centered around its natural attractions.

In 2022, Meta Department had a GDP of 58,439.5 billion Colombian pesos.

== Symbols ==
The flag of Meta has 17 horizontal stripes (nine green, eight white), representing Meta's place as the seventeenth department created in Colombia.

The department has a monument marking the exact geographic center of Colombia, in a place known as Alto de Menegua, a few kilometers from Puerto López.

== See also ==
- San Martín Territory
