= Guamal, Meta =

Coordinates: 3.88°N 73.7656°W

- Municipality and town
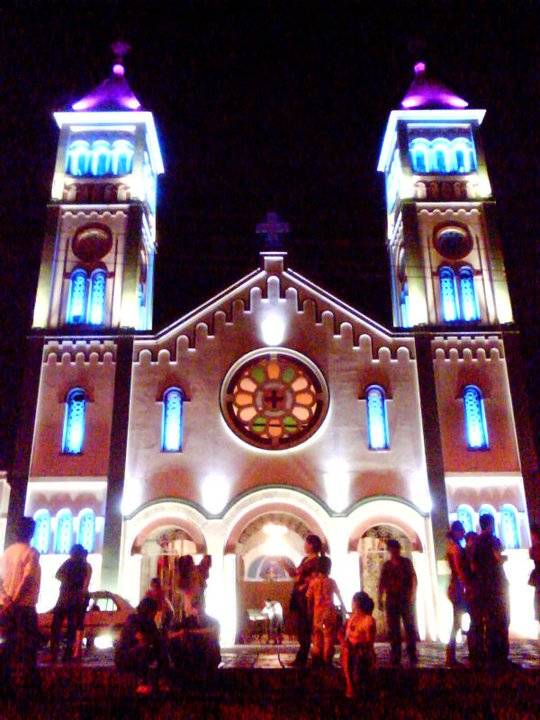

- Flag Coat of arms

- Location of the municipality and town of Guamal, Meta in the Meta Department of Colombia.
- Country: Colombia
- Department: Meta Department

Area
  - Total: 638 km^{2} (246 sq mi)
- Elevation: 525 m (1,722 ft)

Population (Census 2018)
  - Total: 13,857
  - Density: 21.7/km^{2} (56.3/sq mi)
- Time zone: UTC-5 (Colombia Standard Time)
- Climate: Af

Guamal is a town and municipality in the Meta Department, Colombia.

== Climate ==
Guamal has a tropical rainforest climate (Köppen Af). The climate is hot and sometimes humid, though its proximity to the foothills of the Oriental Andes brings mild breezes at nightfall. Average temperature is 25.1 °C or 77.2 °F. Although January is almost dry enough for tropical monsoon (Am) classification, the other eleven months all receive over 125 millimetres or 5 inches of rain, and for eight months from April to November monthly rainfall consistently exceeds 340 millimetres or 13.4 inches.

Climate data for Guamal
Month	Jan	Feb	Mar	Apr	May	Jun	Jul	Aug	Sep	Oct	Nov	Dec	Year
Mean daily maximum °C (°F)	31.0 (87.8)	31.4 (88.5)	31.1 (88.0)	30.0 (86.0)	29.5 (85.1)	29.0 (84.2)	28.9 (84.0)	29.7 (85.5)	30.2 (86.4)	30.1 (86.2)	30.1 (86.2)	30.3 (86.5)	30.1 (86.2)
Daily mean °C (°F)	25.6 (78.1)	26.0 (78.8)	26.0 (78.8)	25.2 (77.4)	24.9 (76.8)	24.3 (75.7)	24.2 (75.6)	24.6 (76.3)	25.0 (77.0)	25.0 (77.0)	25.1 (77.2)	25.0 (77.0)	25.1 (77.1)
Mean daily minimum °C (°F)	20.2 (68.4)	20.6 (69.1)	21.0 (69.8)	20.4 (68.7)	20.4 (68.7)	19.7 (67.5)	19.6 (67.3)	19.5 (67.1)	19.8 (67.6)	20.0 (68.0)	20.2 (68.4)	19.7 (67.5)	20.1 (68.2)
Average rainfall mm (inches)	69.0 (2.72)	126.7 (4.99)	254.0 (10.00)	484.8 (19.09)	575.3 (22.65)	512.6 (20.18)	395.5 (15.57)	344.8 (13.57)	376.8 (14.83)	440.3 (17.33)	488.2 (19.22)	167.6 (6.60)	4,235.6 (166.75)
Average rainy days (≥ 1 mm)	6	8	12	19	22	22	20	17	16	17	16	10	185
Source 1:
Source 2:
