= El Dorado, Meta =

Coordinates: 3.74167°N 73.8389°W

- Municipality and town
- Flag

- Location of the municipality and town of El Dorado, Meta in the Meta Department of Colombia
- Country: Colombia
- Department: Meta Department
- Elevation: 550 m (1,800 ft)
- Time zone: UTC-5 (Colombia Standard Time)
- Climate: Af

El Dorado is a town and municipality in the Meta Department, Colombia.
