= Villavicencio =

- Municipality and city
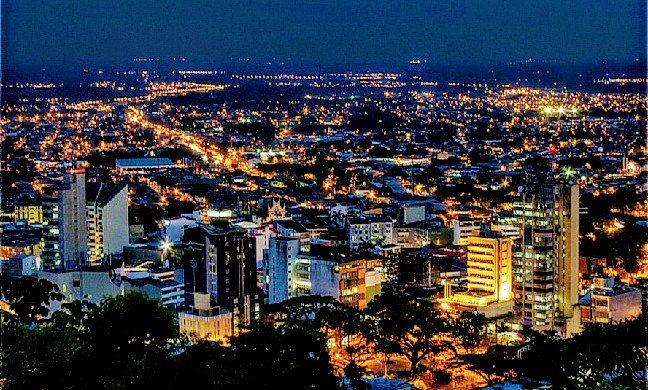
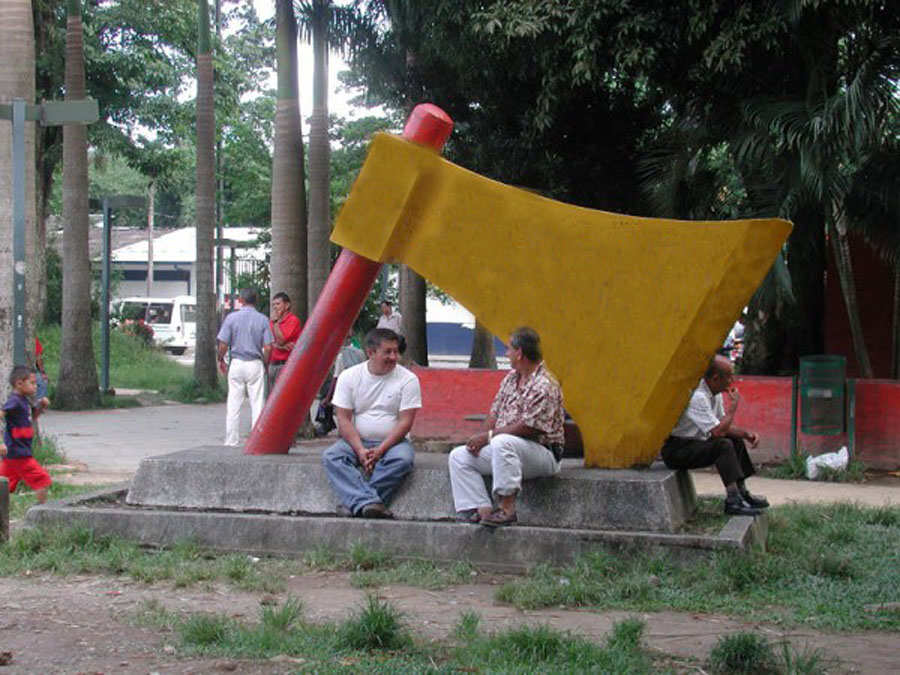
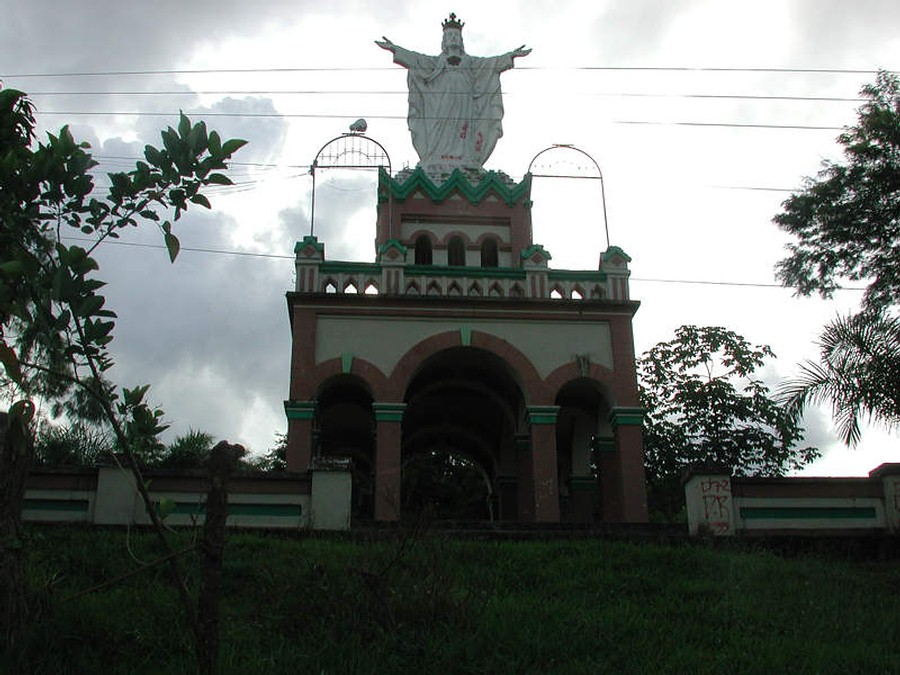
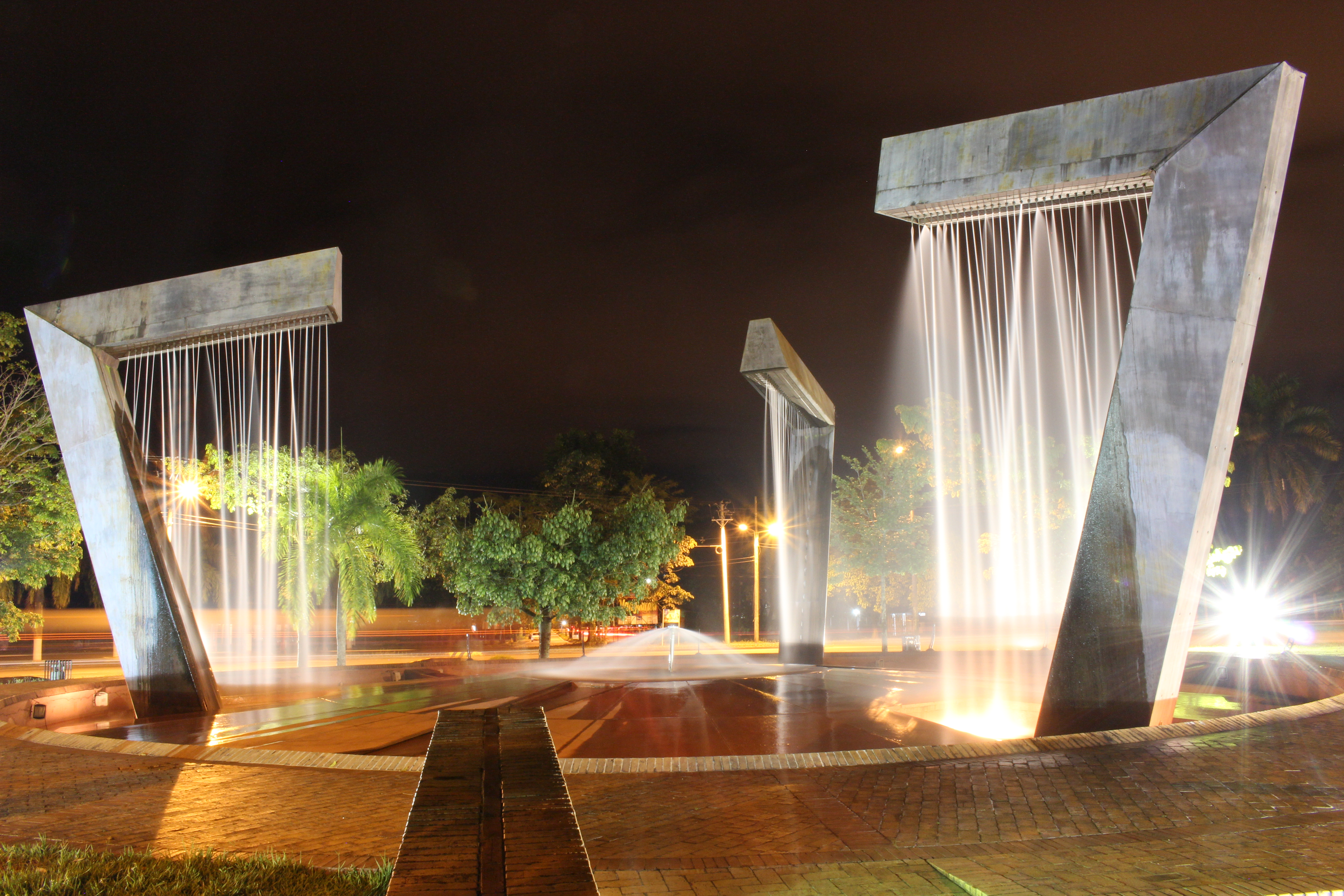
- From the top: Panoramic, The axe Park, Christ the King Monument, The harps monument

- Flag Coat of arms
- Nicknames: Puerta del Llano (Gate of the Plain); Villavo la bella (Villavo the beautiful); La Capital de la tierra Llanera (The Capital of the Llanera Land); El Corazón del Este (The Heart of the East)
- Location map of the municipality and city of Villavicencio in the Department of Meta.

- Location in Colombia
- Coordinates: 4°9′N 73°38′W
- Country: Colombia
- Region: Orinoquía
- Department: Department of Meta
- Founded: 1840

Government
  - Mayor: Alexander Baquero Sanabria

Area
  - Municipality and city: 1,328 km^{2} (513 sq mi)
  - Urban: 65.83 km^{2} (25.42 sq mi)
- Elevation: 467 m (1,532 ft)

Population (2018 Census)
  - Municipality and city: 585,858
  - Density: 441.2/km^{2} (1,143/sq mi)
  - Urban: 545,528
  - Urban density: 8,287/km^{2} (21,460/sq mi)
- Demonym: Villavicense
- Time zone: UTC-05 (Eastern Time Zone)
- Area code: +57 (8)
- Climate: Af
- Website: Official website (in Spanish)

Villavicencio (Latin American Spanish pronunciation: [biʝaβiˈsensjo]) is a city and municipality in Colombia. The capital of Meta Department, it was founded on April 6, 1840. The municipality had a population of 531,275 in 2018. The city is located at 4°08'N, 73°40'W, 75 km (about 45 mi) southeast of the Colombian capital city of Bogotá (DC) by the Guatiquía River. It is the most important commercial center in the Llanos Orientales (eastern plains) of Colombia.

Villavicencio has a hot and very wet climate, with average daily temperatures ranging from 21 to 30 °C (70 to 86 °F) and an annual rainfall of around 4,500 millimetres or 180 inches. It is affectionately called "Villavo la bella". Villavicencio lies on the great Colombian-Venezuelan plain called the Llanos, situated to the east of the Andes mountains. Villavicencio is also called "La Puerta al Llano", or "The Gateway to the Plains", due to its location on the historical path from the Colombian interior to the vast savannas that lie between the Andes range and the Amazon rainforest.

Villavicencio's proximity to huge mountains and great plains make the city an example of Colombia's geodiversity. Because it is located in the foothills of the Andes, the morning and evening breezes cool the city, which is very hot for most of the day.

== History ==
The German Conquistador Nikolaus Federmann reached the altiplano of Bogotá in 1536 by approaching it from the plains of Venezuela, a large unsettled area that is formed by the Orinoco basin. However, the vast area of these plains remained unexplored and uncolonized for the next 300 years. Colombia was settled along the mountainous folds of the Magdalena and Cauca valleys, and its commerce with the outside world was oriented towards the Caribbean Sea, thus, because of its mountainous barriers, the extreme heat, and inhospitable climate, the Llanos remained forgotten and unsettled for many decades.

The Llaneros, the inhabitants of the plains, are fierce horsemen who first fought for the Spanish royalists and then for the Venezuelan and Colombian rebels during the War of Independence. During independence, they crossed the Cordillera Oriental with Simón Bolívar, and surprised the royalist army on the plains of Boyaca on the 6th of August, 1819, which cleared the way for the taking of an abandoned Santa Fe de Bogotá the next week.

In the 1840s, some farmers from Caqueza, a town on the eastern folds of Bogotá, started the modest settlement of Gramalote, which would officially become the parish of Villavicencio in 1855. The parish was named for Antonio Villavicencio, a patriot in the Colombian war of independence. Vaccines, a mule road, and the availability of vast areas of free land, drove new colonizers to continue the settlement of Villavicencio. As the roads improved the access to the Llanos, the farmers could send their produce and cattle to the markets of Bogotá.

In 1948, large landowners expelled many farmers out of their lands across the country, explained in part by the momentum of the assassination of Jorge Eliecer Gaitan, a popular Liberal politician. The Llaneros resisted by driving the army out of population centers. The guerrillas never took Villavicencio, but they brought the fighting to the military base of Apiay. As the fighting between the government and the Llanero guerrillas was out of control, a military coup in June 1953, took Gustavo Rojas Pinilla to power who immediately negotiated a cease fire and amnesty for the insurgents.

=== 1948–present ===
Villavicencio has grown from a small settlement of no more than 20 people in the 1850s to a settlement of over 500,000 inhabitants in 2018. A new road of bridges and tunnels has shortened the driving time to Bogotá from two or three hours, depending on the season of the year, to one and half hours to move the oil, cattle, and agricultural products faster.

== Geography ==
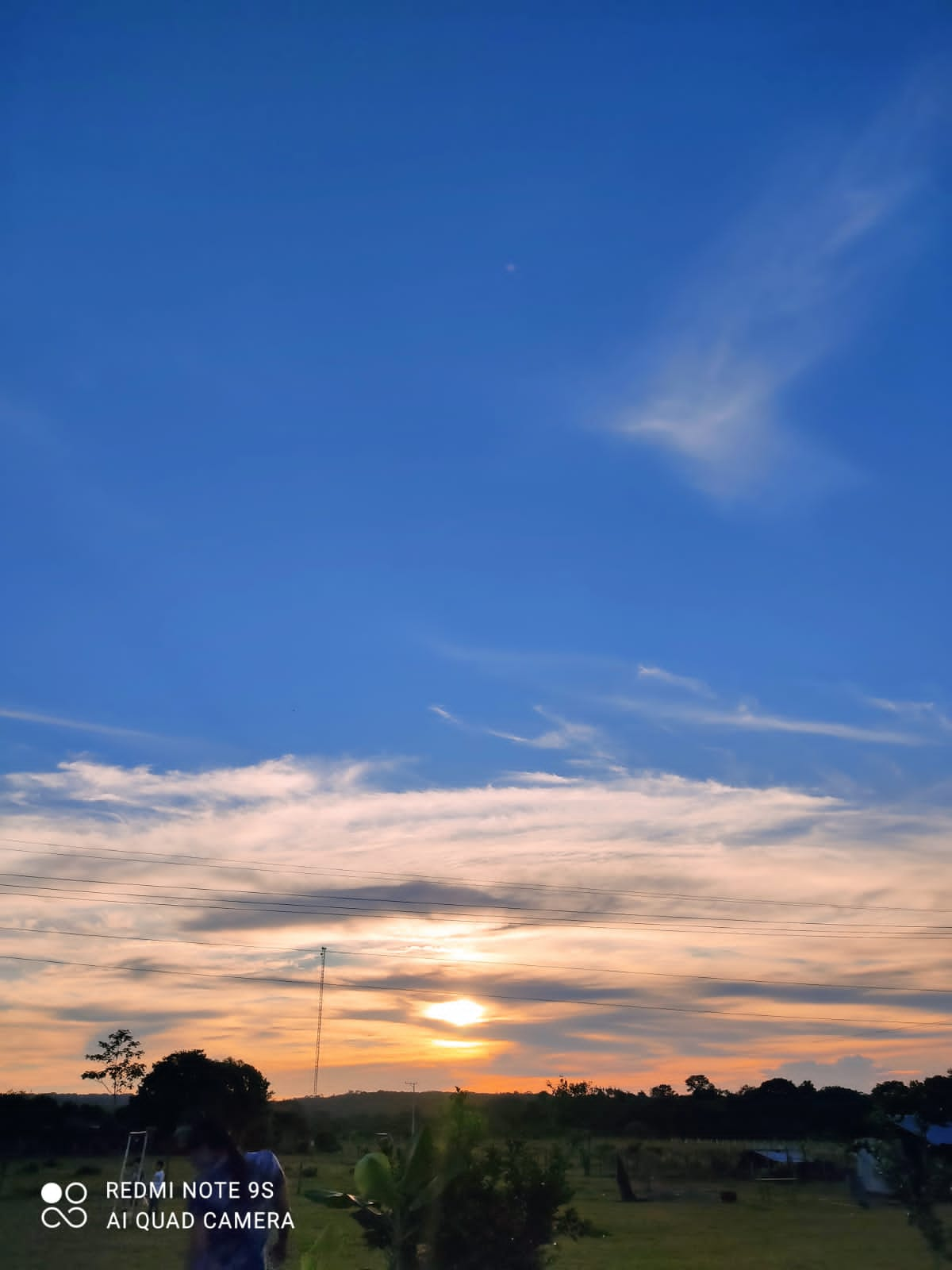
Sunset villavicencio

The city is located in the Orinoquia region, where the Oriental Plains begin. Most of the city's land is flat ground draining away from the Andes. The Guatiquia borders the city to the north and east. Caqueza and Chipaque are located northwest of Villavicencio. A true portal to the Llanos, the roads south of Villavicencio lead to Acacias and San Martin, the first historical town of the Llanos, which was an early Jesuit settlement. East of Villavo they point towards Apiay, Puerto Lopez and the fluvial port of Orocue on the Meta river, a strong affluent of the Orinoco.

== Hydrography ==
Villavicencio, capital of the Department of Meta, lies on the slopes of the Eastern Cordillera a few blocks from the mighty Guatiquía River, surrounded by streams and creeks such as the Parrado and Gramalote, the Ocoa to the east and the Negro and Guayuriba rivers to the south. Among the main tributaries that irrigate the jurisdiction of Villavicencio are the Guatiquía, Guayuriba, Negro and Ocoa rivers.

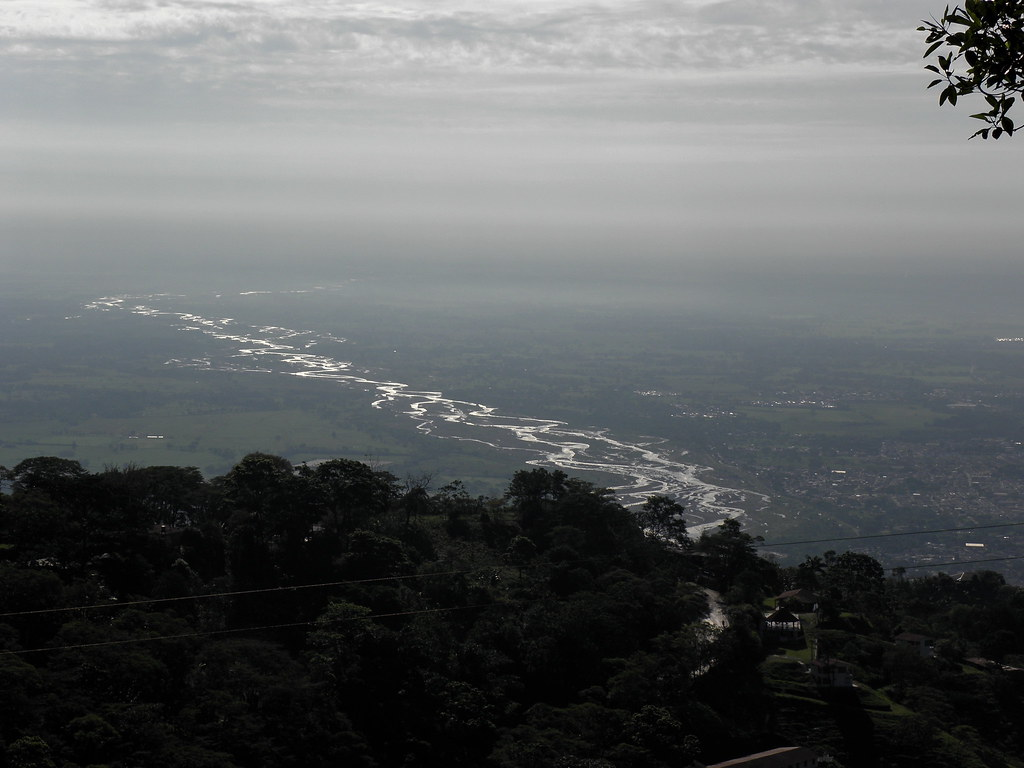
GUATIQUIA RIVER

== Climate ==
Villavicencio has a tropical rainforest climate (Köppen Af). The climate is hot and sometimes humid, though its proximity to the foothills of the Oriental Andes brings mild breezes to the city at nightfall. Average temperature is 25.6 °C or 78.1 °F. Although January is almost dry enough for tropical monsoon (Am) classification, the other eleven months all receive over 130 millimetres or 5 inches of rain, and for eight months from April to November monthly rainfall consistently exceeds 400 millimetres or 16 inches.

Climate data for Villavicencio (La Vanguardia Airport), elevation 423 m (1,388 ft), (1981–2010)
Month	Jan	Feb	Mar	Apr	May	Jun	Jul	Aug	Sep	Oct	Nov	Dec	Year
Record high °C (°F)	37.2 (99.0)	39.5 (103.1)	37.7 (99.9)	37.5 (99.5)	37.0 (98.6)	35.5 (95.9)	38.0 (100.4)	36.0 (96.8)	36.4 (97.5)	36.9 (98.4)	38.0 (100.4)	37.5 (99.5)	39.5 (103.1)
Mean daily maximum °C (°F)	31.6 (88.9)	32.0 (89.6)	31.4 (88.5)	30.2 (86.4)	29.5 (85.1)	28.7 (83.7)	28.5 (83.3)	29.4 (84.9)	30.3 (86.5)	30.5 (86.9)	30.4 (86.7)	30.7 (87.3)	30.3 (86.5)
Daily mean °C (°F)	26.7 (80.1)	27.2 (81.0)	26.8 (80.2)	25.7 (78.3)	25.2 (77.4)	24.5 (76.1)	24.2 (75.6)	24.9 (76.8)	25.5 (77.9)	25.6 (78.1)	25.6 (78.1)	25.9 (78.6)	25.6 (78.1)
Mean daily minimum °C (°F)	21.3 (70.3)	22.0 (71.6)	22.2 (72.0)	21.6 (70.9)	21.2 (70.2)	20.7 (69.3)	20.3 (68.5)	20.5 (68.9)	20.6 (69.1)	20.9 (69.6)	21.2 (70.2)	21.0 (69.8)	21.1 (70.0)
Record low °C (°F)	15.0 (59.0)	16.0 (60.8)	18.0 (64.4)	18.0 (64.4)	16.0 (60.8)	15.0 (59.0)	15.0 (59.0)	15.0 (59.0)	16.5 (61.7)	15.0 (59.0)	16.0 (60.8)	16.0 (60.8)	15.0 (59.0)
Average precipitation mm (inches)	63.0 (2.48)	132.2 (5.20)	230.4 (9.07)	520.2 (20.48)	673.8 (26.53)	541.6 (21.32)	460.6 (18.13)	399.6 (15.73)	406.8 (16.02)	498.9 (19.64)	424.5 (16.71)	186.3 (7.33)	4,537.8 (178.65)
Average precipitation days	9	11	16	24	27	27	28	25	22	24	22	15	250
Average relative humidity (%)	68	65	71	79	82	83	82	79	77	79	80	75	77
Mean monthly sunshine hours	170.5	132.8	111.6	111.0	120.9	111.0	114.7	136.4	153.0	161.2	147.0	164.3	1,634.4
Mean daily sunshine hours	5.5	4.7	3.6	3.7	3.9	3.7	3.7	4.4	5.1	5.2	4.9	5.3	4.5
Source: Instituto de Hidrologia Meteorologia y Estudios Ambientales

== Economy ==
In recent years the city has achieved an economic development strengthened by the trade sector, thanks to the dynamics generated by the roads that channel to the interior and the center of the country the agricultural and agro-industrial industry of the Llano, as well as the products entering the region from different parts of Colombia. Construction activity is very important. Gas and oil exploitation in the Apiay field are part of the region's mining activity. Cattle, agriculture, and the exportation of crude oil fuel the Villavicencio economy. Imports from the surrounding area include coffee, bananas, and rice.

La Vanguardia Airport serves Villavicencio with flights to the rest of Colombia on four airlines, including Colombian major airlines Avianca and Latam Colombia.

Villavicencio continues to be the main collection and supply center for the municipalities of Villavicencio and the municipalities of the Colombian Orinoco region, as well as the main oil and gas-producing municipality; however, most of the jobs are being generated in commercial and service activities, that is, in non-productive and non-tradable sectors. Large constructions, roads, financial resources, and tourism revolve around these commercial dynamics and services. This means that the department's contribution to the National GDP is less than 2%, a figure that has been maintained over the last 49 years, that is, from 1960 to 2009.

== Education ==
The city of Villavicencio has a network of public and private institutions that provide and guarantee the right to education at the primary, secondary, technical, and higher education levels. As the hub city of the Eastern Plains, Villavicencio is the main urban university center of the region to which young people from neighboring departments come.

- University of the Llanos is a public university located within Villavicencio. Other higher education institutions include Cooperative University of Colombia, Saint Thomas Aquinas University, Saint Martin University, Uniminuto, UAN.
- Universidad Santo Tomás Offers presential programs, and more than 22 programs in open and distance mode (VUAD), among which are: International Business, Agricultural Business Administration, Civil Engineering, Environmental Engineering, Psychology, Law and Public Accounting. It has High-Quality Institutional Accreditation Res. 01456/29/01/2016.
- Universidad Cooperativa de Colombia: The Universidad Cooperativa de Colombia is an institution of Higher Education founded in 1958, socially owned, which by its origin and organization belongs to the Solidarity Economy sector. It has branches in other cities of the country.
- Unimeta: It has 14 undergraduate programs, 25 specializations, 23 diploma courses, and several extension courses.
- Minuto de Dios University offers the following degree programs and free courses: Social Communication-Journalism, Business Administration, Computer Technology, Graphic Communication Technology, among free courses in Basic Computer Science and Basic Programming.

== Sports ==
The city has a football (soccer) team, the Llaneros fútbol club, which plays in Colombia's second division.

The Colombian Football Federation announced that Villavicencio was to have been one of the venue cities to host the 2016 FIFA Futsal World Cup, however it was replaced by Medellín.

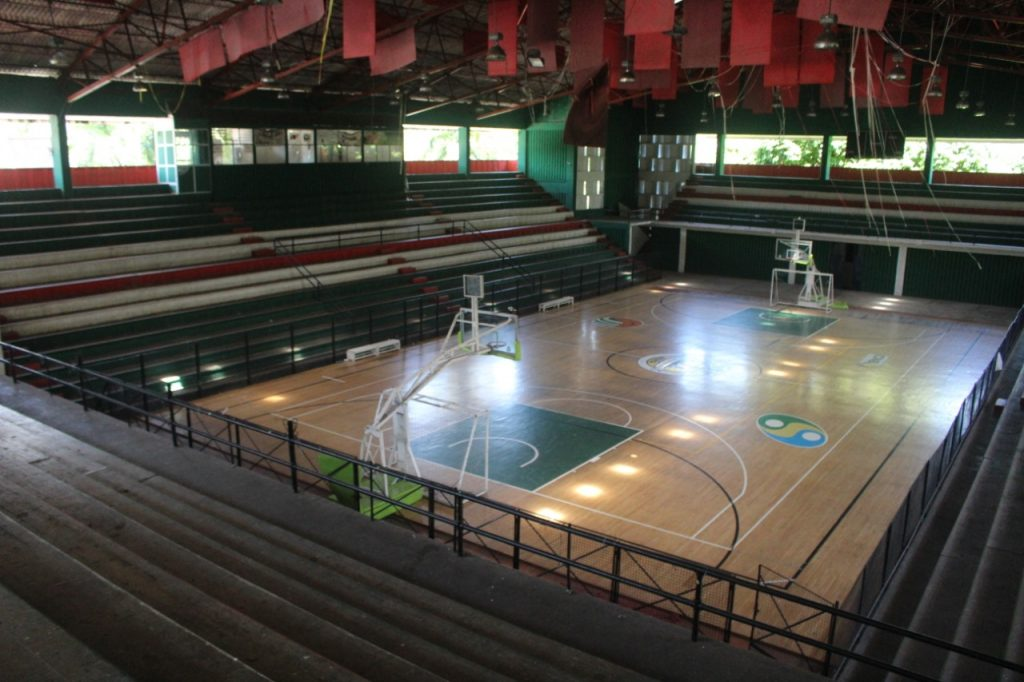
Coliseo Álvaro Mesa Amaya

=== Sports facilities ===
1. Estadio Manuel Calle Lombana
2. Estadio La Esperanza
3. Coliseo Álvaro Mesa Amaya
4. Coliseo La Grama
5. COFREM

== Tourism ==
Villavicencio's tourism activity has been the result of progress in commercial activity and services; in other words, its growth depends on commercial dynamics, the services provided, and the efforts of municipal and departmental administrations. Tourism is carried out in both urban and rural areas (corregimientos) and has grown in both sectors. Due to the growing interest in tourism in the region, the highways have been modernized and improved, shortening the driving time and distance to the capital Bogotá. As a result, Villavicencio and other adjacent municipalities (Acacías, Cubarral, Cumaral, Restrepo, Puerto Lopéz, Puerto Gaitán, Cáqueza) are growing in popularity as tourist destinations. In preparation to meet this demand, tourism development plans and strategies are implemented by the departmental and municipal governments, as well as the Cotelco branch. In relation to physical infrastructure, the city has an acceptable hotel inventory, as well as agro-tourism properties.

=== Monuments ===
- Cristo Rey: This cultural heritage site is located on El Redentor hill, with a height of approximately 30 meters and with the figure of Christ the King, which with his arms outstretched to the sides and looking at the city, symbolizes protection, a cry for peace in times of violence that the territory lived in the 50s.
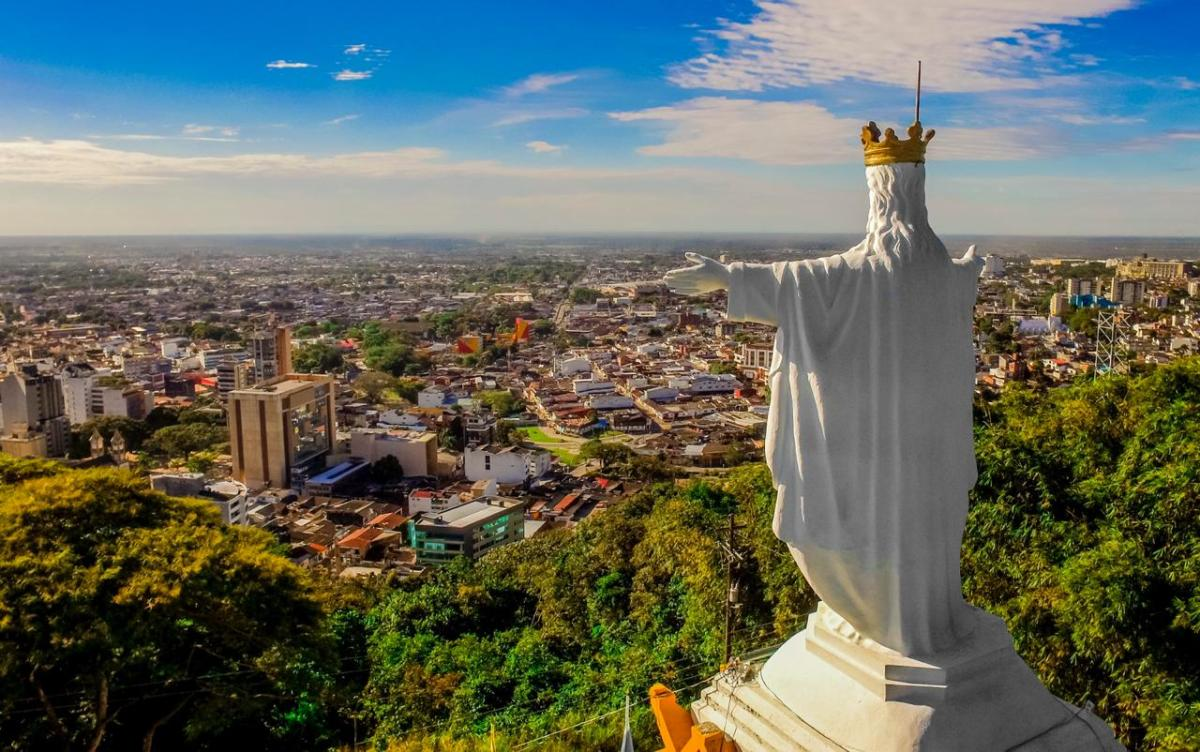
Cristo rey. Photo taken from bluradio.com
- Monument to the Founders: It was the last work of the renowned Colombian sculptor, Rodrigo Arenas Betancourt, is located in the park of the same name on the road that leads from Villavicencio to Acacías.
- Biodiversidad Monument: Represented by a yellow hand with a ring in each of its five fingers, pays homage to the natural heritage of the Eastern Plains Region. Meta department, rich in ecosystems, flora and fauna, proudly shows respect for its characteristic biodiversity.
- Waterfalls: Meta is considered one of the best departments in Colombia to enjoy tourism, given the variety of flora, fauna, culture, and gastronomy that characterizes it. In addition to the unique experience that can be lived by the natural waterfalls with which it counts.
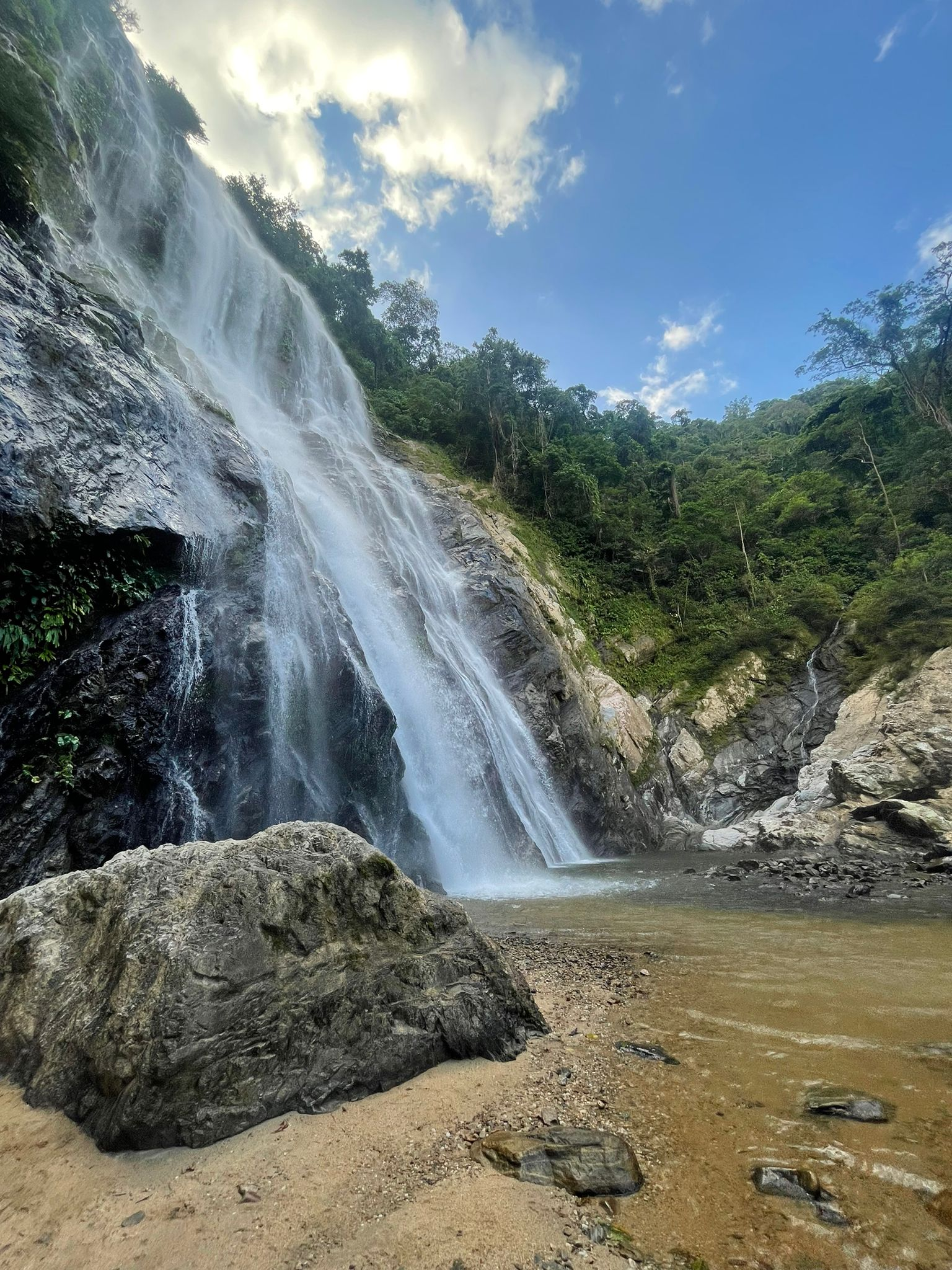
A waterfalls in Granada, Meta
- Los Ocarros Biopark: Located on the road leading to Restrepo and Cumaral, around the lake formed by the waters of the Vanguardia stream and as a gateway to the nature reserve of the same name. It is the only zoological institution in the country dedicated exclusively to the preservation of regional natural wealth, which brings together the biodiversity of fauna, flora, and ecosystems of the Colombian Orinoco region. Exclusively flora and fauna of the region, highlighting the serpentarium, the giant armadillos or ocarros, the Orinoco caiman, and the spectacled bear.

== Festival ==
Villavicencio is the capital of the Llanos Orientales and celebrates its anniversary every April 6 to pay tribute to its history and culture. This is an event where the city attracts much more tourism as artistic events such as concerts, parades, fairs, as well as sports competitions and fireworks are held. All activities are free and all are welcome to attend.

Concurso mundial de la Mujer Vaquera

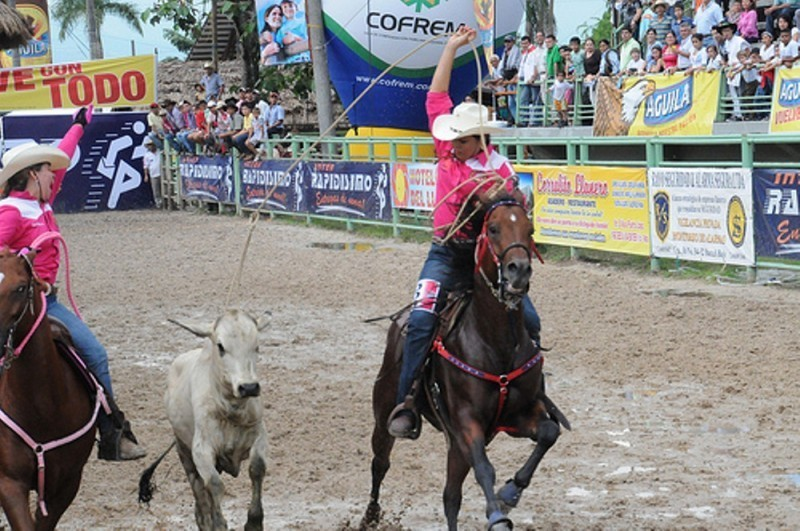
Encuentro mundial de la mujer vaquera

Occurring annually in Las Malocas Park, participants demonstrate their skills in llano work and rodeo, and where llanera music is also performed by top musicians of this Colombian-Venezuelan genre. This event is in March, Women's Month and lasts three days, it is dedicated to exalting the skills of the llanera women and also summons other sportswomen from other countries. The llanera women compete in different events such as milking, agility and dexterity in horse riding, saddling, and rein handling.

International Joropo Tournament (Villavicencio):

The International Joropo Tournament is the most important cultural and artistic event in the region of Meta. It is held in the first week of July and lasts 5 days. As part of this event, the anniversary of the department is also celebrated. Highlights of the event include the international joropo beauty pageant, competitions such as voice passage, contrapunteo, best artist, best maraquero, best harpist, unpublished voice and unpublished song. The so-called Joropódromo is held in the streets of Villavicencio where more than 3,000 couples gather to dance the joropo dance, a traditional dance of the region.

== Parks ==
=== The periodistas Park ===
It was previously named Infantilpark. It is a landmark of the foundation of the city, which occurred around 1842. The park is surrounded by a group of colorful houses from the 19th century, by restaurant and cafes and by trees that lavish shadow and freshness.

=== The Hacha Park ===
The actual name of this central park is Jose Eustacio Rivera, but people in Villavicencio call it Hacha Park because of the monument that presides it. The place pays tribute to the author of The Vortex, while the ax refers to the early settlers that used this tool to open the trails in Meta and change the land.

=== Los Centauros Plaza ===
It is located in the center of Villavicencio and surrounded by leafy trees, is a pleasant walking area. It takes its name from the sculpture made by the artist Patricia Vilduvieso and Luis Enrique Ballen. The art piece pays a tribute to the plains cowboys who is totally assimilated with his horse.

== Culture ==
Villavicencio shares the condition of land of immigrants with the region of the Eastern Plains of Colombia; from its foundation to the present, people from the interior of the country and the coasts have sought and found in the city the conditions and the receptivity to establish themselves; At the same time, they have contributed to forge a mestizo culture in which, nevertheless, they struggle to impose a stronger relationship with the region, a bond of identity with the llanera culture. Mamona, coleo, cockfighting, joropo, dance, legends, myth, the renewed and popularized use of the poncho, among others are currently struggling not to disappear before the thrust of urban or modern life. Folklore is made up of the traditional customs of the people.

=== Gastronomy ===
In Villavicencio the typical dishes are in turn representative of the gastronomy of the Eastern Plains.

==== Carne a la Llanera (mamona or veal) ====
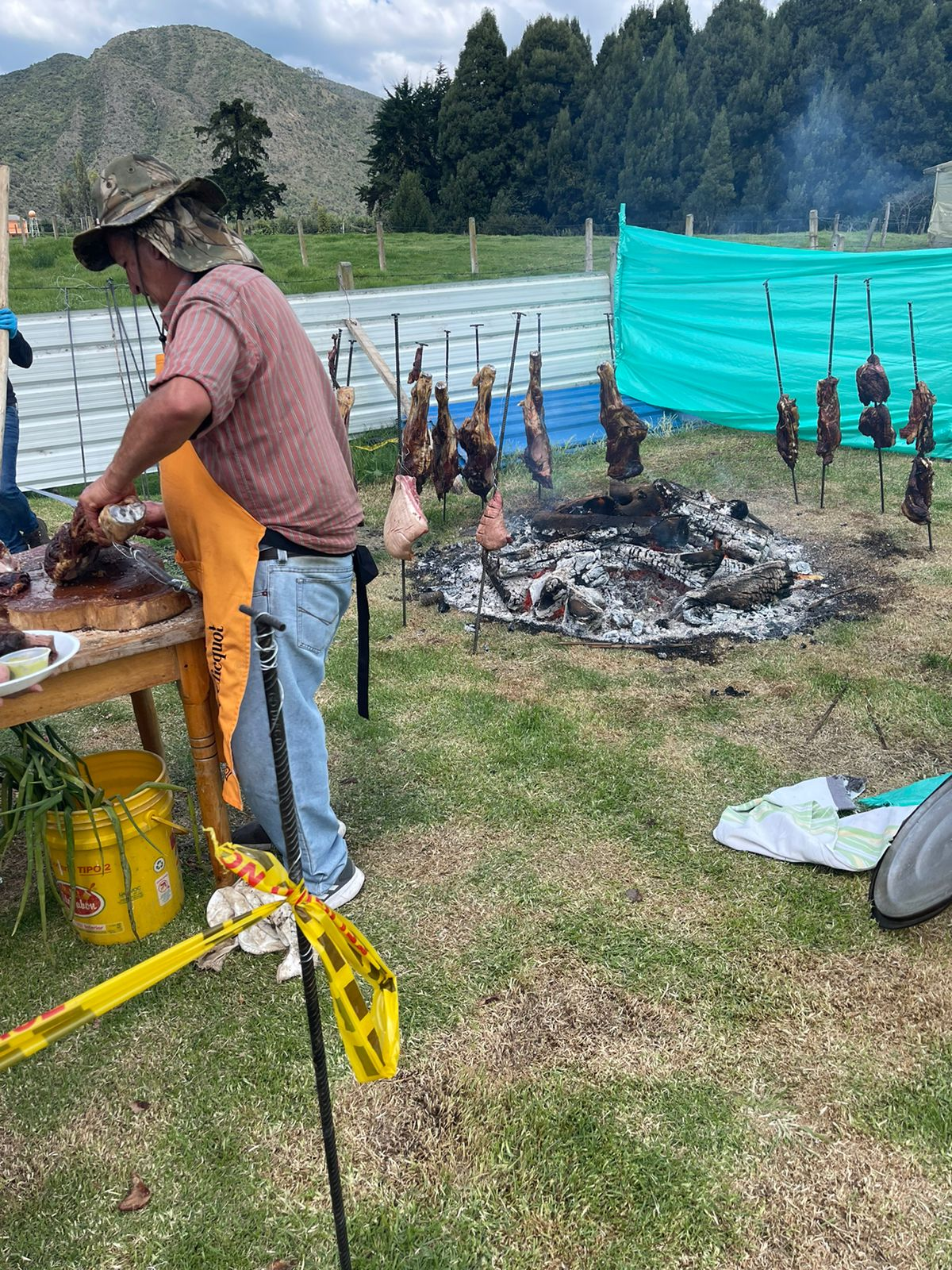
The classic bonfire is round for cooking meat.

Veal roasted in wood and marinated only with salt and beer. It is served with cassava, potatoes, and plantains; optionally it is accompanied by a stew or sauce based on chili and a beer or lemonade based on panela. In the city, there is a wide variety of restaurants and grills that offer several typical dishes of the region. This dish is also known as Mamona or Ternera a la Llanera, due to the fact that it uses veal, which is slaughtered when the cow is still suckling. This is the most representative dish of the Llanos region, in such a way that it can be found in other parts of the country. The citizen who is living in Villavicencio is used to cook of meat during festivals and parties. It is common for Villavicences to eat this kind of meat in Joropodromo, at birthday parties, meetings.

==== Arepas and breads ====
Rice arepas, rice bread, cassava bread, corn and corn wrapped, tungos, fish dish, three-phase sancocho, pâté broth, minced soup, pajarilla broth.

==== Rice bread ====
The rice bread is a snack made with rice and curd which is currently carrying a special safeguard plan before the Ministry of Culture of Colombia and also through the Association of bread producers and marketers of Rice Meta (ASPAMET) with the help of the Chamber of Commerce of Villavicencio, are promoting the product to aspire to have a designation of origin before the Superintendence of Industry and Commerce of Colombia, rice bread is an important link in the cuisine of Villavicencio, currently is the municipality where this food is sold the most locally, nationally and internationally, the most traditional bakery and former rice bread producer is Rosquipan since 1990.

==== Drinks ====
Guarulo, Masato, Lemonade with panela, Guarapo de Piña and the coffee cerrero. In addition to the typical liquors such as Aguardiente Llanero and Ron San Martín Añejo.

== Notable people ==
- Cato Ekrene, film director
- Carolina Gaitán, Colombian television actress
- William Pulido, former professional cyclist
- Luis Ariel Rey, musician and songwriter
- Óscar Ruiz, former football referee and lawyer
- Nathalia Sánchez, gymnast
