= Lejanías =

Tierra del Perro
- Municipality and town
- Flag

- Location of the municipality and town of Lejanías in the Meta Department of Colombia.
- Coordinates: 3°31′36.50″N 74°1′23.60″W
- Country: Colombia
- Department: Meta Department

Area
  - Total: 852 km^{2} (329 sq mi)
- Elevation: 670–750 m (2,200–2,460 ft)

Population (Census 2018)
  - Total: 10,576
  - Density: 12.4/km^{2} (32.1/sq mi)
- Time zone: UTC-5 (Colombia Standard Time)
- Climate: Af
- Website: http://lejanias-meta.gov.co/index.shtml

Lejanías is a town and municipality in the Meta Department, Colombia.

== Climate ==
Lejanías has a tropical rainforest climate (Köppen Af) with heavy to extremely heavy rainfall year round.

Climate data for Lejanías, elevation 680 m (2,230 ft), (1981–2010)
| Month | Jan | Feb | Mar | Apr | May | Jun | Jul | Aug | Sep | Oct | Nov | Dec | Year |
|---|---|---|---|---|---|---|---|---|---|---|---|---|---|
| Mean daily maximum °C (°F) | 29.6 (85.3) | 29.8 (85.6) | 29.0 (84.2) | 28.0 (82.4) | 27.5 (81.5) | 26.9 (80.4) | 26.8 (80.2) | 27.7 (81.9) | 28.4 (83.1) | 28.3 (82.9) | 28.1 (82.6) | 28.5 (83.3) | 28.2 (82.8) |
| Daily mean °C (°F) | 24.4 (75.9) | 24.9 (76.8) | 24.2 (75.6) | 23.4 (74.1) | 23.0 (73.4) | 22.5 (72.5) | 22.2 (72.0) | 22.9 (73.2) | 23.4 (74.1) | 23.4 (74.1) | 23.4 (74.1) | 23.7 (74.7) | 23.4 (74.1) |
| Mean daily minimum °C (°F) | 19.4 (66.9) | 19.9 (67.8) | 20.2 (68.4) | 19.9 (67.8) | 19.8 (67.6) | 19.3 (66.7) | 18.9 (66.0) | 19.2 (66.6) | 19.4 (66.9) | 19.7 (67.5) | 19.7 (67.5) | 19.4 (66.9) | 19.6 (67.3) |
| Average precipitation mm (inches) | 60.1 (2.37) | 114.6 (4.51) | 250.2 (9.85) | 463.1 (18.23) | 513.8 (20.23) | 478.2 (18.83) | 409.4 (16.12) | 327.5 (12.89) | 327.0 (12.87) | 369.0 (14.53) | 292.1 (11.50) | 114.0 (4.49) | 3,699.9 (145.67) |
| Average precipitation days | 6 | 8 | 15 | 23 | 26 | 25 | 25 | 22 | 20 | 21 | 19 | 11 | 220 |
| Average relative humidity (%) | 79 | 78 | 82 | 86 | 87 | 88 | 88 | 86 | 85 | 85 | 86 | 83 | 84 |
Source: Instituto de Hidrologia Meteorologia y Estudios Ambientales
