= Guatiquía River =

River in Colombia

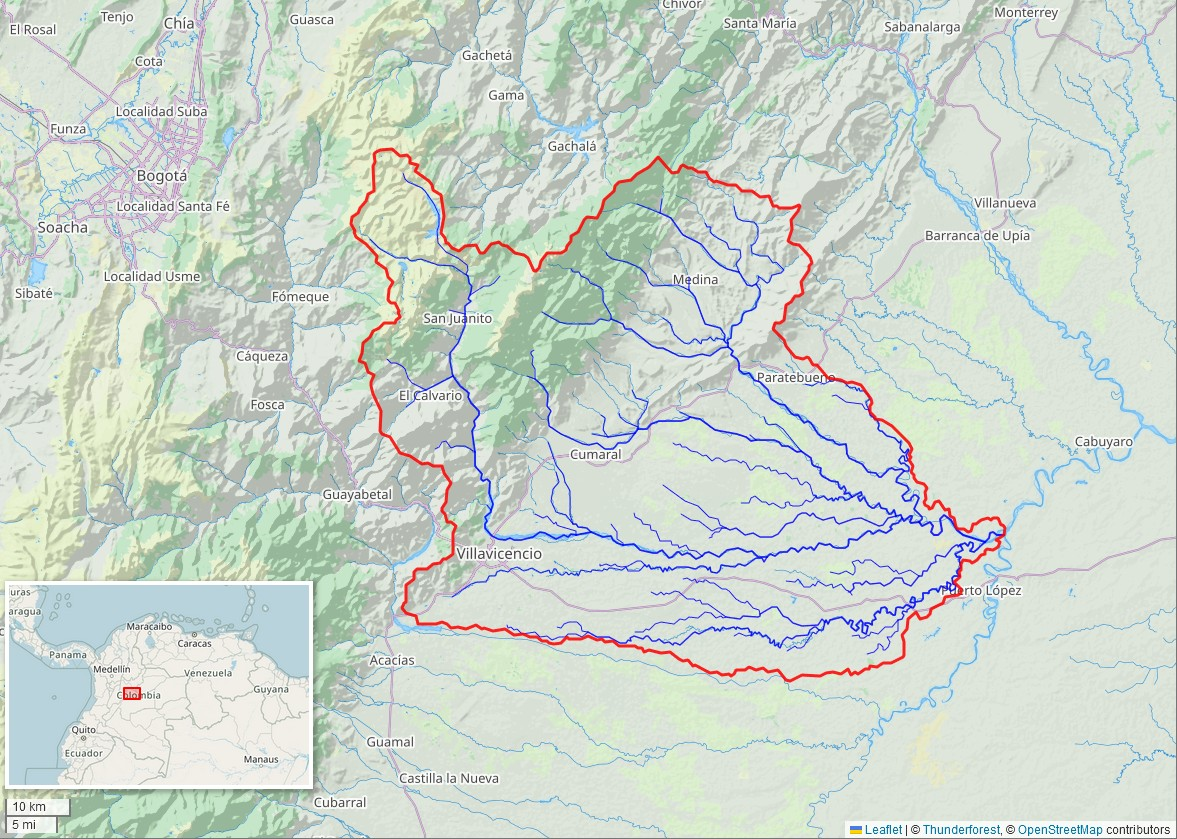
- Guatiquía River watershed (Interactive map)

- Location of mouth

Location
- Country: Colombia

Physical characteristics
- Source: Chingaza páramo
  - location: Chingaza Natural National Park, Cundinamarca, Colombia
  - elevation: 3,500 m (11,500 ft)
- Mouth: Río Meta
  - location: Colombia
  - coordinates: 4.160°N 72.927°W
  - elevation: 170 m (560 ft)
- Basin size: 4,900 km^{2} (1,900 sq mi)

The Guatiquía River (Spanish: río Guatiquía) originates on the Chingaza páramo at 3,500 metres (11,500 ft), from its roots in the jurisdiction of the municipio of Quetame (department of Cundinamarca, Colombia. Until it reaches the eastern plains or Llanos Orientales Colombianos, it forms a long and deep canyon for 137 kilometres (85 mi).

The river splits in two arms taking the names of Río Negrito and Río Guayuriba. Both arms end in the Meta River.

Waters from the Guatiquía eventually flow to the Orinoco River and the Atlantic Ocean.
