= Cubarral =

Coordinates: 3°47′30.71″N 73°50′28.62″W

- Municipality and town
- Flag

- Location of the municipality and town of Cubarral in the Meta Department of Colombia.
- Country: Colombia
- Department: Meta Department
- Elevation: 534 m (1,752 ft)
- Time zone: UTC-5 (Colombia Standard Time)

Cubarral is a town and municipality in the Meta Department, Colombia. The municipality of Guamal borders Cubarral to the north, to the west is bordered by the department of Cundinamarca, to the east by the municipality of San Martín and to the south by the municipality of El Dorado. Furthermore, According to DANE projections from the 2005 census, Cubarral would have a population of approximately 5946 people by 2015.

== Hydrography ==
There are a lot of rivers that cross the municipality of Cubarral, and according to National Environmental Licensing Authority (ANLA) in Spanish, some of the main watercourses are:

- Ariari river
- Humadea river
- Tonoa river

== Climate ==
Cubarral has a tropical rainforest climate (Köppen Af) with heavy to very heavy rainfall year-round.

Climate data for Cubarral
Month	Jan	Feb	Mar	Apr	May	Jun	Jul	Aug	Sep	Oct	Nov	Dec	Year
Mean daily maximum °C (°F)	30.6 (87.1)	31.1 (88.0)	30.9 (87.6)	29.7 (85.5)	29.3 (84.7)	28.8 (83.8)	28.8 (83.8)	29.6 (85.3)	30.0 (86.0)	29.8 (85.6)	29.7 (85.5)	29.9 (85.8)	29.9 (85.7)
Daily mean °C (°F)	25.2 (77.4)	25.7 (78.3)	25.9 (78.6)	24.9 (76.8)	24.8 (76.6)	24.1 (75.4)	24.1 (75.4)	24.5 (76.1)	24.8 (76.6)	24.8 (76.6)	24.8 (76.6)	24.6 (76.3)	24.9 (76.7)
Mean daily minimum °C (°F)	19.9 (67.8)	20.3 (68.5)	20.9 (69.6)	20.2 (68.4)	20.3 (68.5)	19.5 (67.1)	19.4 (66.9)	19.4 (66.9)	19.6 (67.3)	19.9 (67.8)	20.0 (68.0)	19.4 (66.9)	19.9 (67.8)
Average rainfall mm (inches)	109.4 (4.31)	180.5 (7.11)	309.2 (12.17)	605.7 (23.85)	622.1 (24.49)	547.7 (21.56)	440.2 (17.33)	385.3 (15.17)	398.9 (15.70)	504.7 (19.87)	521.6 (20.54)	236.9 (9.33)	4,862.2 (191.43)
Average rainy days (≥ 1 mm)	7	9	13	20	22	22	21	18	17	19	19	11	198
Source 1: IDEAM
Source 2: Climate-Data.org
