= List of municipalities in Mato Grosso by HDI =

This is a list of municipalities in Mato Grosso ordered by Human Development Index (HDI) according to data released by the United Nations Development Program (UNDP) of the United Nations for 2010 (although old, they are the most current data available). The Human Development Index was developed in 1990 by the Pakistani economist Mahbub ul Haq and the Indian economist Amartya Sen.

According to the list. of the 141 municipalities in the state of Mato Grosso, none of them have very high HDI (equal to or greater than 0.800), 49 have high HDI (between 0.700 and 0.799), 89 have medium (between 0.600 and 0.699), 3 have low (between 0.500 and 0.599), and none of them have a very low (less than 0.500). The HDI of the state of Mato Grosso is 0.774 (considered high).

== Criteria ==
Map of HDI of the municipalities of Mato Grosso. Legend: Very high (no municipalities) High (49 municipalities) Medium (89 municipalities) Low (3 municipalities) Very low (no municipalities)

=== Categories ===
The index varies from 0 to 1, considering:

- Very high – 0.800 to 1.000
- High – 0.700 to 0.799
- Medium – 0.600 to 0.699
- Low – 0.500 to 0.599
- Very low – 0.000 to 0.499

=== Components ===
The HDI of the municipalities is an average between the income index, life expectancy index and educational index.

== List ==
Rank	Municipalities	Dados de 2010			
Rank	Municipalities	HDI	Income Index	Life Expectancy Index	Educational Index
Very high HDI
no municipalities
High HDI
1	Cuiabá (capital city)	0.785	0.800	0.834	0.726
2	Lucas do Rio Verde	0.768	0.766	0.833	0.710
3	Nova Mutum	0.758	0.773	0.837	0.673
4	Rondonópolis	0.755	0.749	0.823	0.698
5	Sinop	0.754	0.755	0.832	0.682
6	Primavera do Leste	0.752	0.774	0.843	0.653
7	Campo Verde	0.750	0.755	0.834	0.670
8	Barra do Garças	0.748	0.738	0.817	0.693
9	Sorriso	0.744	0.774	0.839	0.635
10	Campos de Júlio	0.744	0.800	0.825	0.625
11	Jaciara	0.735	0.728	0.833	0.655
12	Santa Rita do Trivelato	0.735	0.738	0.852	0.632
13	Várzea Grande	0.734	0.711	0.842	0.661
14	Campo Novo do Parecis	0.734	0.745	0.819	0.649
15	Pontal do Araguaia	0.734	0.691	0.816	0.702
16	Sapezal	0.732	0.758	0.836	0.620
17	Água Boa	0.729	0.723	0.829	0.646
18	Tangará da Serra	0.729	0.749	0.825	0.626
19	Ipiranga do Norte	0.727	0.742	0.807	0.642
20	Araputanga	0.725	0.704	0.826	0.655
21	São José dos Quatro Marcos	0.719	0.707	0.816	0.643
22	Diamantino	0.718	0.714	0.831	0.625
23	Conquista d'Oeste	0.718	0.707	0.807	0.650
24	Matupá	0.716	0.706	0.824	0.631
25	Juína	0.716	0.733	0.845	0.593
26	Torixoréu	0.716	0.684	0.806	0.666
27	Santa Carmem	0.715	0.703	0.827	0.628
28	Alta Floresta	0.714	0.709	0.817	0.629
29	Juscimeira	0.714	0.678	0.842	0.637
30	Tapurah	0.714	0.738	0.831	0.594
31	Nova Santa Helena	0.714	0.745	0.809	0.603
32	Colíder	0.713	0.732	0.819	0.604
33	Itanhangá	0.710	0.699	0.856	0.597
34	Glória d'Oeste	0.710	0.684	0.823	0.636
35	Cáceres	0.708	0.691	0.813	0.633
36	Rio Branco	0.707	0.701	0.817	0.617
37	Guiratinga	0.705	0.677	0.813	0.637
38	Alto Taquari	0.705	0.736	0.833	0.571
39	Nova Xavantina	0.704	0.713	0.800	0.613
40	Alto Araguaia	0.704	0.712	0.802	0.612
41	Arenápolis	0.704	0.677	0.793	0.649
42	Mirassol d'Oeste	0.704	0.723	0.816	0.592
43	Nova Marilândia	0.704	0.680	0.823	0.623
44	Pontes e Lacerda	0.703	0.711	0.807	0.605
45	Guarantã do Norte	0.703	0.692	0.826	0.609
46	Nortelândia	0.702	0.653	0.793	0.668
47	Marcelândia	0.701	0.700	0.813	0.604
48	Araguainha	0.701	0.650	0.844	0.627
49	Alto Garças	0.701	0.707	0.835	0.583
Medium HDI
50	Cláudia	0.699	0.719	0.809	0.586
51	Nobres	0.699	0.675	0.827	0.611
52	Terra Nova do Norte	0.698	0.692	0.815	0.602
53	Brasnorte	0.696	0.695	0.850	0.571
54	Tabaporã	0.695	0.679	0.826	0.598
55	Itiquira	0.693	0.694	0.812	0.591
56	Barra do Bugres	0.693	0.684	0.818	0.595
57	Canarana	0.693	0.735	0.825	0.549
58	Querência	0.692	0.701	0.837	0.565
59	Feliz Natal	0.692	0.737	0.819	0.548
60	Ribeirãozinho	0.692	0.694	0.802	0.595
61	Nova Monte Verde	0.691	0.690	0.823	0.582
62	Itaúba	0.690	0.714	0.809	0.569
63	Dom Aquino	0.690	0.687	0.806	0.593
64	Curvelândia	0.690	0.658	0.811	0.615
65	Comodoro	0.689	0.687	0.840	0.567
66	Santo Afonso	0.689	0.655	0.834	0.599
67	Chapada dos Guimarães	0.688	0.677	0.833	0.578
68	Vila Rica	0.688	0.709	0.829	0.553
69	Nova Guarita	0.688	0.671	0.812	0.597
70	Araguaiana	0.687	0.671	0.817	0.591
71	Ponte Branca	0.686	0.684	0.806	0.585
72	Nova Canaã do Norte	0.686	0.692	0.815	0.572
73	Porto dos Gaúchos	0.685	0.703	0.815	0.561
74	Santa Cruz do Xingu	0.684	0.704	0.828	0.550
75	Denise	0.683	0.672	0.802	0.590
76	Nova Olímpia	0.682	0.704	0.804	0.561
77	Juara	0.682	0.699	0.836	0.543
78	São José do Rio Claro	0.682	0.689	0.841	0.548
79	Vera	0.680	0.663	0.834	0.568
80	Pedra Preta	0.679	0.672	0.812	0.573
81	Figueirópolis d'Oeste	0.679	0.665	0.786	0.599
82	Poxoréo	0.678	0.653	0.832	0.573
83	Luciara	0.676	0.617	0.788	0.634
84	Reserva do Cabaçal	0.676	0.642	0.799	0.603
85	Aripuanã	0.675	0.682	0.816	0.553
86	Apiacás	0.675	0.666	0.809	0.570
87	Novo Mundo	0.674	0.652	0.815	0.577
88	Jauru	0.673	0.668	0.812	0.563
89	Porto Alegre do Norte	0.673	0.647	0.803	0.587
90	Paranaíta	0.672	0.677	0.809	0.555
91	General Carneiro	0.670	0.645	0.820	0.569
92	Ribeirão Cascalheira	0.670	0.668	0.831	0.542
93	Nova Ubiratã	0.669	0.694	0.816	0.529
94	São Félix do Araguaia	0.668	0.652	0.848	0.538
95	Confresa	0.668	0.660	0.812	0.556
96	Paranatinga	0.667	0.679	0.820	0.532
97	Canabrava do Norte	0.667	0.616	0.817	0.589
98	Salto do Céu	0.666	0.661	0.797	0.560
99	Castanheira	0.665	0.671	0.800	0.547
100	Carlinda	0.665	0.656	0.809	0.553
101	União do Sul	0.665	0.665	0.797	0.556
102	Novo Horizonte do Norte	0.664	0.652	0.820	0.548
103	Serra Nova Dourada	0.664	0.638	0.819	0.560
104	Nova Maringá	0.663	0.702	0.815	0.509
105	Juruena	0.662	0.647	0.797	0.563
106	Indiavaí	0.661	0.645	0.841	0.533
107	São José do Povo	0.661	0.630	0.793	0.577
108	Bom Jesus do Araguaia	0.661	0.665	0.784	0.555
109	São Pedro da Cipa	0.660	0.654	0.790	0.556
110	Cocalinho	0.660	0.674	0.807	0.528
111	São José do Xingu	0.657	0.703	0.828	0.487
112	Vale de São Domingos	0.656	0.658	0.765	0.560
113	Planalto da Serra	0.656	0.615	0.813	0.565
114	Santo Antônio de Leverger	0.656	0.651	0.806	0.539
115	Santo Antônio do Leste	0.655	0.658	0.853	0.501
116	Tesouro	0.655	0.635	0.791	0.560
117	Novo Santo Antônio	0.653	0.640	0.829	0.526
118	Poconé	0.652	0.643	0.806	0.534
119	Porto Esperidião	0.652	0.666	0.795	0.523
120	Nova Brasilândia	0.651	0.673	0.845	0.485
121	Alto Boa Vista	0.651	0.613	0.803	0.561
122	Rosário Oeste	0.650	0.653	0.807	0.520
123	Nova Bandeirantes	0.650	0.696	0.842	0.469
124	Novo São Joaquim	0.649	0.658	0.819	0.507
125	Peixoto de Azevedo	0.649	0.691	0.761	0.521
126	Vila Bela da Santíssima Trindade	0.645	0.644	0.843	0.495
127	Rondolândia	0.640	0.619	0.800	0.530
128	Alto Paraguai	0.638	0.612	0.784	0.541
129	Nossa Senhora do Livramento	0.638	0.600	0.820	0.529
130	Nova Lacerda	0.636	0.643	0.825	0.485
131	Jangada	0.630	0.567	0.805	0.549
132	Acorizal	0.628	0.594	0.816	0.510
133	Lambari d'Oeste	0.627	0.670	0.787	0.467
134	Gaúcha do Norte	0.615	0.658	0.847	0.418
135	Colniza	0.611	0.633	0.815	0.443
136	Santa Terezinha	0.609	0.596	0.761	0.498
137	Cotriguaçu	0.601	0.623	0.825	0.423
138	Barão de Melgaço	0.600	0.598	0.820	0.440
Low HDI
139	Porto Estrela	0.599	0.571	0.804	0.467
140	Nova Nazaré	0.595	0.621	0.793	0.427
141	Campinápolis	0.538	0.597	0.803	0.324
Very low HDI
no municipalities

== See also ==
- Geography of Brazil
- List of cities in Brazil
