= List of municipalities in Mato Grosso =

This is a list of the municipalities in the state of Mato Grosso (MT), located in the Central-West Region of Brazil. Mato Grosso is divided into 142 municipalities, which are grouped into 22 microregions, which are grouped into 5 mesoregions.

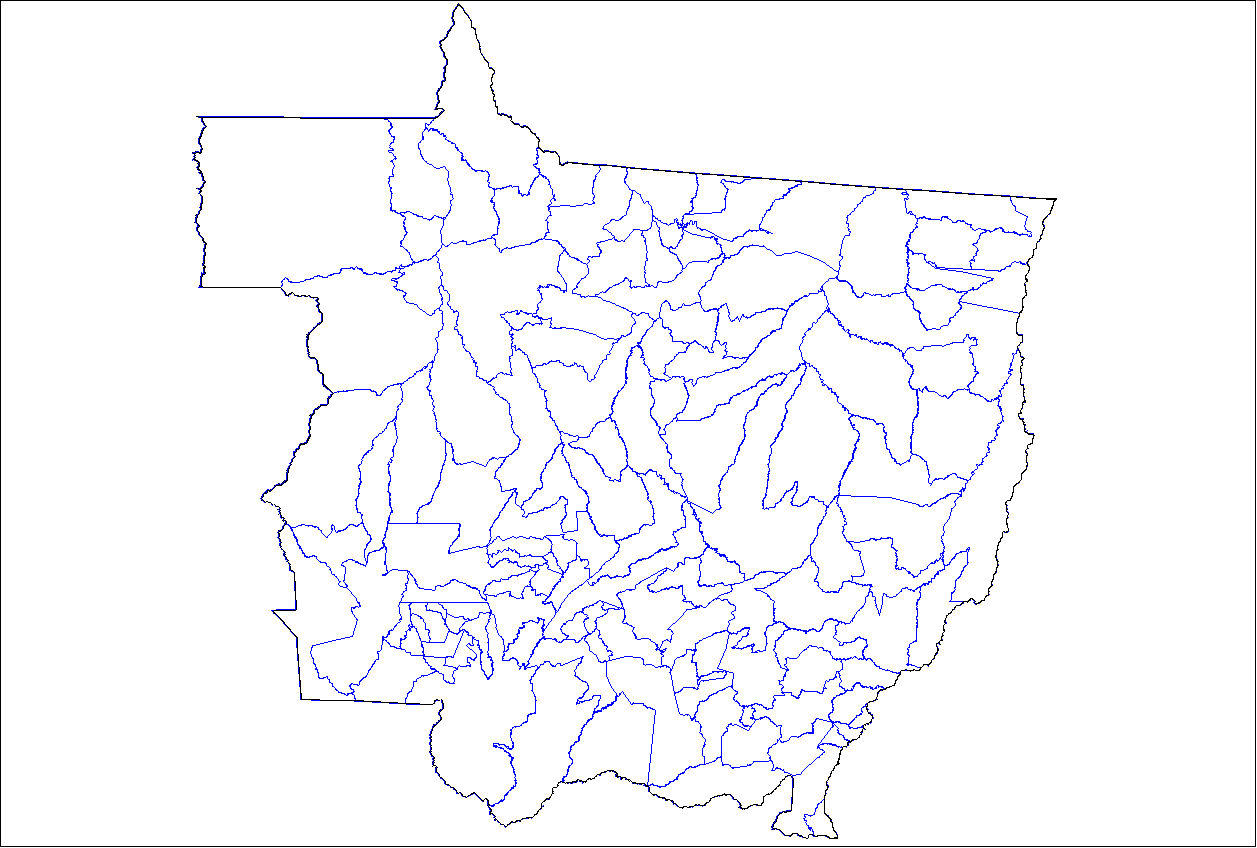
Municipalities of Mato Grosso, Brazil

Mesoregion	Microregion	Municipality	Population
Centro-Sul Mato-Grossense	Alto Pantanal	Barão de Melgaço	7,235
Centro-Sul Mato-Grossense	Alto Pantanal	Cáceres	89,681
Centro-Sul Mato-Grossense	Alto Pantanal	Curvelândia	4,903
Centro-Sul Mato-Grossense	Alto Pantanal	Poconé	31,217
Centro-Sul Mato-Grossense	Alto Paraguai	Alto Paraguai	8,009
Centro-Sul Mato-Grossense	Alto Paraguai	Arenápolis	10,576
Centro-Sul Mato-Grossense	Alto Paraguai	Nortelândia	5,956
Centro-Sul Mato-Grossense	Alto Paraguai	Nova Marilândia	3,529
Centro-Sul Mato-Grossense	Alto Paraguai	Santo Afonso	2,519
Centro-Sul Mato-Grossense	Cuiabá	Chapada dos Guimarães	18,990
Centro-Sul Mato-Grossense	Cuiabá	Cuiabá (State Capital)	650,877
Centro-Sul Mato-Grossense	Cuiabá	Nossa Senhora do Livramento	12,940
Centro-Sul Mato-Grossense	Cuiabá	Santo Antônio de Leverger	15,246
Centro-Sul Mato-Grossense	Cuiabá	Várzea Grande	300,078
Centro-Sul Mato-Grossense	Rosário Oeste	Acorizal	5,014
Centro-Sul Mato-Grossense	Rosário Oeste	Jangada	7,426
Centro-Sul Mato-Grossense	Rosário Oeste	Rosário Oeste	15,453
Nordeste Mato-Grossense	Canarana	Água Boa	12,589
Nordeste Mato-Grossense	Canarana	Campinápolis	15,347
Nordeste Mato-Grossense	Canarana	Canarana	25,858
Nordeste Mato-Grossense	Canarana	Nova Nazaré	4,200
Nordeste Mato-Grossense	Canarana	Nova Xavantina	24,345
Nordeste Mato-Grossense	Canarana	Novo São Joaquim	6,919
Nordeste Mato-Grossense	Canarana	Querência	26,769
Nordeste Mato-Grossense	Canarana	Santo Antônio do Leste	4,099
Nordeste Mato-Grossense	Médio Araguaia	Araguaiana	3,795
Nordeste Mato-Grossense	Médio Araguaia	Barra do Garças	69,210
Nordeste Mato-Grossense	Médio Araguaia	Cocalinho	6,220
Nordeste Mato-Grossense	Norte Araguaia	Alto Boa Vista	5,715
Nordeste Mato-Grossense	Norte Araguaia	Bom Jesus do Araguaia	7,280
Nordeste Mato-Grossense	Norte Araguaia	Canabrava do Norte	4,485
Nordeste Mato-Grossense	Norte Araguaia	Confresa	35,075
Nordeste Mato-Grossense	Norte Araguaia	Luciára	2,509
Nordeste Mato-Grossense	Norte Araguaia	Novo Santo Antônio	2,015
Nordeste Mato-Grossense	Norte Araguaia	Porto Alegre do Norte	12,127
Nordeste Mato-Grossense	Norte Araguaia	Ribeirão Cascalheira	10,089
Nordeste Mato-Grossense	Norte Araguaia	Santa Cruz do Xingu	2,661
Nordeste Mato-Grossense	Norte Araguaia	Santa Terezinha	7,596
Nordeste Mato-Grossense	Norte Araguaia	São Félix do Araguaia	13,621
Nordeste Mato-Grossense	Norte Araguaia	São José do Xingu	5,964
Nordeste Mato-Grossense	Norte Araguaia	Serra Nova Dourada	1,800
Nordeste Mato-Grossense	Norte Araguaia	Vila Rica	19,888
Norte Mato-Grossense	Alta Floresta	Alta Floresta	58,613
Norte Mato-Grossense	Alta Floresta	Apiacás	8,590
Norte Mato-Grossense	Alta Floresta	Carlinda	10,332
Norte Mato-Grossense	Alta Floresta	Nova Bandeirantes	13,635
Norte Mato-Grossense	Alta Floresta	Nova Monte Verde	8,313
Norte Mato-Grossense	Alta Floresta	Paranaíta	11,671
Norte Mato-Grossense	Alto Teles Pires	Boa Esperança do Norte	39,848
Norte Mato-Grossense	Alto Teles Pires	Ipiranga do Norte	7,815
Norte Mato-Grossense	Alto Teles Pires	Itanhangá	7,539
Norte Mato-Grossense	Alto Teles Pires	Lucas do Rio Verde	83,798
Norte Mato-Grossense	Alto Teles Pires	Nobres	15,492
Norte Mato-Grossense	Alto Teles Pires	Nova Mutum	55,839
Norte Mato-Grossense	Alto Teles Pires	Nova Ubiratã	11,530
Norte Mato-Grossense	Alto Teles Pires	Santa Rita do Trivelato	3,276
Norte Mato-Grossense	Alto Teles Pires	Sorriso	110,635
Norte Mato-Grossense	Alto Teles Pires	Tapurah	14,370
Norte Mato-Grossense	Arinos	Juara	34,906
Norte Mato-Grossense	Arinos	Nova Maringá	5,846
Norte Mato-Grossense	Arinos	Novo Horizonte do Norte	3,349
Norte Mato-Grossense	Arinos	Porto dos Gaúchos	5,593
Norte Mato-Grossense	Arinos	São José do Rio Claro	14,911
Norte Mato-Grossense	Arinos	Tabaporã	9,818
Norte Mato-Grossense	Aripuanã	Aripuanã	24,626
Norte Mato-Grossense	Aripuanã	Brasnorte	17,004
Norte Mato-Grossense	Aripuanã	Castanheira	7,506
Norte Mato-Grossense	Aripuanã	Colniza	25,766
Norte Mato-Grossense	Aripuanã	Cotriguaçu	11,011
Norte Mato-Grossense	Aripuanã	Juína	45,869
Norte Mato-Grossense	Aripuanã	Juruena	10,213
Norte Mato-Grossense	Aripuanã	Rondolândia	3,505
Norte Mato-Grossense	Colíder	Colíder	31,370
Norte Mato-Grossense	Colíder	Guarantã do Norte	31,024
Norte Mato-Grossense	Colíder	Matupá	20,091
Norte Mato-Grossense	Colíder	Nova Canaã do Norte	11,707
Norte Mato-Grossense	Colíder	Nova Guarita	4,590
Norte Mato-Grossense	Colíder	Novo Mundo	6,520
Norte Mato-Grossense	Colíder	Peixoto de Azevedo	32,714
Norte Mato-Grossense	Colíder	Terra Nova do Norte	10,616
Norte Mato-Grossense	Paranatinga	Gaúcha do Norte	8,642
Norte Mato-Grossense	Paranatinga	Nova Brasilândia	3,932
Norte Mato-Grossense	Paranatinga	Paranatinga	16,423
Norte Mato-Grossense	Paranatinga	Planalto da Serra	3,166
Norte Mato-Grossense	Parecis	Comodoro	18,238
Norte Mato-Grossense	Parecis	Campo Novo do Parecis	45,899
Norte Mato-Grossense	Parecis	Campos de Júlio	8,822
Norte Mato-Grossense	Parecis	Diamantino	21,941
Norte Mato-Grossense	Parecis	Sapezal	28,944
Norte Mato-Grossense	Sinop	Cláudia	9,593
Norte Mato-Grossense	Sinop	Feliz Natal	10,521
Norte Mato-Grossense	Sinop	Itaúba	5,020
Norte Mato-Grossense	Sinop	Marcelândia	11,396
Norte Mato-Grossense	Sinop	Nova Santa Helena	4,239
Norte Mato-Grossense	Sinop	Santa Carmem	5,374
Norte Mato-Grossense	Sinop	Sinop	196,312
Norte Mato-Grossense	Sinop	União do Sul	3,838
Norte Mato-Grossense	Sinop	Vera	12,800
Sudeste Mato-Grossense	Alto Araguaia	Alto Araguaia	17,193
Sudeste Mato-Grossense	Alto Araguaia	Alto Garças	13,052
Sudeste Mato-Grossense	Alto Araguaia	Alto Taquari	10,904
Sudeste Mato-Grossense	Primavera do Leste	Campo Verde	44,585
Sudeste Mato-Grossense	Primavera do Leste	Primavera do Leste	85,146
Sudeste Mato-Grossense	Rondonópolis	Dom Aquino	7,872
Sudeste Mato-Grossense	Rondonópolis	Itiquira	12,236
Sudeste Mato-Grossense	Rondonópolis	Jaciara	28,569
Sudeste Mato-Grossense	Rondonópolis	Juscimeira	11,480
Sudeste Mato-Grossense	Rondonópolis	Pedra Preta	18,066
Sudeste Mato-Grossense	Rondonópolis	Rondonópolis	244,911
Sudeste Mato-Grossense	Rondonópolis	São José do Povo	2,875
Sudeste Mato-Grossense	Rondonópolis	São Pedro da Cipa	4,191
Sudeste Mato-Grossense	Tesouro	Araguainha	1,010
Sudeste Mato-Grossense	Tesouro	General Carneiro	6,037
Sudeste Mato-Grossense	Tesouro	Guiratinga	10,966
Sudeste Mato-Grossense	Tesouro	Pontal do Araguaia	6,932
Sudeste Mato-Grossense	Tesouro	Ponte Branca	2,008
Sudeste Mato-Grossense	Tesouro	Poxoréo	23,283
Sudeste Mato-Grossense	Tesouro	Ribeirãozinho	2,593
Sudeste Mato-Grossense	Tesouro	Tesouro	3,025
Sudeste Mato-Grossense	Tesouro	Torixoréu	4,164
Sudoeste Mato-Grossense	Alto Guaporé	Conquista d'Oeste	3,760
Sudoeste Mato-Grossense	Alto Guaporé	Nova Lacerda	6,670
Sudoeste Mato-Grossense	Alto Guaporé	Pontes e Lacerda	52,018
Sudoeste Mato-Grossense	Alto Guaporé	Vale de São Domingos	2,904
Sudoeste Mato-Grossense	Alto Guaporé	Vila Bela da Santíssima Trindade	16,774
Sudoeste Mato-Grossense	Jauru	Araputanga	14,786
Sudoeste Mato-Grossense	Jauru	Figueirópolis d'Oeste	3,187
Sudoeste Mato-Grossense	Jauru	Glória d'Oeste	2,905
Sudoeste Mato-Grossense	Jauru	Indiavaí	2,213
Sudoeste Mato-Grossense	Jauru	Jauru	8,367
Sudoeste Mato-Grossense	Jauru	Lambari d'Oeste	4,790
Sudoeste Mato-Grossense	Jauru	Mirassol d'Oeste	26,785
Sudoeste Mato-Grossense	Jauru	Porto Esperidião	10,204
Sudoeste Mato-Grossense	Jauru	Reserva do Cabaçal	2,122
Sudoeste Mato-Grossense	Jauru	Rio Branco	4,535
Sudoeste Mato-Grossense	Jauru	Salto do Céu	3,679
Sudoeste Mato-Grossense	Jauru	São José dos Quatro Marcos	17,849
Sudoeste Mato-Grossense	Tangará da Serra	Barra do Bugres	29,403
Sudoeste Mato-Grossense	Tangará da Serra	Denise	7,014
Sudoeste Mato-Grossense	Tangará da Serra	Nova Olímpia	16,352
Sudoeste Mato-Grossense	Tangará da Serra	Porto Estrela	3,224
Sudoeste Mato-Grossense	Tangará da Serra	Tangará da Serra	106,434

== See also ==
- Geography of Brazil
- List of cities in Brazil
