= Nova Mutum =

- Municipality
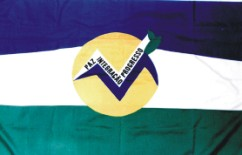
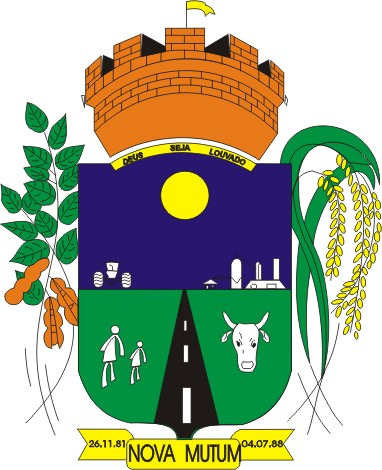
- Flag Coat of arms
- Nickname: Mutum

- Location in Brazil
- Coordinates: 13°49′19″S 56°04′58″W
- Country: Brazil
- Region: Center-West
- State: Mato Grosso
- Mesoregion: Norte Mato-Grossense
- Founded: 1981

Government
  - Mayor: Adriano Pivetta

Population (2020)
  - Total: 46,813
- Time zone: UTC−3 (BRT)

Nova Mutum is a municipality in the state of Mato Grosso in the Central-West Region of Brazil. Located 242 kilometers (150 miles) north of Cuiabá, the state capital, it belongs to the Alto Teles Pires microregion and Norte Mato-Grossense mesoregion. In 2022, the Brazilian Institute of Geography and Statistics estimated its population to be 55,832 people.

The city has the 3rd best Human Development Index (HDI) of the state, and the 8th largest economy of the state, with a GDP of R$2167526.000000, 332nd of Brazil. Much of its economy is focused on agriculture; the municipality is the second-largest state grain producer and one of the largest in Brazil, with an area of 410,000 hectares (1,000,000 acres) of planted soybeans, the 3rd-largest exporter in Mato Grosso and 53rd of Brazil.

== Population ==
Historical population
| Year | Pop. | ±% |
|---|---|---|
| 1981 | 100 | — |
| 1991 | 5,542 | +5442.0% |
| 1996 | 7,000 | +26.3% |
| 2000 | 14,818 | +111.7% |
| 2010 | 31,649 | +113.6% |
| 2016 | 41,178 | +30.1% |

The population of Nova Mutum increased by 113.47% over a period of 10 years, and was the city that had the highest population increase of Mato Grosso (in the period 2000–2010). The information is based on the results of the 2010 Demographic Census, conducted by the Brazilian Institute of Geography and Statistics (IBGE). In 2010, there were 31,649 inhabitants, and in 2000, the municipality had 14,818 inhabitants. According to estimates from the Brazilian Institute of Geography and Statistics (IBGE), Nova Mutum had a population of 41,178 in 2016, a figure considered controversial due to an annual increase of more than 11.36%. By 2022, the national census estimated the municipality’s population at 55,839. Currently, Nova Mutum must have a population of approximately 60,000.

The population boom in Nova Mutum occurred when the municipality succeeded in aligning agricultural production with industrialization, which encouraged the establishment of hundreds of companies. The local economy is primarily driven by the cultivation of soy, corn, and cotton.

Currently, the city has the third-highest Human Development Index (HDI) in the state and the second-highest among inland municipalities. Nova Mutum reached an overall HDI of 0.758. In the subcategories, the municipality recorded an income HDI of 0.773, a longevity HDI of 0.837, and an education HDI of 0.673.

== Geography ==
Geographical boundaries:

- North: Nova Maringá, Tapurah and Lucas do Rio Verde;
- East: Sorriso and Santa Rita do Trivelato;
- South: Rosário Oeste, Nobres and Diamantino;
- West: São José do Rio Claro and Diamantino.

Distances: To the state capital (Cuiabá): 242 km (150 mi). By the port of Santos: 2,107 km (1,309 mi). By the port of Paranaguá: 2,180 km (1,350 mi) to Santarém / PA: 1,530 km by BR163, to Alto Taquari / MT – railroad station (Ferronorte): 750 km (470 mi)

Predominant Climate: Equatorial – Hot Tropical and sub-humid, with two well-defined seasons: Drought May–September; Rains: October–April
Annual average temperature: 24 °C (75 °F) – with an average maximum of 34 °C, and average minimum of 4 °C (39 °F).

Altitudes: municipal office: 450 metres (1,480 ft); Production area: 480 to 550 meters (1,570 to 1,800 ft).

Annual rainfall: The average annual rainfall is 2,200 mm (87 in), ranging from 1,850 to 2,400 mm (73 to 94 in), and the relative humidity is 80% in the rainy season and 35% in the dry season.

Typography: The relief of Nova Mutum is characterized by being flat, with slope not greater than 3% and constitutes part of the Chapada dos Parecis.

Training Geological: Archaeology unfolded the Phanerozoic. Quaternary Basin of the Xingu and Mesozoic Basin of the Parecis.

Soil: The soil is predominantly latosol (80%) and quartz sand (20%).

Vegetation: The vegetation of the municipality is constituted by 70% and 30% of cerrado forest.

Water Resources: The municipality of Nova Mutum is located in the Amazon Basin. The main rivers are: Rio Verde, Rio Arinos, Rio Ranchão, Rio Novo, Rio Beija-Flor, Rio dos Patos, Rio Moderno and Rio Piuvão.

Territory of the municipality: 9,572.69 km^{2} (3,696.04 sq mi), equivalent to 1.12% of the total area of the state of Mato Grosso.

== Climate ==
Nova Mutum has a typical Mato Grosso tropical savanna climate (Köppen Aw). It has two seasons: a wet season from October to April and a dry season from May to September, whilst afternoon temperatures are consistently very warm to hot, and morning temperatures mild to warm. Especially during the wet season, high humidity can make it feel much hotter than suggested by the air temperature.

Climate data for Nova Mutum
| Month | Jan | Feb | Mar | Apr | May | Jun | Jul | Aug | Sep | Oct | Nov | Dec | Year |
|---|---|---|---|---|---|---|---|---|---|---|---|---|---|
| Record high °C (°F) | 37.0 (98.6) | 38.0 (100.4) | 36.0 (96.8) | 36.0 (96.8) | 34.0 (93.2) | 34.0 (93.2) | 36.0 (96.8) | 40.0 (104.0) | 44.0 (111.2) | 41.0 (105.8) | 41.0 (105.8) | 37.0 (98.6) | 44.0 (111.2) |
| Mean daily maximum °C (°F) | 27.0 (80.6) | 27.0 (80.6) | 27.0 (80.6) | 27.0 (80.6) | 27.0 (80.6) | 27.0 (80.6) | 28.0 (82.4) | 31.0 (87.8) | 32.0 (89.6) | 31.0 (87.8) | 29.0 (84.2) | 27.0 (80.6) | 32.0 (89.6) |
| Daily mean °C (°F) | 23.5 (74.3) | 23.5 (74.3) | 23.5 (74.3) | 23.5 (74.3) | 22.5 (72.5) | 22.0 (71.6) | 22.0 (71.6) | 24.5 (76.1) | 26.5 (79.7) | 26.0 (78.8) | 25.0 (77.0) | 24.0 (75.2) | 23.8 (74.8) |
| Mean daily minimum °C (°F) | 20.0 (68.0) | 20.0 (68.0) | 20.0 (68.0) | 20.0 (68.0) | 18.0 (64.4) | 17.0 (62.6) | 16.0 (60.8) | 18.0 (64.4) | 21.0 (69.8) | 21.0 (69.8) | 21.0 (69.8) | 21.0 (69.8) | 16.0 (60.8) |
| Record low °C (°F) | 16.0 (60.8) | 15.0 (59.0) | 10.0 (50.0) | 10.0 (50.0) | 7.0 (44.6) | 4.0 (39.2) | 5.0 (41.0) | 3.0 (37.4) | 10.0 (50.0) | 16.0 (60.8) | 14.0 (57.2) | 11.0 (51.8) | 3.0 (37.4) |
| Average rainfall mm (inches) | 257.0 (10.12) | 240.0 (9.45) | 279.0 (10.98) | 159.0 (6.26) | 53.0 (2.09) | 24.0 (0.94) | 9.0 (0.35) | 16.0 (0.63) | 69.0 (2.72) | 167.0 (6.57) | 240.0 (9.45) | 257.0 (10.12) | 1,770 (69.68) |
Source: Foreca/MSN

== See also ==
- List of municipalities in Mato Grosso
