= Quilombo Capão do Negro Cristo Rei =

The Quilombo Capão do Negro Cristo Rei is located in the city of Várzea Grande in Mato Grosso.

== History ==
The city of Várzea Grande is bordered by the municipalities of Cuiabá, Santo Antônio de Leverger, Nossa Senhora do Livramento and Acorizal. The Cristo Rei neighborhood is located in the eastern region of Várzea Grande. The current Cohab-MT was formerly called Colônia da União or Capão do Negro. In 1948, the municipality of Várzea Grande was emancipated, and the then mayor Júlio Domingos de Campos donated 700 hectares (1,700 acres) of land belonging to Capão do Negro to Infraero for the construction of the Várzea Grande airport. The black people belonging to that place were removed and transferred to the Cristo Rei region in a subdivision called "Roção".

In 1958, the municipality of Várzea Grande donated approximately 200 hectares (490 acres) of Capão do Negro for the construction of the Cristo Rei Seminary. The expropriations for the construction work left many residents of the Capão do Negro area disadvantaged. The residents were relocated to other areas of the city, thus being removed from the places where they lived.

The Afro-descendants of the Capão do Negro community made their living from agriculture, hunting, and fishing. Cultivated foods included corn, cassava, sugarcane, bananas, and medicinal herbs. Other jobs performed until the first decades of the 20th century were carpentry, fishing, greengrocer, milkman, and portering, while women worked as cooks and laundresses in the homes of wealthier families.

With the intensification of the city's modernization in the second half of the 20th century, customs also underwent changes. The Cristo Rei neighborhood is a vestige of the former Quilombo do Capão do Negro, which disappeared with the advancement of the city's construction. The areas that were part of the Quilombo are the Cristo Rei Seminary, the Várzea Grande University Center, the Cuiabá International Airport, and the Várzea Grande Shopping Mall.

== Listing ==
As established by the Federal Constitution of 1988, the remaining Quilombo sites are listed as Brazilian cultural heritage. On August 3, 2009, the Quilombo Capão do Negro Cristo Rei was recognized by the Palmares Foundation as a Quilombo.
