= Boa Esperança do Norte =

- Municipality
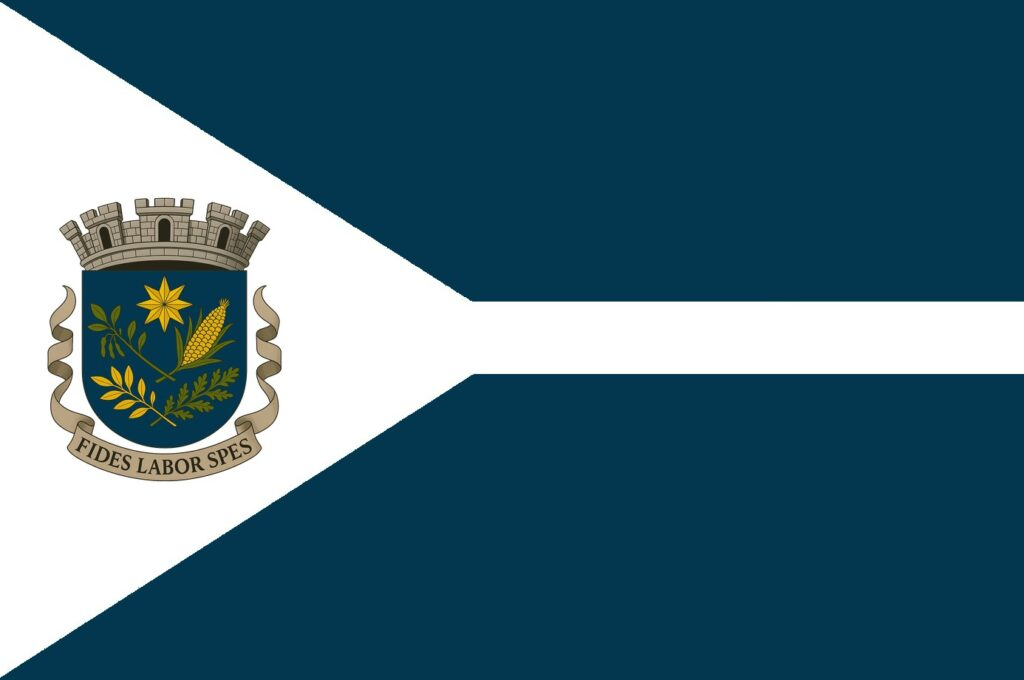
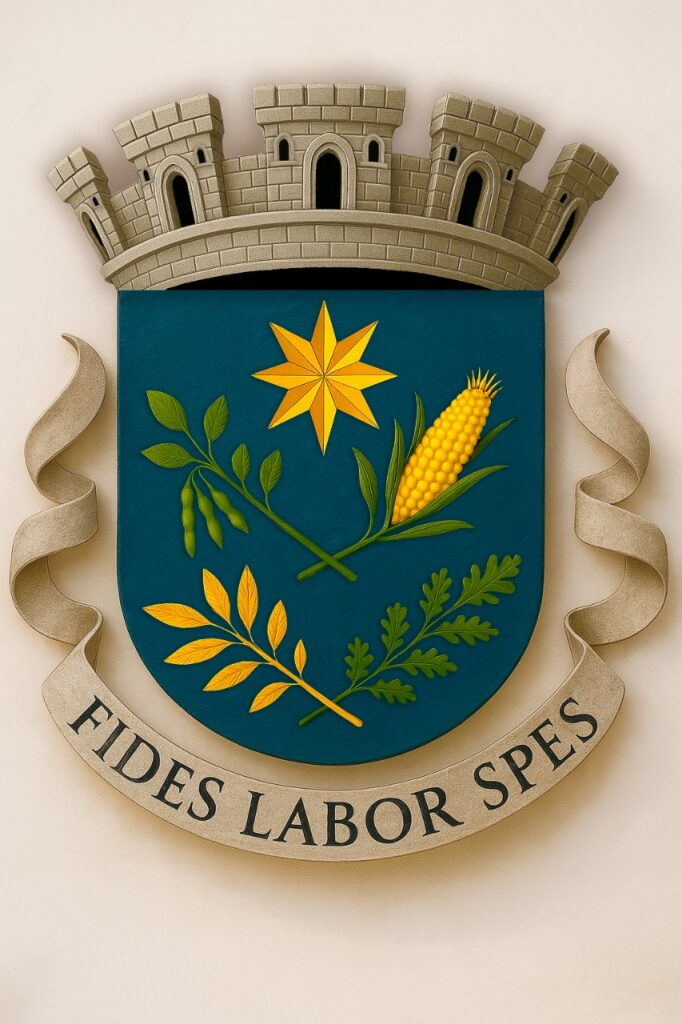
- Flag Coat of arms

- Country: Brazil
- Region: Center-West
- State: Mato Grosso

Population (2023)
  - Total: 7,000
- Time zone: UTC−4 (BRT-1)

Boa Esperança do Norte is a municipality in the state of Mato Grosso in the Central-West Region of Brazil, the creation of the municipality was approved in March of 2000, however it was only recognized by the Supreme Federal Court in October 2023. It was established on 1 January 2025.

Prior to its municipal status, Boa Esperança was a district of Sorriso, however 80% of the land of the new municipality previously belonged to Nova Ubiratã.

== See also ==
- List of municipalities in Mato Grosso
