= Nova Canaã do Norte =

Coordinates: 10.5578°S 55.9528°W

- Municipality
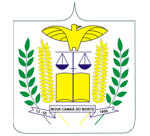
- Coat of arms

- Country: Brazil
- Region: Center-West
- State: Mato Grosso
- Mesoregion: Norte Mato-Grossense

Population (2020)
  - Total: 12,831
- Time zone: UTC−3 (BRT)

Nova Canaã do Norte is a municipality in the state of Mato Grosso in the Central-West Region of Brazil.

== See also ==
- List of municipalities in Mato Grosso
