= Vale de São Domingos =

Coordinates: 15.2939°S 59.0608°W

- Municipality
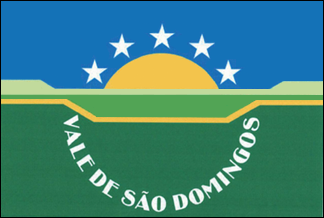
- Flag

- Country: Brazil
- Region: Center-West
- State: Mato Grosso
- Mesoregion: Sudoeste Mato-Grossense
- Microregion: Alto Guaporé
- Founded: December 28, 1999

Government
  - Mayor: Geraldo Martins da Silva

Area
  - Total: 728.83 sq mi (1,887.67 km^{2})

Population (2020)
  - Total: 3,126
- Demonym: Vale-dominguenses
- Time zone: UTC−3 (BRT)

Vale de São Domingos is a municipality in the state of Mato Grosso in the Central-West Region of Brazil.

== See also ==
- List of municipalities in Mato Grosso
