= São José do Povo =

Coordinates: 16.465°S 54.255°W

- Municipality
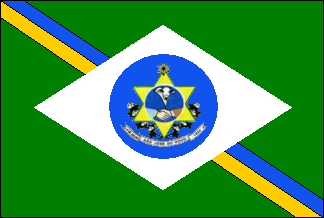
- Flag

- Country: Brazil
- Region: Center-West
- State: Mato Grosso
- Mesoregion: Sudeste Mato-Grossense

Population (2020)
  - Total: 4,450
- Time zone: UTC−4 (BRT)

São José do Povo is a municipality in the state of Mato Grosso in the Central-West Region of Brazil.

== See also ==
- List of municipalities in Mato Grosso
