= Santa Carmem =

Coordinates: 11.9128°S 55.2258°W

- Municipality
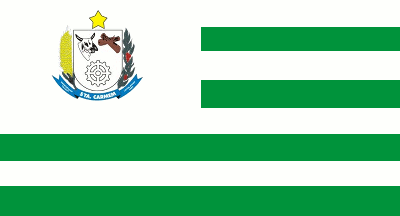
- Flag

- Country: Brazil
- Region: Center-West
- State: Mato Grosso
- Mesoregion: Norte Mato-Grossense

Population (2020)
  - Total: 4,563
- Time zone: UTC−3 (BRT)

Santa Carmem is a municipality in the state of Mato Grosso in the Central-West Region of Brazil.

== See also ==
- List of municipalities in Mato Grosso
