= Nortelândia =

Coordinates: 14.455°S 56.8028°W

- Municipality
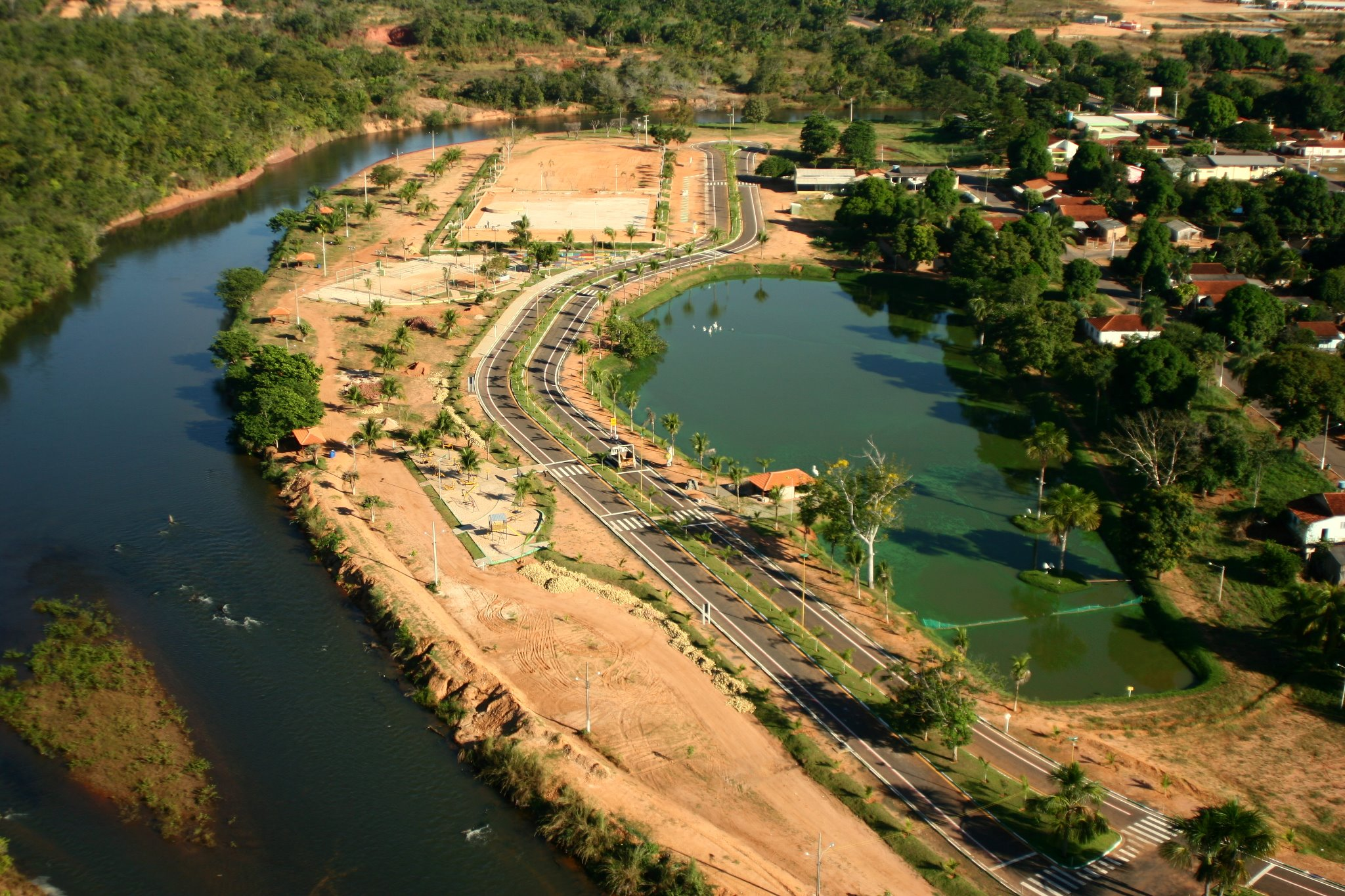

- Country: Brazil
- Region: Center-West
- State: Mato Grosso
- Mesoregion: Centro-Sul Mato-Grossense

Population (2020)
  - Total: 5,923
- Time zone: UTC−3 (BRT)

Nortelândia is a municipality in the state of Mato Grosso in the Central-West Region of Brazil.

== History ==
The origin of Nortelândia comes from mining, and mining activities in the region trace back to the early days of Diamantino.

In 1815, the São Joaquim mine was opened in the vicinity of what is now the center of Nortelândia. Mining activity declined, being replaced by rubber extraction, which also went into decline. Around 1937, the formation of the municipality began effectively. The first name of the place was Santana dos Garimpeiros, due to the patron saint and the Santana River, which flows through the city. The former Santana dos Garimpeiros attracted many people to its mines, especially from the north and northeast of Brazil, hence the name of the city, in honor of the Northeasterners and Northerners who decisively contributed to the land they chose to live in.

In a unique case in the history of Mato Grosso, the municipality was created twice, the first time on December 11, 1953, under the name of Santana dos Garimpeiros, and the second time on December 16 of the same year, under the name of Nortelândia, with completely different laws, without the second making any mention of the first. The second denomination was consolidated: Nortelândia.

== See also ==
- List of municipalities in Mato Grosso
