= Nova Guarita =

Coordinates: 10.3158°S 55.41°W

- Municipality
- Country: Brazil
- Region: Center-West
- State: Mato Grosso
- Mesoregion: Norte Mato-Grossense

Population (2020)
  - Total: 4,464
- Time zone: UTC−3 (BRT)

Nova Guarita is a municipality in the state of Mato Grosso in the Central-West Region of Brazil.

== See also ==
- List of municipalities in Mato Grosso
