= Nova Marilândia =

Coordinates: 14.3639°S 56.9689°W

- Municipality
- Country: Brazil
- Region: Center-West
- State: Mato Grosso
- Mesoregion: Centro-Sul Mato-Grossense

Population (2020)
  - Total: 3,304
- Time zone: UTC−3 (BRT)

Nova Marilândia is a municipality in the state of Mato Grosso in the Central-West Region of Brazil. It is also the closest inhabitance to South America's Pole of inaccessibility.

== See also ==
- List of municipalities in Mato Grosso
