= Planalto da Serra =

Coordinates: 14.6578°S 54.7739°W

- Municipality
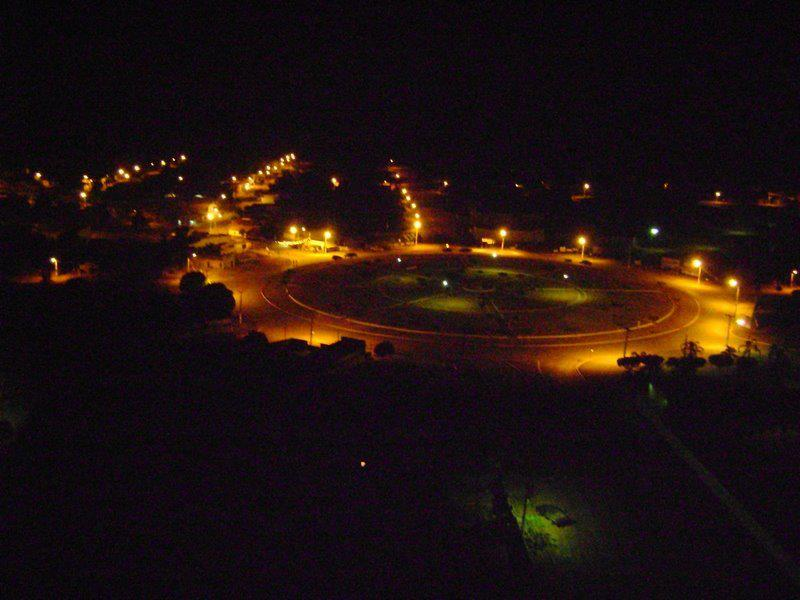

- Country: Brazil
- Region: Center-West
- State: Mato Grosso
- Mesoregion: Norte Mato-Grossense

Population (2020)
  - Total: 2,649
- Time zone: UTC−3 (BRT)

Planalto da Serra is a municipality in the state of Mato Grosso in the Central-West Region of Brazil.

== See also ==
- List of municipalities in Mato Grosso
