= Itanhangá =

Coordinates: 12°14′07″S 56°38′44″W

- Municipality
- Interactive map of Itanhangá
- Country: Brazil
- Region: Center-West
- State: Mato Grosso
- Mesoregion: Norte Mato-Grossense

Area
  - Total: 1,123.459 sq mi (2,909.745 km^{2})

Population (2022)
  - Total: 7,539
  - Density: 6.711/sq mi (2.591/km^{2})
- Time zone: UTC−4 (BRT)

Itanhangá is a municipality in the state of Mato Grosso in the Central-West Region of Brazil.

== See also ==
- List of municipalities in Mato Grosso
