= Reserva do Cabaçal =

Coordinates: 15.08°S 58.4658°W

- Municipality
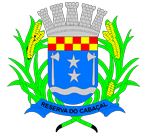
- Flag Coat of arms

- Country: Brazil
- Region: Southeast
- State: Mato Grosso
- Mesoregion: Sudoeste Mato-Grossense

Population (2020)
  - Total: 2,743
- Time zone: UTC−3 (BRT)

Reserva do Cabaçal is a municipality in the state of Mato Grosso in the Central-West Region of Brazil.

== See also ==
- List of municipalities in Mato Grosso
