= Indiavaí =

Coordinates: 15.4939°S 58.5728°W

- Municipality
- Country: Brazil
- Region: Center-West
- State: Mato Grosso
- Mesoregion: Sudoeste Mato-Grossense

Population (2020)
  - Total: 2,779
- Time zone: UTC−3 (BRT)

Indiavaí is a municipality in the state of Mato Grosso in the Central-West Region of Brazil.

== See also ==
- List of municipalities in Mato Grosso
