= Salto do Céu =

Coordinates: 15.13°S 58.1269°W

- Municipality
- Country: Brazil
- Region: Southeast
- State: Mato Grosso
- Mesoregion: Sudoeste Mato-Grossense

Population (2020)
  - Total: 3,295
- Time zone: UTC−3 (BRT)

Salto do Céu is a municipality in the state of Mato Grosso in the Central-West Region of Brazil.

== See also ==
- List of municipalities in Mato Grosso
