= Xingu State Park =

State park in Brazil

- Parque Estadual do Xingu
- IUCN category II (national park)
- Location within Brazil
- Nearest city: Santa Cruz do Xingu
- Coordinates: 9.819°S 52.594°W
- Area: 96,288 hectares (237,930 acres)
- Designation: State park
- Created: 7 December 2001

Xingu State Park (Portuguese: Parque Estadual do Xingu) is a state park in the state of Mato Grosso, Brazil.

== Location ==
Xingu State Park is in the municipality of Santa Cruz do Xingu and has an area of 96,288 hectares (237,930 acres). The park is in the Xingu River basin. It includes a section of the Xingu River that was outside the Xingu Indigenous Park. The park is important in helping protect the 2,600,000 hectares (6,400,000 acres) Xingu Indigenous Park, inhabited by fourteen ethnic groups, which is now surrounded by agricultural developments.

The park is to the south of the Menkragnoti Indigenous Territory, which is on the other side of the Xingu River. It adjoins the Capoto/Jarina Indigenous Territory to the west. Its boundary to the north is the border with the state of Pará. To the east the Fontourinha stream defines its boundary. The park is in the Amazon biome. 81.87% of the park is covered by savanna/pioneer contact, and 18% by savanna/rainforest contact.

== Conservation ==
Xingu State Park was created by decree 3.585 of 7 December 2001 with an area of about 134,463 hectares (332,270 acres). It was redefined by law 8054 of 29 December 2003, signed by the state governor Blairo Maggi, which reduced its size to 95,024 hectares (234,810 acres). The reduction was justified on the basis of a referendum of the people of Santa Cruz do Xingu by technicians from the State Environmental Foundation (FEMA). The agricultural frontier was limited by the amount of protected land, some of which had to be released for expansion of food production.

The consultative council was established on 28 September 2007. The objectives are to protect and conserve the various ecosystems and to prevent human actions that would jeopardise the future of the many indigenous groups found in the park. The conservation unit is supported by the Amazon Region Protected Areas Program.

== Sources ==
- Full list: PAs supported by ARPA, ARPA
- "Governo quer reduzir Parque Estadual do Xingu", Diário de Cuiabá (in Portuguese), 16 December 2003, archived from the original on 18 August 2016
- Parque Estadual do Xingu (in Portuguese), Via Rural, archived from the original on 17 June 2016
- PES do Xingu (in Portuguese), ISA: Instituto Socioambiental
