= Ipiranga do Norte =

Coordinates: 15.5872°S 56.0975°W

- Municipality
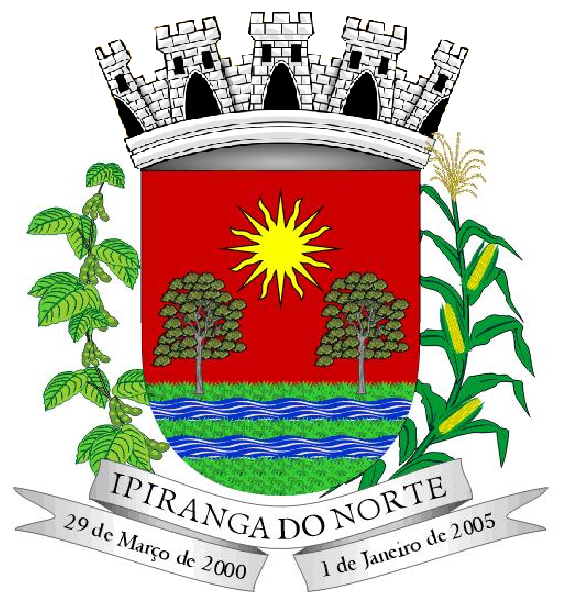
- Coat of arms
- Interactive map of Ipiranga do Norte
- Country: Brazil
- Region: Center-West
- State: Mato Grosso
- Mesoregion: Norte Mato-Grossense

Population (2020)
  - Total: 7,920
- Time zone: UTC−3 (BRT)

Ipiranga do Norte is a municipality in the state of Mato Grosso in the Central-West Region of Brazil.

== See also ==
- List of municipalities in Mato Grosso
