= São Pedro da Cipa =

The Municipality of São Pedro da Cipa
- Municipality
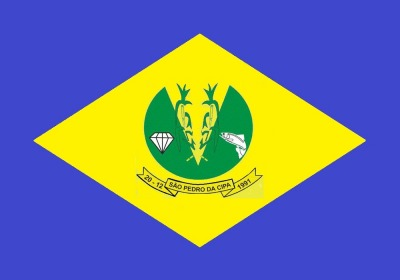
- Flag

- Location of São Pedro da Cipa state
- Coordinates: 16°00′03″S 54°55′15″W
- Country: Brazil
- Region: Central-West
- State: Mato Grosso

Government
  - Mayor: Wilson Virginio de Lima (PR)

Area
  - Total: 344.36 km^{2} (132.96 sq mi)
- Elevation: 343 m (1,125 ft)

Population (2020)
  - Total: 4,771
  - Density: 13.85/km^{2} (35.88/sq mi)
- Time zone: UTC−4 (AMT)
- HDI (2000): 0.717 – medium

São Pedro da Cipa is a municipality in the state of Mato Grosso in the Central-West Region of Brazil.

== See also ==
- List of municipalities in Mato Grosso
