= Tesouro =

Coordinates: 16°04′S 53°34′W

- Municipality
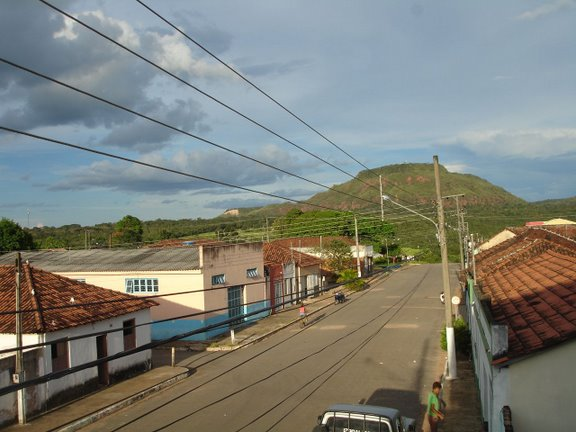

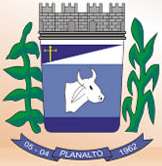
- Coat of arms

- Country: Brazil
- Region: Center-West
- State: Mato Grosso
- Mesoregion: Sudeste Mato-Grossense

Population (2020)
  - Total: 3,824
- Time zone: UTC−3 (BRT)
- Website: tesouro.mt.gov.br

Tesouro is a municipality in the state of Mato Grosso in the Central-West Region of Brazil.

== Climate ==
Tesouro is classified as tropical savanna climate according to the Köppen climate classification (Köppen: Aw).

== See also ==
- List of municipalities in Mato Grosso
