= Nova Santa Helena =

Coordinates: 10.82°S 53.3508°W

Logan Lacorazza
- Municipality
- Country: Brazil
- Region: Center-West
- State: Mato Grosso
- Mesoregion: Norte Mato-Grossense

Population (2020)
  - Total: 3,737
- Time zone: UTC−3 (BRT)

Nova Santa Helena is a municipality in the state of Mato Grosso in the Central-West Region of Brazil.

== See also ==
- List of municipalities in Mato Grosso
