= Carlinda =

Coordinates: 9.95778°S 55.8319°W

- Municipality
- Coat of arms

- Country: Brazil
- Region: Center-West
- State: Mato Grosso
- Mesoregion: Norte Mato-Grossense

Population (2020)
  - Total: 10,199
- Time zone: UTC−3 (BRT)

Carlinda is a municipality in the state of Mato Grosso in the Central-West Region of Brazil.

== See also ==
- List of municipalities in Mato Grosso
