= Nova Lacerda =

Coordinates: 14.4758°S 59.6089°W

- Municipality
- Country: Brazil
- Region: Center-West
- State: Mato Grosso
- Mesoregion: Sudoeste Mato-Grossense

Population (2020)
  - Total: 6,751
- Time zone: UTC−3 (BRT)

Nova Lacerda is a municipality in the state of Mato Grosso in the Central-West Region of Brazil.

== History ==
Nova Lacerda was created by splitting the territories of the municipalities of Comodoro and Vila Bela da Santíssima Trindade by State Law No. 6,722 of December 26, 1995, with the municipality being established in 1997.

== Climate ==
The climate is tropical-subtropical with two distinct seasons: a dry season that extends roughly from May to September, and a rainy season from October to April. During the dry season, the skies are clearer and humidity is lower, while during the rainy season, temperatures and humidity rise, and the likelihood of rainfall increases. Annual temperatures are moderate to high, with little variation across the seasons due to its tropical location and relatively low altitude.

== See also ==
- List of municipalities in Mato Grosso
