= Arenápolis =

Coordinates: 14°26′S 56°49′W

- Municipality
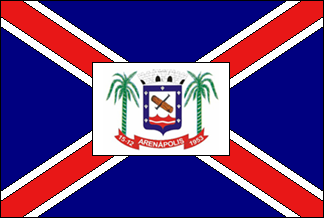
- Flag

- Country: Brazil
- Region: Center-West
- State: Mato Grosso
- Mesoregion: Centro-Sul Mato-Grossense

Area
  - Total: 415 km^{2} (160 sq mi)

Population (2020)
  - Total: 9,502
  - Density: 23.78/km^{2} (61.6/sq mi)
- Time zone: UTC−4 (AMT)

Arenápolis is a Brazilian municipality in the state of Mato Grosso. It is situated at a latitude of 14°27'01" south and a longitude of 56°50'46" west, at an altitude of 247 meters, making it the closest city to the South American continental pole of inaccessibility. The estimated population in 2021 was 9,399 inhabitants, covering an area of 417.337 km^{2} (161.135 sq mi).

The municipality originated from diamond mining in abundant gravel, leading hundreds of people since the 18th century to settle along the banks of the Ribeirão Areias river, populating what was initially known as the village of Areias. This village later gained independence and was renamed Arenápolis for a more resonant name while still referencing its origins related to the Ribeirão Areias river.

== History ==
=== Diamond Mining ===
The mining activity in the Ribeirão Areias area, which inspired the municipality's name, is as ancient as the historical development of Diamantino, dating back to the 18th century.

The actual formation of the city began in 1936 when miners explored the right bank of the Santana River, below its confluence with Ribeirão Areias, discovering formations favorable for diamond mining. Around 1940, the first diamonds were panned along the banks of Areias River. This discovery attracted more miners to the area.

== See also ==
- List of municipalities in Mato Grosso
