= Conquista d'Oeste =

Coordinates: 14.5578°S 59.5719°W

- Municipality
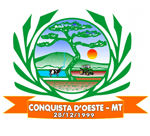
- Flag Coat of arms

- Country: Brazil
- Region: Center-West
- State: Mato Grosso
- Mesoregion: Sudoeste Mato-Grossense

Population (2021)
  - Total: 4,163
- Time zone: UTC−3 (BRT)

Conquista d'Oeste is a municipality in the state of Mato Grosso in the Central-West Region of Brazil.

== See also ==
- List of municipalities in Mato Grosso
