= Glória d'Oeste =

Coordinates: 15.7678°S 58.3558°W

- Municipality
- Country: Brazil
- Region: Center-West
- State: Mato Grosso
- Mesoregion: Sudoeste Mato-Grossense

Population (2020)
  - Total: 3,008
- Time zone: UTC−3 (BRT)

Glória d'Oeste is a municipality in the state of Mato Grosso in the Central-West Region of Brazil.

== See also ==
- List of municipalities in Mato Grosso
