= Figueirópolis d'Oeste =

Coordinates: 15.445°S 58.74°W

- Municipality
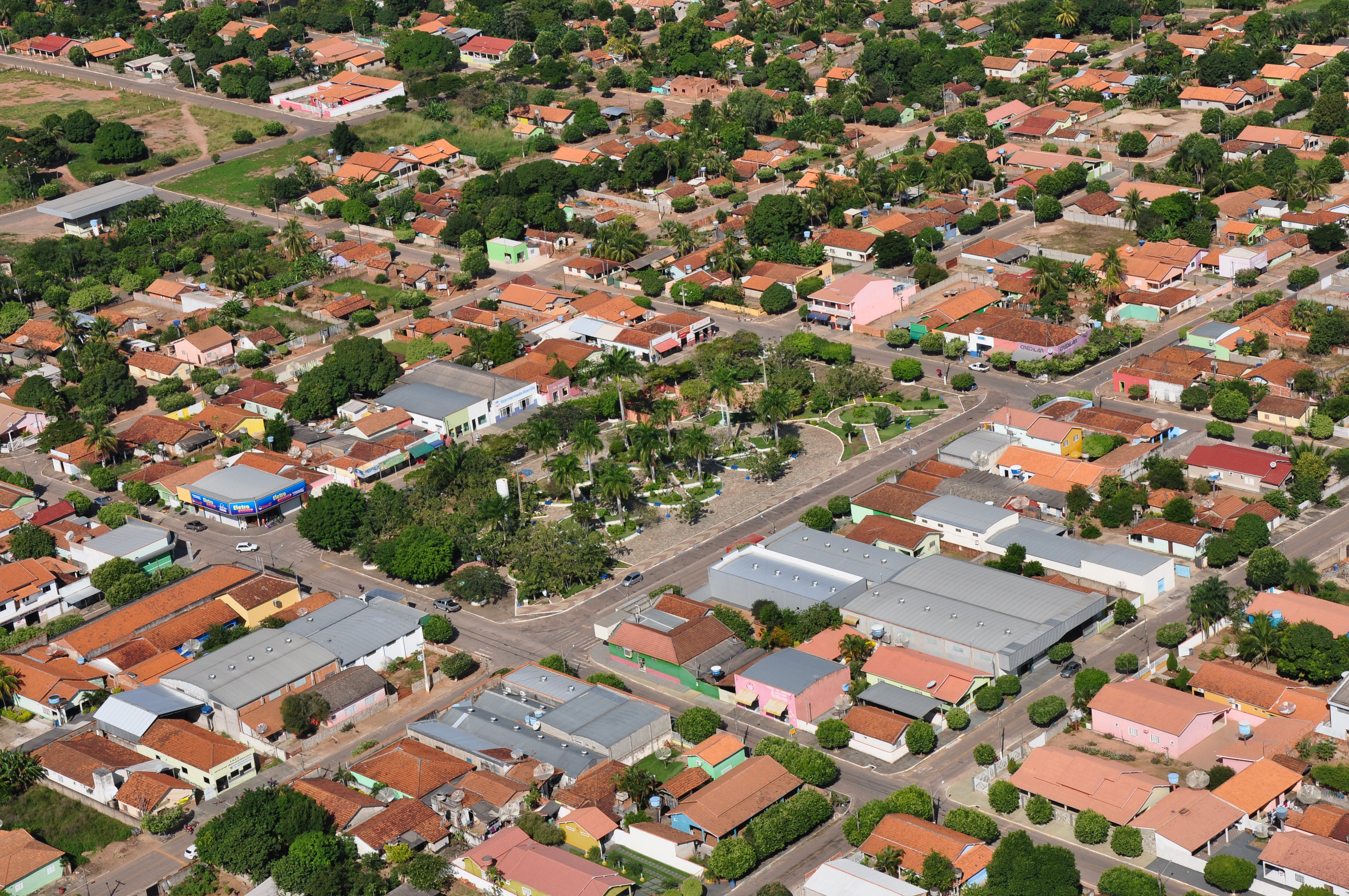

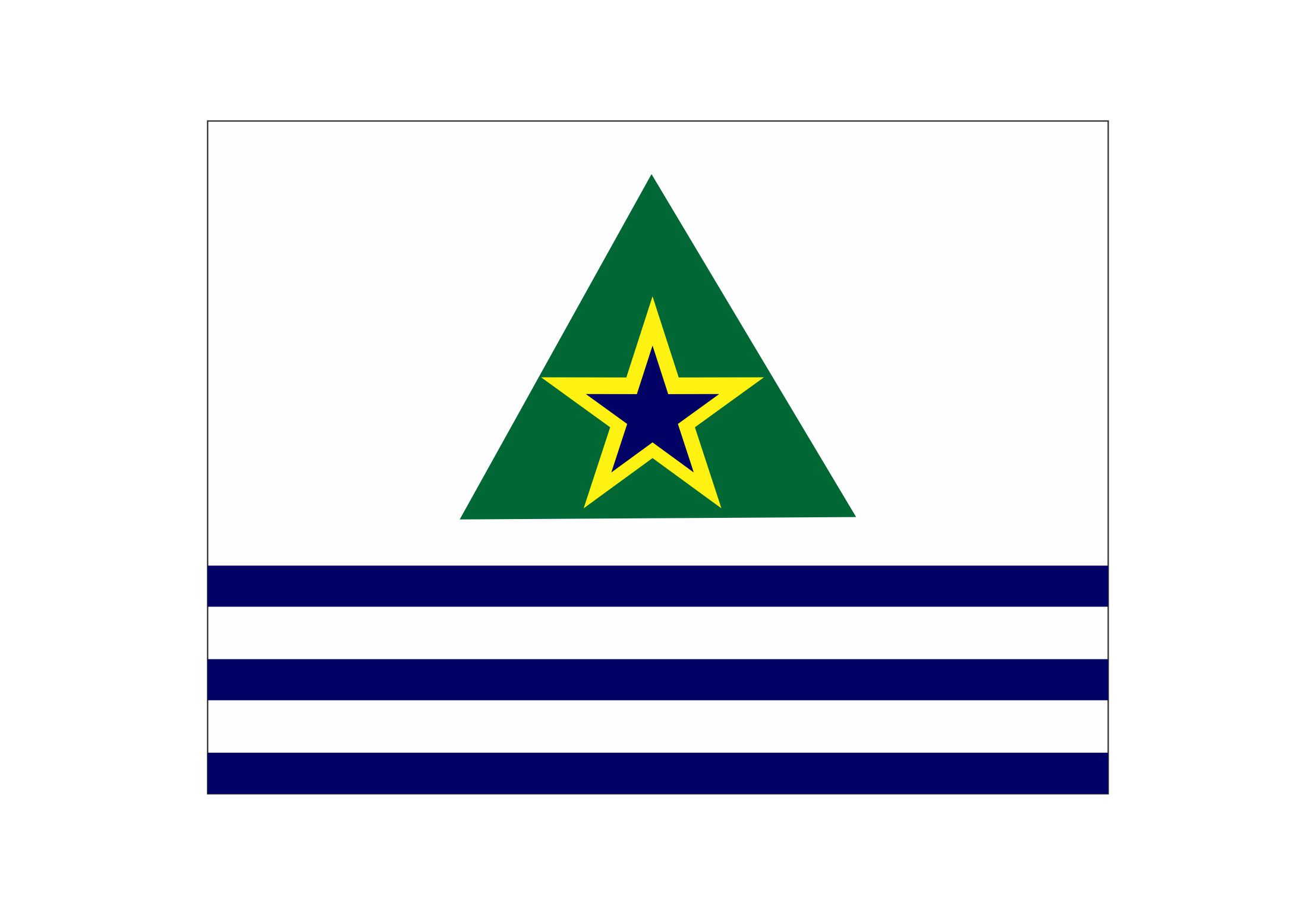
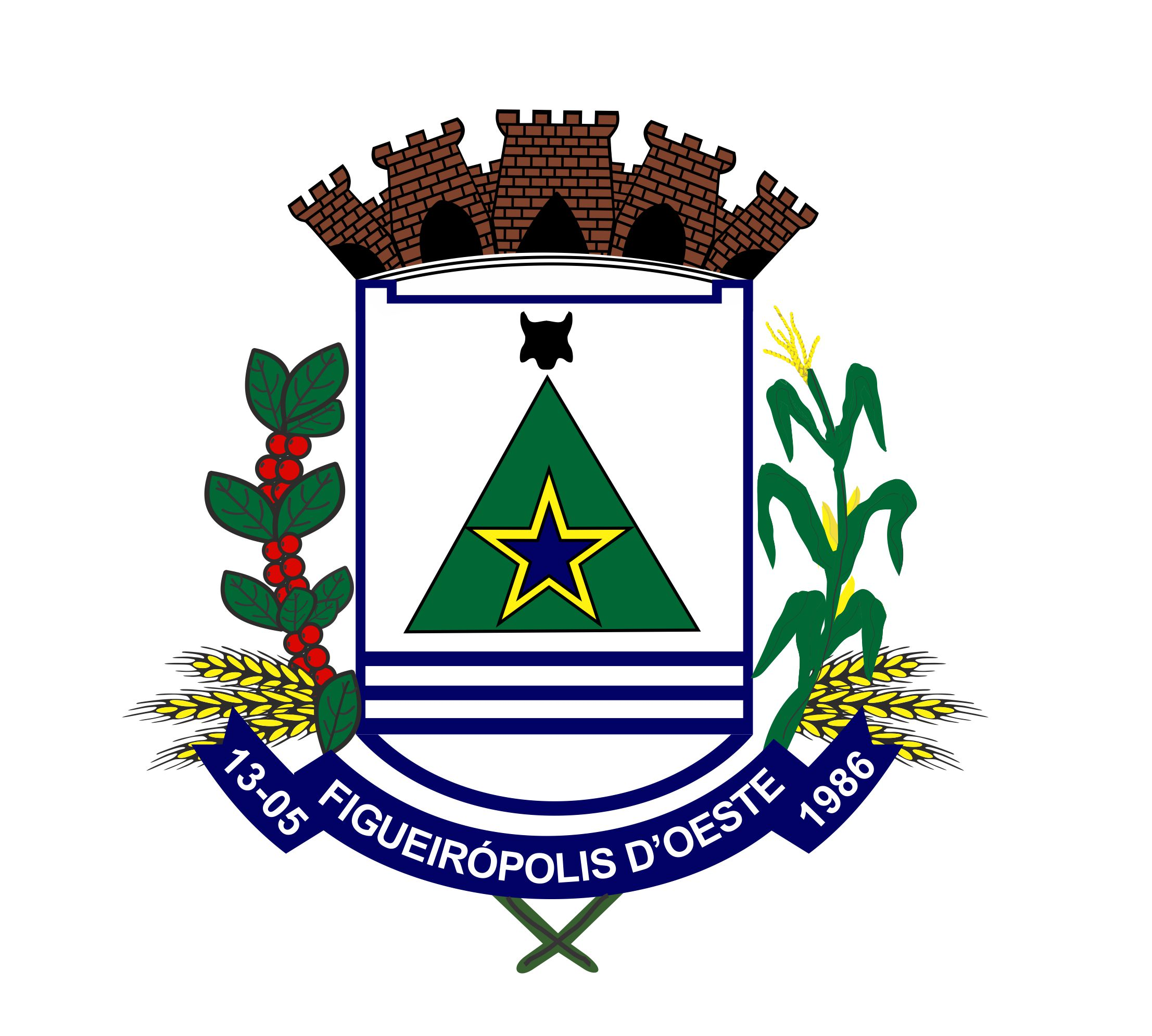
- Flag Coat of arms

- Country: Brazil
- Region: Center-West
- State: Mato Grosso
- Mesoregion: Sudoeste Mato-Grossense

Population (2020)
  - Total: 3,452
- Time zone: UTC−3 (BRT)

Figueirópolis d'Oeste is a municipality in the state of Mato Grosso in the Central-West Region of Brazil.

== Climate ==
Figueirópolis d'Oeste is classified as tropical savanna climate (Köppen climate classification: Aw). The rainy season begins on October and ends on April.

== See also ==
- List of municipalities in Mato Grosso
