= Denise, Mato Grosso =

Coordinates: 14°44′24″S 57°03′14″W

Denise
- Municipality
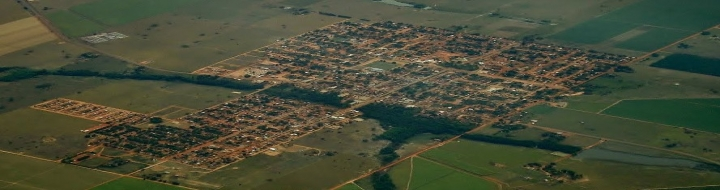
- Aerial view of Denise

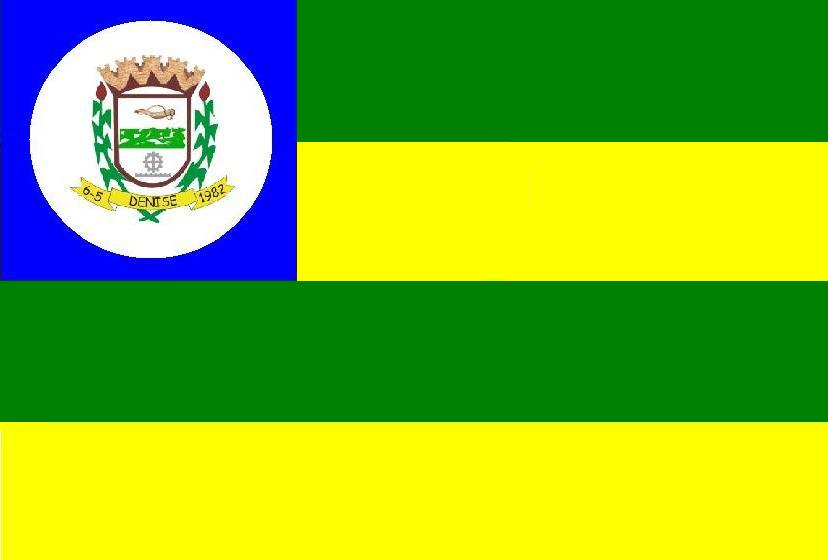
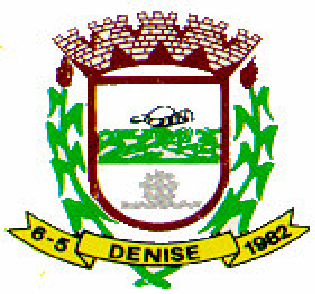
- Flag Coat of arms

- Country: Brazil
- Region: Southeast
- State: Mato Grosso
- Mesoregion: Sudoeste Mato-Grossense

Population (2020)
  - Total: 9,544
- Time zone: UTC−3 (BRT)

Denise is a municipality in the state of Mato Grosso in the Central-West Region of Brazil.

== See also ==
- List of municipalities in Mato Grosso
