= Rio Branco, Mato Grosso =

Coordinates: 15.2408°S 58.1158°W

Rio Branco
- Municipality
- Country: Brazil
- Region: Southeast
- State: Mato Grosso
- Mesoregion: Sudoeste Mato-Grossense

Population (2020)
  - Total: 5,150
- Time zone: UTC−3 (BRT)

Rio Branco is a municipality in the state of Mato Grosso in the Central-West Region of Brazil.

== See also ==
- List of municipalities in Mato Grosso
