= Alto Paraguai =

Coordinates: 14°30′S 56°31′W

- Municipality
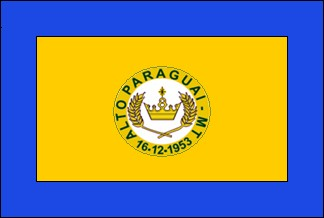
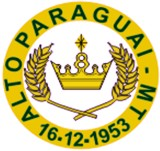
- Flag Seal

- Country: Brazil
- Region: Center-West
- State: Mato Grosso
- Mesoregion: Centro-Sul Mato-Grossense

Population (2020)
  - Total: 11,473
- Time zone: UTC−3 (BRT)

Alto Paraguai is a municipality in the state of Mato Grosso in the Mid-West of Brazil.

== See also ==
- List of municipalities in Mato Grosso
