= União do Sul =

Coordinates: 11.5328°S 54.3528°W

- Municipality
- Country: Brazil
- Region: Center-West
- State: Mato Grosso
- Mesoregion: Norte Mato-Grossense

Population (2020)
  - Total: 3,490
- Time zone: UTC−3 (BRT)

União do Sul is a municipality in the state of Mato Grosso in the Central-West Region of Brazil.

== See also ==
- List of municipalities in Mato Grosso
