= Tabaporã =

Coordinates: 10.8069°S 56.62°W

- Municipality
- Country: Brazil
- Region: Center-West
- State: Mato Grosso
- Mesoregion: Norte Mato-Grossense

Population (2020)
  - Total: 9,429
- Time zone: UTC−3 (BRT)

Tabaporã is a municipality in the state of Mato Grosso in the Central-West Region of Brazil.

== See also ==
- List of municipalities in Mato Grosso
