= Itaúba =

Coordinates: 11°03′43″S 55°16′33″W

- Municipality
- Country: Brazil
- Region: Center-West
- State: Mato Grosso
- Mesoregion: Norte Mato-Grossense

Population (2020)
  - Total: 3,704
- Time zone: UTC−3 (BRT)

Itaúba is a municipality in the state of Mato Grosso in the Central-West Region of Brazil.

== See also ==
- List of municipalities in Mato Grosso
