= Araputanga =

Coordinates: 15.4708°S 58.3528°W

- Municipality
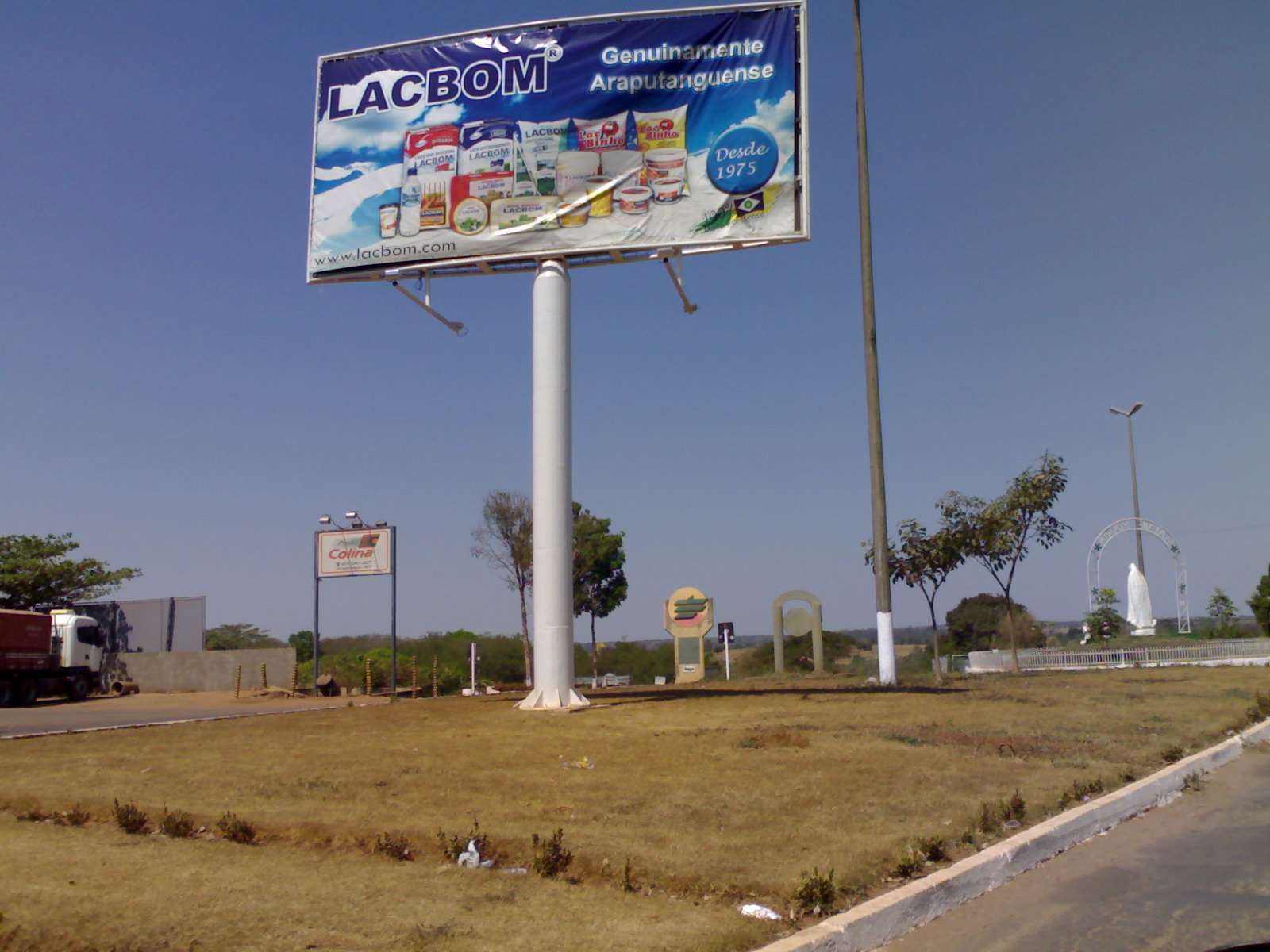

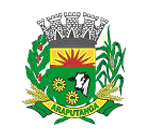
- Coat of arms

- Country: Brazil
- Region: Center-West
- State: Mato Grosso
- Mesoregion: Sudoeste Mato-Grossense

Population (2020)
  - Total: 16,951
- Time zone: UTC−3 (BRT)

Araputanga is a municipality in the state of Mato Grosso in the Central-West Region of Brazil.

== See also ==
- List of municipalities in Mato Grosso
