= Tapurah =

Coordinates: 12.7719°S 56.5539°W

- Municipality
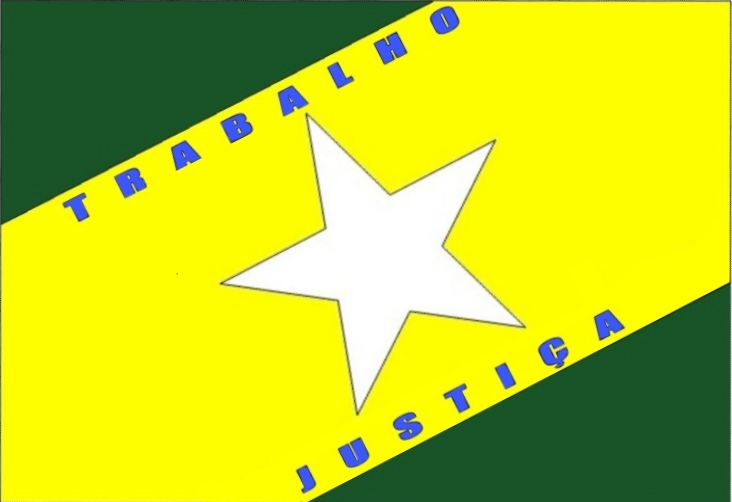
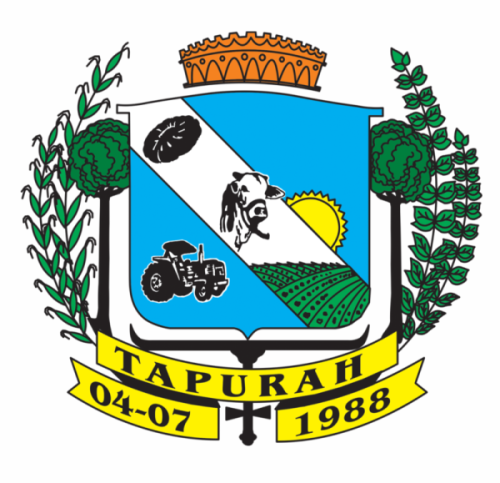
- Flag Coat of arms

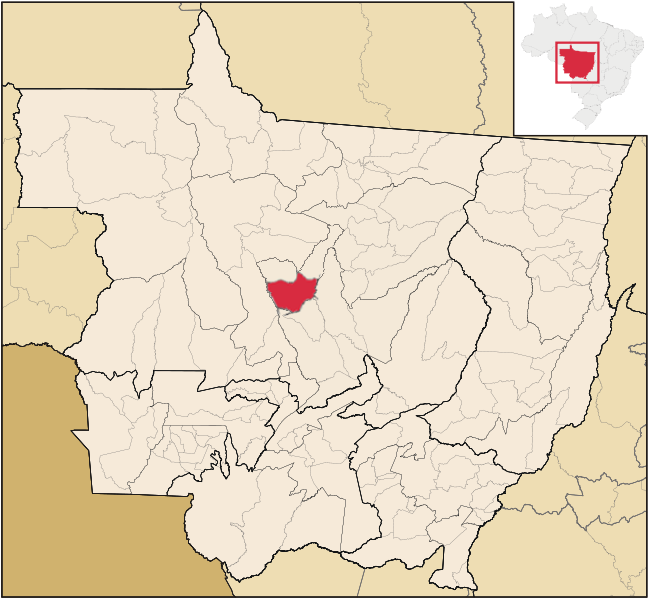
- Country: Brazil
- Region: Center-West
- State: Mato Grosso
- Mesoregion: Norte Mato-Grossense

Population (2020)
  - Total: 14,046
- Time zone: UTC−3 (BRT)

Tapurah is a municipality in the state of Mato Grosso in the Central-West Region of Brazil.

== See also ==
- List of municipalities in Mato Grosso
