= Novo Santo Antônio, Mato Grosso =

Novo Santo Antônio
- Municipality
- The Municipality of Novo Santo Antônio
- Location of Novo Santo Antônio in Maranhão state
- Coordinates: 12°17′24″S 50°58′04″W
- Country: Brazil
- Region: Central-West
- State: Mato Grosso
- Founded: September 29, 1999

Government
  - Mayor: Valdemir Antonio da Silva (PMDB)

Area
  - Total: 4,368.459 km^{2} (1,686.671 sq mi)
- Elevation: 200 m (660 ft)

Population (2020)
  - Total: 2,705
  - Density: 0.3/km^{2} (0.78/sq mi)
- Time zone: UTC−3 (BRT)

Novo Santo Antônio is a municipality in the Brazilian state of Mato Grosso.
