= Torixoréu =

Coordinates: 16°15′S 52°26′W

- Municipality
- Country: Brazil
- Region: Center-West
- State: Mato Grosso
- Mesoregion: Sudeste Mato-Grossense

Population (2020)
  - Total: 3,547
- Time zone: UTC−3 (BRT)
- Website: torixoreu.mt.gov.br

Torixoréu is a municipality in the state of Mato Grosso in the Central-West Region of Brazil.

== See also ==
- List of municipalities in Mato Grosso
