= Nova Nazaré =

Coordinates: 13.9958°S 51.7919°W

- Municipality
- Country: Brazil
- Region: Center-West
- State: Mato Grosso
- Mesoregion: Nordeste Mato-Grossense

Population (2020)
  - Total: 3,932
- Time zone: UTC−3 (BRT)

Nova Nazaré is a municipality in the state of Mato Grosso in the Central-West Region of Brazil.

== See also ==
- List of municipalities in Mato Grosso
