= São José do Rio Claro =

Coordinates: 13.4469°S 56.7208°W

- Municipality
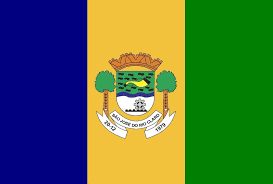
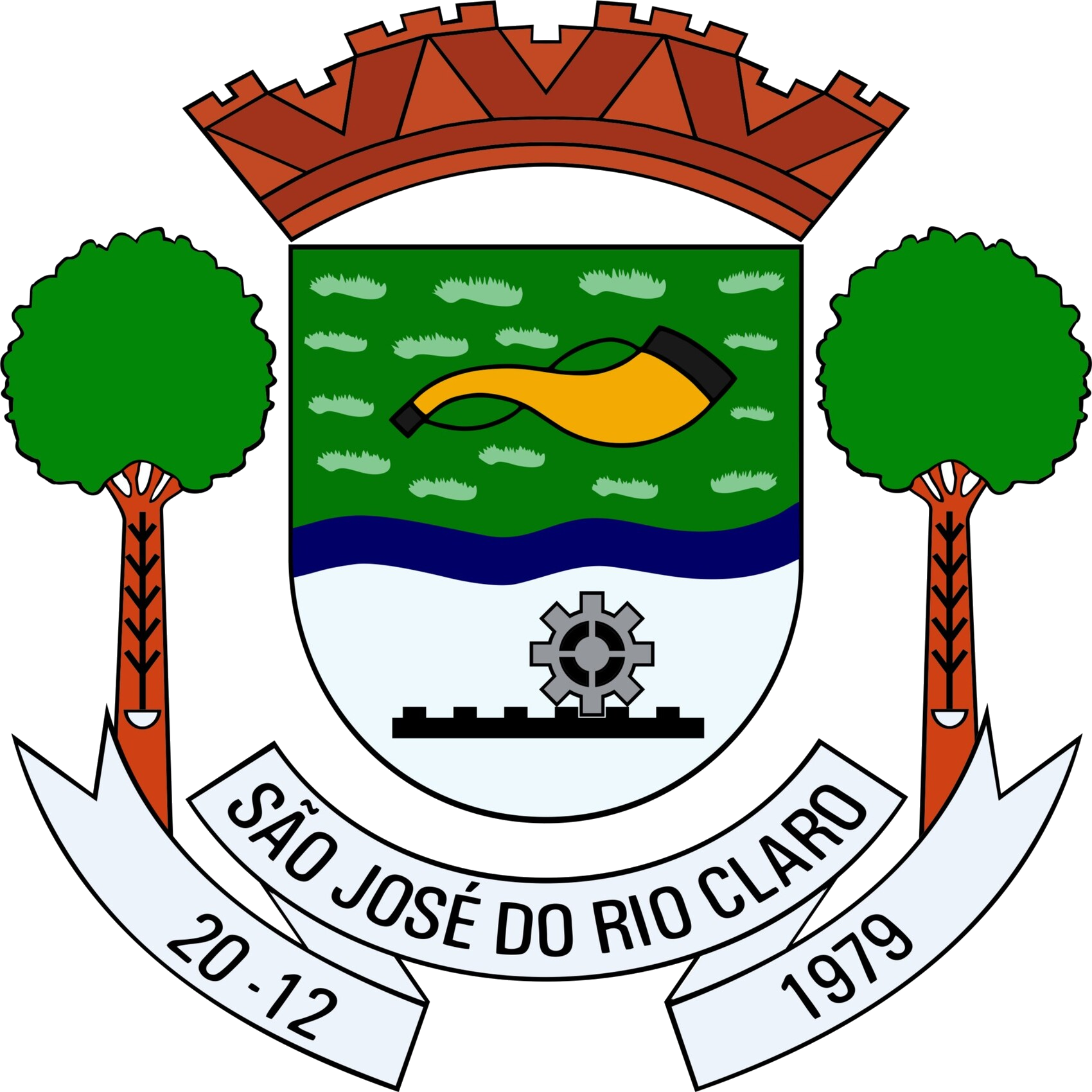
- Flag Coat of arms

- Country: Brazil
- Region: Center-West
- State: Mato Grosso
- Mesoregion: Norte Mato-Grossense

Population (2020)
  - Total: 21,011
- Time zone: UTC−3 (BRT)

São José do Rio Claro is a municipality in the state of Mato Grosso in the Central-West Region of Brazil.

== Climate ==
Climate data for São José do Rio Claro (1981–2010)
Month	Jan	Feb	Mar	Apr	May	Jun	Jul	Aug	Sep	Oct	Nov	Dec	Year
Mean daily maximum °C (°F)	31.6 (88.9)	31.6 (88.9)	32.0 (89.6)	32.3 (90.1)	31.7 (89.1)	32.4 (90.3)	33.0 (91.4)	34.9 (94.8)	34.8 (94.6)	34.1 (93.4)	32.8 (91.0)	31.7 (89.1)	32.7 (90.9)
Mean daily minimum °C (°F)	21.6 (70.9)	21.6 (70.9)	21.6 (70.9)	20.5 (68.9)	17.9 (64.2)	15.7 (60.3)	14.4 (57.9)	15.5 (59.9)	18.8 (65.8)	20.6 (69.1)	21.4 (70.5)	21.2 (70.2)	19.2 (66.6)
Average precipitation mm (inches)	265.2 (10.44)	193.7 (7.63)	146.0 (5.75)	95.3 (3.75)	36.0 (1.42)	11.2 (0.44)	—	6.5 (0.26)	36.7 (1.44)	121.0 (4.76)	145.1 (5.71)	244.9 (9.64)	—
Average relative humidity (%)	90.2	91.0	89.9	88.2	84.4	81.3	76.8	72.9	76.2	82.7	87.1	89.2	84.2
Mean monthly sunshine hours	126.3	125.6	153.4	196.3	215.8	227.9	262.7	240.0	148.1	170.7	151.6	129.6	2,148
Source: Instituto Nacional de Meteorologia

== See also ==
- List of municipalities in Mato Grosso
