= Canabrava do Norte =

Coordinates: 11.0539°S 51.8308°W

- Municipality
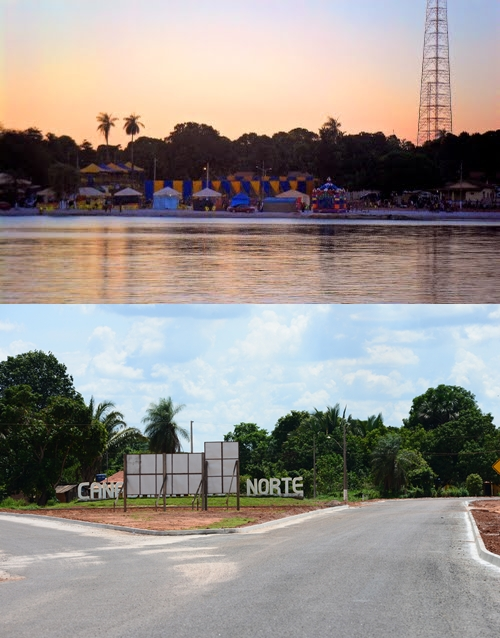

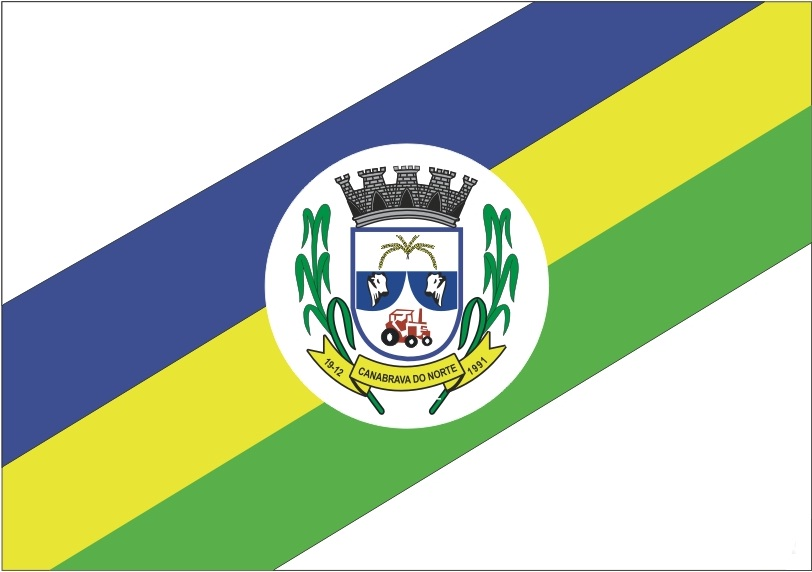
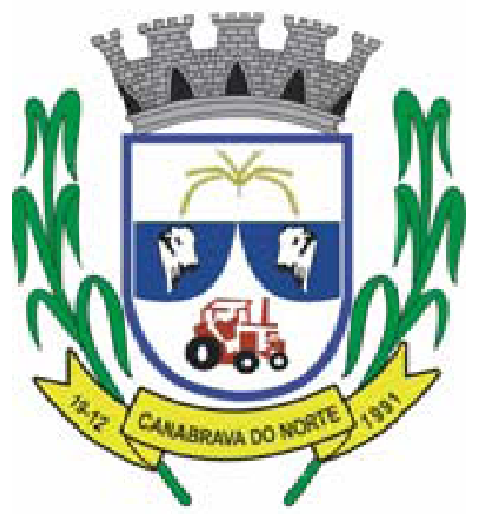
- Flag Coat of arms

- Country: Brazil
- Region: Center-West
- State: Mato Grosso
- Mesoregion: Nordeste Mato-Grossense

Population (2020)
  - Total: 4,728
- Time zone: UTC−3 (BRT)

Canabrava do Norte is a municipality in the state of Mato Grosso in the Central-West Region of Brazil.

== See also ==
- List of municipalities in Mato Grosso
