= Serra Nova Dourada =

Coordinates: 12.0919°S 51.4019°W

- Municipality
- Country: Brazil
- Region: Center-West
- State: Mato Grosso
- Mesoregion: Nordeste Mato-Grossense

Population (2020)
  - Total: 1,678
- Time zone: UTC−3 (BRT)

Serra Nova Dourada is a municipality in the state of Mato Grosso in the Central-West Region of Brazil.

== See also ==
- List of municipalities in Mato Grosso
