= Nova Ubiratã =

- Municipality
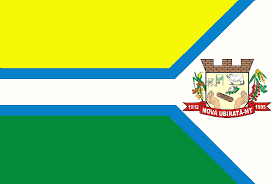
- Flag

- Location of Nova Ubiratã in Mato Grosso

- Location of Nova Ubiratã in Brazil
- Coordinates: 12.9908°S 55.255°W
- Country: Brazil
- Region: Center-West
- State: Mato Grosso
- Mesoregion: Norte Mato-Grossense

Government
  - Mayor: Edegar José Bernardi
  - Vice-mayor: Eder Leandro Setter
  - President of the Municipal Chamber: Leonildo Antônio

Population (2020)
  - Total: 12,298
- Time zone: UTC−3 (BRT)
- GDP (2015): R$ 700 million
- GDP per capita (2023): R$ 27622.26

Nova Ubiratã is a municipality in the state of Mato Grosso in the Central-West Region of Brazil.

The municipality holds the 131,795 hectares (325,670 acres) Rio Ronuro Ecological Station, a strictly protected conservation unit created in 1998.

== History ==
Manoel Pinheiro was the founder of Nova Ubiratã and also the one who chose the name Ubiratã, which, according to the oldest residents, refers to the name of the farm where the settlement developed. Another possible origin of the name is that it is a tribute to the city of the same name in Paraná, from where the first settlers came.

Among the families who first arrived at the settlement were the Feijó, the Setter, and the Ross. The colonizing company was Comércio de Imóveis Pinheiro Ltda. (COMIPIL), whose main shareholder was Manoel Pinheiro.

== Politics ==
The municipality of Nova Ubiratã has a political and administrative structure composed of the executive branch, headed by a mayor elected by direct vote and the legislative branch, embodied by the Câmara Municipal de Nova Ubiratã (Municipal Chamber of Nova Ubiratã), a collegial body representing the municipality's residents, composed of elected councillors who are also elected by direct vote.

As of January 2025, the mayor of Nova Ubiratã is Edegar José Bernardi, the vice-mayor is Eder Leandro, Setter and the President of the Municipal Chamber is Leonildo Antônio.

== See also ==
- List of municipalities in Mato Grosso
