= Ponte Branca =

Coordinates: 16°27′S 52°40′W

- Municipality
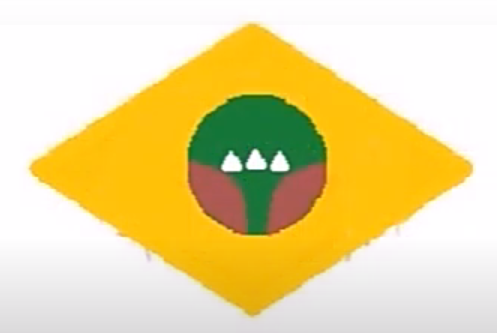
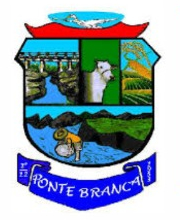
- Flag Coat of arms

- Country: Brazil
- Region: Center-West
- State: Mato Grosso
- Mesoregion: Sudeste Mato-Grossense

Population (2020)
  - Total: 1,550
- Time zone: UTC−3 (BRT)

Ponte Branca is a municipality in the state of Mato Grosso in the Central-West Region of Brazil.

== See also ==
- List of municipalities in Mato Grosso
