= Santa Cruz do Xingu =

Coordinates: 10.155°S 52.3919°W

- Municipality
- Location in Mato Grosso
- Country: Brazil
- Region: Center-West
- State: Mato Grosso
- Mesoregion: Nordeste Mato-Grossense

Population (2020)
  - Total: 2,633
- Time zone: UTC−3 (BRT)

Santa Cruz do Xingu is a municipality in the state of Mato Grosso in the Central-West Region of Brazil.

The municipality contains the 95,024-hectare (234,810-acre) Xingu State Park, created in 2001.

== See also ==
- List of municipalities in Mato Grosso
