= Araguainha =

Coordinates: 16°49′S 53°05′W

- Municipality
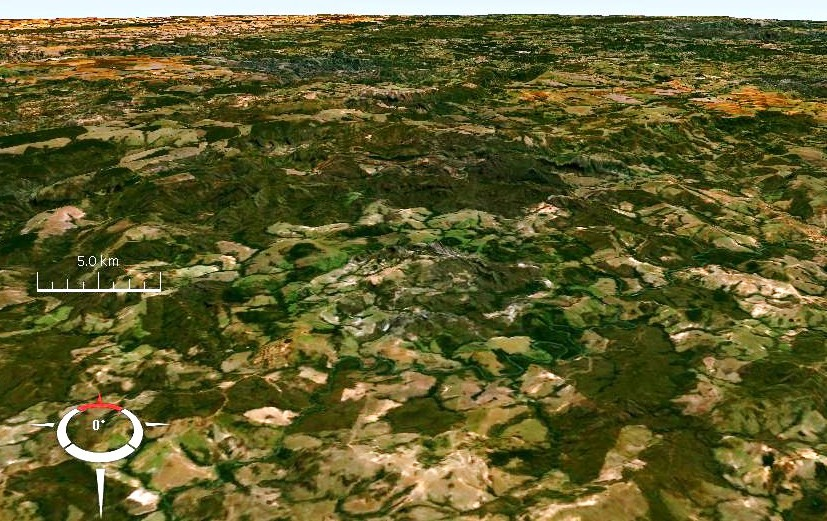

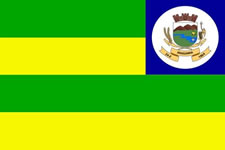
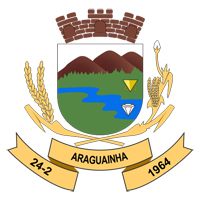
- Flag Coat of arms

- Country: Brazil
- Region: Center-West
- State: Mato Grosso
- Mesoregion: Sudeste Mato-Grossense

Population (2020)
  - Total: 946
- Time zone: UTC−3 (BRT)

Araguainha is a municipality in the state of Mato Grosso in the Central-West Region of Brazil.

== See also ==
- List of municipalities in Mato Grosso
