= Bom Jesus do Araguaia =

- Municipality
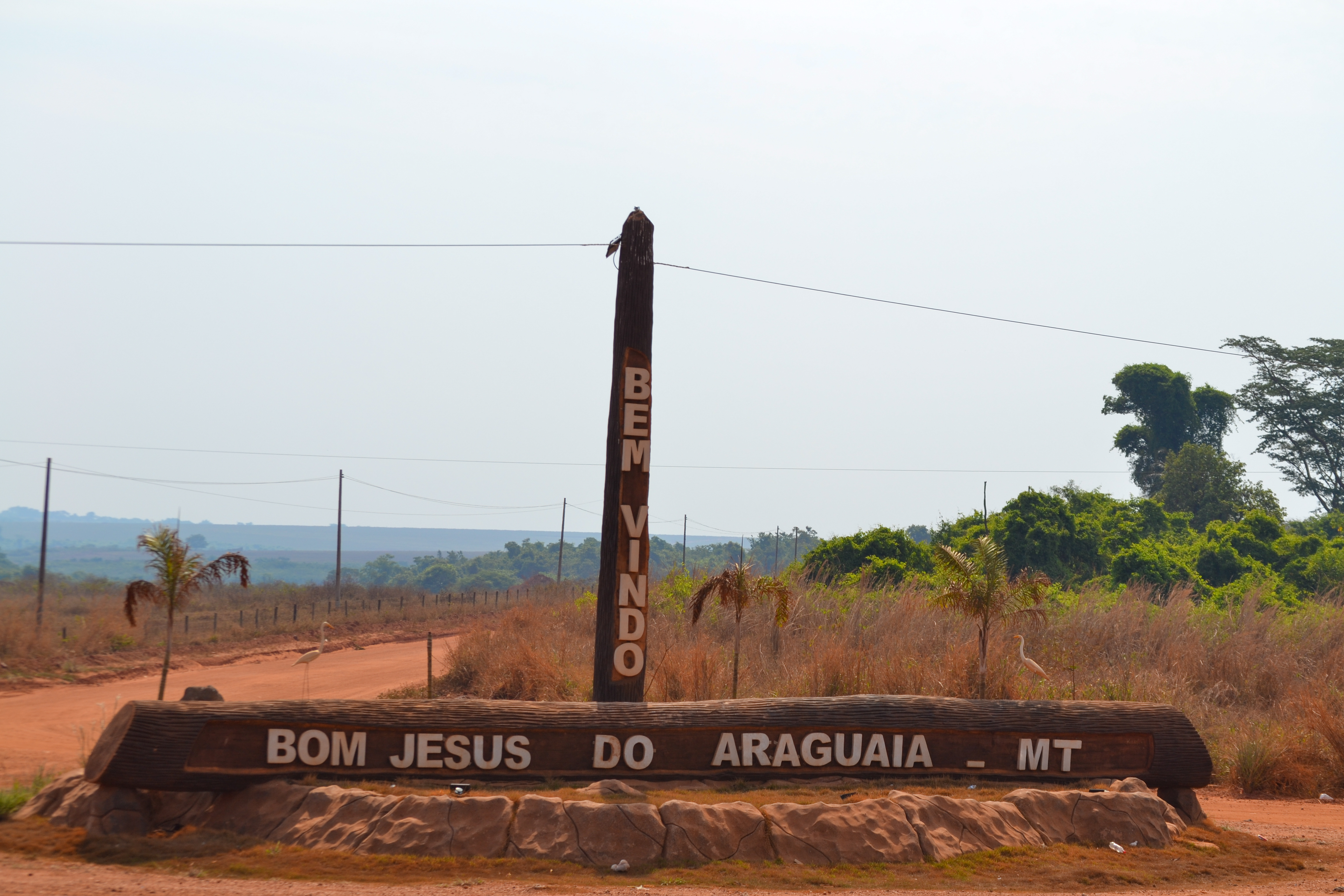

- Location of Bom Jesus do Araguaia in Mato Grosso

- Location of Bom Jesus do Araguaia in Brazil
- Coordinates: 12°10′40″S 51°30′21″W
- Country: Brazil
- Region: Center-West
- State: Mato Grosso
- Mesoregion: Nordeste Mato-Grossense

Population (2020)
  - Total: 6,706
- Time zone: UTC−3 (BRT)

Bom Jesus do Araguaia is a municipality in the state of Mato Grosso in the Central-West Region of Brazil.

== History ==
The municipality of Bom Jesus do Araguaia was created through law nº 7,174, of September 29, 1999, authored by deputy Humberto Bosaipo from territory separated from the municipalities of Ribeirão Cascalheira and Alto Boa Vista.

== Divisions ==
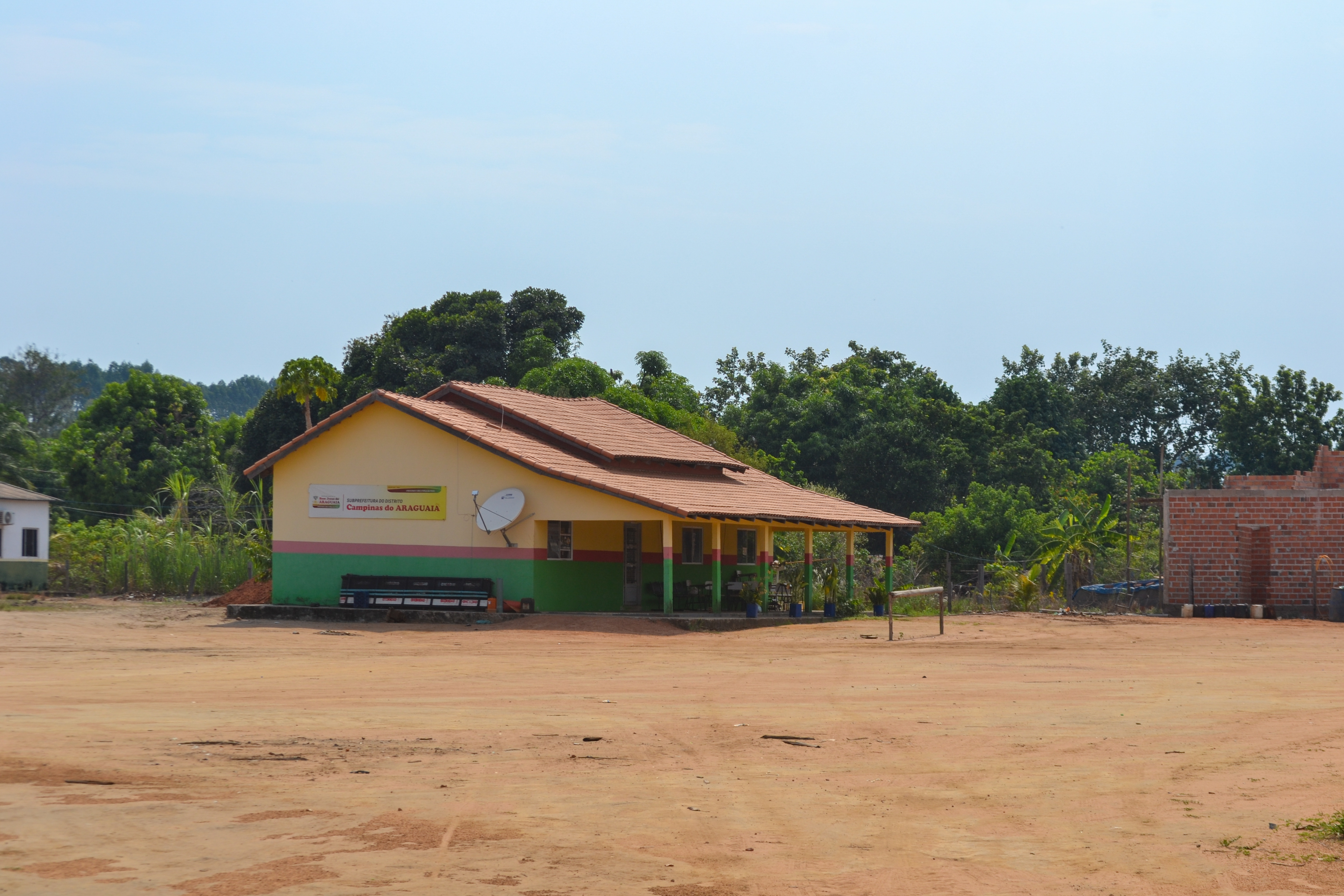
Campinas do Araguaia

In addition to the headquarters, the municipality of Bom Jesus do Araguaia has the districts of Planalto do Araguaia and Vila Campinas do Araguaia, all on the edge of the BR-158 highway. Until the year 2024, both did not have paving on their streets.

In 2024, a partnership was signed between the State Government and the city hall for asphalt paving of the streets of Vila Campinas do Araguaia, which exceeds the value of 7 million.

Planalto do Araguaia was officially created by law Nº230-2010 on 06/08/2010.

== See also ==
- List of municipalities in Mato Grosso
