= Ribeirãozinho =

Coordinates: 16.485°S 52.6919°W

- Municipality
- Flag

- Country: Brazil
- Region: Center-West
- State: Mato Grosso
- Mesoregion: Sudeste Mato-Grossense

Population (2020)
  - Total: 2,422
- Time zone: UTC−3 (BRT)

Ribeirãozinho is a municipality in the state of Mato Grosso in the Central-West Region of Brazil.

== See also ==
- List of municipalities in Mato Grosso
