= Pontal do Araguaia =

Coordinates: 15.9339°S 52.3169°W

- Municipality
- Flag

- Country: Brazil
- Region: Center-West
- State: Mato Grosso
- Mesoregion: Sudeste Mato-Grossense

Population (2020)
  - Total: 6,843
- Time zone: UTC−3 (BRT)
- Website: pontaldoaraguaia.mt.gov.br

Pontal do Araguaia is a municipality in the state of Mato Grosso in the Central-West Region of Brazil.

== See also ==
- List of municipalities in Mato Grosso
