= Apiacás =

- Municipality
- The Municipality of Apiacás
- Location of Apiacás

- Location within Brazil
- Coordinates: 09°32′38″S 57°26′56″W
- Country: Brazil
- Region: Central-West
- State: Mato Grosso
- Founded: January 1, 2001

Government
  - Mayor: Silda Kochemborger

Area
  - Total: 20,364.204 km^{2} (7,862.663 sq mi)
- Elevation: 200 m (660 ft)

Population (2020)
  - Total: 10,283
  - Density: 0.3/km^{2} (0.78/sq mi)
- Time zone: UTC−3 (BRT)
- HDI (2000): 0.713 – medium

Apiacás is the northernmost municipality in the Brazilian state of Mato Grosso. It is the only city in a territorial "edge" of Mato Grosso that "pierces" the boundary between Amazonas and Pará.

The municipality contains part of the 19,582 square kilometres (7,561 sq mi) Juruena National Park, one of the largest conservation units in Brazil.
