= Nova Maringá =

Coordinates: 13.0258°S 57.0739°W

- Municipality
- Country: Brazil
- Region: Center-West
- State: Mato Grosso
- Mesoregion: Norte Mato-Grossense

Population (2020)
  - Total: 8,850
- Time zone: UTC−3 (BRT)

Nova Maringá is a municipality in the state of Mato Grosso in the Central-West Region of Brazil. Nova Maringá is the municipality where the highest temperature ever measured in Brazil was recorded: 44.8 °C on the 4th and 5th of November 2020 (unofficial and dubious, not recognized by INMET).

== See also ==
- List of municipalities in Mato Grosso
