= Nossa Senhora do Livramento, Mato Grosso =

Livramento de Nosaa Senhora
- Municipality
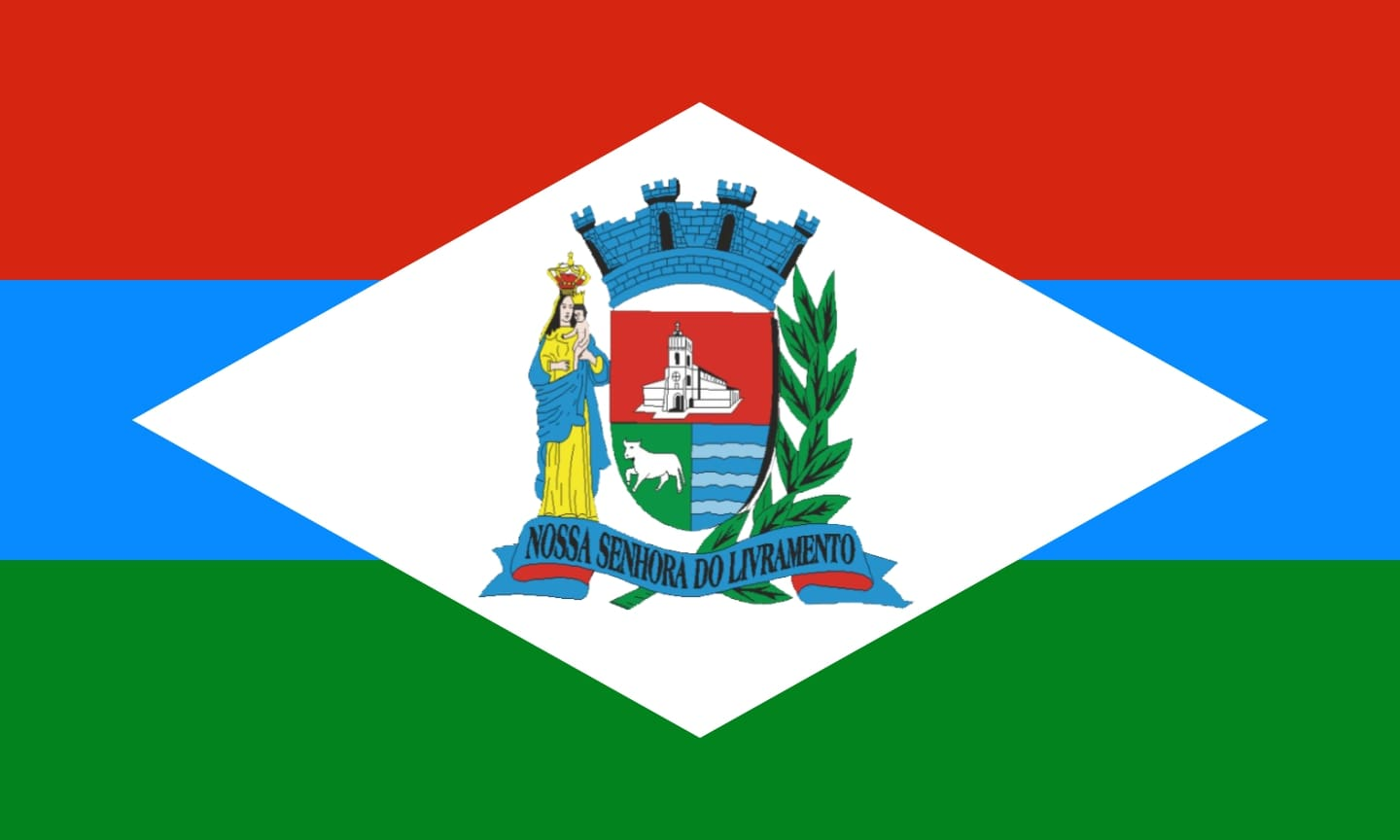
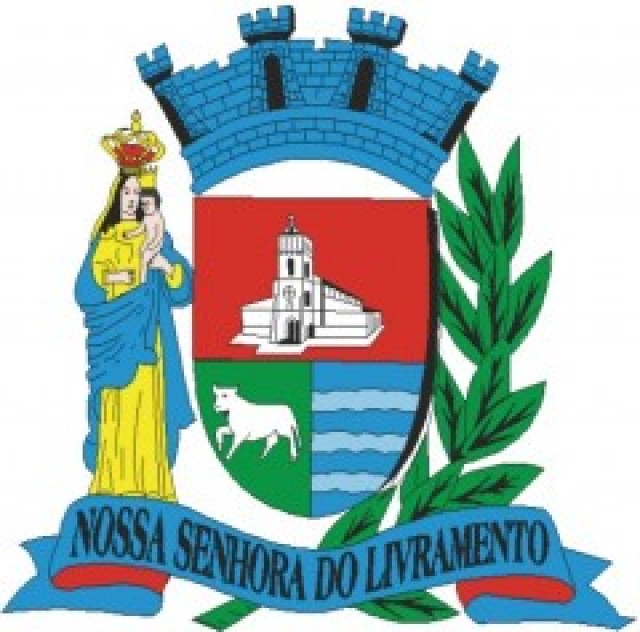
- Flag Coat of arms

- Location of Nossa Senhora do Livramento in Brazil
- Coordinates: 15°46′30″S 56°20′44″W
- Country: Brazil
- Region: Central-West
- State: Mato Grosso
- Mesoregion: Centro-Sul Mato-Grossense
- Microregion: Cuiabá
- Founded: 1885

Area
  - Total: 5,076.78 km^{2} (1,960.16 sq mi)
- Elevation: 232 m (761 ft)

Population (2020)
  - Total: 13,104
  - Density: 2.5812/km^{2} (6.6852/sq mi)
- Time zone: UTC−4 (BRT)
- Postal code (CEP): 78170-xxx

Nossa Senhora do Livramento is a municipality in the state of Mato Grosso, Brazil. The population is 13,104 (2020 est.) in an area of 5076.78 km^{2}. Its elevation is 232 m.
