= Luciára =

Coordinates: 10°45′S 50°34′W

- Municipality
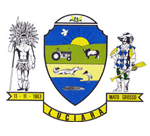
- Coat of arms

- Country: Brazil
- Region: Center-West
- State: Mato Grosso
- Mesoregion: Nordeste Mato-Grossense

Population (2020)
  - Total: 2,058
- Time zone: UTC -3

Luciára is a municipality in the state of Mato Grosso in the Central-West Region of Brazil.

== See also ==
- List of municipalities in Mato Grosso
