= Time in Brazil =

Time in Brazil, since 25 April 2019 Time in Brazil: ACT / Acre Time / UTC−5 / (BRT–2); AMT / Amazon Time / UTC−4 / (BRT−1); BRT / Brasília Time / UTC−3 / (BRT); FNT / Fernando de Noronha Time / UTC−2 / (BRT+1)

Time in Brazil is calculated using standard time, and the country (including its offshore islands) is divided into four standard time zones: Fernando de Noronha time (UTC−02:00), Brasília time (UTC−03:00), Amazon time (UTC−04:00), and Acre time (UTC−05:00). About 93% of the Brazilian population live in Brasília time (UTC−03:00).

== Time zones ==
=== Fernando de Noronha time (UTC−02:00) ===
This is the standard time zone only on a few small offshore Atlantic islands. The only such island with a permanent population is Fernando de Noronha, with 3,167 inhabitants (2022 census), 0.0016% of Brazil's population. The other islands (Trindade and Martim Vaz, Rocas Atoll and Saint Peter and Saint Paul Archipelago) either are totally uninhabited or have small seasonally rotating Brazilian Navy garrisons or teams of scientists.

=== Brasília time (UTC−03:00) ===
The main time zone of Brazil comprises the states in the South, Southeast and Northeast regions (except the small islands mentioned above), plus the states of Goiás, Tocantins, Pará and Amapá, and the Federal District, which includes the national capital city, Brasília. About 93% of the Brazilian population live in this time zone, which covers about 60% of the country's land area.

=== Amazon time (UTC−04:00) ===
This time zone is used in the states of Mato Grosso, Mato Grosso do Sul, Rondônia, Roraima, and most of Amazonas. Although this time zone covers about 36% of the land area of Brazil (an area larger than Argentina), only about 6% of the country's population live there (about 12 million people, slightly more than the city of São Paulo).

Until 2008, the part of the state of Pará west of the Jari and Xingu rivers was also part of this time zone; then it joined the rest of the state in observing Brasília time (UTC−03:00). Although other changes to Brazilian time zones enacted at that time have since been reverted (see below), western Pará still remains in UTC−03:00.

=== Acre time (UTC−05:00) ===
This time zone was reinstated in late 2013, after having been abolished for over five years. It is used in the far-western tip of the country, which includes the entire state of Acre and the southwestern portion of the state of Amazonas (west of a line connecting the cities of Tabatinga and Porto Acre). (Note: The municipalities of Atalaia do Norte, Eirunepé, Envira, Guajará and Ipixuna are located entirely west of the line. Part of the municipalities of Benjamin Constant and Tabatinga, including their seats and most of their population, are also located west of the line. Part of the municipalities of Boca do Acre, Itamarati, Jutaí, Pauini and São Paulo de Olivença are located west of the line, but their seats and almost their entire population are located east of it. Amaturá and Lábrea are sometimes cited as municipalities in UTC−05:00, but they are located entirely east of the line. The seat of Lábrea uses UTC−04:00.) These areas cover only about 4% of the Brazilian territory (although that is still about the size of Germany) and have only about 0.5% of the country's population (little more than one million people).

On 24 June 2008, these areas advanced their clocks by an hour, so that they became part of the UTC−04:00 time zone. However, in a non-binding referendum held on 31 October 2010, a slight majority of Acre voters voted in favour of returning the state to UTC−05:00. On 30 October 2013, Brazilian President Dilma Rousseff enacted Law 12876 which was passed by Congress on 8 October, establishing that the time zone switch would occur on Sunday, 10 November 2013. Since then, the state of Acre and the southwestern part of the state of Amazonas are again 5 hours behind UTC.

=== Unofficial observance ===
Unofficially, 32 municipalities in eastern Mato Grosso, (Note: Água Boa, Alto Araguaia, Alto Boa Vista, Alto Taquari, Araguaiana, Araguainha, Barra do Garças, Bom Jesus do Araguaia, Campinápolis, Canabrava do Norte, Canarana, Cocalinho, Confresa, General Carneiro, Luciara, Nova Nazaré, Nova Xavantina, Novo Santo Antônio, Novo São Joaquim, Pontal do Araguaia, Ponte Branca, Porto Alegre do Norte, Querência, Ribeirão Cascalheira, Ribeirãozinho, Santa Cruz do Xingu, Santa Terezinha, São Félix do Araguaia, São José do Xingu, Serra Nova Dourada, Torixoréu and Vila Rica.) located in the Araguaia valley, observe UTC−03:00, Brasília time.

Unofficially, some municipalities in eastern Mato Grosso do Sul, such as Bataguassu, Aparecida do Taboado, Cassilândia and Chapadão do Sul, also observe UTC−03:00, Brasília time.

== Daylight saving time ==
Brazil observed daylight saving time (DST; Portuguese: horário de verão, "summer time") in the years of 1931–1933, 1949–1953, 1963–1968 and 1985–2019. Initially it applied to the whole country, but from 1988 it applied only to part of the country, usually the southern regions, where DST is more useful due to a larger seasonal variation in daylight duration. It typically lasted from October or November to February or March.

The most recent DST rule specified advancing the time by one hour during the period from 00:00 on the first Sunday in November to 00:00 on the third Sunday in February (postponed by one week if the latter fell on carnival), applicable only to the South, Southeast and Central-West regions, which comprise about 65% of the Brazilian population. During DST, Brasília time moved from UTC−03:00 to UTC−02:00; the other states that did not follow DST observed a change of the offset to Brasília time.

Brazil abolished DST in 2019.

== IANA time zone database ==
The IANA time zone database contains 16 zones for Brazil. Columns marked with * are from the file zone.tab of the database.

c.c.*	coordinates*	TZ*	comments*	UTC offset	DST
BR	−0351−03225	America/Noronha	Atlantic islands	−02:00	—N/a
BR	−0127−04829	America/Belem	Pará (east), Amapá	−03:00	—N/a
BR	−0343−03830	America/Fortaleza	Brazil (northeast: MA, PI, CE, RN, PB)	−03:00	—N/a
BR	−0803−03454	America/Recife	Pernambuco	−03:00	—N/a
BR	−0712−04812	America/Araguaina	Tocantins	−03:00	—N/a
BR	−0940−03543	America/Maceio	Alagoas, Sergipe	−03:00	—N/a
BR	−1259−03831	America/Bahia	Bahia	−03:00	—N/a
BR	−2332−04637	America/Sao_Paulo	Brazil (southeast: GO, DF, MG, ES, RJ, SP, PR, SC, RS)	−03:00	—N/a
BR	−2027−05437	America/Campo_Grande	Mato Grosso do Sul	−04:00	—N/a
BR	−1535−05605	America/Cuiaba	Mato Grosso	−04:00	—N/a
BR	−0226−05452	America/Santarem	Pará (west)	−03:00	—N/a
BR	−0846−06354	America/Porto_Velho	Rondônia	−04:00	—N/a
BR	+0249−06040	America/Boa_Vista	Roraima	−04:00	—N/a
BR	−0308−06001	America/Manaus	Amazonas (east)	−04:00	—N/a
BR	−0640−06952	America/Eirunepe	Amazonas (west)	−05:00	—N/a
BR	−0958−06748	America/Rio_Branco	Acre	−05:00	—N/a

== See also ==
- Date and time notation in Brazil
- Lists of time zones
