= List of airports by ICAO code: SV-SY =

List of airports by ICAO code: A - B - C - D - EB-EG - EH-EY - FA-FM - FN-FZ - G - H - ~~I~~ - J - KA-KH - KI-KP - KR-KZ - LA-LJ - LK-LZ - M - N - O - P - Q - R - SA-SC - SD-SH - SI - SJ - SK-SM - SN-SP - SQ - SS-SU - SV-SY - T - U - V - W - ~~X~~ - Y - Z

== SV - Venezuela ==
Note: The Venezuela aeronautical information publication lists numerous more aerodromes with ICAO codes than are listed here. They have however been omitted from this list because their existence has not been able to be confirmed.

Also see airport category and list.

ICAO	IATA	Airport name	Community	Coordinates	Notes
SVAA		Araya Aerodrome	Araya, Sucre	10°35′50″N 064°16′19″W	
SVAB		Arekuna Aerodrome	Piar, Bolívar	06°29′06″N 062°53′42″W	
SVAC	AGV	Oswaldo Guevara Mujica Airport	Acarigua, Portuguesa	09°33′12″N 069°14′15″W	
SVAD		Adícora Airport	Adícora, Falcón	11°56′09″N 069°48′42″W	
SVAE		Agropecuaria Caujarote Aerodrome	Ortiz, Guárico	09°15′23″N 067°33′24″W	
SVAJ		Cacurí Aerodrome	Manapiare, Amazonas	04°48′04″N 065°20′23″W	
SVAL		Agua Linda Aerodrome	Ezequiel Zamora, Barinas	07°38′06″N 070°51′00″W	
SVAN	AAO	Anaco Airport	Anaco, Anzoátegui	09°25′49″N 064°28′15″W	
SVAO		Altagracia de Orituco Airport	José Tadeo Monagas, Guárico	09°51′43″N 066°17′23″W	
SVAS	LPJ	Armando Schwarck Airport	Los Pijiguaos, Bolívar	06°34′38″N 066°49′00″W	
SVBA		Bachquero Airport	Bachaquero, Zulia	10°00′05″N 071°05′02″W	
SVBB		Central Venezuela Aerodrome	Bobures, Zulia	09°10′23″N 071°06′46″W	
SVBC	BLA	General José Antonio Anzoátegui International Airport	Barcelona, Anzoátegui	10°06′26″N 064°41′21″W	
SVBD		Doña Bárbara Aerodrome	Barinas Municipality, Barinas	08°10′54″N 070°01′57″W	
SVBE		San Benito Aerodrome	La Cañada de Urdaneta, Zulia	10°16′16″N 072°03′42″W	
SVBG		El Guayabo del Zulia Airport	El Guayabo, Zulia	08°40′34″N 072°20′05″W	
SVBI	BNS	Barinas Airport	Barinas, Barinas	08°37′10″N 070°13′15″W	
SVBL	MYC	El Libertador Air Base	Maracay, Aragua	10°10′50″N 067°33′40″W	
SVBM	BRM	Jacinto Lara International Airport	Barquisimeto, Lara	10°02′34″N 069°21′30″W	
SVBO		Boconó Airport	Boconó, Trujillo	09°15′57″N 070°13′49″W	
SVBS	MYC	Mariscal Sucre Airport (Venezuela)	Maracay, Aragua	10°15′00″N 067°38′58″W	
SVBV		Bajo Verde Aerodrome	Las Mercedes, Guárico	09°04′25″N 066°22′58″W	
SVBW		San Pablo de Barinas Aerodrome	Pedraza, Barinas	07°46′10″N 070°38′01″W	
SVCB	CBL	Tomás de Heres Airport	Ciudad Bolívar, Bolívar	08°07′20″N 063°32′10″W	
SVCD	CXA	Caicara del Orinoco Airport	Caicara del Orinoco	07°37′33″N 066°09′55″W	
SVCF		Callejas Aerodrome	Barinas, Barinas	07°59′37″N 069°38′07″W	
SVCG	CUV	El Cubo Airport	Casigua-El Cubo, Zulia	08°45′25″N 072°32′10″W	
SVCH		El Cajaro Aerodrome	Achaguas, Apure	06°56′06″N 068°08′08″W	
SVCJ		San Carlos Airport	San Carlos, Cojedes	09°38′55″N 068°34′30″W	
SVCL	CLZ	Calabozo Airport	Calabozo, Guárico	08°55′30″N 067°25′00″W	
SVCN	CAJ	Canaima Airport	Canaima National Park, Bolívar	06°13′55″N 062°51′15″W	
SVCO	VCR	Carora Airport	Carora, Lara	10°10′30″N 070°03′55″W	
SVCP	CUP	General José Francisco Bermúdez Airport	Carúpano	10°39′35″N 063°15′40″W	
SVCQ		Caño Lucas Aerodrome	Páez, Portuguesa	09°24′47″N 068°53′20″W	
SVCR	CZE	José Leonardo Chirino Airport	Coro, Falcón	11°24′55″N 069°40′50″W	
SVCS		Óscar Machado Zuloaga International Airport	Charallave, Miranda	10°17′12″N 066°49′00″W	
SVCT		Las Cristinas Aerodrome	Sifontes, Bolívar	06°12′02″N 061°28′15″W	
SVCU	CUM	Antonio José de Sucre Airport	Cumaná, Sucre	10°27′00″N 064°07′50″W	
SVCX		Carbonero Aerodrome	Veroes, Yaracuy	10°24′39″N 068°37′24″W	
SVCZ		Captain Manuel Ríos Aerospace Base	Barbacoas, Aragua	09°22′20″N 066°55′23″W	
SVDK		La Capilla Aerodrome	Guanarito, Portuguesa	08°42′13″N 068°52′26″W	
SVDL		La Loma Aerodrome	Ortiz, Guárico	09°13′29″N 067°30′46″W	
SVDP		Divina Pastora Airport	Divina Pastora, Bolívar	04°41′20″N 061°03′35″W	
SVDR		Hato El Cedral Aerodrome	Muñoz, Apure	07°25′56″N 069°19′29″W	
SVDU		Dabajuro Airport	Dabajuro, Falcón	11°01′39″N 070°41′33″W	
SVDZ	PPZ	Puerto Páez Airport	Puerto Páez, Apure	06°13′10″N 067°26′59″W	
SVED	EOR	El Dorado Airport (Venezuela)	El Dorado	06°42′57″N 061°38′20″W	
SVEF		El Flagelo Aerodrome	Francisco de Miranda, Guárico	09°11′08″N 067°01′57″W	
SVEP		El Palmar Aerodrome	Cagua, Aragua	10°11′53″N 067°26′35″W	
SVEV		Empujeca Aerodrome	Veroes, Yaracuy	10°35′22″N 068°29′55″W	
SVEW		Encontrados Aerodrome	Encontrados, Zulia	09°02′16″N 072°14′53″W	
SVEX		Espina Aerodrome	Infante, Guárico	08°34′39″N 066°01′13″W	
SVEZ	EOZ	Elorza Airport	Elorza, Apure	07°03′35″N 069°29′50″W	
SVFG		Fagotrans Aerodrome	Urdaneta, Aragua	09°24′07″N 066°38′30″W	
SVFM		Generalissimo Francisco de Miranda Air Base	Caracas	10°29′06″N 066°50′37″W	
SVFO		Las Flores Aerodrome	Maturín, Monagas	09°29′48″N 062°54′04″W	
SVFS		Fundo Santa María Aerodrome	Pedraza, Barinas	08°19′51″N 070°16′16″W	
SVFU		La Fortuna Aerodrome	Libertador, Táchira	07°33′23″N 071°27′35″W	
SVFW		Finca Villa Carrara Aerodrome II	Cedeño Municipality, Monagas	09°52′05″N 063°45′08″W	
SVGA		La Paragua Airport	La Paragua, Bolívar	06°50′07″N 063°21′02″W	
SVGD	GDO	Guasdualito Airport	Guasdualito, Apure	07°12′40″N 070°45′25″W	
SVGI	GUI	Güiria Airport	Güiria, Sucre	10°34′25″N 062°18′45″W	
SVGO		El Lego Aerodrome	Paéz Municipality, Barinas	07°56′48″N 069°55′49″W	
SVGP		Ganaderia Pedernales Aerodrome	Guanare, Portuguesa	09°12′36″N 069°34′48″W	
SVGQ		Las Guadalupes Aerodrome	Independencia, Anzoátegui	08°44′57″N 063°33′21″W	
SVGT		Guasipati Airport	Guasipati, Bolívar	07°28′40″N 061°54′28″W	
SVGU	GUQ	Guanare Airport	Guanare, Portuguesa	09°01′40″N 069°45′15″W	
SVHG	HGE	Higuerote Airport	Higuerote, Miranda	10°27′45″N 066°05′35″W	
SVHH		Churuguara Airport	Churuguara, Falcón	10°48′27″N 069°38′18″W	
SVIA		Los Andes Aerodrome	Machiques, Zulia	10°00′01″N 072°34′59″W	
SVIB		La Blanquilla Aerodrome	La Blanquilla Island, Dependencias Federales	11°49′15″N 064°35′12″W	
SVIC	ICA	Icabarú Airport	Icabaru, Bolívar	04°20′15″N 061°44′20″W	
SVID		Dos Mosquises Airport	Dos Mosquises, Dependencias Federales	11°47′40″N 066°53′34″W	
SVIE	ICC	Andrés Miguel Salazar Marcano Airport	Isla de Coche, Nueva Esparta	10°47′40″N 063°58′50″W	
SVIF		La Mision Aerodrome	San Fernando, Apure	07°27′57″N 067°15′35″W	
SVIH		Hato El Carito Aerodrome	Pao de San Juan Bautista, Cojedes	09°28′45″N 067°59′25″W	
SVIJ		Hato La Lejania Aerodrome	Maturín, Monagas	09°05′10″N 063°06′58″W	
SVIL		Los Cocos Aerodrome	Achaguas, Apure	07°26′23″N 068°40′43″W	
SVIT		La Tortuga Aerodrome	La Tortuga Island, Dependencias Federales	10°57′16″N 065°13′26″W	
SVIV		Las Clavellinas Aerodrome	Monte Carmelo, Trujillo	09°19′35″N 070°58′33″W	
SVJB		Hacienda Bella Vista Aerodrome	Barinas, Barinas	08°00′57″N 069°49′56″W	
SVJC	LSP	Josefa Camejo International Airport	Paraguaná, Falcón	11°46′50″N 070°09′00″W	
SVJG		Hacienda El Calvario Aerodrome	Machiques, Zulia	09°53′44″N 072°33′01″W	
SVJH		Hacienda La Chipilona Aerodrome	Acosta, Falcón	10°59′34″N 068°27′12″W	
SVJJ		Las Majaguas Aerodrome	San Rafael de Onoto, Portuguesa	09°39′27″N 068°58′32″W	
SVJL		Hacienda Las Lomas Aerodrome	Veroes, Yaracuy	10°35′39″N 068°32′01″W	
SVJM		Guárico Municipal Airport	San Juan de los Morros, Guárico	09°54′30″N 067°22′40″W	
SVJR		Hacienda Rio Yaza Aerodrome	Machiques, Zulia	09°50′37″N 072°32′50″W	
SVJZ		Hacienda El Oasis Aerodrome	Obispos, Barinas	08°22′06″N 069°57′28″W	
SVKA	KAV	Kavanayén Airport	Bolívar	05°35′35″N 061°45′48″W	
SVKB		La Calzada Aerodrome	Páez, Barinas	07°58′35″N 070°05′31″W	
SVKG		La Gran China Aerodrome	Machiques, Zulia	09°46′36″N 072°29′10″W	
SVKK		San Luis de Capanaparo Aerodrome	Achaguas, Apure	07°00′15″N 068°24′36″W	
SVKM	KTV	Kamarata Airport	Bolívar	05°43′00″N 062°20′15″W	
SVKN		La Candelaria Aerodrome	Silva, Falcón	10°43′38″N 068°19′59″W	
SVKO		La Coromoto Aerodrome	Colón, Zulia	08°48′07″N 071°43′12″W	
SVLB		La Bananera Aerodrome	Veroes, Yaracuy	10°28′46″N 068°28′22″W	
SVLF	LFR	La Fría Airport	La Fría, Táchira	08°14′20″N 072°16′15″W	
SVLL		El Callao Aerodrome	El Callao, Bolívar	07°20′01″N 061°49′46″W	
SVLM		La Marinera Aerodrome	Aguasay, Monagas	09°12′27″N 063°22′24″W	
SVLN		Las Nieves Aerodrome	Cedeño, Bolívar	06°35′23″N 066°13′03″W	
SVLO		La Orchila Airport	La Orchila, Dependencias Federales (Venezuela)	11°48′30″N 066°10′48″W	
SVLP		Luepa Aerodrome	Gran Sabana, Bolívar	05°47′29″N 061°26′26″W	
SVLQ		Los Quitasoles Aerodrome	Páez, Apure	07°43′44″N 069°55′37″W	
SVLW		La Vigia Oeste Aerodrome	Juan Germán Roscio, Guárico	09°38′32″N 067°02′23″W	
SVLY		La Yagua Aerodrome	Achaguas, Apure	07°17′31″N 068°31′54″W	
SVMB		Macana Aerodrome	Rosario de Perijá, Zulia	09°55′26″N 072°04′37″W	
SVMC	MAR	La Chinita International Airport	Maracaibo, Zulia	10°33′30″N 071°43′40″W	
SVMD	MRD	Alberto Carnevalli Airport	Mérida, Mérida	08°34′56″N 071°09′40″W	
SVMF		Merecure Aerodrome	Pedro Camejo, Apure	07°30′46″N 067°48′24″W	
SVMG	PMV	Santiago Mariño Caribbean International Airport	Porlamar, Isla Margarita	10°54′50″N 063°58′05″W	
SVMI	CCS	Simón Bolívar International Airport (Maiquetía International Airport)	Maiquetía, Vargas (near Caracas)	10°36′11″N 066°59′26″W	
SVML		Montellano Aerodrome	Rosario de Perijá, Zulia	10°19′44″N 072°28′51″W	
SVMN		Los Mangos Aerodrome	Páez, Barinas	07°56′24″N 070°03′50″W	
SVMO		Maroa Aerodrome	Maroa, Amazonas	02°43′35″N 067°32′45″W	
SVMP		Metropolitano International Airport	Ocumare del Tuy, Miranda	10°08′00″N 066°47′15″W	
SVMQ		Miguelón Aerodrome	Sucre, Zulia	08°59′47″N 071°22′25″W	
SVMS		Marisol Aerodrome	Santa Rosalía, Portuguesa	09°08′46″N 069°03′55″W	
SVMT	MUN	José Tadeo Monagas International Airport	Maturín, Monagas	09°44′55″N 063°09′15″W	
SVMU		Macagua Airport	Caroní, Bolívar	08°16′52″N 062°39′41″W	
SVMW		Mantecal Airport	Muñoz, Apure	07°33′27″N 069°08′28″W	
SVMX		Morichal Aerodrome	Maturín, Monagas	08°49′41″N 063°05′42″W	
SVOA		San Lorenzo De Barinas Airport	San Lorenzo De Barinas, Barinas	08°17′05″N 069°55′00″W	Closed
SVON	CBS	Oro Negro Airport	Cabimas, Zulia	10°19′50″N 071°19′20″W	
SVOP		Oritupano Aerodrome	Aguasay, Monagas	09°03′41″N 063°26′39″W	
SVOS		Los Siete Samanes Aerodrome	Francisco de Miranda, Guárico	08°52′31″N 066°50′23″W	
SVOU		Ouro Branco Tonoro Aerodrome	Pedro María Freites, Anzoátegui	09°28′27″N 063°53′23″W	
SVOW		La Palma Aerodrome	Mauroa, Falcón	10°49′55″N 071°02′19″W	
SVPA	PYH	Cacique Aramare Airport	Puerto Ayacucho, Amazonas	05°37′10″N 067°36′25″W	
SVPC	PBL	General Bartolomé Salom Airport	Puerto Cabello, Carabobo	10°28′45″N 068°04′20″W	
SVPE		Pedernales Airport	Pedernales, Delta Amacuro	09°58′40″N 062°14′00″W	
SVPH		Punta Gorda Aerodrome	Ezequiel Zamora, Monagas	09°38′56″N 063°43′20″W	
SVPI		Ciudad Piar Aerodrome	Ciudad Piar, Bolívar	07°29′32″N 063°16′12″W	
SVPM	SCI	Paramillo Airport	San Cristóbal, Táchira	07°48′05″N 072°12′10″W	
SVPO		Punta de Oro Aerodrome	La Ceiba, Trujillo	09°30′01″N 070°56′54″W	
SVPR	PZO	Manuel Carlos Piar Guayana Airport	Ciudad Guayana, Bolívar	08°17′20″N 062°45′35″W	
SVPT	PMT	Palmarito Airport	Palmarito, Apure	07°34′30″N 070°10′30″W	
SVPU		Pesurca Aerodrome	Pedro Camejo, Apure	06°16′55″N 069°19′37″W	
SVPV		Pisurca Aerodrome	Cedeño, Bolívar	06°54′54″N 066°32′55″W	
SVPW		Piscuri Aerodrome	Libertador, Táchira	07°32′50″N 071°47′17″W	
SVPX	PPH	Parai-tepuí Airport	Parai-tepuí, Bolívar	04°34′13″N 061°31′10″W	
SVPY		Pelayo Aerodrome	Pedro María Freites, Anzoátegui	09°00′46″N 063°39′53″W	
SVQB		Hato Bengala Aerodrome	Francisco de Miranda, Guárico	08°31′22″N 067°41′30″W	
SVQC		Hato El Caimán Aerodrome	Guanare, Portuguesa	09°06′59″N 069°36′55″W	
SVQE		Hato El Bajio Aerodrome	Ricaurte, Cojedes	09°30′09″N 068°44′50″W	
SVQI		Carapa Aerodrome	Infante, Guárico	07°53′48″N 065°52′54″W	
SVQJ		Hacienda San José Aerodrome	La Ceiba, Trujillo	09°27′15″N 071°02′31″W	
SVQL		El Jabillal Aerodrome	Sucre, Trujillo	09°27′10″N 070°46′26″W	
SVQM		Central Matilde Aerodrome	Chivacoa, Yaracuy	10°09′25″N 068°51′39″W	
SVQN		Caseja Aerodrome	Cedeño, Bolívar	06°54′31″N 066°34′20″W	
SVQR		Hato El Carrao Aerodrome	Guanarito, Portuguesa	08°32′37″N 068°48′18″W	
SVQW		Hato Santa Clara Aerodrome	Rómulo Gallegos, Apure	07°07′56″N 069°13′59″W	
SVQZ		Hato Viejo Aerodrome	Páez, Apure	07°19′28″N 069°40′32″W	
SVRB		Puerto Cumarebo Aerodrome	Puerto Cumarebo, Falcón	11°30′45″N 069°18′53″W	
SVRD		El Remanso del Cinaruco Aerodrome	Pedro Camejo, Apure	06°34′03″N 067°25′27″W	
SVRG		Rio de Agua Aerodrome	Libertador, Sucre	10°34′28″N 062°59′05″W	
SVRL		Roblecito Aerodrome	Chaguaramas, Guárico	09°12′14″N 066°18′21″W	
SVRS	LRV	Los Roques Airport	Los Roques Dependencias Federales (Venezuela)	11°56′45″N 066°40′15″W	
SVRU		Santa Rosa de Guanare Aerodrome	San Genaro de Boconoíto, Portuguesa	08°44′56″N 069°43′20″W	
SVSA	SVZ	Juan Vicente Gómez International Airport	San Antonio del Táchira, Táchira	07°50′27″N 072°26′24″W	
SVSB	SBB	Santa Bárbara de Barinas Airport	Santa Bárbara, Barinas	07°48′10″N 071°09′50″W	
SVSC		Hato Santa Ana Aerodrome	San Jerónimo de Guayabal, Guárico	08°02′52″N 067°14′48″W	Road airstrip
SVSE	SNV	Santa Elena de Uairén Airport	Bolívar	04°33′15″N 061°08′35″W	
SVSF		Hato Santa Bárbara Aerodrome	Las Mercedes, Guárico	08°34′10″N 066°19′15″W	
SVSK		San Francisco de Mérida Aerodrome	Francisco Javier Pulgar, Zulia	08°48′22″N 071°35′25″W	
SVSM		Punta de Mata Airport	Punta de Mata, Monagas	09°42′08″N 063°37′31″W	
SVSN		Sabaneta Airport	Sabaneta, Barinas	08°44′39″N 069°54′49″W	
SVSO	STD	Mayor Buenaventura Vivas Airport	Santo Domingo	07°33′55″N 072°02′10″W	
SVSP	SNF	Sub Teniente Nestor Arias Airport	San-Felipe, Yaracuy	10°16′45″N 068°45′20″W	
SVSR	SFD	Las Flecheras Airport	San Fernando de Apure, Apure	07°53′00″N 067°26′40″W	
SVSS		San Silvestre Aerodrome	Barinas, Barinas	08°18′47″N 070°03′47″W	
SVST	SOM	San Tomé Airport	San Tomé, Anzoátegui	08°56′45″N 064°09′00″W	
SVSU		San Diego de Cabrutica Aerodrome	José Gregorio Monagas, Anzoátegui	08°24′16″N 065°00′56″W	
SVSZ	STB	Miguel Urdaneta Fernández Airport	Santa Bárbara del Zulia	08°58′35″N 071°56′35″W	
SVTC	TUV	San Rafael Airport	Tucupita, Delta Amacuro	09°05′20″N 062°05′40″W	
SVTD		Hato Santa Rosa Aerodrome	Camaguán, Guárico	08°16′19″N 067°36′47″W	
SVTG		Turagua Aerodrome	Muñoz, Apure	07°47′45″N 069°19′58″W	
SVTH		La Trinidad de Arichuna Airport	Rómulo Gallegos, Apure	07°06′30″N 069°47′21″W	
SVTM	TMO	Tumeremo Airport	Tumeremo, Bolívar	07°15′00″N 061°31′35″W	
SVTN		Turén Aerodrome	Turén, Portuguesa	09°16′14″N 069°06′48″W	
SVTO		Tocomita Airport	Angostura, Bolívar	07°45′27″N 063°04′57″W	
SVTR		Temblador Airport	Temblador, Monagas	08°59′43″N 062°44′37″W	Closed
SVTT		Mastranto Airport	Tinaco, Cojedes	09°13′51″N 068°22′33″W	
SVTU		Tucupido Aerodrome	José Félix Ribas, Guárico	09°16′31″N 065°45′28″W	
SVTV		Tarragona Aerodrome	Cedeño, Monagas	09°40′52″N 063°52′48″W	
SVTW		Toromacho Aerodrome	Las Mercedes, Guárico	09°07′51″N 066°23′13″W	
SVUC		Cordereño Aerodrome	Páez, Barinas	07°54′13″N 069°55′23″W	
SVUE		San Juan de Manapiare Aerodrome	San Juan de Manapiare, Amazonas	05°18′46″N 066°02′59″W	
SVUM	URM	Uriman Airport	Uriman, Bolívar	05°21′30″N 062°40′20″W	
SVUP		Upata Airport	Piar, Bolívar	07°58′44″N 062°19′43″W	
SVUQ		Uonquén Airport	Uonquén, Bolivar	04°59′00″N 061°43′45″W	
SVUR		Cuenca de Unare Aerodrome	Sir Arthur McGregor, Anzoátegui	09°21′01″N 065°16′50″W	
SVUY		Uruyén Aerodrome	Gran Sabana, Bolívar	05°40′50″N 062°27′27″W	
SVVA	VLN	Arturo Michelena International Airport	Valencia, Carabobo	04°59′00″N 061°43′45″W	
SVVB		La Bendición Ramera Aerodrome	Achaguas, Apure	07°29′00″N 068°54′05″W	
SVVE		Venepal Aerodrome	Venepal, Carabobo	10°32′36″N 068°14′32″W	
SVVG	VIG	Juan Pablo Pérez Alfonzo Airport	El Vigia, Mérida	08°37′25″N 071°40′25″W	
SVVH		Valle Hondo Aerodrome	Maturín, Monagas	09°25′16″N 062°52′49″W	
SVVL	VLV	Dr. Antonio Nicolás Briceño Airport	Valera, Trujillo	09°20′27″N 070°35′03″W	
SVVN		Venelac Aerodrome	Torres, Lara	10°14′33″N 070°30′06″W	
SVVP	VDP	Valle de la Pascua Airport	Valle de la Pascua, Guárico	09°13′20″N 065°59′35″W	
SVWA		Cemento Andino Aerodrome	Silos de Monay, Trujillo	09°37′06″N 070°25′48″W	
SVWC		Chinazón Aerodrome	Monte Carmelo, Trujillo	09°19′34″N 070°55′52″W	
SVWD		CODSA Aerodrome	Gran Sabana, Bolívar	04°46′51″N 061°07′33″W	
SVWG		Churuguara Aerodrome	Churuguara, Falcón	10°48′27″N 069°38′19″W	
SVWQ		El Pardillero Aerodrome	Rojas, Barinas	08°35′51″N 069°45′37″W	
SVWS		El Pinal Aerodrome	Achaguas, Apure	07°21′48″N 068°41′52″W	
SVWV		Corral Viejo Aerodrome	Baralt, Zulia	09°40′06″N 070°58′10″W	
SVWX		El Recreo Aerodrome	Francisco de Miranda, Guárico	09°02′27″N 067°36′11″W	
SVXB		Hato El Burro Aerodrome	Angostura, Bolívar	07°07′44″N 063°27′42″W	
SVXE		Hato El Rosero Aerodrome	Muñoz, Apure	07°34′25″N 069°32′03″W	Road airstrip
SVXI		Hato Los Caballos Aerodrome	El Pao, Cojedes	09°16′33″N 068°10′28″W	
SVXK		El Milagro Aerodrome	Miranda, Carabobo	10°09′10″N 068°22′20″W	
SVXN		Hato Los Corralitos Aerodrome	El Pao, Cojedes	09°00′11″N 068°02′26″W	
SVXS		Hato El Sesenta Aerodrome	El Socorro, Guárico	08°14′44″N 065°33′18″W	
SVXU		La Guacamaya Aerodrome	Guanarita, Portuguesa	08°34′39″N 069°05′35″W	
SVXY		Hato Las Yeguas Aerodrome	Girardot, Cojedes	08°43′53″N 068°28′07″W	
SVYA		Yaure Aerodrome	Ezequiel Zamora, Barinas	07°42′47″N 071°13′40″W	
SVYG		Hoya Grande Aerodrome	Francisco Javier Pulgar, Zulia	08°55′07″N 071°38′26″W	
SVYP		Mapire Airport	José Gregorio Monagas, Anzoátegui	07°44′20″N 064°43′08″W	
SVZA		Santa Bárbara de Amazonas Aerodrome	Atabapo, Amazonas	03°57′13″N 067°05′52″W	

== SW - Brazil ==
ICAO	IATA	Airport name	Community	Coordinates	Notes
SWAA		Ykaraí Farm Aerodrome	Nova Crixás, Goiás	14°32′41″S 050°35′32″W	
SWAB		Bradesco Previdência Heliport	Barueri, São Paulo	23°29′12″S 046°51′24″W	
SWAD		Santa Adelaide Farm Aerodrome	Bom Jesus de Goiás, Goiás	18°15′41″S 049°35′50″W	
SWAE		Uaicas Aerodrome	Alto Alegre, Roraima	03°32′42″N 063°10′56″W	
SWAF		Água Fria Farm Heliport	Esmeraldas, Minas Gerais	19°48′15″S 044°19′30″W	
SWAG		Agrícola Rio Galhão Aerodrome	Mateiros, Tocantins	10°25′29″S 046°04′37″W	
SWAH		Eco Aviação Heliport	Belo Horizonte, Minas Gerais	19°50′32″S 043°52′24″W	
SWAI		Santa Luzia Farm Aerodrome	Icaraíma, Paraná	23°21′00″S 053°29′59″W	
SWAJ		Viatec Aviação Agrícola Aerodrome	Santa Vitória do Palmar, Rio Grande do Sul	33°13′00″S 053°16′01″W	
SWAK		Assunção do Içana Aerodrome	São Gabriel da Cachoeira, Amazonas	01°03′59″N 067°36′02″W	
SWAL		Santa Albana Farm Aerodrome	Itapetininga, São Paulo	23°34′53″S 048°16′54″W	
SWAM		Agropecuária Gomes Farm Aerodrome	Taquarituba, São Paulo	23°38′53″S 049°09′01″W	
SWAN		Jamaica Farm Aerodrome	Pompéia, São Paulo	22°11′04″S 050°16′31″W	
SWAO		Anamoim Aerodrome	São Gabriel da Cachoeira, Amazonas	01°47′59″N 067°23′02″W	
SWAP		Sementes Petrovina Aerodrome	Pedra Preta, Mato Grosso	16°50′55″S 054°03′52″W	
SWAQ		Érico Aerodrome	Amajari, Roraima	03°45′48″N 062°24′34″W	
SWAR		Aruanã Farm Aerodrome	Ribeirão Cascalheira, Mato Grosso	13°04′52″S 051°35′16″W	
SWAS		Usina Açucareira Santo Antônio Aerodrome	Sertãozinho, São Paulo	21°07′16″S 047°56′52″W	
SWAT		Tauana Heliport	Prado, Bahia	16°57′27″S 039°09′40″W	
SWAU		Nossa Senhora Aparecida Farm Aerodrome	Pirajuba, Minas Gerais	19°56′47″S 048°34′44″W	
SWAV		Vale dos Sonhos Farm Aerodrome	Palestina de Goiás, Goiás	16°47′14″S 051°26′33″W	
SWAW		Tropical Heliport	Nova Serrana, Minas Gerais	19°52′26″S 045°00′12″W	
SWAX		Sassapão II Farm Aerodrome	Formosa do Rio Preto, Bahia	10°44′56″S 045°50′43″W	
SWAY		Piripiri Aerodrome	Piripiri, Piauí	04°20′07″S 041°46′08″W	
SWAZ		Santo Atanázio Aerodrome	São Gabriel da Cachoeira, Amazonas	00°23′59″N 069°18′02″W	
SWBA		Buriti Alegre Airport	Buriti Alegre, Goiás	18°07′32″S 049°02′34″W	Closed
SWBB		Castelli Sobradinho Farm Aerodrome	Correntina, Bahia	13°37′13″S 046°05′50″W	
SWBC	BAZ	Barcelos Airport	Barcelos, Amazonas	00°58′52″S 062°55′10″W	
SWBD		New World Farm Aerodrome	Sonora, Mato Grosso do Sul	17°56′24″S 054°55′47″W	
SWBE	JSB	São Benedito Airport	São Benedito, Ceará	04°02′34″S 040°53′38″W	
SWBF		Boa Fortuna Farm Aerodrome	Pium, Tocantins	10°00′18″S 049°29′20″W	
SWBG	LCB	Pontes e Lacerda Airport	Pontes e Lacerda, Mato Grosso	15°11′36″S 059°23′07″W	
SWBH		São José do Rancho Grande Farm Aerodrome	Aquidauana, Mato Grosso do Sul	20°09′22″S 055°32′44″W	
SWBI		Santa Colomba Cafés Aerodrome	Cocos, Bahia	14°37′24″S 045°15′05″W	
SWBJ		Itarema Farm Aerodrome	Canarana, Mato Grosso	13°15′18″S 052°02′24″W	
SWBK		Paladino Farm Aerodrome	São Desidério, Bahia	13°05′22″S 045°49′53″W	
SWBL		Marinas Portobello Heliport	Capitólio, Minas Gerais	20°37′47″S 046°00′22″W	
SWBM		Bauminas Heliport	Cataguases, Minas Gerais	21°22′32″S 042°43′57″W	
SWBN		São Gabriel Farm Aerodrome	Balsas, Maranhão	07°29′24″S 046°08′45″W	
SWBO		Perobal Farm Aerodrome	Corumbiara, Rondônia	12°54′35″S 061°22′14″W	
SWBP		Continental Farm Aerodrome	Colômbia, São Paulo	20°14′28″S 048°39′30″W	
SWBQ		Geraldo Alvino Covre Aerodrome	Pinheiros, Espírito Santo	18°27′48″S 040°10′33″W	
SWBR	RBB	Borba Airport	Borba, Amazonas	04°24′22″S 059°36′09″W	
SWBS		Rolim de Moura Aerodrome	Rolim de Moura, Rondônia	11°39′27″S 061°46′34″W	
SWBT		Tupi Farm Aerodrome	Nova Andradina, Mato Grosso do Sul	21°48′19″S 053°07′43″W	
SWBU		Ouro Branco Heliport	Indiara, Goiás	17°07′31″S 049°57′56″W	
SWBV		Auaris Aerodrome	Amajari, Roraima	04°00′10″N 064°29′44″W	
SWBW		Água Nascente Farm Aerodrome	Sonora, Mato Grosso do Sul	17°14′08″S 053°43′46″W	
SWBX		Santo Antônio do Paraíso Farm Aerodrome	Itiquira, Mato Grosso	17°29′30″S 055°13′17″W	
SWBY		Bela Vista Farm Aerodrome	Indiara, Goiás	17°09′13″S 050°00′52″W	
SWBZ		Projeto Brasil I Aerodrome	Santa Rita de Cássia, Bahia	11°24′29″S 044°40′06″W	
SWCA	CAF	Carauari Airport	Carauari, Amazonas	04°52′17″S 066°53′51″W	
SWCB		Campos Belos Airport	Campos Belos, Goiás	13°00′25″S 046°42′39″W	
SWCC		Candote Aerodrome	Três Lagoas, Mato Grosso do Sul	20°50′20″S 052°18′06″W	
SWCD		Colíder Aerodrome	Colíder, Mato Grosso	10°45′40″S 055°27′44″W	
SWCE		Centúria Austrália Farm Aerodrome	Formosa do Rio Preto, Bahia	11°21′08″S 046°09′41″W	
SWCF		Califórnia Farm Aerodrome	São Félix do Xingu, Pará	09°44′15″S 051°29′50″W	
SWCG		T&T Heliport	Blumenau, Santa Catarina	26°53′16″S 049°05′14″W	
SWCH		Santa Efigênia Farm Aerodrome	Jaborandi, Bahia	14°29′46″S 045°55′20″W	
SWCI		Agropecuária Rio da Prata Aerodrome	Posse, Goiás	14°13′30″S 046°32′54″W	
SWCJ		Campo Alegre Farm Aerodrome	Palmeira do Piauí, Piauí	08°35′28″S 044°14′54″W	
SWCK		West Corp Heliport	Barueri, São Paulo	23°30′06″S 046°51′04″W	
SWCL		Clube CEU Heliport	Rio de Janeiro, Rio de Janeiro	22°58′40″S 043°23′25″W	
SWCM		Marcio Cunha Hospital Heliport	Ipatinga, Minas Gerais	19°29′50″S 042°32′22″W	
SWCN		Nautical Science Institute Heliport	Maricá, Rio de Janeiro	22°56′04″S 042°56′55″W	
SWCO		Continental Farm Aerodrome	Cocalinho, Mato Grosso	14°42′56″S 051°12′35″W	
SWCP		Pontal Aerodrome	Pontal, São Paulo	21°01′58″S 048°00′42″W	
SWCQ		Costa Marques Airport	Costa Marques, Rondônia	12°25′14″S 064°15′06″W	
SWCR		Canaã Farm Aerodrome	Formosa do Rio Preto, Bahia	10°21′09″S 045°33′53″W	
SWCS		Corticeiras Aerodrome	Cristal, Rio Grande do Sul	30°58′43″S 051°56′14″W	
SWCT		Laguna Iguaçu Heliport	Curitiba, Paraná	25°26′57″S 049°17′20″W	
SWCU		Curuá Farm Aerodrome	Altamira, Pará	08°00′15″S 054°56′08″W	
SWCV		CMA Heliport	Barretos, São Paulo	20°34′11″S 048°41′36″W	
SWCW		Ycambi Ranch Heliport	Caratinga, Minas Gerais	19°43′05″S 042°07′55″W	
SWCX		Icon Realty Cajamar Heliport	Cajamar, São Paulo	23°22′34″S 046°50′34″W	
SWCY		Comary Heliport	Teresópolis, Rio de Janeiro	22°27′06″S 042°58′48″W	
SWCZ		Ceres Airport	Ceres, Goiás	15°20′38″S 049°36′16″W	
SWDA		Bahia Administrative Centre Heliport	Salvador, Bahia	12°56′51″S 038°25′55″W	
SWDB		Barro Preto Farm Aerodrome	Corumbá, Mato Grosso do Sul	19°49′07″S 057°12′22″W	
SWDC		Fazenda do Coronel Aerodrome	Coração de Maria, Bahia	12°16′17″S 038°45′07″W	
SWDD		Colibri Farm Aerodrome	Santo Antônio do Leverger, Mato Grosso	16°12′15″S 055°23′54″W	
SWDE		Dom Pedro Park Heliport	Campinas, São Paulo	22°50′42″S 047°03′58″W	
SWDF		Águas Claras Official Residence II Heliport	Brasília, Federal District	15°49′39″S 048°01′23″W	
SWDG		São José Farm Aerodrome	Reginópolis, São Paulo	21°44′40″S 049°09′53″W	
SWDH		Damha Golfe Heliport	São Carlos, São Paulo	21°57′04″S 047°53′53″W	
SWDI		Aeroagrícola Solo Aerodrome	Paranapanema, São Paulo	23°26′50″S 048°51′59″W	
SWDJ		Trend Tower Heliport	Barueri, São Paulo	23°29′08″S 046°51′19″W	
SWDK		Thobias Landim Heliport	Guaíra, São Paulo	20°19′36″S 048°18′09″W	Closed
SWDL		Del Rey Heliport	Salvador, Bahia	12°59′34″S 038°26′24″W	
SWDM		Diamantino Airport	Diamantino, Mato Grosso	14°22′36″S 056°24′02″W	
SWDN		Dianópolis Airport	Dianópolis, Tocantins	11°35′43″S 046°50′52″W	
SWDO		Dona Carolina Farm Hotel Heliport	Itatiba, São Paulo	22°56′28″S 046°42′03″W	
SWDP		Haras da Mata Heliport	Cesário Lange, São Paulo	23°10′30″S 047°55′27″W	
SWDQ		Baia Grande Farm Aerodrome	Rio Verde de Mato Grosso, Mato Grosso do Sul	18°49′44″S 055°12′24″W	
SWDR		Bandeirantes Farm Aerodrome	Taquarussu, Mato Grosso do Sul	22°36′32″S 053°26′50″W	
SWDS		Santos Dumont Air Rights Condominium Aerodrome	Ji-Paraná, Rondônia	10°57′14″S 061°59′36″W	
SWDT		Dezoito Aerodrome	Nerópolis, Goiás	16°26′20″S 049°11′58″W	
SWDU		Destilaria Tabu Aerodrome	Caaporã, Paraíba	07°28′14″S 034°53′22″W	
SWDV		Vereda Farm Heliport	Esmeraldas, Minas Gerais	19°41′13″S 044°26′02″W	
SWDW		Pessegueiro Farm Aerodrome	Passo Fundo, Rio Grande do Sul	28°20′13″S 052°29′09″W	
SWDX		Almirante Tower Building Heliport	Rio de Janeiro, Rio de Janeiro	22°54′27″S 043°10′32″W	
SWDY		Água Fria Farm Aerodrome	Crixás, Goiás	14°45′16″S 050°22′39″W	
SWDZ		Zé Heliport	Ribeirão Preto, São Paulo	21°13′48″S 047°47′03″W	
SWEA		Santiago de Compostela Farm Aerodrome	Comodoro, Mato Grosso	13°27′04″S 060°16′13″W	
SWEB		Bahia Gliding Aerodrome	Formosa do Rio Preto, Bahia	11°15′40″S 045°41′57″W	
SWEC		Araguaia Estate Aerodrome	Aragarças, Goiás	15°53′54″S 052°05′45″W	
SWED		Eldorado Farm Aerodrome	Arapoema, Tocantins	07°45′31″S 049°07′40″W	
SWEE		Estirão do Equador Air Base	Atalaia do Norte, Amazonas	04°31′24″S 071°33′38″W	
SWEF		Europa Farm Aerodrome	Cocalinho, Mato Grosso	14°48′47″S 051°09′24″W	
SWEG		Engevix Heliport	Barueri, São Paulo	23°30′09″S 046°49′40″W	
SWEH		Agroplan Farm Aerodrome	Querência, Mato Grosso	11°39′52″S 052°51′35″W	
SWEI	ERN	Eirunepé Airport	Eirunepé, Amazonas	06°38′15″S 069°52′47″W	
SWEJ		Tocantins Aviation Association Aerodrome	Porto Nacional, Tocantins	10°10′58″S 048°32′47″W	
SWEK	CQA	Canarana Airport	Canarana, Mato Grosso	13°34′39″S 052°16′05″W	
SWEL		Limão Heliport	São Paulo, São Paulo	23°30′20″S 046°40′50″W	
SWEM		Empresa de Mineração Aripuanã Aerodrome	Primavera do Leste, Mato Grosso	14°37′22″S 054°00′16″W	
SWEN		Recanto Estate Aerodrome	Alta Floresta, Mato Grosso	09°56′15″S 056°05′14″W	
SWEO		Itapará Sport Fishing Aerodrome	Rorainópolis, Roraima	00°12′32″N 061°32′43″W	
SWEP		Punta Del Este Estate Aerodrome	Sertaneja, Paraná	22°48′16″S 050°58′58″W	
SWEQ		Pará Aviation and Marine Sporting Club	Belém, Pará	01°16′02″S 048°25′48″W	
SWER		Entre Rios Farm Aerodrome	Porto Murtinho, Mato Grosso do Sul	21°21′31″S 057°06′05″W	
SWES		Parana Experimental Aviation Club Aerodrome	Ibiporã, Paraná	23°17′14″S 051°05′26″W	
SWET		KKS-37 Heliport	Nova Iguaçu, Rio de Janeiro	22°44′20″S 043°29′37″W	
SWEU		Americana Farm Aerodrome	Itambacuri, Minas Gerais	18°08′49″S 041°42′52″W	
SWEV		Cambara 1 Farm Aerodrome	Correntina, Bahia	13°36′17″S 046°03′08″W	
SWEW		Felicidade Farm Aerodrome	Porto Esperidião, Mato Grosso	15°50′26″S 058°38′07″W	
SWEX		Boa Esperança Aerodrome	Santa Luzia, Maranhão	03°54′43″S 045°46′59″W	
SWEY		São Fernando Farm Heliport	Vassouras, Rio de Janeiro	22°20′45″S 043°32′02″W	
SWEZ		Estivado Farm Aerodrome	Diamantino, Mato Grosso	14°25′23″S 056°04′19″W	
SWFA		Pamplona Farm Aerodrome	Cristalina, Goiás	16°12′57″S 047°37′35″W	
SWFB		Bergamini Farms Heliport	Riversul, São Paulo	23°47′14″S 049°25′27″W	
SWFC		Cedro Farm Aerodrome	Lucas do Rio Verde, Mato Grosso	12°58′35″S 056°11′01″W	
SWFD		Don Felipe Farm Aerodrome	Ponta Porã, Mato Grosso do Sul	22°33′33″S 055°22′52″W	
SWFE		São Félix Farm Aerodrome	Machadinho d'Oeste, Rondônia	09°17′34″S 061°48′24″W	
SWFF		Franciosi Farm Aerodrome	Sapezal, Mato Grosso	13°25′08″S 058°28′22″W	
SWFG		Guanabara Farm Aerodrome	Nova Alvorada do Sul, Mato Grosso do Sul	21°07′16″S 054°26′48″W	
SWFH		Fly Club Aerodrome	Porto Seguro, Bahia	16°21′30″S 039°00′54″W	
SWFI		Santa Paula Farm Aerodrome	Cáceres, Mato Grosso	15°38′35″S 057°32′53″W	
SWFJ	FEJ	Alcimar Leitão Airport	Feijó, Acre	08°09′56″S 070°21′11″W	Closed
SWFK		Kurupay Farm Aerodrome	Angélica, Mato Grosso do Sul	22°02′09″S 053°44′11″W	
SWFL		Peixe Bravo Farm	Santa Terezinha, Mato Grosso	10°05′38″S 050°22′58″W	
SWFM		Maiador Farm Aerodrome	Goiandira, Goiás	18°10′28″S 048°12′39″W	
SWFN		Flores Airport	Manaus, Amazonas	03°04′22″S 060°01′16″W	
SWFO		Santa Maria Farm Aerodrome	Formosa do Rio Preto, Bahia	10°57′58″S 046°16′05″W	
SWFP		Prata Farm Aerodrome	Rurópolis, Pará	04°09′38″S 055°22′55″W	
SWFQ		Alvorada Farm Aerodrome	Porto Nacional, Tocantins	10°23′31″S 048°40′45″W	
SWFR		Formosa Airport	Formosa, Goiás	15°33′22″S 047°20′41″W	
SWFS		São Francisco Farm Heliport	Mogi Mirim, São Paulo	22°22′58″S 047°00′32″W	
SWFT		Office Tower Heliport	São Luís, Maranhão	02°30′05″S 044°17′27″W	
SWFU		Fortuna Aerodrome	Vila Bela da Santíssima Trindade, Mato Grosso	16°10′01″S 059°30′02″W	
SWFV		Terramare Aerodrome	Guapé, Minas Gerais	20°43′21″S 045°51′52″W	
SWFW		Terra Way VII Farm Aerodrome	Tabaporã, Mato Grosso	11°32′50″S 056°01′36″W	
SWFX	SXO	São Félix do Araguaia Airport	São Félix do Araguaia, Mato Grosso	11°37′57″S 050°41′22″W	
SWFY		Fapar Heliport	Caxias do Sul, Rio Grande do Sul	29°10′56″S 051°14′10″W	
SWFZ		Galiléia Farm Aerodrome	Almas, Tocantins	11°33′40″S 047°08′46″W	
SWGA		Avaré Dam Heliport	Avaré, São Paulo	23°12′07″S 048°59′05″W	
SWGB		Gabinete Militar Heliport	Goiânia, Goiás	16°40′55″S 049°15′22″W	
SWGC		Ponta Porã Agricentre Aerodrome	Ponta Porã, Mato Grosso do Sul	22°37′26″S 055°34′08″W	
SWGD		Estrela Farm Aerodrome	Baixa Grande do Ribeiro, Piauí	08°28′20″S 045°19′47″W	
SWGE		Green Technology Heliport	Campo Largo, Paraná	25°26′08″S 049°25′33″W	
SWGF		Fortaleza Farm Aerodrome	Novo Aripuanã, Amazonas	07°54′28″S 061°15′00″W	
SWGG		Guanabara Farm Aerodrome	Nova Olímpia, Mato Grosso	14°46′01″S 057°16′02″W	Closed
SWGH		Corporate Plaza Business Centre Heliport	Fortaleza, Ceará	03°44′06″S 038°30′11″W	
SWGI	GRP	Gurupi Airport	Gurupi, Tocantins	11°44′22″S 049°08′00″W	
SWGJ		Campo Grande Farm Aerodrome	Baianópolis, Bahia	12°42′44″S 044°35′26″W	
SWGK		André Guimarães Heliport	Lauro de Freitas, Bahia	12°52′31″S 038°18′31″W	
SWGL		Vargas Aerodrome	Getúlio Vargas, Rio Grande do Sul	27°51′45″S 052°11′05″W	
SWGM		Panco Guararema Heliport	Guararema, São Paulo	23°20′13″S 046°08′37″W	
SWGN	AUX	Araguaína Airport	Araguaína, Tocantins	07°13′42″S 048°14′27″W	
SWGO		Santa Cecília Aerodrome	Goianésia, Goiás	15°20′35″S 049°08′09″W	
SWGP		Palmeiras de Goiás Aerodrome	Palmeiras de Goiás, Goiás	16°49′37″S 049°52′46″W	
SWGQ		Monte Alegre Farm Aerodrome	Nova Olímpia, Mato Grosso	14°46′51″S 057°21′15″W	
SWGR		Urbanova Heliport	São José dos Campos, São Paulo	23°11′03″S 045°55′57″W	
SWGS		Branco Ranch Farm Aerodrome	Nova Maringá, Mato Grosso	12°13′42″S 057°14′16″W	
SWGT		Nova Farm Aerodrome	Jandaia, Goiás	17°10′20″S 050°12′31″W	
SWGU		São Gabriel Farm Aerodrome	Brasnorte, Mato Grosso	12°39′22″S 058°14′57″W	
SWGV		Cocal II Farm Aerodrome	Canarana, Mato Grosso	12°48′07″S 052°36′28″W	
SWGW		Santa Rita do Araguaia Farm Aerodrome	Jussara, Goiás	15°26′19″S 051°35′54″W	
SWGX		Fortunas Heliport	Fortuna de Minas, Minas Gerais	19°36′53″S 044°24′49″W	
SWGY		Sierra Móveis Gramado Heliport	Gramado, Rio Grande do Sul	29°25′02″S 050°51′12″W	
SWGZ		Cangaia Farm Aerodrome	Tailândia, Pará	03°00′45″S 048°53′54″W	
SWHA		Das Américas Heliport	Rio de Janeiro, Rio de Janeiro	23°00′30″S 043°27′52″W	
SWHB		Hyundai Piracicaba Heliport	Piracicaba, São Paulo	22°40′58″S 047°36′10″W	
SWHC		Caracol Heliport	Canela, Rio Grande do Sul	29°19′02″S 050°51′07″W	
SWHD		Ipuitã Farm Aerodrome	Naviraí, Mato Grosso do Sul	23°01′19″S 053°54′04″W	
SWHE		Santa Helena Heliport	Votorantim, São Paulo	23°35′53″S 047°26′28″W	
SWHF		Chaparral Farm Aerodrome	Correntina, Bahia	13°28′24″S 045°22′18″W	
SWHG		Santa Helena de Goiás Airport	Santa Helena de Goiás, Goiás	17°49′36″S 050°35′22″W	
SWHJ		Banco Santander Heliport	São Paulo	23°35′27″S 046°41′27″W	
SWHI		Gold Meat Heliport	Cajuru, São Paulo	21°15′54″S 047°18′42″W	
SWHJ		Santa Lúcia Farm Aerodrome	Brasiléia, Acre	10°44′47″S 069°11′56″W	
SWHK		Hbuster Heliport	Cotia, São Paulo	23°37′08″S 046°53′06″W	
SWHL		Marabá Farm Aerodrome	Campo Verde, Mato Grosso	15°16′27″S 055°07′16″W	
SWHM		Lobo Agropecuária Aerodrome	Alcinópolis, Mato Grosso do Sul	18°18′45″S 053°39′46″W	
SWHN		Colibri Farm Aerodrome	Selvíria, Mato Grosso do Sul	20°13′37″S 051°50′45″W	
SWHO		Novo Horizonte Farm	Capitão Enéas, Minas Gerais	16°10′46″S 043°36′34″W	
SWHP	GGB	Água Boa Airport	Água Boa, Mato Grosso	14°01′11″S 052°09′07″W	
SWHQ		Santa Cruz Farm Aerodrome	Vila Bela da Santíssima Trindade, Mato Grosso	15°11′07″S 059°56′05″W	
SWHR		Rio Paraná Estate Aerodrome	Presidente Epitácio, São Paulo	21°51′25″S 052°11′10″W	
SWHS		São João Farm Aerodrome	Maurilândia, Goiás	18°03′01″S 050°22′51″W	
SWHT	HUW	Francisco Correa da Cruz Airport	Humaitá, Amazonas	07°32′55″S 063°04′20″W	
SWHU		Izaura Farm–Usina Cocal Aerodrome	Rancharia, São Paulo	22°30′24″S 050°51′55″W	
SWHV		Construtora G e F Heliport	Fortaleza, Ceará	03°49′16″S 038°32′02″W	
SWHW		Helbor Tower Heliport	Mogi das Cruzes, São Paulo	23°31′25″S 046°11′47″W	
SWHX		Mandaqui Hospital Complex Heliport	São Paulo, São Paulo	23°29′06″S 046°37′50″W	
SWHY		Irerê Farm Aerodrome	Maracaju, Mato Grosso do Sul	21°29′40″S 055°15′58″W	
SWHZ		Taquaruçu Retiro Farm Aerodrome	Carlinda, Mato Grosso	10°20′15″S 055°57′34″W	
SWIA		Antônio Costa da Silva Aerodrome	Juruá, Amazonas	03°28′56″S 066°03′27″W	
SWIB		Santa Laura Farm Aerodrome	Nova Santa Helena, Mato Grosso	10°51′46″S 054°54′51″W	
SWIC		Alegre Ranch Farm Aerodrome	Nova Mutum, Mato Grosso	13°31′11″S 056°04′00″W	
SWID		Itáu Data Centre Heliport	Mogi Mirim, São Paulo	22°29′27″S 046°58′28″W	
SWIE		Planalto das Emas Farm Aerodrome	Jaborandi, Bahia	14°05′54″S 046°08′29″W	
SWIF		Rio Santos Heliport	Itaguaí, Rio de Janeiro	22°51′17″S 043°45′53″W	
SWIG		Igarashi 3 Heliport	Planaltina, Goiás	15°10′53″S 047°35′31″W	
SWIH		Felicidade Farm Aerodrome	Novo São Joaquim, Mato Grosso	14°54′06″S 052°44′05″W	
SWII	IPG	Ipiranga Airport	Santo Antônio do Içá, Amazonas	02°56′25″S 069°41′39″W	
SWIJ		Água Doce Farm Aerodrome	Jaborandi, Bahia	14°03′03″S 045°35′36″W	
SWIK		Vanguarda Farm Aerodrome	Cocalinho, Mato Grosso	14°55′02″S 051°17′02″W	
SWIL		Tarumã Farm Aerodrome	Pedra Preta, Mato Grosso	17°00′57″S 054°20′59″W	
SWIM		Três Ranchos Farm Aerodrome	Montes Claros de Goiás, Goiás	16°07′16″S 051°40′15″W	
SWIN		Itamarati Norte Farm Aerodrome	Campo Novo do Parecis, Mato Grosso	14°14′35″S 057°59′43″W	
SWIO		CEO Heliport	Rio de Janeiro, Rio de Janeiro	22°59′06″S 043°21′32″W	
SWIP		Três Rios Farm Aerodrome	Unaí, Minas Gerais	16°56′41″S 046°16′25″W	
SWIQ	MQH	Minaçu Airport	Minaçu, Goiás	13°32′57″S 048°11′44″W	
SWIR		CCN North Tower Heliport	Rio de Janeiro, Rio de Janeiro	22°54′41″S 043°12′30″W	
SWIS		Caiapó Aerodrome	Caseara, Tocantins	09°11′11″S 049°46′31″W	
SWIT		Itaipu Flying Condominium Aerodrome	Santa Terezinha de Itaipu, Paraná	25°29′04″S 054°26′29″W	
SWIU		Madeirinha Aerodrome	Colniza, Mato Grosso	09°50′51″S 061°25′03″W	
SWIV		Águia Branca do Parú Aerodrome	Almeirim, Pará	01°16′05″S 053°15′41″W	
SWIW		Pirapitinga Farm Aerodrome	Cocalzinho de Goiás, Goiás	15°25′03″S 048°38′05″W	
SWIX		JPO Aerodrome	Sorriso, Mato Grosso	12°36′21″S 055°45′57″W	
SWIY	IDO	Santa Isabel do Morro Airport	Lagoa da Confusão, Tocantins	11°34′24″S 050°40′06″W	Formerly SBSY
SWIZ		Sete Reis Farm Aerodrome	Nova Alvorada do Sul, Mato Grosso do Sul	21°17′48″S 054°28′45″W	
SWJA		Aero-Amil Farm Aerodrome	Brusque, Santa Catarina	27°01′03″S 048°51′12″W	
SWJB		Jubá Farm Aerodrome	Tangará da Serra, Mato Grosso	14°44′42″S 058°07′42″W	
SWJC		Carandá Farm Aerodrome	Rio Verde de Mato Grosso, Mato Grosso do Sul	19°03′05″S 055°05′52″W	
SWJD		Genipapo Farm Aerodrome	São Domingos, Goiás	13°27′12″S 046°40′47″W	
SWJE		Solar Volta da Jurema Heliport	Fortaleza, Ceará	03°43′27″S 038°29′22″W	
SWJF		São Francisco Farm Aerodrome	Corumbá, Mato Grosso do Sul	17°38′53″S 056°53′59″W	
SWJG		CGO Heliport	Pilar de Goiás, Goiás	14°46′38″S 049°34′34″W	
SWJH		Sementes Beé Aerodrome	Tapejara, Rio Grande do Sul	28°03′09″S 051°58′06″W	
SWJI		Maringá Farm Aerodrome	Baixa Grande do Ribeiro, Piauí	08°08′43″S 045°12′12″W	
SWJJ		Ilha dos Coqueiros Heliport	Angra dos Reis, Rio de Janeiro	22°59′03″S 044°21′15″W	
SWJK		Hermitage Heliport	Niterói, Rio de Janeiro	22°54′57″S 042°59′30″W	
SWJL		Invernada Farm Aerodrome	Itajá, Goiás	19°02′13″S 051°15′58″W	
SWJM		Bom Jesus Farm Aerodrome	Campos Belos, Goiás	12°57′04″S 046°33′58″W	
SWJN	JIA	Juína Airport	Juína, Mato Grosso	11°25′10″S 058°42′36″W	
SWJO		São José Farm Aerodrome	Poxoréu, Mato Grosso	15°26′01″S 054°26′27″W	
SWJP		Vila Bittencourt Aerodrome	Japurá, Amazonas	01°24′14″S 069°25′25″W	
SWJQ		São João Farm Aerodrome	Paranhos, Mato Grosso do Sul	23°50′33″S 055°26′10″W	
SWJR		Santa Rita Farm Aerodrome	Aquidauana, Mato Grosso do Sul	19°15′04″S 055°31′12″W	
SWJS		Santa Rosa Pantanal Hotel Aerodrome	Poconé, Mato Grosso	17°21′59″S 056°47′30″W	
SWJT		Toca da Orca Heliport	Santo Antônio de Goiás, Goiás	16°27′51″S 049°13′30″W	
SWJU	JRN	Juruena Airport	Juruena, Mato Grosso	10°18′21″S 058°29′22″W	
SWJV		Palmeiras do Javari Aerodrome	Atalaia do Norte, Amazonas	05°07′37″S 072°48′35″W	
SWJW		Jataí Airport	Jataí, Goiás	17°49′48″S 051°46′31″W	
SWJX		Eldorado Farm Aerodrome	Gaúcha do Norte, Mato Grosso	13°36′12″S 053°32′39″W	
SWJY		Professora Francisca Cardoso Aerodrome	São Miguel de Taipu, Paraíba	07°14′46″S 035°10′21″W	
SWJZ		Sítio Primavera Aerodrome	Itaituba, Pará	06°25′21″S 055°26′48″W	
SWKA		Cachoeira 2 Farm Aerodrome	Buritizeiro, Minas Gerais	17°23′23″S 045°05′38″W	
SWKB		Baía do Lara Farm Aerodrome	Corumbá, Mato Grosso do Sul	17°33′57″S 055°17′18″W	
SWKC	CCX	Cáceres Airport	Cáceres, Mato Grosso	16°02′33″S 057°37′48″W	
SWKD		Portal do Japy Heliport	Cabreúva, São Paulo	23°15′26″S 047°02′28″W	
SWKE		Cobrape Aerodrome	Formoso do Araguaia, Tocantins	11°29′06″S 049°57′16″W	
SWKF		Furnas do Sararé Farm Aerodrome	Vila Bela da Santíssima Trindade, Mato Grosso	15°02′41″S 059°25′18″W	
SWKG		Ilha da Gipóia Heliport	Angra dos Reis, Rio de Janeiro	23°03′00″S 044°20′52″W	
SWKH		Rio Vermelho–Krénhêdjã Village Aerodrome	Ourilândia do Norte, Pará	07°39′40″S 051°37′10″W	
SWKJ		Parklog Heliport	Mogi Mirim, São Paulo	22°32′35″S 046°59′55″W	
SWKK		Huck Heliport	Rio de Janeiro, Rio de Janeiro	23°00′31″S 043°17′17″W	
SWKL		Primavera do Rio Terebinto Farm Aerodrome	Alto Alegre dos Parecis, Rondônia	12°33′31″S 061°59′37″W	
SWKM		Castelo Branco Office Park Tower II Heliport	Barueri, São Paulo	23°30′19″S 046°50′15″W	
SWKN		Caramori Aerodrome	Barra do Bugres, Mato Grosso	14°52′02″S 058°30′24″W	
SWKO	CIZ	Coari Airport	Coari, Amazonas	04°08′03″S 063°07′57″W	
SWKP		Krãnhãmpare Village Aerodrome	São Félix do Xingu, Pará	08°44′00″S 051°50′52″W	
SWKQ	NSR	São Raimundo Nonato Airport	São Raimundo Nonato, Piauí	09°05′00″S 042°38′41″W	
SWKR		Mangue Che II Farm Aerodrome	Itarumã, Goiás	18°40′12″S 051°35′07″W	
SWKS		Fornagieri Heliport	São Carlos do Ivaí, Paraná	23°18′42″S 052°30′40″W	
SWKT	TLZ	Catalão Airport	Catalão, Goiás	18°13′01″S 047°53′58″W	
SWKU		Cucui Aerodrome	São Gabriel da Cachoeira, Amazonas	01°07′14″N 066°50′30″W	
SWKV		Beira Rio Farm Aerodrome	Itaúba, Mato Grosso	10°54′28″S 055°51′45″W	
SWKW		Kawatire Village Aerodrome	São Félix do Xingu, Pará	07°43′10″S 052°45′21″W	
SWKX		Clip-PB Heliport	Conde, Paraíba	07°16′18″S 034°56′02″W	
SWKY		Maravilha Heliport	Camaçari, Bahia	12°48′42″S 038°14′58″W	
SWKZ		Central Park Business Heliport	Fortaleza, Ceará	03°44′50″S 038°29′24″W	
SWLA		Amália Farm Aerodrome	Juína, Mato Grosso	11°52′56″S 058°38′02″W	
SWLB	LBR	Lábrea Airport	Lábrea, Amazonas	07°16′44″S 064°46′10″W	Formerly SBLB
SWLC	RVD	Rio Verde Airport	Rio Verde, Goiás	17°50′05″S 050°57′22″W	
SWLD		Milla Condominium Aerodrome	Baixa Grande do Ribeiro, Piauí	08°15′10″S 045°14′50″W	
SWLE		Empresarial Alfred Nobel Heliport	Recife, Pernambuco	08°03′53″S 034°53′46″W	
SWLF		Campo Florido Branch Aerodrome	Campo Florido, Minas Gerais	19°48′53″S 048°44′20″W	
SWLG		Palácio Laranjeiras Heliport	Rio de Janeiro, Rio de Janeiro	22°55′51″S 043°11′07″W	
SWLH		Nova Holanda Farm Aerodrome	Balsas, Maranhão	08°48′24″S 046°21′31″W	
SWLI		Santa Maria da Nhecolândia Farm Aerodrome	Corumbá, Mato Grosso do Sul	18°49′00″S 056°34′46″W	
SWLJ		Santa Cruz Farm Aerodrome	Iaciara, Goiás	14°13′06″S 046°50′20″W	
SWLK		Boa Vista Farm–Grupo IJP Aerodrome	Sorriso, Mato Grosso	13°09′03″S 055°22′33″W	
SWLL		Liberdade Farm Aerodrome	Correntina, Bahia	13°37′36″S 045°24′54″W	
SWLM		Mustang II Farm Aerodrome	Candeias do Jamari, Rondônia	09°14′43″S 063°33′24″W	
SWLN		Laranjeiras Farm Aerodrome	Currais, Piauí	08°42′42″S 044°34′17″W	
SWLO		São José Hospital Heliport	Jaraguá do Sul, Santa Catarina	26°29′20″S 049°05′05″W	
SWLP		Rosa Paralelo 10 Farm Aerodrome	Rondolândia, Mato Grosso	09°58′20″S 061°14′00″W	
SWLQ		Mata Velha Farm Aerodrome	Manicoré, Amazonas	07°54′29″S 061°33′48″W	
SWLR		Perdizes Farm Aerodrome	Silvânia, Goiás	16°27′06″S 048°23′53″W	
SWLS		São Luis Farm Aerodrome	Palotina, Paraná	24°11′56″S 053°52′27″W	
SWLT		Loreto Heliport	Salvador, Bahia	12°45′35″S 038°37′14″W	
SWLV		Santo Antônio de Leverger Aerodrome	Santo Antônio de Leverger, Mato Grosso	15°51′04″S 056°05′16″W	
SWLW		Grupo Tático Aéreo Heliport	São Luís, Maranhão	02°29′47″S 044°16′46″W	
SWLX		Analice Farm Aerodrome	Jauru, Mato Grosso	15°24′45″S 058°49′45″W	
SWLY		Chácara MCL Aerodrome	Andradina, São Paulo	20°52′52″S 051°21′23″W	
SWLZ		São Luiz Farm Aerodrome	Paracatu, Minas Gerais	17°27′57″S 047°15′16″W	
SWMA		Córrego do Mato Farm Aerodrome	Camapuã, Mato Grosso do Sul	18°41′42″S 053°34′34″W	
SWMB		Sítio Mombaça Heliport	Angra dos Reis, Rio de Janeiro	23°00′48″S 044°17′17″W	
SWMC		Capão da Cruz Aerodrome	Luís Antônio, São Paulo	21°27′30″S 047°53′16″W	
SWMD		Fazenda da Máquina Aerodrome	Sete Lagoas, Minas Gerais	19°26′24″S 044°18′50″W	
SWME		Mineiros Airport	Mineiros, Goiás	17°33′05″S 052°33′24″W	
SWMF		Higienópolis Medical Centre Heliport	São Paulo, São Paulo	23°33′00″S 046°39′31″W	
SWMG		Margom Aerodrome	Água Fria de Goiás, Goiás	14°52′11″S 047°34′46″W	
SWMH		Bom Pastor Farm Aerodrome	Itapirapuã, Goiás	15°32′12″S 051°01′11″W	
SWMI		Esplanada Farm Aerodrome	Brasilândia, Mato Grosso do Sul	20°52′06″S 052°51′56″W	
SWMJ		Mano Julio Farm Aerodrome	Tapurah, Mato Grosso	12°21′18″S 056°17′49″W	
SWMK		Maturacá Aerodrome	Santa Isabel do Rio Negro, Amazonas	00°37′41″N 066°06′55″W	
SWML		Nova Santa Rita Farm Aerodrome	Itaituba, Pará	06°48′05″S 056°29′27″W	
SWMM		Mabra I Heliport	Nazário, Goiás	16°36′59″S 049°52′58″W	
SWMN		Santa Mônica Aerodrome	Natividade, Tocantins	12°03′56″S 047°43′19″W	
SWMO		Mirandópolis Farm Aerodrome	Juscimeira, Mato Grosso	16°21′43″S 055°05′02″W	
SWMP		Paladino Heliport	Alhandra, Paraíba	07°15′17″S 034°55′43″W	
SWMQ		Muiraquitã Farm Aerodrome	Aripuanã, Mato Grosso	10°25′44″S 060°32′50″W	
SWMR		Retirinho Farm Aerodrome	Aquidauana, Mato Grosso do Sul	19°52′49″S 056°01′31″W	
SWMS		Monte Sinai III Heliport	Ribeirão Preto, São Paulo	21°10′39″S 047°48′03″W	
SWMT		Chácara São Matheus Aerodrome	Japurá, Paraná	23°29′06″S 052°34′21″W	
SWMU		Três Muchachas Farm Aerodrome	Bandeirantes, Mato Grosso do Sul	19°38′34″S 054°01′55″W	
SWMV		Paa-Piu Aerodrome	Iracema, Roraima	02°43′37″N 062°57′02″W	
SWMW	MBZ	Maués Airport	Maués, Amazonas	03°22′19″S 057°43′29″W	
SWMX		Jauquara Farm Aerodrome	Barra do Bugres, Mato Grosso	15°10′26″S 057°07′38″W	
SWMZ		Agroer Agropecuária Aerodrome	Rondonópolis, Mato Grosso	16°26′31″S 054°42′07″W	
SWNA		Novo Aripuanã Aerodrome	Novo Aripuanã, Amazonas	05°07′03″S 060°21′52″W	
SWNB		Luís Eduardo Magalhães Aerodrome	Luís Eduardo Magalhães, Bahia	12°04′06″S 045°42′41″W	
SWNC		Nictheroy Farm Aerodrome	Rio Branco, Acre	10°16′03″S 067°41′53″W	
SWND		Tamboré Heliport	Barueri, São Paulo	23°30′35″S 046°49′33″W	Closed
SWNE		Nelson Saldanha Aerodrome	Nova Viçosa, Bahia	17°53′04″S 039°22′00″W	
SWNF		Franciscus Aerodrome	Divinópolis do Tocantins, Tocantins	09°29′59″S 049°37′45″W	
SWNG		Samarco Mina do Germano Heliport	Mariana, Minas Gerais	20°11′57″S 043°29′23″W	
SWNH		Aruanã Airport	Aruanã, Goiás	14°55′59″S 051°02′54″W	
SWNI		Hospital e Maternidade Santa Marina Heliport	São Paulo, São Paulo	23°39′25″S 046°39′10″W	
SWNJ		Itaquerê Farm Aerodrome	Novo São Joaquim, Mato Grosso	15°08′19″S 053°30′06″W	
SWNK	BCR	Novo Campo Airport	Boca do Acre, Amazonas	08°50′05″S 067°18′45″W	
SWNL		São Sebastião Farm Aerodrome	Ribas do Rio Pardo, Mato Grosso do Sul	20°10′45″S 054°03′06″W	
SWNM		Módulo Aguapei Farm Aerodrome	Porto Esperidião, Mato Grosso	15°49′37″S 059°14′03″W	
SWNN		Jandaira Farm Aerodrome	Tapurah, Mato Grosso	12°46′46″S 056°28′49″W	
SWNO		São Miguel do Tapuio Aerodrome	São Miguel do Tapuio, Piauí	05°29′32″S 041°18′03″W	
SNWP		Novo Paraíso Aerodrome	Caracaraí, Roraima	01°14′17″N 060°29′11″W	
SNWQ		Niquelândia Airport	Niquelândia, Goiás	14°26′11″S 048°29′31″W	
SWNS	APS	Anapolis Airport	Anápolis, Goiás	16°21′45″S 048°55′41″W	
SWNT		Aracagi Farm Aerodrome	Peixoto de Azevedo, Mato Grosso	10°33′43″S 053°28′27″W	
SWNU		Maringá Farm Aerodrome	Ipixuna do Pará, Pará	03°09′43″S 048°06′25″W	
SWNV		Baile Farm Aerodrome	Nova Andradina, Mato Grosso do Sul	22°14′13″S 053°22′19″W	
SWNW		Roso Aerodrome	Aceguá, Rio Grande do Sul	31°44′03″S 054°05′20″W	
SWNX		Tek United Nations Heliport	São Paulo, São Paulo	23°37′01″S 046°42′07″W	
SWNY		Canaã Farm Heliport	Luís Antônio, São Paulo	21°32′04″S 047°41′10″W	
SWNZ		Jamaica Farm Aerodrome	Serra Nova Dourada, Mato Grosso	11°55′36″S 051°36′05″W	
SWOA		Arnapar Aerodrome	Goianira, Goiás	16°32′26″S 049°23′54″W	
SWOB	FBA	Fonte Boa Airport	Fonte Boa, Amazonas	02°32′57″S 066°04′59″W	
SWOC		São Bento do Bocajah Farm Aerodrome	Caracol, Mato Grosso do Sul	22°01′31″S 057°21′53″W	
SWOD		Ondina Heliport	Salvador, Bahia	13°00′33″S 038°30′14″W	
SWOE		Estância do Sol Heliport	Arapongas, Paraná	23°30′30″S 051°25′52″W	
SWOF		Três Fronteiras Farm Aerodrome	Alto Taquari, Mato Grosso	18°02′21″S 053°09′04″W	
SWOG		Itaipu Farm Aerodrome	São José do Rio Claro, Mato Grosso	13°45′51″S 056°57′20″W	
SWOH		Vinícola Don Guerino Heliport	Alto Feliz, Rio Grande do Sul	29°22′46″S 051°19′49″W	
SWOI		Nova Esperança Farm Aerodrome	Cáceres, Mato Grosso	15°52′27″S 057°21′09″W	
SWOJ		Rocas do Vouga Stud Farm Heliport	Itu, São Paulo	23°17′53″S 047°24′10″W	
SWOK		Pontal Farm Aerodrome	Itiquira, Mato Grosso	17°18′20″S 053°56′06″W	
SWOL		Roncador Farm Aerodrome	Barra do Garças, Mato Grosso	15°05′46″S 052°24′00″W	
SWOM		Salto Bello II Farm Aerodrome	Novo São Joaquim, Mato Grosso	14°57′40″S 053°29′17″W	
SWON		Céu Azul Aviation Club Aerodrome	Araquari, Santa Catarina	26°33′41″S 048°41′46″W	
SWOO		San Diego Farm Aerodrome	Campo Verde, Mato Grosso	15°20′47″S 054°40′27″W	
SWOP		APTA Heliport	São Bernardo do Campo, São Paulo	23°46′05″S 046°35′34″W	
SWOQ		Vista Verde Farm Aerodrome	Palmeira do Piauí, Piauí	08°29′30″S 044°23′05″W	
SWOR		Colorado Farm Aerodrome	Britânia, Goiás	15°27′12″S 051°13′29″W	
SWOS		Santa Márcia Farm Aerodrome	Caiapônia, Goiás	16°34′51″S 052°08′33″W	
SWOT		Planorte Farm Aerodrome	Sapezal, Mato Grosso	13°56′41″S 058°53′44″W	
SWOU		Rede Globo 2 Heliport	São Paulo, São Paulo	23°36′54″S 046°41′54″W	
SWOV		Girassol Farm Aerodrome	Pedra Preta, Mato Grosso	16°50′45″S 054°02′47″W	
SWOW		Moura Air Base	Barcelos, Amazonas	01°27′47″S 061°38′03″W	
SWOX		Pixoxó Farm Aerodrome	São Carlos, São Paulo	21°46′48″S 047°52′58″W	
SWOY		Santa Rita I Farm Aerodrome	Pedro Gomes, Mato Grosso do Sul	17°54′02″S 054°39′26″W	
SWOZ		Santo Antônio Farm Aerodrome	Campo Verde, Mato Grosso	15°18′38″S 054°53′57″W	
SWPA		Futura Farm Aerodrome	Nova Ubiratã, Mato Grosso	13°07′19″S 055°04′11″W	
SWPB		Forte Príncipe da Beira Air Base	Costa Marques, Rondônia	12°25′07″S 064°25′08″W	
SWPC		Pari-Cachoeira Aerodrome	São Gabriel da Cachoeira, Amazonas	00°15′57″N 069°47′40″W	
SWPD		Pouso da Águia Aerodrome	Cantá, Roraima	02°47′14″N 060°35′45″W	
SWPE		Lagoa da Mata Farm Aerodrome	Carlinda, Mato Grosso	10°07′53″S 055°35′10″W	
SWPF		Primavera Farm Aerodrome	Pimenteiras do Oeste, Rondônia	13°27′34″S 061°14′02″W	
SWPG	PBV	Porto dos Gaúchos Airport	Porto dos Gaúchos, Mato Grosso	11°32′24″S 057°22′41″W	
SWPH		Paulo Abreu Farm Aerodrome	Barra do Garças, Mato Grosso	15°13′34″S 052°07′48″W	
SWPI	PIN	Julio Belém Airport	Parintins, Amazonas	02°40′25″S 056°46′39″W	
SWPJ		Santo Antônio Farm Heliport	Mogi Mirim, São Paulo	22°27′52″S 046°54′46″W	
SWPK		Poconé Airport	Poconé, Mato Grosso	16°16′18″S 056°39′04″W	
SWPL		Posto Leonardo Vilas Boas	Chapada dos Guimarães, Mato Grosso	12°11′57″S 053°22′59″W	
SWPM	PBQ	Pimenta Bueno Airport	Pimenta Bueno, Rondônia	11°38′29″S 061°10′44″W	
SWPN		Pantanal Fishing Spot Aerodrome	Santo Antônio do Leverger, Mato Grosso	17°19′29″S 055°31′44″W	
SWPO		Pequi Metals Heliport	Pequi, Minas Gerais	19°36′29″S 044°39′19″W	
SWPP		Pica-Pau Farm Aerodrome	Mozarlândia, Goiás	14°44′58″S 050°39′47″W	
SWPQ	PBX	Piraguassu Farm Airport	Porto Alegre do Norte, Mato Grosso	10°51′31″S 051°41′22″W	
SWPR		Pires do Rio Airport	Pires do Rio, Goiás	17°19′08″S 048°20′07″W	
SWPS		Fazenda Das Perobas Aerodrome	Prudente de Morais, Minas Gerais	19°30′08″S 044°09′28″W	
SWPT		Ventura I Aerodrome	São Desidério, Bahia	13°10′39″S 046°13′47″W	
SWPU		Porecatu Aerodrome	Porecatu, Paraná	22°46′30″S 051°21′46″W	
SWPV		Dom Rodrigo El Manco Aerodrome	Piracuruca, Piauí	03°56′31″S 041°40′11″W	
SWPW		CEA–Caçapava Aerodrome	Caçapava, São Paulo	23°07′36″S 045°39′46″W	
SWPX		Belterra Aerodrome	Belterra, Pará	02°40′20″S 054°57′06″W	
SWPY		Primavera do Leste Airport	Primavera do Leste, Mato Grosso	15°33′45″S 054°19′50″W	
SWPZ		Oriçanga de Abreu Airport	Posse, Goiás	14°07′05″S 046°20′43″W	
SWQA		Bonini Heliport	Campos do Jordão, São Paulo	22°43′56″S 045°33′35″W	
SWQB		Hahn Heliport	Piracaia, São Paulo	22°58′30″S 046°23′27″W	
SWQC		São Francisco Farm Aerodrome	Rio Verde, Goiás	17°30′10″S 051°35′42″W	
SWQD		Wyda Heliport	Sorocaba, São Paulo	23°26′36″S 047°26′11″W	
SWQE		Querari Aerodrome	São Gabriel da Cachoeira, Amazonas	01°05′17″N 069°50′17″W	
SWQF		Miguel Dias III Heliport	Guaramiranga, Ceará	04°14′18″S 038°58′53″W	
SWQG		Sossego Farm Aerodrome	Maracaju, Mato Grosso do Sul	21°27′30″S 055°24′59″W	
SWQH		Nova Santana Farm Aerodrome	Aripuanã, Mato Grosso	10°08′04″S 060°32′40″W	
SWQI		Caturama Farm Aerodrome	Zacarias, São Paulo	21°06′49″S 050°02′20″W	
SWQJ		Coomej Aerodrome	Laranjal do Jari, Amapá	00°06′07″S 052°57′00″W	
SWQK		Kubenkrankenh Village Aerodrome	Ourilândia do Norte, Pará	08°08′28″S 052°07′20″W	
SWQL		Três Companheiros Farm Aerodrome	Doverlândia, Goiás	16°40′57″S 052°15′10″W	
SWQM		Quinzeiro Moeda Farm Aerodrome	Moeda, Minas Gerais	20°19′19″S 044°02′31″W	
SWQN		Nego Velho Farm Aerodrome	Castanheira, Mato Grosso	10°58′37″S 058°26′42″W	
SWQO		Renascença Farm Aerodrome	Frutal, Minas Gerais	20°23′15″S 048°54′56″W	
SWQP		Rio Vermelho Açúcar e Álcool Aerodrome	Junqueirópolis, São Paulo	21°18′55″S 051°22′12″W	
SWQR		Taquarussu Farm Aerodrome	Sete Quedas, Mato Grosso do Sul	23°54′13″S 054°58′55″W	
SWQS		Santa Rosa Farm Aerodrome	Ribas do Rio Pardo, Mato Grosso do Sul	20°56′29″S 053°26′07″W	
SWQT		São Nicolau Farm Aerodrome	Cotriguaçu, Mato Grosso	09°51′45″S 058°13′51″W	
SWQU		Guaporé Farm Aerodrome	Vila Bela da Santíssima Trindade, Mato Grosso	14°36′04″S 060°07′18″W	
SWQV		Volkswagen Heliport	São Bernardo do Campo, São Paulo	23°43′46″S 046°32′59″W	
SWQW		Bacaeri Farm Aerodrome	Alta Floresta, Mato Grosso	10°03′04″S 056°49′56″W	
SWQX		Cachoeira Farm Aerodrome	Água Clara, Mato Grosso do Sul	19°41′54″S 053°04′53″W	
SWQY		Peturú Farm Aerodrome	Porto de Moz, Pará	02°41′04″S 052°22′03″W	
SWQZ		Portofino Heliport	Campos do Jordão, São Paulo	23°38′30″S 047°22′37″W	
SWRA	AAI	Arraias Airport	Arraias, Tocantins	13°01′26″S 046°53′08″W	
SWRB		Santa Rita Farm Aerodrome	Campinas do Sul, Rio Grande do Sul	27°42′23″S 052°43′26″W	
SWRC		Sevilha Farm Aerodrome	Ribeirão Cascalheira, Mato Grosso	12°38′25″S 051°55′50″W	
SWRD		Chácara Rondoagro Aerodrome	São Miguel do Guaporé, Rondônia	11°43′56″S 062°42′33″W	
SWRE		Renovo Farm Aerodrome	Alto Garças, Mato Grosso	16°46′14″S 053°31′37″W	
SWRF		Francisco Ramalho Aerodrome	Pedreiras, Maranhão	04°35′02″S 044°32′46″W	
SWRG		Maria e Tereza Ranch Aerodrome	Guajará-Mirim, Rondônia	10°49′34″S 065°13′46″W	
SWRH		Aurora Farm Aerodrome	São Desidério, Bahia	12°42′17″S 046°09′32″W	
SWRI		Roncador I Farm Aerodrome	Querência, Mato Grosso	12°09′26″S 052°16′21″W	
SWRJ		Kamar Heliport	Mangaratiba, Rio de Janeiro	22°56′15″S 044°04′45″W	
SWRK		Pedreira Pombal Fazenda Recanto Heliport	Barra Mansa, Rio de Janeiro	22°29′11″S 044°15′26″W	
SWRL		Pouso Redondo Farm Aerodrome	Corumbiara, Rondônia	12°58′38″S 061°02′57″W	
SWRM		Remanso Farm Aerodrome	Cacoal, Rondônia	11°10′56″S 061°05′20″W	
SWRN		Rio Negro Naval Station Heliport	Manaus, Amazonas	03°08′34″S 059°57′00″W	
SWRO		Rondônia Aeroclub Aerodrome	Porto Velho, Rondônia	08°47′37″S 063°51′29″W	
SWRP		Teles Pires Lodge Aerodrome	Apiacás, Mato Grosso	08°51′47″S 057°25′14″W	
SWRQ		Teresina Aero Park Aerodrome	Teresina, Piauí	05°03′38″S 042°40′28″W	
SWRR		Serra Azul Farm Aerodrome	Planalto da Serra, Mato Grosso	14°40′05″S 054°34′08″W	
SWRS		Santa Mônica Farm Aerodrome	Rondonópolis, Mato Grosso	16°58′31″S 054°45′18″W	
SWRT		Santa Rita Farm Aerodrome	Santa Rita do Araguaia, Goiás	17°20′49″S 053°11′38″W	
SWRU		Grupo Rotta Aerodrome	Novo Progresso, Pará	07°09′05″S 055°48′19″W	
SWRV		Rochaverá–Alfa Heliport	São Paulo, São Paulo	23°37′22″S 046°42′02″W	
SWRW		Santa Alice Farm Aerodrome	Mirassol d'Oeste, Mato Grosso	15°35′15″S 058°02′40″W	
SWRX		Piracema Farm Aerodrome	Nova Mutum, Mato Grosso	13°57′25″S 055°46′46″W	
SWRY		Santa Maria Farm Aerodrome	Porto Estrela, Mato Grosso	15°44′30″S 057°29′00″W	
SWRZ		Dourado Farm Aerodrome	Nortelândia, Mato Grosso	14°21′12″S 056°42′50″W	
SWSA		Santa Maria Farm Aerodrome	Londrina, Paraná	23°29′45″S 051°19′12″W	
SWSB		Santa Bárbara Farm Heliport	Vitória do Mearim, Maranhão	03°35′19″S 045°05′44″W	
SWSC		São Carlos Farm Aerodrome	Paraíso das Águas, Mato Grosso do Sul	19°10′39″S 053°06′10″W	
SWSD		Santo Antônio Farm Aerodrome	Araguaiana, Mato Grosso	15°37′01″S 051°48′52″W	
SWSE		Iguatemi Corporate Heliport	Porto Alegre, Rio Grande do Sul	30°01′42″S 051°09′46″W	
SWSF		São Francisco Farm Aerodrome	Vila Bela da Santíssima Trindade, Mato Grosso	15°13′26″S 060°13′00″W	
SWSG		Simarelli Farm Aerodrome	Campos de Júlio, Mato Grosso	13°36′16″S 059°19′02″W	
SWSH		Agropecuária Nossa Senhora Aparecida Farm Aerodrome	João Pinheiro, Minas Gerais	17°07′29″S 045°36′17″W	
SWSI		Amazônia Fishing Lodge Inn Aerodrome	Jacareacanga, Pará	09°08′21″S 057°02′59″W	
SWSJ		São José Farm Aerodrome	Sapezal, Mato Grosso	13°44′30″S 058°53′06″W	
SWSK		Akron Heliport	São Paulo, São Paulo	23°36′33″S 046°36′21″W	
SWSL		Aviação Estrela Bôscoli Aerodrome	Lucas do Rio Verde, Mato Grosso	13°19′24″S 056°02′56″W	
SWSM		Sulina Sementes Aerodrome	Diamantino, Mato Grosso	13°53′55″S 057°24′52″W	
SWSN		São Valentim Farm Aerodrome	Pontes e Lacerda, Mato Grosso	14°57′44″S 059°19′17″W	
SWSO		Socimed Heliport	Tubarão, Santa Catarina	28°28′26″S 048°59′20″W	
SWSP		Sopave Norte Aerodrome	Nova Ubiratã, Mato Grosso	13°43′31″S 054°44′18″W	
SWSQ		São Joaquim Aerodrome	São Gabriel da Cachoeira, Amazonas	01°42′01″N 069°23′22″W	
SWSR		Guará Heliport	Godofredo Viana, Maranhão	01°17′57″S 045°45′05″W	
SWSS		Sapucaí Heliport	Rio de Janeiro, Rio de Janeiro	22°54′35″S 043°11′54″W	
SWST	STZ	Santa Terezinha Airport	Santa Terezinha, Mato Grosso	10°27′53″S 050°31′07″W	
SWSU		Santa Umbelina Farm Aerodrome	Naviraí, Mato Grosso do Sul	22°56′16″S 053°49′46″W	
SWSV		Santa Silvia Farm Aerodrome	Cocalinho, Mato Grosso	14°23′19″S 051°22′50″W	
SWSW		Toca PCDF Heliport	Brasília, Federal District	15°46′47″S 047°54′47″W	
SWSX	XIG	Xinguara Municipal Airport	Xinguara, Pará	07°05′26″S 049°58′35″W	
SWSY		Santa Inês Farm Aerodrome	Espírito Santo do Pinhal, São Paulo	22°10′36″S 046°42′55″W	
SWSZ		Santa Luzia Farm Aerodrome	Nova Bandeirantes, Mato Grosso	09°46′25″S 058°03′46″W	
SWTA		Stelita Heliport	Pouso Alegre, Minas Gerais	22°13′47″S 045°56′04″W	
SWTB		Tarobá Aerodrome	Santa Terezinha de Itaipu, Paraná	25°32′53″S 054°29′07″W	
SWTC		Beatriz Farm Aerodrome	Brasilândia, Mato Grosso do Sul	21°04′19″S 052°06′15″W	
SWTD		Nova Agropecuária Aerodrome	Nova Bandeirantes, Mato Grosso	09°17′43″S 058°08′36″W	
SWTE		West Side Heliport	Barueri, São Paulo	23°30′13″S 046°50′58″W	
SWTF		JBS Heliport	São Paulo, São Paulo	23°30′49″S 046°43′52″W	
SWTG		Santa Marina Farm Aerodrome	Santo Antônio do Aracanguá, São Paulo	20°50′50″S 050°47′17″W	
SWTH		Smith Farm Aerodrome	Bonfim, Roraima	02°55′09″N 060°30′46″W	
SWTI		São Vicente Aerodrome	Nova Lacerda, Mato Grosso	14°31′10″S 059°46′48″W	
SWTJ		Cachoeira Farm Aerodrome	Tangará da Serra, Mato Grosso	14°33′57″S 057°46′41″W	
SWTK		Santa Maria do Guaporé Farm Aerodrome	Vila Bela da Santíssima Trindade, Mato Grosso	14°11′58″S 060°16′48″W	
SWTL		Corumbiara Farm Aerodrome	Parecis, Rondônia	12°30′52″S 061°18′14″W	
SWTM		Moro Golf Club Heliport	Ponta Grossa, Paraná	25°06′53″S 050°10′20″W	
SWTN		Arapucel Farm Aerodrome	Araputanga, Mato Grosso	15°02′46″S 058°43′45″W	
SWTO		Paraíso do Tocantins Airport	Paraíso do Tocantins, Tocantins	10°10′26″S 048°55′58″W	
SWTP	IRZ	Tapuruquara Airport	Santa Isabel do Rio Negro, Amazonas	00°25′43″S 064°59′35″W	
SWTQ		Rio Quente Resorts Aerodrome	Rio Quente, Goiás	17°46′08″S 048°45′42″W	
SWTR		Taraquá Aerodrome	São Gabriel da Cachoeira, Amazonas	00°07′29″N 068°32′44″W	
SWTS	TGQ	Tangará da Serra Airport	Tangará da Serra, Mato Grosso	14°39′43″S 057°26′38″W	
SWTT		Supermax Heliport	Curitiba, Paraná	25°25′57″S 049°19′34″W	
SWTU		Tucunaré Farm Aerodrome	Sapezal, Mato Grosso	13°27′54″S 058°51′59″W	
SWTV		On Grace Heliport	Rio de Janeiro, Rio de Janeiro	22°55′57″S 043°22′27″W	
SWTW		BS Tower Heliport	Fortaleza, Ceará	03°43′52″S 038°30′57″W	
SWTX		Olho d'Água Farm Aerodrome	Torixoreu, Mato Grosso	16°08′43″S 052°58′17″W	
SWTY		Taguatinga Airport	Taguatinga, Tocantins	12°26′06″S 046°24′01″W	
SWTZ		Santo Antônio Farm–Zampieri Aerodrome	Ribas do Rio Pardo, Mato Grosso do Sul	20°44′21″S 053°32′08″W	
SWUA		São Miguel do Araguaia Airport	São Miguel do Araguaia, Goiás	13°20′02″S 050°12′21″W	
SWUB		Belo Horizonte Aerodrome	Araças, Bahia	12°09′48″S 038°17′36″W	
SWUC		Ouro Verde II Farm Aerodrome	Campo Novo do Parecis, Mato Grosso	13°30′54″S 057°53′33″W	
SWUD		Deputado Oswaldo Tolentino Airport	Cláudio, Minas Gerais	20°26′45″S 044°48′47″W	
SWUE		Tapayuna Farm Aerodrome	Nova Canaã do Norte, Mato Grosso	12°43′38″S 052°23′06″W	
SWUF		Cervejaria Petrópolis Heliport	Boituva, São Paulo	23°15′29″S 047°39′38″W	
SWUG		Betim/Contagem Mater Dei Hospital Heliport	Betim, Minas Gerais	19°56′28″S 044°08′52″W	
SWUH		Primavera Farm Aerodrome	Cáceres, Mato Grosso	16°14′49″S 057°37′18″W	
SWUI		Ilha do Maia Heliport	Angra dos Reis, Rio de Janeiro	23°01′38″S 044°19′56″W	
SWUJ		São Gotardo Aerodrome	São Gotardo, Minas Gerais	19°20′51″S 046°06′15″W	
SWUK		Uapui-Cachoeira Aerodrome	São Gabriel da Cachoeira, Amazonas	01°12′59″N 069°12′02″W	
SWUL		Furna Azul Farm Aerodrome	Ananás, Tocantins	06°12′57″S 048°25′33″W	
SWUM		Praia Grande Heliport	Fundão, Espírito Santo	20°02′16″S 040°10′44″W	
SWUN		União Farm Aerodrome	Inocência, Mato Grosso do Sul	19°17′33″S 052°03′39″W	
SWUO		Arroz Cristal Heliport	Aparecida de Goiânia, Goiás	16°48′24″S 049°14′40″W	
SWUP		Almenat Heliport	Embu das Artes, São Paulo	23°38′47″S 046°52′57″W	
SWUQ		Surucucu Airport	Alto Alegre, Roraima	02°50′07″N 063°38′49″W	
SWUR		Ressaca Farm Aerodrome	Cáceres, Mato Grosso	16°11′19″S 057°42′20″W	
SWUS		Cacau Show Heliport	Itapevi, São Paulo	23°31′06″S 046°57′56″W	
SWUT		Fiat Betim Heliport	Betim, Minas Gerais	19°58′14″S 044°06′24″W	
SWUU		Uirapuru Farm Aerodrome	Feliz Natal, Mato Grosso	12°06′02″S 054°10′31″W	
SWUV		Progresso Farm Aerodrome	Sebastião Leal, Piauí	07°30′10″S 044°11′45″W	
SWUW		Okuhara Farm Aerodrome	Barra do Bugres, Mato Grosso	15°06′50″S 056°50′13″W	
SWUX		4 Amigos Farm Aerodrome	Abreulândia, Tocantins	09°14′35″S 049°40′06″W	
SWUY		Videira Farm Aerodrome	Poconé, Mato Grosso	16°47′45″S 057°13′49″W	
SWUZ		Luziânia Airport	Luziânia, Goiás	16°15′42″S 047°58′07″W	
SWVA		Salvador Municipal Hospital Heliport	Salvador, Bahia	12°53′52″S 038°23′22″W	
SWVB		ICPB Heliport	Porto Belo, Santa Catarina	27°08′36″S 048°31′57″W	
SWVC	VLP	Vila Rica Airport	Vila Rica, Mato Grosso	09°58′52″S 051°08′26″W	
SWVD		Vila Don Patto Heliport	São Roque, São Paulo	23°33′47″S 047°08′12″W	
SWVE		Tree Bies Resort Heliport	Entre Rios, Bahia	12°14′23″S 037°46′32″W	
SWVF		Santo Antônio do Guaporé Farm	Vila Bela da Santíssima Trindade, Mato Grosso	16°00′40″S 059°55′30″W	
SWVG		Riacho Verde Heliport	Tauá, Ceará	05°58′15″S 040°17′54″W	
SWVH		Kinbor Heliport	Praia Grande, São Paulo	24°00′42″S 046°25′00″W	
SWVJ		São Judas Tadeu Farm Aerodrome	Comodoro, Mato Grosso	13°35′53″S 059°57′02″W	
SWVK		Vale do Rio Celeste Farm Aerodrome	Nova Ubiratã, Mato Grosso	13°02′07″S 055°19′40″W	
SWVL		Volkswagen São Carlos Heliport	São Carlos, São Paulo	22°03′49″S 047°52′27″W	
SWVM		Vinte e Oito Heliport	Belo Horizonte, Minas Gerais	19°57′46″S 043°57′30″W	
SWVN		Novo Horizonte Farm Flying Club Aerodrome	Itu, São Paulo	23°10′23″S 047°24′43″W	
SWVO		Goaçu Farm Aerodrome	Ribas do Rio Pardo, Mato Grosso do Sul	20°01′50″S 053°21′31″W	
SWVP		Ages Heliport	Paripiranga, Bahia	10°41′39″S 037°50′41″W	
SWVQ		Turim Heliport	Buíque, Pernambuco	08°41′38″S 037°16′15″W	
SWVR		Canarinho Aerodrome	Sinop, Mato Grosso	11°54′24″S 055°27′22″W	
SWVS		Baía do Padre Aerodrome	Vila Bela da Santíssima Trindade, Mato Grosso	15°51′32″S 060°02′32″W	
SWVT		Via Catarina Heliport	Palhoça, Santa Catarina	27°38′31″S 048°40′23″W	
SWVU		Ramalhete Farm Aerodrome	Rio Brilhante, Mato Grosso do Sul	21°44′03″S 054°34′38″W	
SWVV		Bela Vista Farm Aerodrome	Vila Bela da Santíssima Trindade, Mato Grosso	15°45′12″S 060°05′56″W	
SWVW		Furnaspark Resort Aerodrome	Formiga, Minas Gerais	20°32′10″S 045°36′17″W	
SWVX		Guariba Farm Aerodrome	Aripuanã, Mato Grosso	10°14′29″S 060°08′28″W	
SWVY		Floresta Negra Farm Aerodrome	Sete Quedas, Mato Grosso do Sul	23°48′54″S 054°41′59″W	
SWVZ		Empresa de Mineração Aripuanã Aerodrome	Nobres, Mato Grosso	14°45′00″S 056°21′10″W	
SWWA		Porangatu Airport	Porangatu, Goiás	13°24′16″S 049°09′26″W	
SWWB		Helibrusque Heliport	Brusque, Santa Catarina	27°04′48″S 048°54′46″W	
SWWD		Dom Pedro Business Park Heliport	Atibaia, São Paulo	23°03′02″S 046°40′22″W	
SWWE		M. Baumann Aerodrome	Piên, Paraná	26°02′09″S 049°30′03″W	
SWWF		Inhumas do Chapadão Farm Aerodrome	Uberaba, Minas Gerais	19°18′21″S 048°11′36″W	
SWWG		Vera Gol Heliport	Itaboraí, Rio de Janeiro	22°45′11″S 042°52′46″W	
SWWH		Marca Salto Farm Aerodrome	Angélica, Mato Grosso do Sul	21°59′00″S 053°54′14″W	
SWWI		Fortaleza Farm Aerodrome	Tesouro, Mato Grosso	15°40′42″S 053°34′57″W	
SWWJ		Helvétia MF Heliport	Indaiatuba, São Paulo	23°03′43″S 047°09′46″W	
SWWK		Bruno Forcela Heliport	Itapecerica, Minas Gerais	20°28′00″S 045°07′37″W	
SWWL		Agrocentro Farm Aerodrome	Barra do Garças, Mato Grosso	15°41′14″S 052°15′59″W	
SWWM		Mantena Aerodrome	Mantena, Minas Gerais	18°46′19″S 040°56′55″W	
SWWN		Pingo d'Água Heliport	Angra dos Reis, Rio de Janeiro	22°59′55″S 044°26′12″W	
SWWO		Niely do Brasil Heliport	Nova Iguaçu, Rio de Janeiro	22°42′05″S 043°28′03″W	
SWWP		Pontal Farm Aerodrome	Corumbaíba, Goiás	18°19′20″S 048°50′38″W	
SWWQ		Santa Maria Farm Aerodrome	Mundo Novo, Goiás	13°46′10″S 049°56′07″W	
SWWR		Roseira Farm Aerodrome	São Raimundo das Mangabeiras, Maranhão	07°13′52″S 045°52′55″W	
SWWS		Sorocaba Business Park Heliport	Sorocaba, São Paulo	23°26′43″S 047°23′22″W	
SWWT		Sílvio Gonçalves de Mello Aerodrome	Morada Nova de Minas, Minas Gerais	18°42′20″S 045°20′08″W	
SWWU		Uruaçu Airport	Uruaçu, Goiás	14°32′41″S 049°05′28″W	
SWWV		Santa Maria Environmental Protection Station Aerodrome	Barão de Melgaço, Mato Grosso	16°42′23″S 056°01′45″W	
SWWW		São Luis Environmental Protection Station Aerodrome	Barão de Melgaço, Mato Grosso	16°41′21″S 056°10′39″W	
SWWX		São Joaquim Environmental Protection Station Aerodrome	Barão de Melgaço, Mato Grosso	16°44′46″S 056°22′12″W	
SWWY		Espírito Santo Environmental Protection Station Aerodrome	Barão de Melgaço, Mato Grosso	16°35′17″S 056°16′49″W	
SWWZ		WSA Farm Aerodrome	General Carneiro, Mato Grosso	15°23′01″S 053°27′33″W	
SWXA		Canadazinho Farm Aerodrome	Jussara, Goiás	15°02′32″S 051°24′02″W	
SWXB		Jangada Farm Aerodrome	Campo Verde, Mato Grosso	15°17′51″S 055°10′33″W	
SWXC		Tropical Farm Aerodrome	Corumbiara, Rondônia	12°53′08″S 061°17′55″W	
SWXD		Joatão do Colorado Aerodrome	São Félix do Araguaia, Mato Grosso	11°29′37″S 052°37′07″W	
SWXE		PCH Paranatinga II Aerodrome	Campinápolis, Mato Grosso	13°52′39″S 053°14′22″W	
SWXF		Triflora Farm Aerodrome	São Desidério, Bahia	12°26′56″S 045°40′46″W	
SWXG		Cachoeirinha Farm Aerodrome	Caiapônia, Goiás	17°13′57″S 051°39′01″W	
SWXH		Helibúzios Heliport	Armação dos Búzios, Rio de Janeiro	22°45′19″S 041°57′39″W	
SWXI		Praia do Paiva Heliport	Jaboatão dos Guararapes, Pernambuco	08°14′21″S 034°56′17″W	Closed
SWXJ		Chácara São José Aerodrome	Cuiabá, Mato Grosso	15°35′45″S 056°00′15″W	
SWXK		Santa Thereza Farm Aerodrome	Aparecida do Rio Doce, Goiás	18°13′45″S 051°12′29″W	
SWXL		Santa Maria Farm Aerodrome	Inocência, Mato Grosso do Sul	19°43′16″S 051°57′01″W	
SWXM	MBK	Matupá Airport	Matupá, Mato Grosso	10°10′12″S 054°57′14″W	
SWXO		Porto Seguro Farm Aerodrome	São Félix do Xingu, Pará	07°07′54″S 052°43′38″W	
SWXP		Gold Bravo Aerodrome	Itaituba, Pará	05°47′41″S 057°03′06″W	
SWXQ	LIP	Lins Airport	Lins, São Paulo	21°39′46″S 049°43′52″W	Formerly SBLN
SWXR		Flights Ranch Farm Aerodrome	Santana, Bahia	13°00′20″S 044°03′38″W	
SWXS		Poças Farm Aerodrome	Santo Antônio do Leverger, Mato Grosso	16°09′41″S 056°00′28″W	
SWXT		Parnaguá Farm Aerodrome	Santa Filomena, Piauí	09°06′21″S 045°37′03″W	
SWXU		E-AR Aerodrome	Brasília, Federal District	15°42′02″S 047°44′14″W	
SWXV	NOK	Nova Xavantina Airport	Nova Xavantina, Mato Grosso	14°41′52″S 052°20′50″W	
SWXW		Montani Bahia Farm Aerodrome	São Desidério, Bahia	13°00′00″S 046°04′32″W	
SWXX		Canadá Farm Aerodrome	Uberlândia, Minas Gerais	18°51′43″S 048°25′23″W	
SWXY		Igurê Farm Heliport	Gália, São Paulo	22°15′06″S 049°36′20″W	
SWXZ		Taquarussu Farm Aerodrome	Comodoro, Mato Grosso	13°18′33″S 060°17′39″W	
SWYA		Santa Helena Farm	Ribas do Rio Pardo, Mato Grosso do Sul	20°12′01″S 053°20′11″W	
SWYB		Mina Brucutu Heliport	São Gonçalo do Rio Abaixo, Minas Gerais	19°52′10″S 043°23′43″W	
SWYC		Alegre Ranch Farm I Aerodrome	Vila Bela da Santíssima Trindade, Mato Grosso	16°15′22″S 059°42′54″W	
SWYD		Spazio Faria Lima Heliport	São Paulo, São Paulo	23°35′07″S 046°40′56″W	
SWYE		São Lourenço Farm Aerodrome	Alegrete, Rio Grande do Sul	29°33′21″S 055°47′04″W	
SWYF		Ambipar Heliport	Nova Odessa, São Paulo	22°45′36″S 047°15′15″W	
SWYG		Graciosa Aerodrome	Piraquara, Paraná	25°24′23″S 049°03′09″W	
SWYH		Aliança Farm Aerodrome	Araputanga, Mato Grosso	15°17′33″S 058°18′52″W	
SWYI		Iporanga Heliport	Campos do Jordão, São Paulo	22°42′12″S 045°30′45″W	
SWYJ		San Martin Aerodrome	Campos dos Goytacazes, Rio de Janeiro	22°00′24″S 041°13′09″W	
SWYK		Ilha Camargo Farm Aerodrome	Barão de Melgaço, Mato Grosso	17°03′45″S 056°35′01″W	
SWYL		Carrapato Farm Aerodrome	Itapipoca, Ceará	03°30′40″S 039°38′37″W	
SWYM		Anhanguera Farm Airport	Conquista d'Oeste, Mato Grosso	14°38′30″S 059°27′00″W	
SWYN	IUP	Apuí Airport	Apuí, Amazonas	07°10′20″S 059°50′20″W	
SWYO		Usina Branco Peres Aerodrome	Adamantina, São Paulo	21°28′56″S 051°01′31″W	
SWYP		Platinum Corporate Heliport	Fortaleza, Ceará	03°43′59″S 038°30′34″W	
SWYQ		Brusque Farm Aerodrome	São Félix do Xingu, Pará	09°17′04″S 051°45′06″W	
SWYR		Nossa Senhora do Pilar Farm Aerodrome	Jauru, Mato Grosso	15°21′03″S 058°47′38″W	
SWYS		Usina Cerradão Aerodrome	Frutal, Mato Grosso	19°55′48″S 049°07′22″W	
SWYT		BS Design II Heliport	Fortaleza, Ceará	03°44′14″S 038°29′58″W	
SWYU		Sagarana Farm Aerodrome	Correntina, Bahia	13°44′39″S 046°09′47″W	
SWYV		Ibirá Aerosporting Club Aerodrome	Ibirá, São Paulo	21°05′29″S 049°13′27″W	
SWYW		Adriana Farm Aerodrome	Alto Garças, Mato Grosso	16°49′51″S 053°50′01″W	
SWYX		Zancchetin Farm Aerodrome	Lucas do Rio Verde, Mato Grosso	13°01′10″S 056°07′33″W	
SWYY		Nova Viena Farm Aerodrome	Barra do Garças, Mato Grosso	14°53′10″S 052°16′41″W	
SWYZ		Bahiamido Heliport	Laje, Bahia	13°06′32″S 039°17′03″W	
SWZA		Agrosan Aerodrome	Juara, Mato Grosso	11°23′49″S 058°07′02″W	
SWZB		Fronteira Heliport	Ilhabela, São Paulo	23°46′04″S 045°20′53″W	
SWZC		Corixo Farm Aerodrome	Porto Esperidião, Mato Grosso	16°14′45″S 058°53′40″W	
SWZD		Denusa Destilaria Nova União Farm Aerodrome	Jandaia, Goiás	17°15′22″S 050°08′33″W	
SWZE		Tamboril Farm Aerodrome	Pontes e Lacerda, Mato Grosso	15°03′35″S 059°22′46″W	
SWZF		Haras Recanto dos Gypsies Heliport	Porto Feliz, São Paulo	23°14′12″S 047°30′01″W	
SWZG		Lagoa Encantada Farm Aerodrome	Porto Esperidião, Mato Grosso	16°01′20″S 058°53′40″W	
SWZH		Fazenda XV de Outubro Aerodrome	Colatina, Espírito Santo	19°27′51″S 040°40′02″W	
SWZI		Multitoc Heliport	Itajubá, Minas Gerais	22°25′54″S 045°26′03″W	
SWZJ		Porto dos Sonhos Heliport	Armação dos Búzios, Rio de Janeiro	22°45′42″S 041°56′30″W	
SWZK		CON-CN-Cidade Nova Heliport	Rio de Janeiro, Rio de Janeiro	22°54′41″S 043°12′12″W	Closed
SWZL		Base Aeroverde Aerodrome	Rio Verde, Goiás	17°44′29″S 050°58′08″W	
SWZM		América Farm Aerodrome	Porto dos Gaúchos, Mato Grosso	11°32′29″S 056°31′15″W	
SWZN		Tunica Farm Aerodrome	Água Boa, Mato Grosso	14°04′18″S 052°02′22″W	
SWZO		Lagoa Funda Farm Aerodrome	Campo Verde, Mato Grosso	15°20′27″S 055°08′27″W	
SWZP		Vale Rico Farm Aerodrome	São José do Povo, Mato Grosso	16°23′08″S 054°12′15″W	
SWZQ		Jussara Farm Aerodrome	Santa Fé de Goiás, Goiás	15°50′43″S 051°04′19″W	
SWZR		Sertaneja Farm Aerodrome	Alta Floresta, Mato Grosso	09°42′16″S 056°00′42″W	
SWZS		Nova Larga Farm Aerodrome	Cáceres, Mato Grosso	16°40′23″S 057°40′29″W	
SWZT		Fazenda do Brejo Aerodrome	Paraopeba, Minas Gerais	19°15′18″S 044°28′25″W	
SWZU		Cepasa Heliport	Jaboatão dos Guararapes, Pernambuco	08°07′42″S 035°00′47″W	Closed
SWZV		Integrada Farm Aerodrome	Correntina, Bahia	13°47′36″S 046°02′19″W	
SWZW		Grupo Petrópolis Alagoinhas Heliport	Alagoinhas, Bahia	12°09′49″S 038°26′56″W	
SWZX		Selma Nunes Aerodrome	Macaúbas, Bahia	13°05′39″S 042°33′09″W	
SWZY		Estrela do Sangue Farm Aerodrome	Brasnorte, Mato Grosso	11°34′38″S 058°14′03″W	
SWZZ		Graer Heliport	Joinville, Santa Catarina	26°15′48″S 048°51′31″W	

== SY - Guyana ==
Also see airport category and list.

ICAO	IATA	Airport name	Community	Coordinates	Notes
SYAH	AHL	Aishalton Airport	Aishalton	02°28′20″N 059°19′20″W	
SYAN	NAI	Annai Airport	Annai	03°57′45″N 059°07′15″W	
SYAP		Apoteri Airport	Apoteri	04°00′55″N 058°36′14″W	
SYAW		Awaruwaunau Airport	Awarewaunau	02°38′50″N 059°11′40″W	
SYBE	BCG	Bemichi Airport	Kumaka	07°38′25″N 058°57′43″W	
SYBR	BMJ	Baramita Airport	Baramita	07°22′20″N 060°29′15″W	
SYBT	GFO	Bartica Airport	Bartica	06°21′35″N 058°39′15″W	
SYCJ	GEO	Cheddi Jagan International Airport	Georgetown	06°29′54″N 058°15′14″W	
SYEB		Ebini Airport	Ebini	05°34′05″N 057°46′35″W	
SYEC	OGL	Eugene F. Correia International Airport	Georgetown / Ogle	06°48′26″N 058°06′21″W	Formerly SYGO
SYGH		Good Hope Airport	Good Hope	06°59′06″N 058°30′02″W	
SYIB	IMB	Imbaimadai Airport	Imbaimadai	05°42′25″N 060°17′45″W	
SYKA	KAI	Kaieteur Airport	Kaieteur National Park	05°10′40″N 059°29′15″W	
SYKI		Kaow Island Airport	Kaow Island	06°25′59″N 058°37′21″W	Closed
SYKK		Kurukabaru Airport	Kurukabaru	04°42′50″N 059°54′40″W	
SYKM	KAR	Kamarang Airport	Kamarang	05°51′55″N 060°36′50″W	
SYKR	KRM	Karanambo Airport	Karanambo	03°46′15″N 059°20′35″W	
SYKS	KRG	Karasabai Airport	Karasabai	04°01′45″N 059°33′00″W	
SYKT	KTO	Kato Airport	Kato	04°39′00″N 059°49′50″W	
SYKW		Kwakwani Airport	Kwakwani	05°15′35″N 058°03′54″W	
SYLD		Linden Airport	Linden	05°57′57″N 058°16′13″W	
SYLP	LUB	Lumid Pau Airport	Lumid Pau	02°23′40″N 059°26′15″W	
SYLT	LTM	Lethem Airport	Lethem	03°22′20″N 059°47′25″W	
SYMB	USI	Mabaruma Airport	Mabaruma	08°12′05″N 059°46′35″W	
SYMD	MHA	Mahdia Airport	Mahdia	05°16′10″N 059°08′50″W	
SYMM	MYM	Monkey Mountain Airport	Monkey Mountain	04°27′08″N 059°36′10″W	
SYMN		Manari Airport	Manari	03°26′14″N 059°46′22″W	
SYMP	PMT	Mountain Point Airport	Mountain Point	02°59′55″N 059°37′50″W	
SYMR	MWJ	Matthews Ridge Airport	Matthews Ridge	07°29′16″N 060°11′08″W	
SYMW		Maruranawa Airport	Maruranau	02°43′44″N 059°08′58″W	
SYNA	QSX	New Amsterdam Airport	New Amsterdam	06°14′40″N 057°28′25″W	
SYOR	ORJ	Orinduik Airport	Orinduik	04°43′40″N 060°02′00″W	
SYPK	PKM	Port Kaituma Airport	Port Kaituma	07°44′33″N 059°52′55″W	
SYPM	PMT	Paramakatoi Airport	Paramakatoi	04°41′51″N 059°42′45″W	
SYPR	PRR	Paruima Airport	Paruima	05°49′00″N 061°03′20″W	
SYSC	SDC	Sand Creek Airport	Sand Creek	02°59′52″N 059°31′30″W	
SYWI		Wichabai Airport	Wichabai	02°52′05″N 059°31′51″W	
