= São Miguel do Tapuio =

Coordinates: 5°30′S 41°20′W

- Municipality
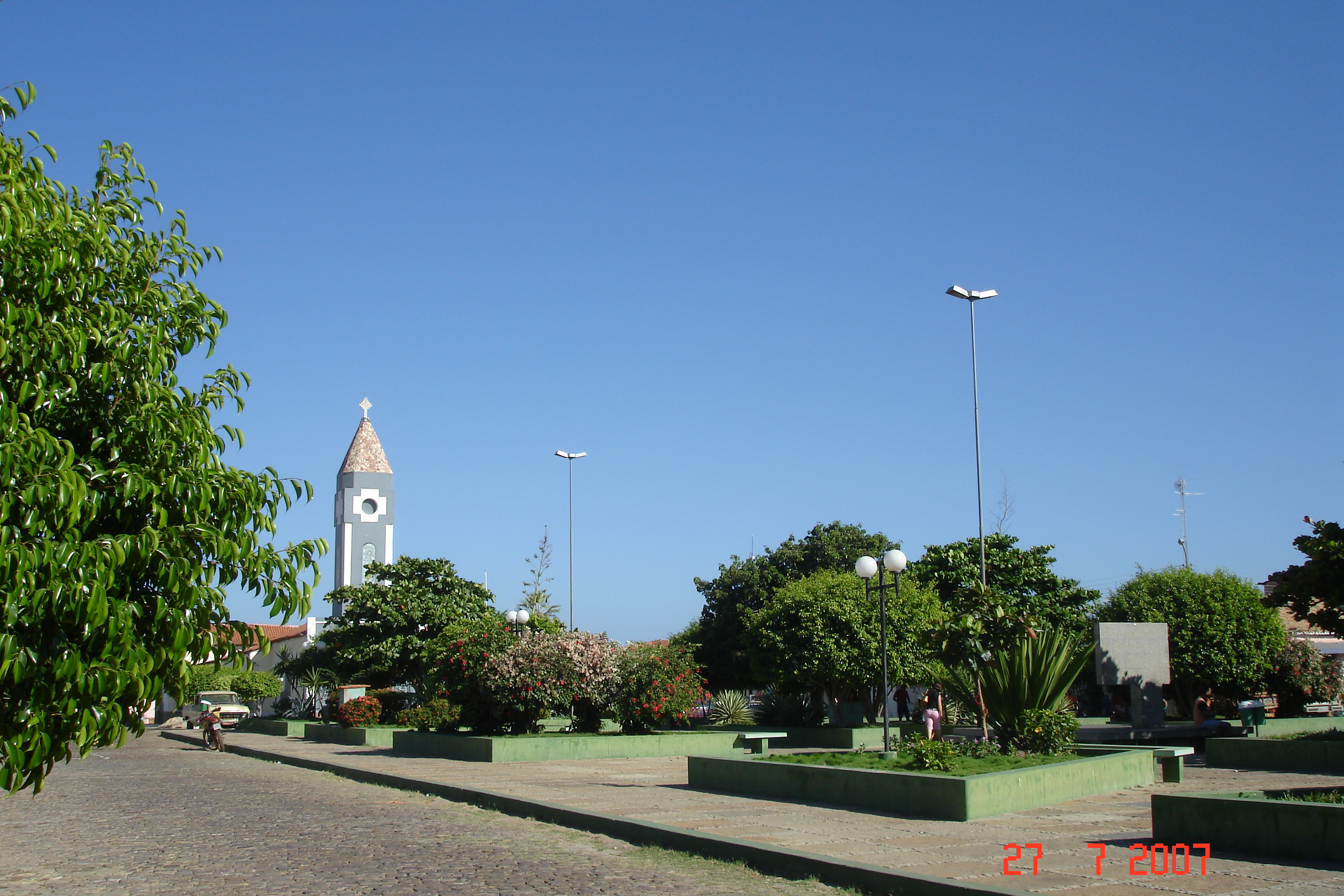

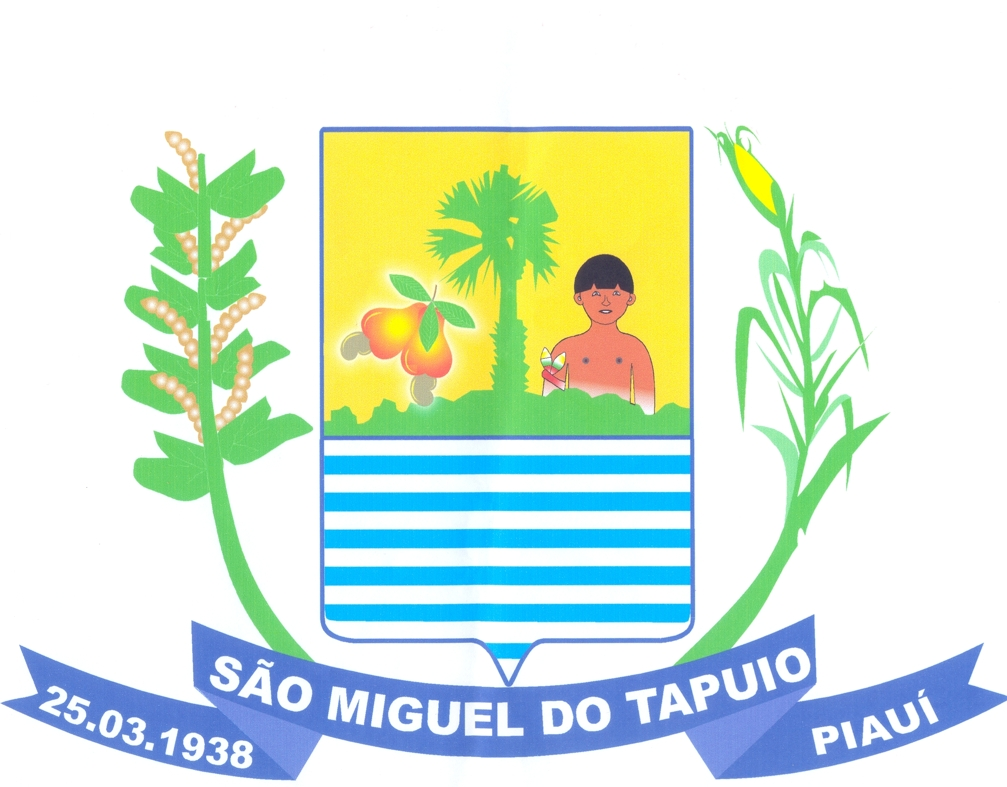
- Coat of arms

- Country: Brazil
- Region: Nordeste
- State: Piauí
- Mesoregion: Centro-Norte Piauiense

Population (2020)
  - Total: 17,639
- Time zone: UTC−3 (BRT)

São Miguel do Tapuio is a municipality in the state of Piauí in the Northeast region of Brazil.

== See also ==
- List of municipalities in Piauí
