= Piên =

Coordinates: 26°06′S 49°26′W

- Municipality
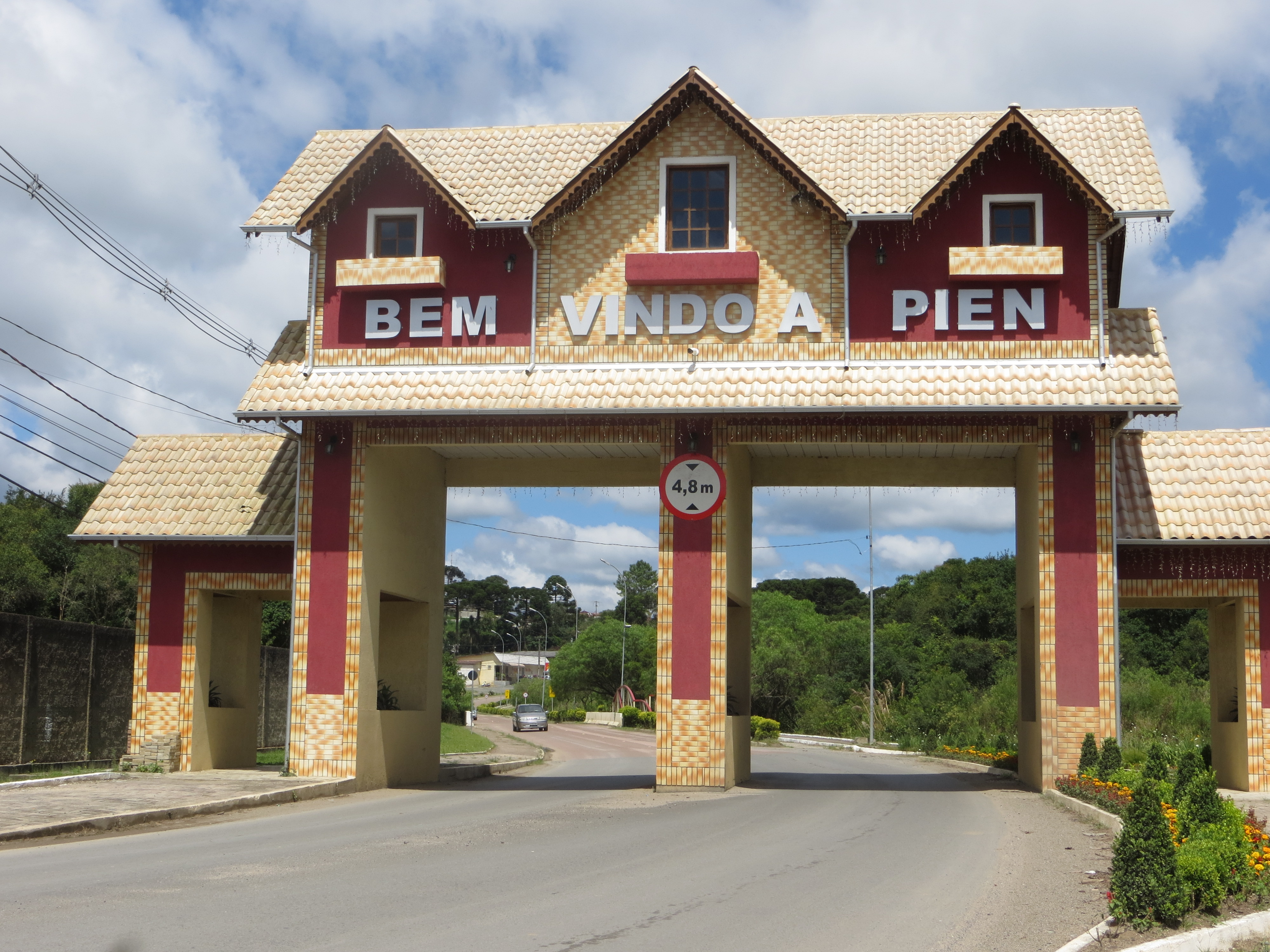

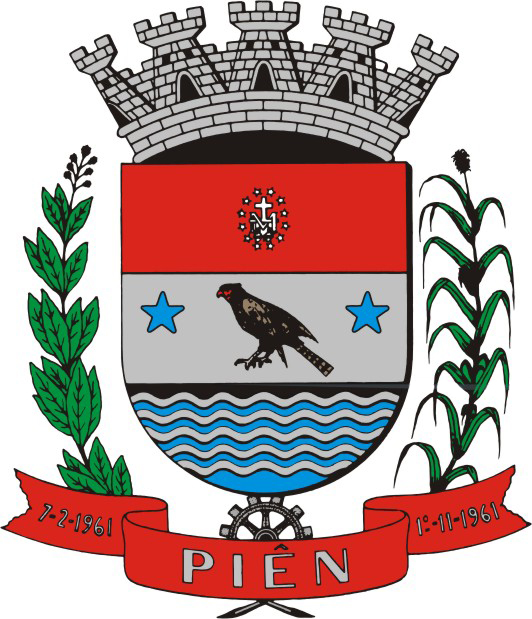
- Flag Coat of arms
- Interactive map of Piên
- Country: Brazil
- Region: Southern
- State: Paraná
- Mesoregion: Metropolitana de Curitiba

Population (2020)
  - Total: 12,882
- Time zone: UTC−3 (BRT)

Piên is a municipality in the state of Paraná in the Southern Region of Brazil.

== See also ==
- List of municipalities in Paraná
