= São Miguel de Taipu =

Coordinates: 7°15′S 35°13′W

- Municipality
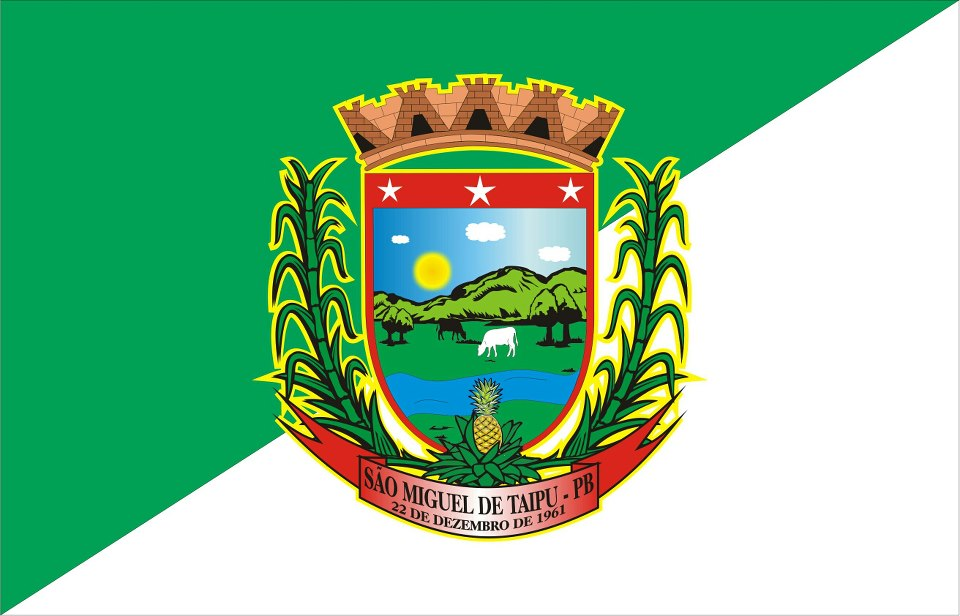
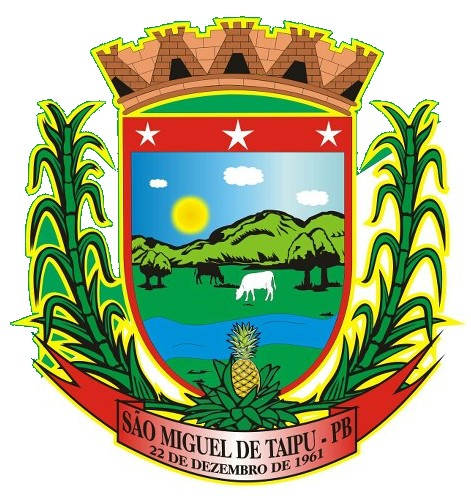
- Flag Coat of arms
- Interactive map of São Miguel de Taipu
- Country: Brazil
- Region: Northeast
- State: Paraíba
- Mesoregion: Mata Paraibana

Population (2020)
  - Total: 7,410
- Time zone: UTC−3 (BRT)

São Miguel de Taipu is a municipality in the state of Paraíba in the Northeast Region of Brazil.

== See also ==
- List of municipalities in Paraíba
