= Monte Carmelo Municipality =

Monte Carmelo Municipality Municipio Monte Carmelo
- Municipality
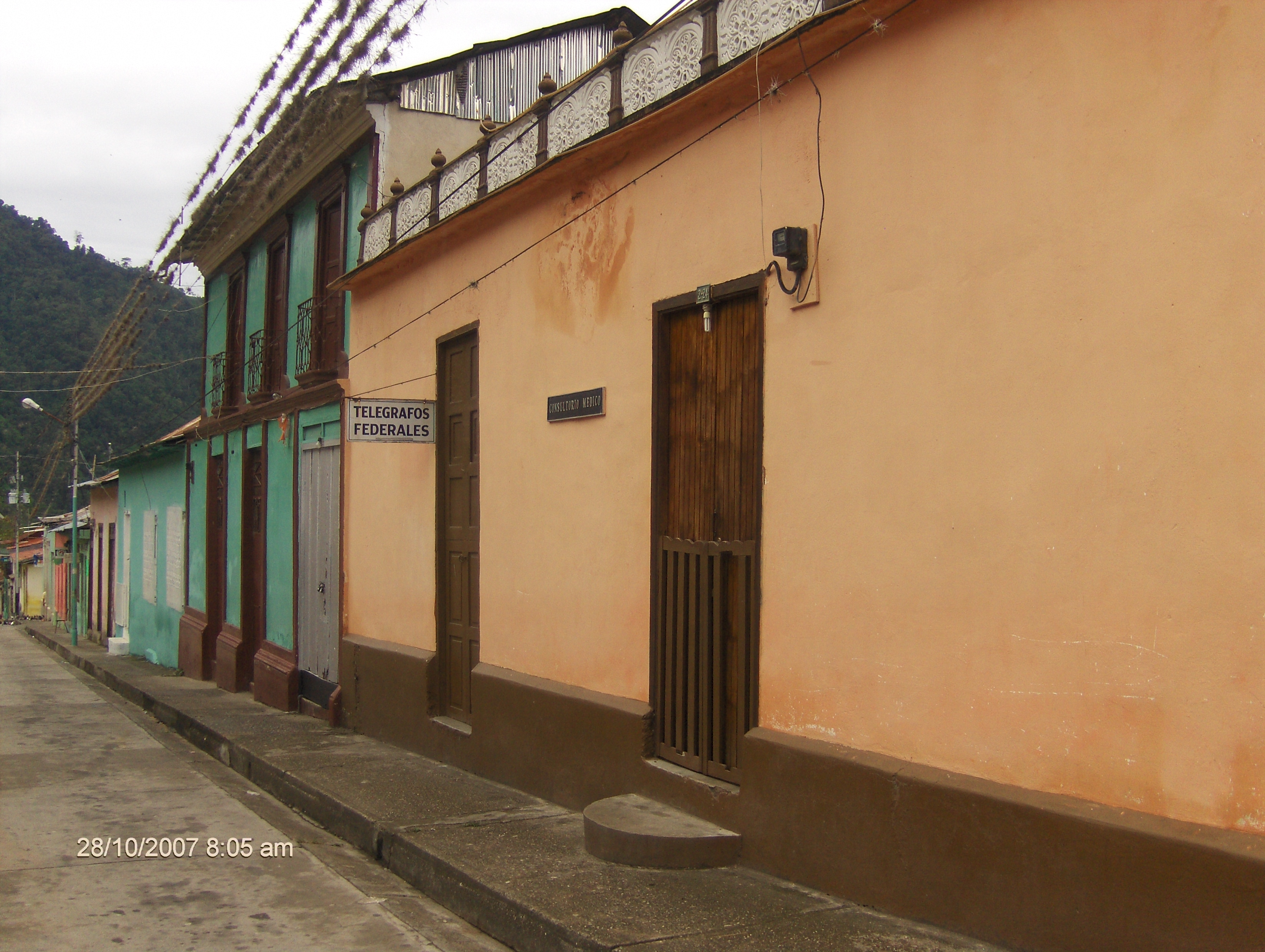
- The office of the Telegrafos federales in the town of Monte Carmelo.

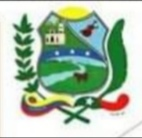
- Flag Seal

- Location in Trujillo

- Location in Venezuela
- Coordinates: 9°11′15″N 70°48′47″W
- Country: Venezuela
- State: Trujillo
- Founded: 1675
- Municipal seat: Monte Carmelo

Government
  - Mayor: Héctor Peña Linares (PSUV)

Area
  - Total: 386 km^{2} (149 sq mi)
- Elevation: 940 m (3,080 ft)

Population (2011)
  - Total: 16,174
  - Density: 41.9/km^{2} (109/sq mi)
- Time zone: UTC−4 (VET)

Monte Carmelo is one of the 20 municipalities of the state of Trujillo, Venezuela. The municipality occupies an area of 386 km^{2} with a population of 16,174 inhabitants according to the 2011 census.

== Parishes ==
The municipality consists of the following three parishes:

- Buena Vista
- Monte Carmelo
- Santa María del Horcón
