= Cocalinho =

- Municipality
- Municipal location within the State of Mato Grosso

- Location in Brazil
- Coordinates: 13.80273°S 51.15344°W
- Country: Brazil
- Region: Center-West
- State: Mato Grosso
- Mesoregion: Nordeste Mato-Grossense

Government
  - Mayor: Dalva Maria De Lima Peres

Area
  - Total: 16,516.319 km^{2} (6,376.986 sq mi)
- Elevation: 231 m (758 ft)

Population (2020)
  - Total: 5,681
  - Density: 0.3440/km^{2} (0.8909/sq mi)
- Demonym: cocalinhense
- Time zone: UTC−3 (BRT)

Cocalinho is a municipality in the Brazilian state of Mato Grosso. It has an area of 16,516.319 square kilometres (6,376.986 sq mi). It has a tropical savanna climate. As of 2020 the estimated population was 5,681.

== Geography ==
Cocalinho is in the state of Mato Grosso, Brazil. It has an area of 16,516.319 square kilometres (6,376.986 sq mi) as of 2018. The elevation above sea level is about 231 metres (758 ft).

== Climate ==
The Köppen climate type is Aw : Tropical savanna climate. The average annual temperature is 27 °C (81 °F). The average annual rainfall is 2,024 millimetres (79.7 in).

Cocalinho, Mato Grosso

Climate chart (precipitation, max. and min. temperature)
J	F	M	A	M	J	J	A	S	O	N	D
403 27 24	320 26 24	259 27 24	96 29 23	29 30 21	11 31 18	2 32 18	2 37 18	62 40 20	123 39 22	309 33 21	407 30 24
- █ Average max. and min. temperatures in °C
- █ Precipitation totals in mm
Imperial conversion
J	F	M	A	M	J	J	A	S	O	N	D
16 81 75	13 79 75	10 81 75	3.8 84 73	1.1 86 70	0.4 88 64	0.1 90 64	0.1 99 64	2.4 104 68	4.8 102 72	12 91 70	16 86 75
- █ Average max. and min. temperatures in °F
- █ Precipitation totals in inches

== Demographics ==
The population in the 2010 census was 5490. The estimated population as of 2020 was 5,681. Population density as of 2010 was 0.33 inhabitants per square kilometre (0.85/sq mi). As of 2010, 90.4% of the population had attended school between the ages of 6 and 14. Also as of 2010, the municipal Human Development Index was 0.660. This compares to 0.328 in 1991 and 0.500 in 2000.

On the 2010 census religion was reported as Catholic by 3,449 people, Evangelical by 1,207 people and Animism by 19 people.

In 2017, the average monthly salary was 2.3 minimum wages. Employed people were 17.3% of the total population. Households with monthly income of up to half a minimum wage per person represent 37.1% of the population. Recent estimates of GDP per capita:

== Health and sanitation ==
1.9% of households have adequate sanitation, 81% of urban households are on public roads with afforestation and 0.3% of urban households are on public roads with adequate urbanization (presence of manhole, sidewalk, pavement and curb). Annual hospitalizations due to diarrhea are 6.1 per 1,000 inhabitants. Deaths per 1,000 live births:

== Municipal finances ==
Recent figures for committed municipal expenditure:

Recent figures for realized municipal revenue:

== Sources ==
- Brasil / Mato Grosso / Cocalinho, IBGE
- "Cocalinho", Geonames
- Cocalinho, Brazilian Institute of Geography and Statistics
- "Cocalinho, Cocalinho, Brazil", Mindat
- NASA Earth Observations Data Set Index, NASA, archived from the original on 11 May 2020
- NASA Earth Observations: Rainfall (1 month - TRMM), NASA/Tropical Rainfall Monitoring Mission
