= Godofredo Viana =

Coordinates: 1.40278°S 45.78°W

- Municipality
- Interactive map of Godofredo Viana
- Country: Brazil
- Region: Nordeste
- State: Maranhão
- Mesoregion: Oeste Maranhense

Population (2020)
  - Total: 11,963
- Time zone: UTC−3 (BRT)

Godofredo Viana is a municipality in the state of Maranhão in the Northeast region of Brazil.

== See also ==
- List of municipalities in Maranhão
