= São Carlos do Ivaí =

Coordinates: 23°17′S 52°30′W

- Municipality
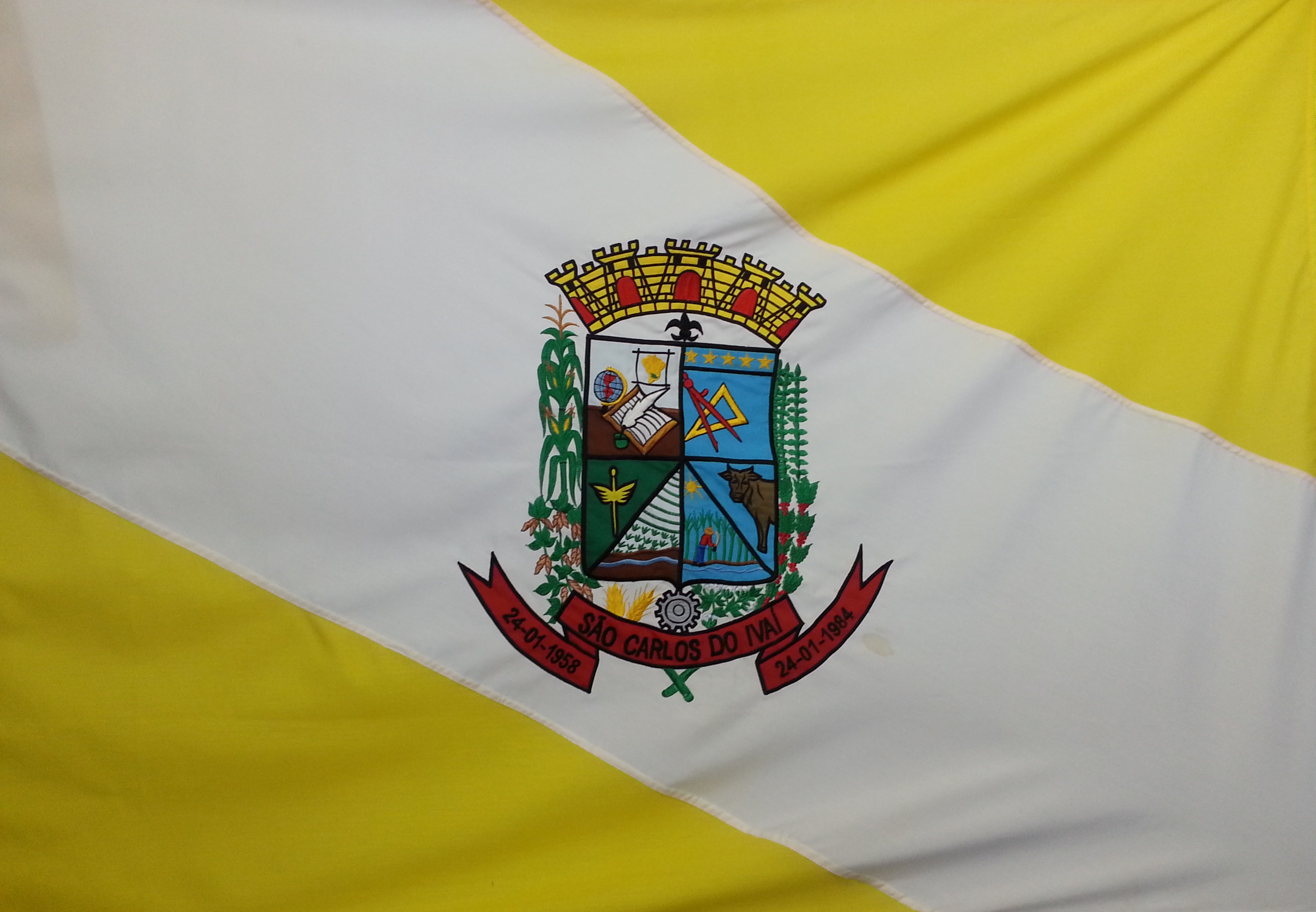
- Flag Coat of arms
- Interactive map of São Carlos do Ivaí
- Country: Brazil
- Region: Southern
- State: Paraná
- Mesoregion: Noroeste Paranaense

Population (2020)
  - Total: 6,920
- Time zone: UTC−3 (BRT)

São Carlos do Ivaí is a municipality in the state of Paraná in the Southern Region of Brazil.

== See also ==
- List of municipalities in Paraná
