= Canarana =

Municipality of Bahia State, Brazil

- Municipality
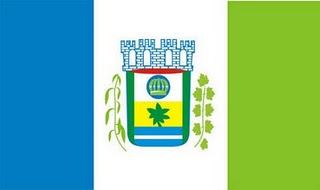
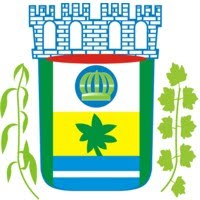
- Flag Coat of arms

- Location in Brazil
- Coordinates: 11°41′06″S 41°46′08″W
- Country: Brazil
- Region: Nordeste
- State: Bahia

Population (2020)
  - Total: 26,325
- Time zone: UTC−3 (BRT)

Canarana is a municipality in the state of Bahia in the North-East region of Brazil.

== See also ==
- List of municipalities in Bahia
