= Santa Terezinha, Mato Grosso =

Santa Terezinha
- Municipality
- The Municipality of Santa Terezinha
- Location of Santa Terezinha
- Coordinates: 10°28′12″S 50°30′10″W
- Country: Brazil
- Region: Central-West
- State: Mato Grosso

Government
  - Mayor: Olivan Ferreira Trindade

Area
  - Total: 6,450,838 km^{2} (2,490,682 sq mi)
- Elevation: 198 m (650 ft)

Population (2020)
  - Total: 8,460
  - Density: 1/km^{2} (2.6/sq mi)
- Time zone: UTC−4 (AMT)
- HDI (2000): 0.665 – medium

Santa Terezinha is the easternmost municipality in the Brazilian state of Mato Grosso.

The city is served by Santa Terezinha Airport.
