= Santa Terezinha Airport =

Santa Terezinha Airport Aeroporto de Santa Terezinha
- IATA: STZ; ICAO: SWST

Summary
- Airport type: Public
- Serves: Santa Terezinha
- Closed: 2019 (temporarily)
- Time zone: BRT−1 (UTC−04:00)
- Elevation AMSL: 202 m (663 ft)
- Coordinates: 10°27′53″S 50°31′7″W

Map
- Location in Brazil

Runways
Direction	Length		Surface
Direction	m	ft	Surface
08/26	1,500	4,921	Gravel
- Sources: ANAC

Santa Terezinha Airport (IATA: STZ, ICAO: SWST) is the airport serving Santa Terezinha, Brazil. It was closed in 2019.

== History ==
On September 12, 2019 the operational license of the facility was revoked.

== Access ==
The airport is located 1 km (1 mi) northwest from downtown Santa Terezinha.

== See also ==
- List of airports in Brazil
