= Pedra Preta =

Coordinates: 16°37′22″S 54°28′26″W

- Municipality
- Flag Coat of arms

- Country: Brazil
- Region: Center-West
- State: Mato Grosso
- Mesoregion: Sudeste Mato-Grossense

Population (2020)
  - Total: 17,446
- Time zone: UTC−3 (BRT)

Pedra Preta is a municipality in the state of Mato Grosso in the Central-West Region of Brazil.

== See also ==
- List of municipalities in Mato Grosso
