= Porto Esperidião =

Coordinates: 15°51′S 58°28′W

- Municipality
- Location in Mato Grosso
- Country: Brazil
- Region: Center-West
- State: Mato Grosso
- Mesoregion: Sudoeste Mato-Grossense

Area (2015)
  - Total: 2.243195 sq mi (5.809848 km^{2})

Population (2020)
  - Total: 12,097
- Time zone: UTC−4 (AMT)

Porto Esperidião is a municipality in the state of Mato Grosso in the Central-West Region of Brazil.

The municipality contains 27% of the 120,092 hectares (296,750 acres) Serra de Santa Bárbara State Park, created in 1997.

== See also ==
- List of municipalities in Mato Grosso
