= Araçás =

Municipality of Bahia, Brazil

- Municipality
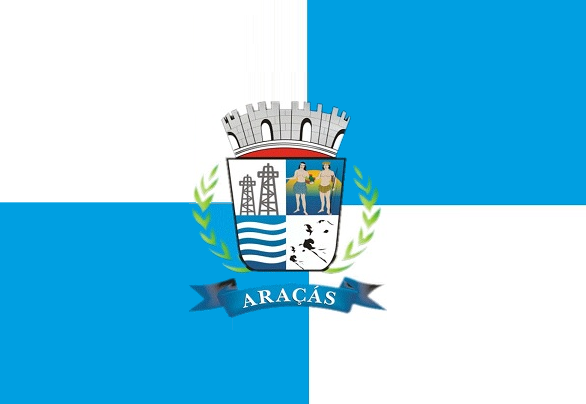
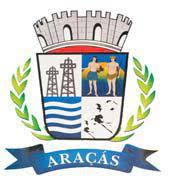
- Flag Coat of arms

- Location in Brazil
- Coordinates: 12°13′12″S 38°12′10″W
- Country: Brazil
- Region: Nordeste
- State: Bahia

Government
  - Mayor: Maria das Graças Trindade Leal (PT)
  - Deputy Mayor: Joselito Soares Barros (PSB)

Population (2020)
  - Total: 12,208
- Time zone: UTC−3 (BRT)

Araçás is a municipality in the state of Bahia in the North-East region of Brazil.

== See also ==
- List of municipalities in Bahia
