= Monkey Mountain =

Monkey Mountain can refer to:

- Monkey Mountain, Missouri, United States, a mountain
- Monkey Mountain Conservation Area, a park in Holt County, Missouri
- Monkey Mountain, Guyana, a village
  - Monkey Mountain Airport
- Monkey Mountain Facility, a former United States Air Force and Marine base on Sơn Trà Mountain, east of Da Nang, Vietnam
- Shoushan (Xingcheng) (English: Monkey Mountain), a mountain in China
- Shoushan (Kaohsiung), a mountain in Kaohsiung, Taiwan
- Sơn Trà Mountain (English: Monkey Mountain), a mountain in Vietnam
