= Kato, Guyana =

Kato
- Village
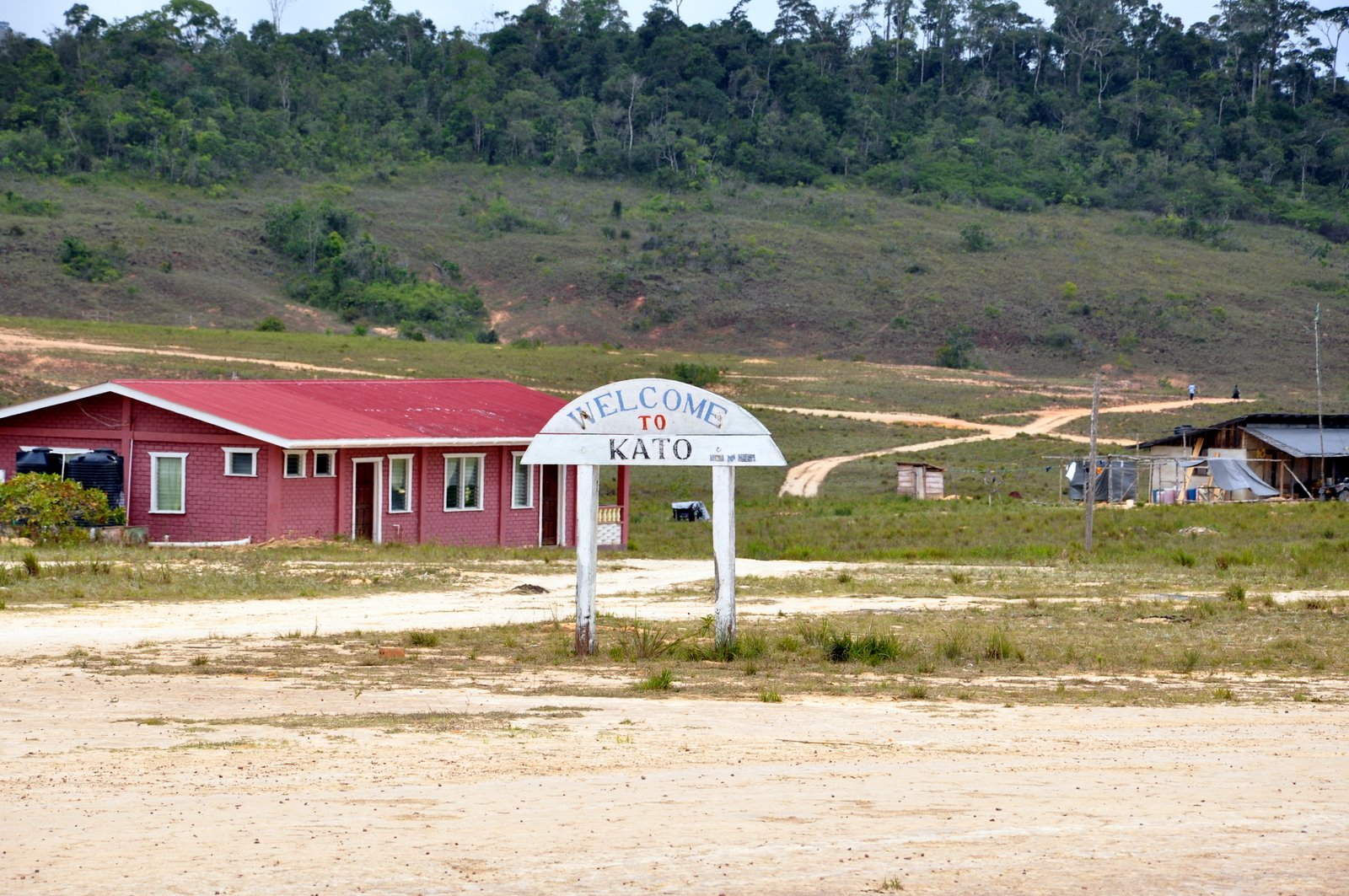

- Location in Guyana
- Coordinates: 4.6551°N 59.8227°W
- Country: Guyana
- Region: Potaro-Siparuni

Government
  - Toshao: Clifton Ferreira

Area
  - Total: 250 km^{2} (97 sq mi)

Population (2012)
  - Total: 424

Kato is an Indigenous village in the Potaro-Siparuni Region of Guyana. The village is mainly inhabited by Patamona people. The village is located in the Pacaraima Mountains.

== Overview ==
The economy of the village is based on farming and gathering semi precious stones which are turned into jewelry at the Monkey Mountain lapidary.

The village has a primary and a secondary school. Kato has access to internet. The nearest hospital is located in Mahdia which can only be accessed by plane. A hydroelectric plant is under construction on the waterfalls of the nearby Chiung River and will provide electricity for Kato and neighbouring Paramakatoi.

== Transport ==
There is an unpaved road between Karasabai and Kato. Kato is served by Kato Airport.
