= Pyrenula infrastroidea =

Scientific classification
- Kingdom: Fungi
- Division: Ascomycota
- Class: Eurotiomycetes
- Order: Pyrenulales
- Family: Pyrenulaceae
- Genus: Pyrenula
- Species: P. infrastroidea

Binomial name
- Pyrenula infrastroidea Aptroot & Sipman (2013)
- Holotype: Potaro-Siparuni, Guyana

Synonyms
- Pyrenula subvariabilis Aptroot & Sipman (2018)

Species of lichen-forming fungus

Pyrenula infrastroidea is a species of corticolous (bark-dwelling) crustose lichen in the family Pyrenulaceae. The species forms a relatively thick yellowish-gray crust on bark and produces fruiting bodies that are mostly immersed in the thallus, typically occurring in clusters of three to six with fused openings. It is characterized by ascospores that are divided by several cross-walls and occasional lengthwise walls into rounded compartments. The lichen is known only from the Potaro-Siparuni region of Guyana, where it grows on smooth-barked canopy branches in forests and savanna woodlands at elevations around 800 m (2,600 ft).

== Taxonomy ==
This species was described as new by André Aptroot and Harrie Sipman in 2013. The holotype was collected in Guyana (Potaro-Siparuni, near Paramakatoi), where it grew as an epiphyte on canopy branches of a felled tree. The authors noted its resemblance to P. astroidea but separated it on account of differences in ascospore size.

In 2023 Sipman re-examined the type material and concluded that Pyrenula subvariabilis, described in 2018, represents the same species. A comparison of the original descriptions and the two type specimens showed that the supposed difference in the presence of crystal pockets in the thallus is an artifact: the holotype of P. infrastroidea has a few pale spots that are probably soredia from another lichen or other impurities, while the isotype (duplicate), labeled as the type of P. subvariabilis, lacks such structures. Because both types are fragments of the same thallus, he treated P. subvariabilis as a later synonym of P. infrastroidea and recorded ascospore dimensions of 14–15(–17) by 8 μm.

== Description ==
This species has a relatively thick, oily thallus that is yellowish gray and bears minute pseudocyphellae but no border. The perithecia are mostly immersed in the thallus and are nearly spherical, 0.4–0.7 mm in diameter. They commonly occur in clusters of three to six whose lateral walls and pores fuse, giving the cluster a common set of openings. Those openings are yellowish brown. The hamathecium is clear and devoid of oil droplets. Each ascus bears eight spores arranged in two irregular rows. The spores are muriform, meaning they have several transverse and occasional longitudinal septa, and their internal cavities (lumina) are rounded with a thickened inner wall at the tips. Sipman measured the ascospores in the type material as 14–15(–17) μm long by about 8 μm wide.

== Habitat and distribution ==
Pyrenula infrastroidea is so far known only from the Potaro–Siparuni Region of Guyana. The type specimen was collected near Paramakatoi village at about 800 m elevation, in forest along a trail to Kawatipu, where the lichen grew epiphytically on canopy branches of a felled tree. Material later described as P. subvariabilis, now regarded as a synonym, was found on smooth-barked canopy branches in savanna woodland near Pakaraima Village at a similar elevation.

== See also ==
- List of Pyrenula species
