= Princeville, Guyana =

Princeville
- Village
- Location in Guayana
- Coordinates: 5.31621°N 59.20254°W
- Country: Guyana
- Region: Potaro-Siparuni

Population (2019)
  - Total: >100

Princeville is an Amerindian community in the Potaro-Siparuni Region of Guyana.

The location used to be called Kangaruma Junction, but was renamed after Alan Prince, its founder. The village is a satellite of and managed by the Village Captain and Councilors of Campbelltown.

== Economic activity ==
Most of the residents are Patamona or Wapishana people. Mining and farming are the main economic activities.

== Public services ==
Princeville has a health hut, served by a community health worker. It has a primary school and secondary schooling is done in Mahdia. The village has a few small shops. The village lacks electricity, residents use privately owned generators.
