= Daniel Whyte (soccer) =

Canadian-Guyanaese soccer player

Personal information
- Date of birth: November 18, 1994 (age 31)
- Place of birth: Mississauga, Ontario, Canada
- Height: 1.78 m (5 ft 10 in)
- Position: Defender

Youth career
- Sigma FC

Senior career*
Years	Team	Apps	(Gls)
2015–2016	Morvant Caledonia United		
2016	Sigma FC	13	(0)
2017–2019	North Mississauga SC	29	(0)

International career^{‡}
2015	Guyana U23		
2015–2016	Guyana	2	(0)
- * Club domestic league appearances and goals as of December 31, 2021 ‡ National team caps and goals as of December 31, 2021

Daniel Whyte (born November 18, 1994) is a soccer player. Born in Mississauga, Ontario, he represented Guyana internationally.

== Career ==
=== Club ===
In 2015, he joined Trinidad & Tobago club Morvant Caledonia United.

In 2016, he played in League1 Ontario with Sigma FC.

From 2017 to 2019, he played with North Mississauga SC.

In 2018, he participated in the Open Trials for the new Canadian Premier League, being one of the 56 players of the over 200 participants who were invited to the second trial.

=== International ===
In January 2015, he made contact with Faizal Khan, a national team recruiter for the Guyana national team, who gave him an opportunity to try out for the team.

He first played with the Guyana U23 team, making his debut against St Lucia U23 in a friendly, followed by participating in Olympic qualifying. Afterwards, he earned call-ups to the senior team for World Cup qualifying. In 2016, he played in a friendly with the senior squad against the Canada U23, his birth nation.

== Personal ==
His father hails from Campbellville, Guyana. His brother, Anthony Whyte, also played for the Guyana national team.
