= Patamona people =

Indigenous people to the mountains of Guyana and Northern Brazil

Patamona
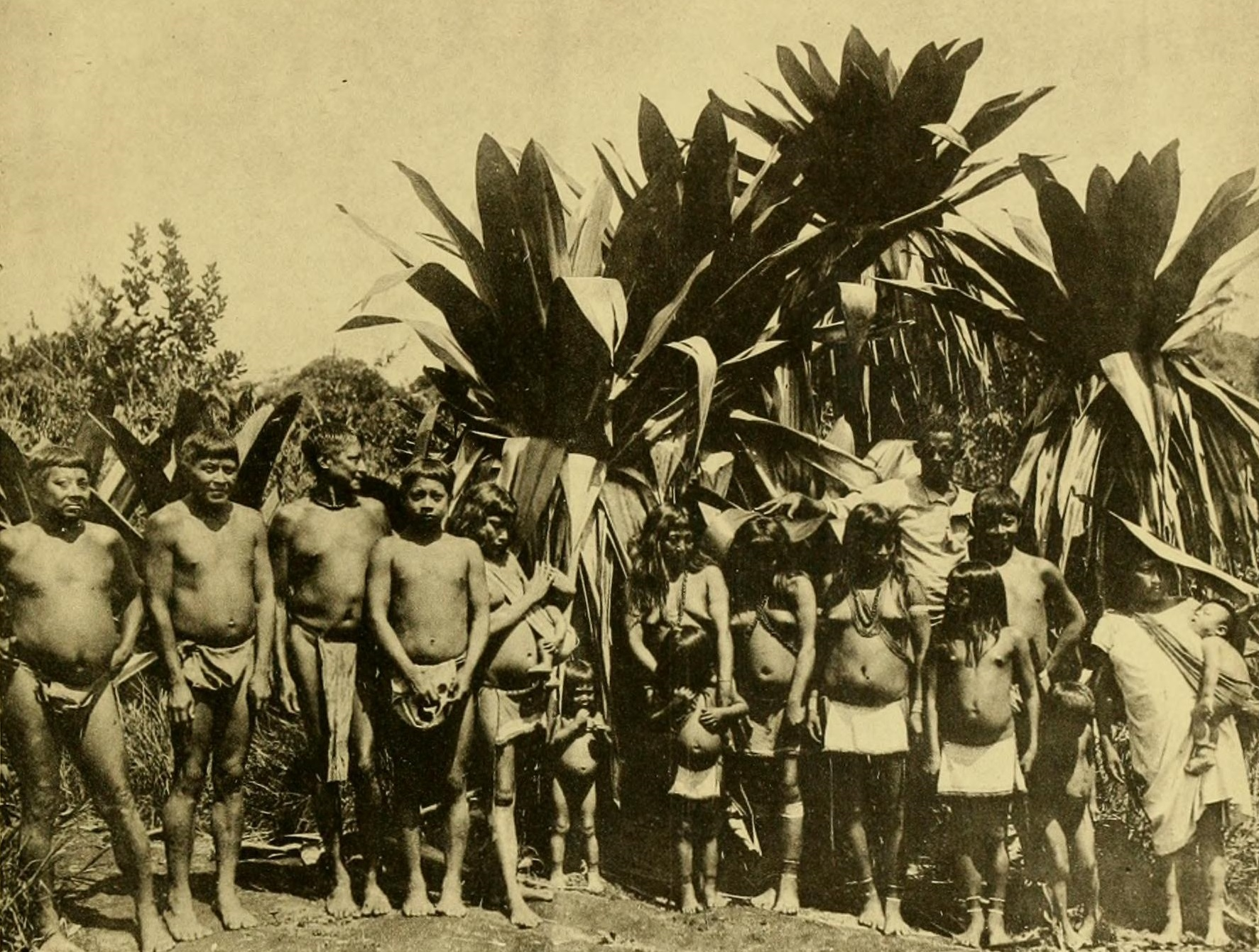
- Patamona people, 1908 or earlier

Total population
- c. 5,698 (1990)

Regions with significant populations
- Guyana, Brazil
- Guyana: c. 5,500 (1990)
- Roraima (Brazil): 198 (2014)

Languages
- Patamona language

Religion
- Traditional

Related ethnic groups
- Akawaio and Pemon

The Patamona are an Amerindian people native to the Pakaraima Mountains of Guyana and northern Brazil. They speak a Cariban language, Kapóng, and have often been referred to interchangeably as Akawaio or Ingariko. Patamona are considered a sub-group of Kapon people.

There are about 5,000 living members of this and closely related ethnic groups in Guyana. A 1990 population estimate for Guyana was 5500. According to FUNASA, Brazil had 120 Patamona in 2010. They were recognized as a distinct ethnic group in Brazil since 2005.

== History ==
Pottery was traded for cassava graters made by other Carib groups up until the 20th century.

The region was exploited until recently for suitable farm lands, hunting and fishing. The Patamona were not contacted until the early 19th century.

To this day, the Patamona people call themselves the People of the Heavens, whose remnants of their culture survive in Paramakatoi, as well as nearby Kaieteur Falls.

== Villages ==
Location of the Patamona settlements on the map of Guyana.

In Guyana, residents of Paramakatoi and some other villages are literate in English and Patamona. Other villages with Patamona populations include Campbelltown, Micobie, Monkey Mountain, Princeville, and Kato.

Orinduik is a Patamona village along the Maú River.

In Brazil, the Patamona have a minority presence in Raposa Serra do Sol.

== Culture ==
Kaieteur Falls is an important cultural site for the Patamona people. Kaieteur Falls has been named after Old Kaie, a member of the Patamona tribe. In their animist religion the Patamona believe in Knaima, a spirit that possesses people and turns them into evil beings.

Common agricultural products include bitter cassava, yam, sweet potato, sugarcane, chili pepper, squash. Bitter cassava is used to make kasiri and pajuaru. Kasiri is a lightly fermented cassava drink consumed at breakfast, while pajuaru has a longer fermentation and is a festive drink. Fish are often eaten, and can be dry smoked.

Culinary practices are similar to other Indigenous people of the region, including preparation of the Guyanese pepperpot, called tuma in Patamona. Food is also steamed by packaging them in leaves and setting them beside a fire. They also gather wild mushrooms for consumption, including amanita perphaea (or pulutukwe), Cookeina (agubana), Lentinula boryana (kapiokwok) and certain clavulina also known as kunmudlutse and tepurumeng.
