= Micobie =

- Village
- Location in Guyana
- Coordinates: 5.3651°N 59.0131°W
- Country: Guyana
- Region: Potaro-Siparuni

Government
  - Toshao: Cleveland Henry

Area
  - Total: 24 sq mi (62 km^{2})

Population (2012)
  - Total: 360

Micobie (also: Maicobi and Cassava Hill) is a village in Potaro-Siparuni, Guyana, on the right bank of the Potaro River near Tumatumari.

== History ==
The village was established in the 19th century. During the construction of the Denham Suspension Bridge, workers of the bridge bought their bread from the village, hence the name Cassava Hill. Most villagers used to live near Tumatumari, however due to the mining operations and the destruction of the beach, the villagers moved uphill in the 1970s.

In the Official Gazette of Guyana the village was misspelt Micobie which is the current name. The village of El Paso is a satellite of Micobie located down the hill.

== Demographics ==
The population of the village is 360 as 2012 including El Paso. The inhabitants are Amerindians including members of the Macushi, Carib and Patamona tribes, who have maintained much of their culture without any racial integration.

== Administration ==
Micobie is managed by a Village Captain, a Vice Captain and six councilors.

== Economy ==
The main economic activities are subsistence farming and the production of legumes for sale in neighbouring communities.

== Facilities ==
The village has two shops and a primary school.

== Transport ==
Access to the village is via the Potaro River, or via the road from Linden/Mabura and Bartica/Potaro.
