= Peter Cullen (disambiguation) =

Peter Cullen (1941–2026) was a Canadian voice actor.

Peter Cullen may also refer to:

- Peter Cullen (athlete) (1932–2010), British athlete
- Peter Cullen (scientist) (1943–2008), Australian water scientist
- Peter Cullen (1941-), New Zealand voice actor

== See also ==
- List of people with given name Peter
- Cullen (surname)
