= Hugh Possingham =

Conservation biologist (born 1962)

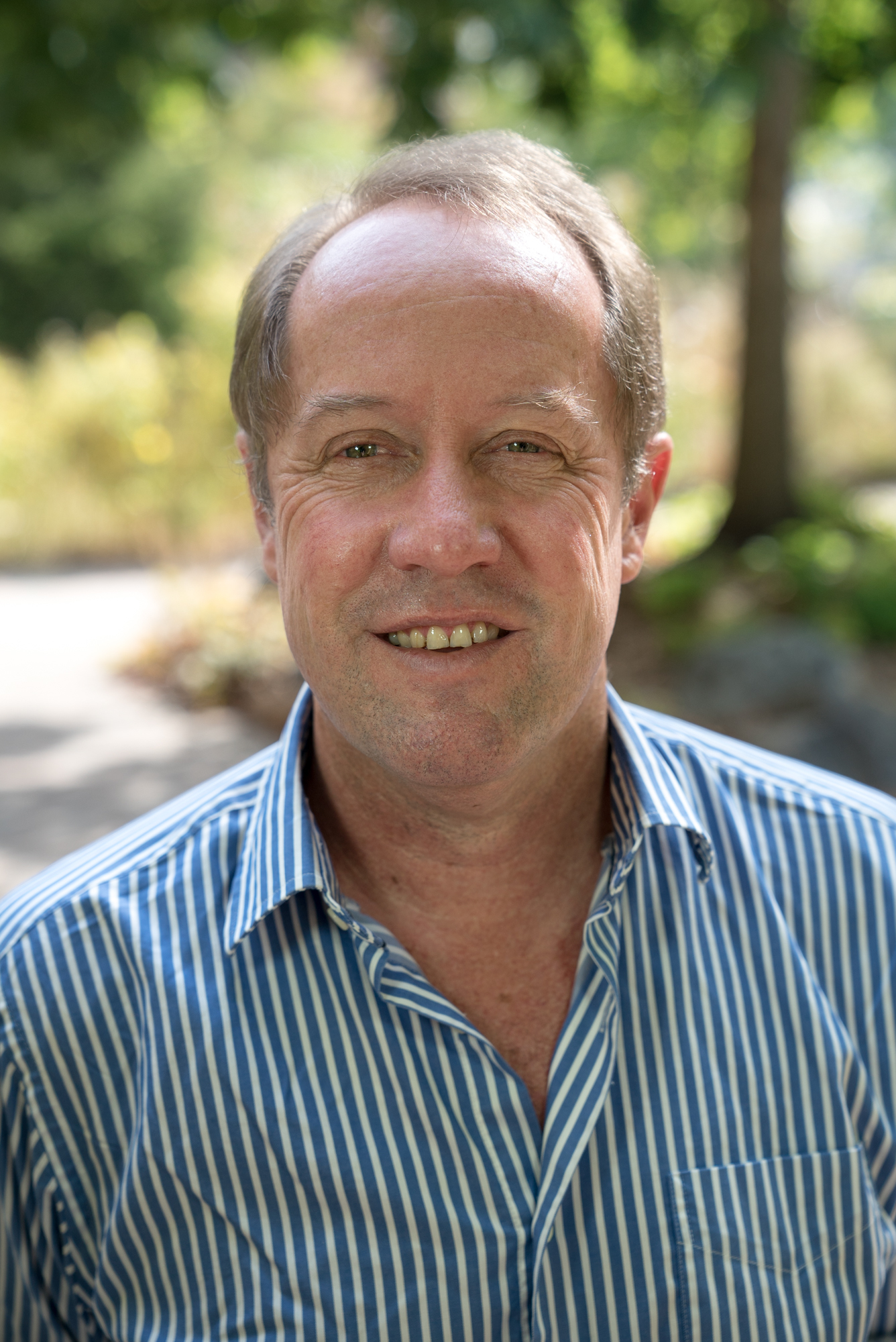
- Hugh Possingham in 2020
- Born: Hugh Phillip Possingham; 21 July 1962 (age 64); Adelaide, Australia
- Education: University of Adelaide (BS); Oxford University (D. Phil)
- Awards: Australian Laureate Fellowship (2013)
- Scientific career
- Fields: Conservation biology; Ecology
- Workplaces: Stanford University; University of Adelaide; Australian National University; The University of Queensland; The Nature Conservancy; Queensland Government
- Doctoral advisor: Michael Bulmer
- Website: biological-sciences.uq.edu.au/profile/339/hugh-possingham

Hugh Phillip Possingham (born 21 July 1962) is an Australian scientist, best known for his work in conservation biology, applied ecology, and population ecology. He is the former Queensland Chief Scientist, and is a professor at the School of the Environment at The University of Queensland.

== Early life and education ==
Hugh Phillip Possingham was born on 21 July 1962 in Adelaide, South Australia.

He attended St Peter's College, Adelaide from 1968 to 1979. The following year he enrolled at the University of Adelaide, graduating with a B.Sc. (Hons.) 1st class in applied mathematics in 1983, with a second major in biochemistry. From 1984 to 1987 he undertook a D.Phil. at St John's College, Oxford University under Michael Bulmer, on a Rhodes Scholarship. His thesis, titled "A model of resource renewal and depletion" focused on optimal foraging theory,

== Career ==
Possingham's first postdoctoral position was with Joan Roughgarden at Stanford University, working on the recruitment dynamics of intertidal communities. He then returned to Australia on a QEII Fellowship at the Australian National University, and undertook research on applications of population viability analysis to conservation biology. He moved to the University of Adelaide, first as a lecturer, then in 1995 as a professor.

In 2000 Possingham moved to a chair in the departments of Mathematics and Biological Sciences at the University of Queensland in Brisbane, where he was an ARC Professorial, Federation, and Laureate Fellow. He was director of the Australian Research Council Centre of Excellence for Environmental Decisions, and the Australian Government's Threatened Species Recovery Hub.

In 2014 he was appointed by the New South Wales Government under Mike Baird to the independent Biodiversity Legislation Review Panel, set up to review current NSW biodiversity conservation legislation, and publish a report with recommendations for reform. The panel presented its final report to the Minister for the Environment on 18 December 2014, containing 43 recommendations. In June 2016, Possingham, as one of the Wentworth Group of Concerned Scientists, signed a submission to the government protesting the legislation that had been drafted based on the report. Possingham quit the panel in protest in early November 2016, saying that the advice of the four experts had been ignored, and the proposed legislation could contribute to the extinction of species owing to lax rules about the amount of land that farmers could clear "without having to find equivalent areas of offsets to preserve biodiversity". The legislation was enacted as the Biodiversity Conservation Act 2016, but a subsequent review in 2023 ("the Henry review" was highly critical, and some key reforms were made to the Act.

In 2016 he joined The Nature Conservancy as its chief scientist. In September 2020 he was appointed the Queensland Chief Scientist, a role he held until his resignation on 31 August 2022.

As of May 2021, Possingham had published over 650 peer-reviewed papers, and supervised many doctoral and postdoctoral researchers. He co-developed the Marxan software for systematic conservation planning, which is considered "the most significant contribution to conservation biology to emerge from Australia's research community". It has been used to plan terrestrial and marine protected area networks for 5% of the Earth's surface, including Australia's Great Barrier Reef.

Possingham was the Queensland Chief Scientist from 2020 to 2022, where he provided high-level strategic science, research and innovation advice to the Queensland Government and acted as an ambassador for science in Queensland.

== Other roles and memberships ==
Possingham has had a great number of roles outside of his academic and full-time government appointments. He has chaired the federal government Biological Diversity Advisory Committee and been a member of the Natural Heritage Trust Advisory Committee, Queensland's Ministerial Advisory Committee on Vegetation Management, the Research and Conservation Committee of Birds Australia, and on the Greening Australia board in Queensland.

Possingham is a member of the Wentworth Group of Concerned Scientists, chaired the Australian Government's committees on Biodiversity Hotspots, and on Biological Diversity, the Queensland Government's Smart State Council, and the Wilderness Society's Wild Country Science Council.

Possingham co-authored "The Brigalow Declaration" with Barry Traill, used by Queensland Premier Beattie to support an end to land-clearing in Queensland. Land clearance in Queensland was removing 500,000 hectares of native vegetation each year, and was responsible for 10% of Australia's greenhouse gas emissions; its cessation enabled Australia to meet its Kyoto Protocol target.

In 2009 he proposed devoting a proportionate fraction of gambling revenues to saving an endangered species, to be selected by a random drawing shown on television before the Melbourne Cup.

From 2016 to 2020, Possingham was the Chief Scientist of The Nature Conservancy, a global conservation organisation with 400 scientists and 4000 staff, that has protected more than 40 million hectares of land and thousands of kilometres of rivers worldwide.

== Recognition and awards ==
Possingham won the Australian Mathematical Society Medal, the inaugural Fenner Medal for plant and animal biology from the Australian Academy of Science, and the 1999 and 2009 Eureka Prizes for Environmental Research. In 2016 he was awarded the Mahathir Science Award for Tropical Natural Resources, alongside Kerrie Wilson and Eric Meijard.

He was elected to the Australian Academy of Science in 2005. In 2013, Possigham was the first Australian to be elected a fellow of the Ecological Society of America, and in 2016 he was elected a foreign associate of the USA National Academy of Sciences. He was elected a Fellow of the Royal Society in 2025.

== Personal life ==
Possingham married Karen Anne Fiegert in 1985, and they have two children.

== Selected bibliography ==
- "Recruitment dynamics in complex life cycles". Roughgarden J, Gaines SD & Possingham HP. Science (1988) 241:1460-1466.
- "Limits to the use of threatened species lists". Possingham HP. et al. (2002) Trends in Ecology and Evolution 17:503-507.
- "Prioritising global conservation efforts". Wilson KA, McBride M, Bode M & Possingham HP. Nature (2006) 440:337-340.
- "Active adaptive management conservation". McCarthy M & Possingham HP. Conservation Biology (2007) 21:956-963.
- "Optimal allocation of resources among threatened species". Joseph L, Maloney R & Possingham HP. Conservation Biology (2009) 23:328-338.
- "Six common mistakes in conservation priority setting". Game E, Kareiva P & Possingham HP. Conservation Letters (2013) 27:480-485.
- "Optimal conservation outcomes require both restoration and protection". Possingham HP, Bode M, Klein CK. PLOS Biology (2015) e1002052.
