= Anthony Whyte (soccer) =

Canadian-Guyanese soccer player

Personal information
- Date of birth: March 10, 1996 (age 30)
- Place of birth: Mississauga, Ontario, Canada
- Height: 6 ft 1 in (1.85 m)
- Position: Goalkeeper

Youth career
- Sigma FC

College career
Years	Team	Apps	(Gls)
2014	Florida Southern Moccasins	3	(0)

Senior career*
Years	Team	Apps	(Gls)
2015–2016	Morvant Caledonia United		
2016	Sigma FC	0	(0)
2017	North Mississauga SC	6	(0)

International career^{‡}
2015	Guyana U23		
2015–2016	Guyana	3	(0)
- * Club domestic league appearances and goals as of December 31, 2021 ‡ National team caps and goals as of December 31, 2021

Anthony Whyte (born March 10, 1996) is a soccer player. Born in Canada, he represented Guyana internationally.

== Early life ==
He played youth soccer with Sigma FC, winning various youth titles. He trained and played in Holland for two years.

In 2014, he played college soccer with the Florida Southern Moccasins.

== Club career ==
In 2015, he joined Trinidad & Tobago club Morvant Caledonia United.

In 2016, he was on the roster for League1 Ontario club Sigma FC, but did not make any appearances.

In 2017, he played with North Mississauga SC.

== International career ==
In January 2015, he made contact with Faizal Khan, a national team recruiter for the Guyana national team, who gave him an opportunity to try out for the team, after being introduced by Jamaal Smith, another Canadian-born Guyanese national team player.

He played with the Guyana U23 team participating in Olympic qualifying.

He made his senior debut on March 29, 2015, playing all 90 minutes and keeping a clean sheet in a 2–0 win over Grenada. Afterwards, he earned call-ups to the senior team for World Cup qualifying.

== Personal ==
His father hails from Campbellville, Guyana. His brother, Daniel Whyte, also played for the Guyana national team.
