= El Paso, Guyana =

El Paso
- Village
- Location in Guyana
- Coordinates: 5.3539°N 59.0095°W
- Country: Guyana
- Region: Potaro-Siparuni

Population (2020)
  - Total: <200

El Paso is a village in the Potaro-Siparuni Region of Guyana. The village is on the Potaro River to the west of Tumatumari Falls, and Tumatumari Landing.

There are approximately 40 households in this village. Its inhabitants are Amerindians from the Macushi, Akawaio and Wapishana tribes, and people of mixed race. The village of is a satellite of Micobie located uphill.

El Paso has a primary school and an Anglican church.The Humatumari Hydropower Station was built nearby in 1957, however it ceased operation in the 1980s, and the villagers have to rely on private generators and solar panels for electricity.
