= Orinduik Airport =

Airport serving Orinduik, Guyana

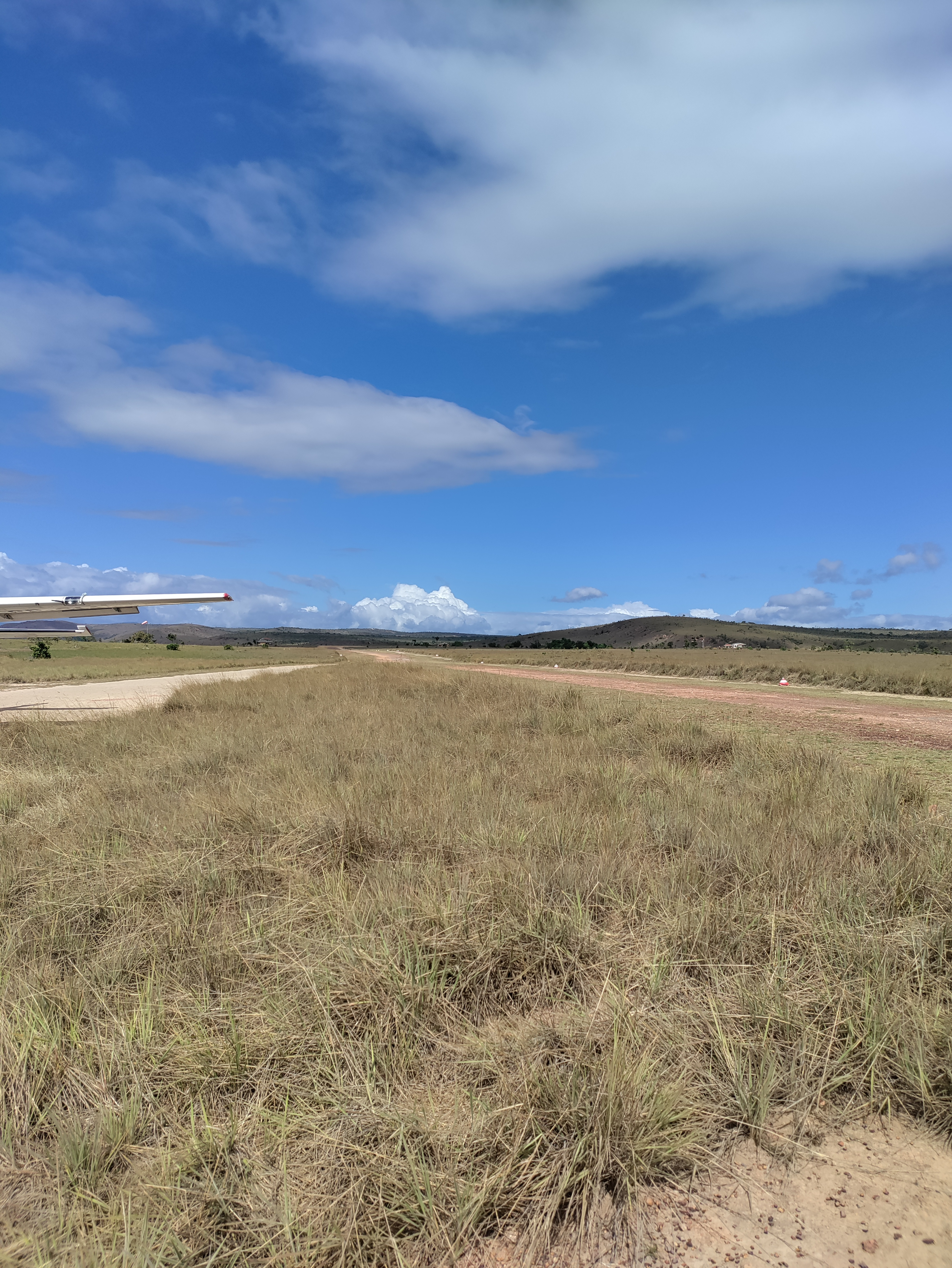
- Orinduik Airport in 2024
- IATA: ORJ; ICAO: SYOR

Summary
- Serves: Orinduik
- Elevation AMSL: 1,801 ft / 549 m
- Coordinates: 4°43′40″N 60°02′00″W

Map
- Location in Guyana

Runways
Direction	Length		Surface
Direction	m	ft	Surface
05/23	800	2,625	Gravel
- Sources: Bing Maps GCM

Orinduik Airport (IATA: ORJ, ICAO: SYOR) is an airport serving the mining community of Orinduik in the Potaro-Siparuni Region of Guyana.

== See also ==
- List of airports in Guyana
- Transport in Guyana
