= KTO =

KTO may refer to:

- KTO (TV channel), a French-language religious international television channel
- KTO Rosomak, a Polish military vehicle
- Korea Tourism Organization, South Korean government-owned tourism agency
- The Koreatown Oddity (KTO; born 1984), American rapper
- Kato Airport (IATA: KTO), in Guyana
- Kuot language (ISO 639-3: kto), spoken in Papua New Guinea
