= Paramakatoi Airport =

Airport in Guyana

- IATA: PMT; ICAO: SYPM

Summary
- Serves: Paramakatoi
- Elevation AMSL: 2,598 ft / 792 m
- Coordinates: 4°41′51″N 59°42′45″W

Map
- Location in Guyana

Runways
Direction	Length		Surface
Direction	m	ft	Surface
08/26	610	2,001	Grass

Paramakatoi Airport (IATA: PMT, ICAO: SYPM) is an airport serving the village of Paramakatoi, in the Potaro-Siparuni Region of Guyana.

As of 2020, Trans Guyana Airways offers weekly flights from Eugene F. Correia International Airport to Paramakatoi.

== See also ==
- List of airports in Guyana
- Transport in Guyana
