= 2023 Mahdia school fire =

2023 fire disaster in Mahdia, Guyana

- Date: 21 May 2023
- Location: Mahdia, Potaro-Siparuni, Guyana; 05°17′03″N 59°08′51″W
- Type: Fire
- Cause: Arson
- Deaths: 20
- Injuries: 29 (9 serious)
- Arrests: 1
- Charges: 20 counts of murder

On 21 May 2023, an arson attack took place at a dormitory of Mahdia Secondary School in Mahdia, Potaro-Siparuni, Guyana, killing at least 20 people. The fire was among the deadliest involving school dormitories in the last 30 years.

== Background ==
Mahdia Secondary School is a secondary school in the gold-mining town of Mahdia. The school serves students aged 12 to 18. Fifty-nine girls usually lived in the dormitory where the fire happened, but three of them were at home when the fire broke out. The majority of alumni are of Amerindian descent. A press release from the Amerindian Peoples Association stated that some of the students came from the indigenous communities of Micobia, Chenapou and Karisparu.

The facility is a boarding school. The school was of interest to the Guyanese government, having constructed the school to "bridge the gaps between the hinterland and coastal areas" and to better educate children in less developed parts of the country. The dorm was constructed out of concrete and wood, with five doors and grill windows. The dormitory's five doors were locked to keep students from sneaking out at night.

== Fire ==
On 21 May 2023, a fire erupted at a female dormitory minutes before midnight local time. The student who set the fire sprayed a substance into the air, then ignited it. The fire quickly travelled to mattresses just outside the bathroom. The fire was made worse by the fact that the dorm administrator was unable to locate her keys, due to a state of panic. Firefighters rescued about 20 students by breaking holes through one of the walls.

Heavy thunderstorms made it more difficult to fight the fire from the air and to fly injured children to other areas for treatment. The fire burned for three hours before it was controlled.

== Victims ==
The initial death toll was 20, with 14 dying in the dormitory, but it was eventually updated to 19, after a child initially reported as dead was resuscitated by rescuers. On 30 May, the girl who had been resuscitated died in a Georgetown hospital. The dorm administrator's five-year-old son was one of the victims who died in the dorm. Thirteen of the victims were burnt beyond recognition, and DNA samples were sent to the Mount Sinai laboratory in New York City, with the help of Barbados, to identify their remains.

Injured students were transported to the two major hospitals in Georgetown. A critically injured 13-year-old girl was flown to New York on 28 May for treatment at Northwell Health's Regional Burn Center at Staten Island University Hospital. By 30 May, she was in stable condition.

== Accused ==
According to officials, the fire was caused by a 15-year-old student who was enraged after her mobile phone was confiscated. The girl allegedly made threats following disciplinary action for her involvement with an older man. The teenage suspect, who was hospitalized with burn injuries, confessed to the arson. After authorities sought guidance on whether to press charges against her, they eventually received advice to charge her with 19 counts of murder. On 29 May, the girl was charged as an adult with 19 counts of murder. She appeared by video before a court in Georgetown; the court ordered that she be held at a juvenile holding centre until further proceedings take place. If she is found guilty, the suspect could be sentenced to life in prison. On 5 July, the charges were amended to 20 counts of murder.

== Investigation ==
A firefighter spokesperson indicated that the suspected point of origin was identified as being in the southwestern end of the building during a press conference the day after the fire. After their initial investigation was completed, the scene was to be turned over to the Mahdia police force for another investigation. Guyana's government accepted offers from the US to send forensic and other expert teams to help the investigation. The government sent specialists in DNA identification to help identify the remains of 13 victims.

The investigation found that the building did not have a proper water supply that firefighters could use, there were "inadequacies" with the firefighters and their equipment, five doors were locked, and many of the dormitory's windows had metal grills. Police said that the grills were meant to stop the girls from leaving the dorms to "socialize with miners who flash gold, diamonds and cash in attempts to groom girls for sexual favors". During the fire, dorm staff had been unable to find the keys for the doors.

== Reactions ==
President Irfaan Ali said: "This is a major disaster. It is horrible, it is painful." He also declared three days of national mourning. The opposition alliance APNU+AFC said it would seek a thorough investigation and thanked people in the community for helping authorities rescue trapped children. Opposition lawmaker Natasha Singh-Lewis said "We need to understand how this most horrific and deadly incident occurred and take all necessary measures to prevent such a tragedy from happening again in the future". Caribbean Community Secretary-General Carla Barnett sent condolences to the fire victims.

On 22 May, 50 relatives and friends of the victims demonstrated in Chenapou, a village that is close to Mahdia. They criticized the dormitory's barred windows and demanded justice and compensation. The same year, the government paid the parents of each victim GY$25,000.
