= Tumatumari Landing =

- Village
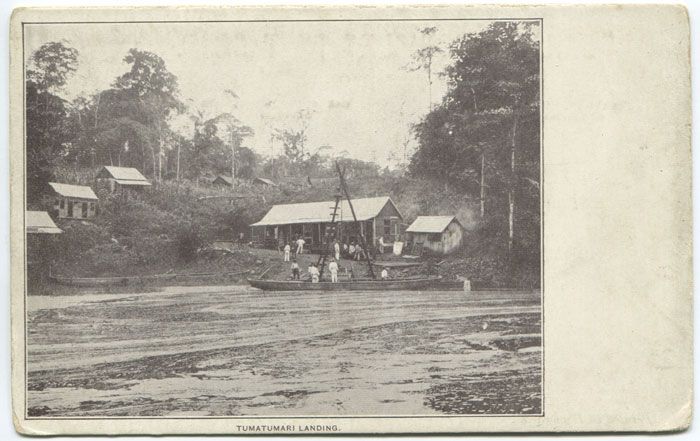
- Tumatumari Landing (circa 1908)

- Location in Guyana
- Coordinates: 5.316946°N 59.214552°W
- Country: Guyana
- Region: Potaro-Siparuni

Tumatumari Landing is a small community in the Potaro-Siparuni Region of Guyana, across the Potaro River from Tumatumari, near the Konawaruk Road, and to the east of El Paso.

The region used to be inhabited by Amerindians of the Arawak and Akawaio tribes, however the discovery of gold attracted many fortune seekers from Guyana and beyond. Tumatumari Landing serves as the harbour of the gold mining community of Tumatumari, because the region could only be reached by boat. Nowadays there are road connections to Linden/Mabura and Bartica/Potaro.

On 6 May 1900, Mabel, a river steamboat carrying 120 passengers and towing three boats, was scheduled to arrive at Tumatumari Landing, however the strong current was too much to handle, and the Mabel went over the Tumatumari Falls, killing 60 of her passengers.
