= Concerned Scientists =

Concerned Scientists may refer to:

- Union of Concerned Scientists
- Committee of Concerned Scientists
- Wentworth Group of Concerned Scientists
