= Kato Airport =

Airport in Guyana

- IATA: KTO; ICAO: SYKT

Summary
- Serves: Kato
- Elevation AMSL: 2,299 ft / 701 m
- Coordinates: 4°39′00″N 59°49′50″W

Map
- Location in Guyana

Runways
Direction	Length		Surface
Direction	m	ft	Surface
08/26	920	3,018	Gravel
- Sources: Bing Maps GCM

Kato Airport (IATA: KTO, ICAO: SYKT) is an airport serving the village of Kato, in the Potaro-Siparuni Region of Guyana. The gravel airstrip is 920 meters long.

The Kato non-directional beacon (Ident: KTO) is 1 kilometre (0.62 mi) east of the field.

== See also ==
- List of airports in Guyana
- Transport in Guyana
