= John Williams (water scientist) =

Australian scientist

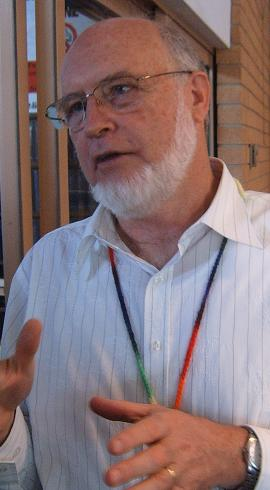
- Education: University of Sydney
- Scientific career
- Fields: Hydrology
- Workplaces: CSIRO; Australian National University; Natural Resources Commission; Charles Sturt University

John Williams is an Australian scientist whose life work has been in the study of hydrology and the use of water in the landscape and farming, including land salinity.

== Biography ==
Williams grew up near Tumbarumba on a farm in the Snowy Mountains region of New South Wales. He attended school in Queanbeyan near Canberra, before graduating from the University of Sydney with a degree in agricultural science and a doctorate in soil science and hydrology.

Williams is a founding member of the Wentworth Group of Concerned Scientists and advocated for a rational debate on Australia's water resources. He was Chief of the Division of Land and Water, CSIRO (Australia's premier government research organisation), in Canberra, when he retired in 2004. He served earlier at the CSIRO laboratories at Townsville in Queensland where, among other things, he studied the Great Artesian Basin and the transport of water from the Great Dividing Range into the outback of Queensland and New South Wales.

He also served as adjunct professor in Agriculture and Natural Resource Management at Charles Sturt University, and Chief Scientist and Chair of the NSW Department of Natural Resources’ Science and Information Board. Williams was also Commissioner of the New South Wales Natural Resources Commission between 2005 and 2011.

Williams is an emeritus professor and research associate at the Australian National University; and a commentator on environmental matters.

In a feature article in a July 2009 edition of The Canberra Times Williams reportedly stated that there should be a sixty percent cut in water use across the Murray-Darling Basin, and the Snowy Mountains Scheme that diverts water to the Riverina should not be exempt from water savings. In 2012, Williams was interviewed for commentary on the Murray-Darling Commission report.

During his career, Williams has been honoured with the 2005 Farrer Memorial Medal for achievement and excellence in agricultural science and appointed in November 2011 as a Fellow of the Australian Academy of Technological Sciences and Engineering (FTSE).

In February 2018, Williams was a co-author of an article in The Conversation and co-signatory of the Murray Darling Declaration along with other concerned scientists.

== See also ==
- Wentworth Group of Concerned Scientists
- Water security in Australia
