= Bruce Thom =

Australian geoscientist and educator

Bruce Graham Thom AM is an Australian geoscientist and educator. He is a founding member of the Wentworth Group of Concerned Scientists, Emeritus Professor at the University of Sydney in Australia and founding President of the Australian Coastal Society. Educated at The Scots College in Bellevue Hill, Sydney, Australia and the University of Sydney, where he served as Professor of Geography and Pro-Vice Chancellor (Research). He is also former Vice Chancellor of the University of New England and former Chair of the Australian State of the Environment Committee. Professor Thom has written widely in the areas of physical geography, coastal management, coastal policy, coastal geology, and geomorphology. He was made a member of the Order of Australia in 2010.

== List of honours ==
- Emeritus Professor, University of Sydney
- Former Chair, Coasts and Climate Change Council
- Former President, The Australian Coastal Society
- Former Chair, Australian State of the Environment Committee
- Former Chair, Current Member, NSW Coastal Council
- Former Vice Chancellor, University of New England
- Former Pro-Vice Chancellor, University of Sydney
- Honorary life member of Surfrider Foundation Australia
- Honorary life member of NSW Geographical Society
- Honorary member of the Sydney Coastal Councils Group
- Fellow, Academy of Technological Science and Engineering (FTSE)
- Fellow, Institute of Australian Geographers (FIAG)
- Honorary doctorate, University of Wollongong
