= Mike Young (economist) =

Australian economist and water policy expert

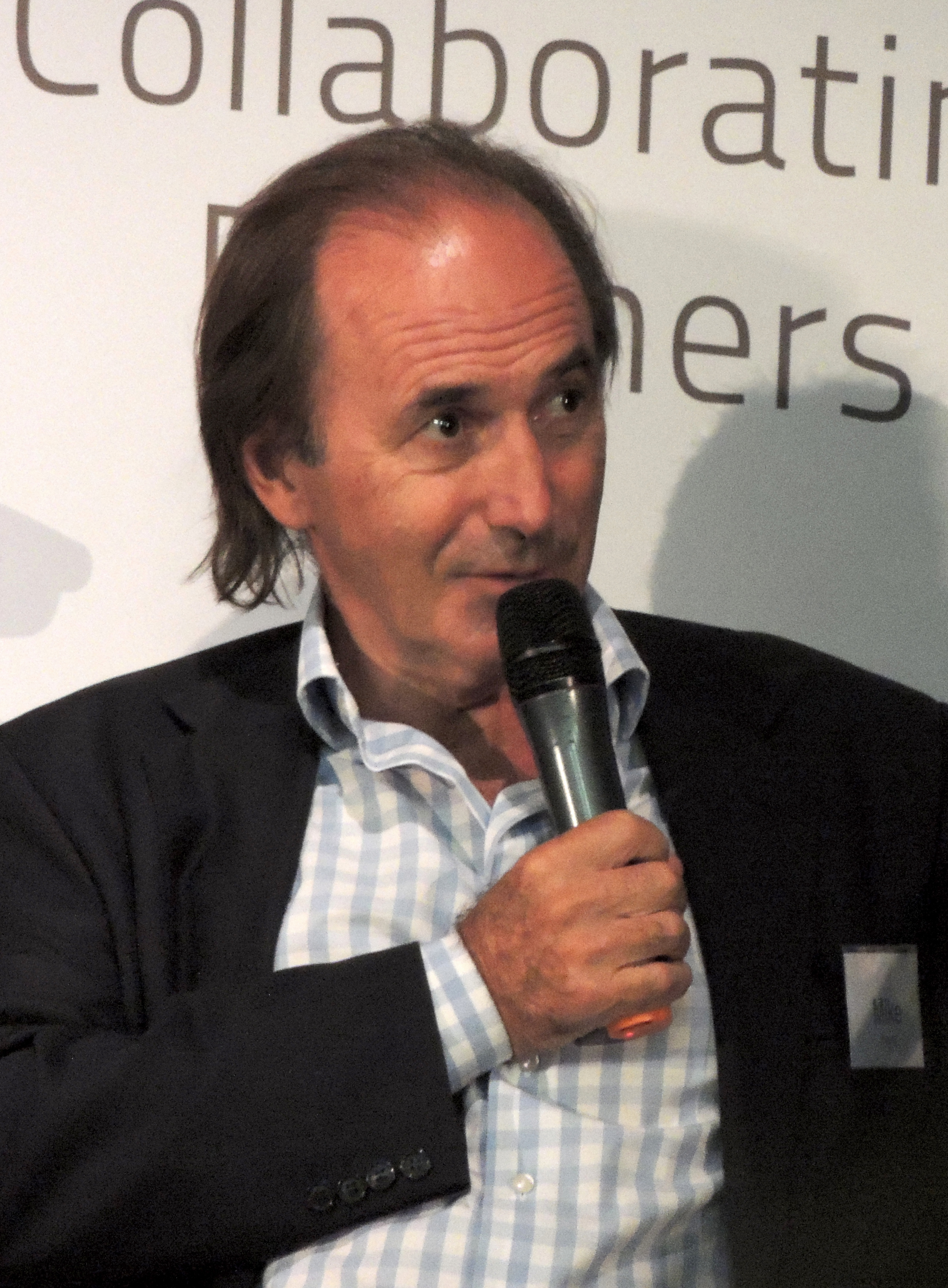
Mike Young at the University of Adelaide in 2014

Michael Denis Young AO FASSA is an Australian economist and water policy expert. He is best known for his work informing the management of the water resources of the Murray-Darling Basin. In 2006, he was listed by The Canberra Times as one of the ten most influential people in water policy reform. In 2009, Young became the inaugural director of the Environment Institute at the University of Adelaide. He holds a Research Chair in Water Economics and Management there and has been a member of the Wentworth Group of Concerned Scientists since 2002. In 2013–14, Young held the Gough Whitlam and Malcolm Fraser Chair of Australian Studies at Harvard University.

== Early career ==
Prior to joining the University of Adelaide, Young worked for the CSIRO for thirty years. During this time, he established their Policy and Economic Research Unit with offices in Adelaide, Canberra and Perth.

== Nuclear waste ==
Young is interested in exploring the idea that there may be a role for the development of a nuclear waste storage industry in Australia.

In 2015/16, he chaired the South Australian Royal Commission into the Nuclear Cycle's Social and Economic Modelling and Assessment Committee.

== Honours ==
Young received a Centenary Medal for "outstanding service through environmental economics" in 2001. In 2005, The Canberra Times recognised Young as "Green Australian of the Year." In 2008, Young was awarded South Australian of the Year in the Environment category. He was elected fellow of the Academy of Social Sciences in Australia in 1998 and is a Distinguished Fellow of the Australian Agricultural and Resource Economics Society. He was appointed an Officer of the Order of Australia in the 2026 King's Birthday Honours in recognition of his "distinguished service to conservation and the environment, to water resource management, and to tertiary education".
