= Conservation International Guyana =

Country programme of Conservation International in Guyana

- Abbreviation: CI Guyana
- Formation: 1989
- Type: Country programme
- Purpose: Biodiversity conservation and sustainable development
- Headquarters: Georgetown, Guyana
- Region served: Guyana
- Parent organization: Conservation International
- Website: Official website

Conservation International Guyana (CI Guyana) is the Guyana country programme of Conservation International. Conservation International has worked in Guyana since 1989.

Its work has included community and protected-area conservation in southern Guyana, protected-area planning using Marxan, support for Guyana's national forest monitoring system under REDD+, mercury-reduction initiatives in gold mining, and coastal mangrove mapping.

== Overview ==
CI Guyana is based in Georgetown and maintains an office in Lethem in the Rupununi.

Programmes in southern Guyana have included support for conservation and management arrangements connected to the Kanashen Amerindian Protected Area. Nationwide work has included protected-area planning using Marxan and support for the monitoring, reporting and verification system (MRVS), Guyana's national forest monitoring system for REDD+ implementation.

Other activities have included the El Dorado Gold Project on mercury reduction in gold mining and mangrove cover mapping in coastal Guyana.

== History ==
Conservation International began working in Guyana in 1989.

Guyana's National Biodiversity Strategy and Action Plan (2012–2020) documented collaboration involving the Protected Areas Commission, Conservation International Guyana and the University of Kent to develop a methodology using Marxan to spatially map ecosystems and biodiversity areas for protected-area planning.

In the Guyana–Norway REDD+ partnership, Conservation International Guyana was described as a facilitating partner in implementation arrangements for enabling activities.

In 2017, a second phase of Guyana's forest monitoring work under the Monitoring Reporting and Verification System (MRVS) got underway, with Conservation International Guyana supporting the Guyana Forestry Commission in implementation. The MRVS is a national forest monitoring system that tracks changes in forest cover and estimates associated emissions as part of Guyana's REDD+ programme.

In 2018, Conservation International Guyana launched the El Dorado Gold Project, a programme intended to reduce mercury use in artisanal and small-scale gold mining and promote mercury-free mining practices. Miners in Mahdia were briefed on the project during a mining school forum and mini symposium.

== Programmes and operations ==
Selected programme locations in Guyana (1 Georgetown, 2 Lethem, 3 Kanashen, 4 Mahdia)

=== Kanashen Amerindian Protected Area ===
In southern Guyana, CI Guyana's work has included support for conservation and management arrangements connected to the Kanashen Amerindian Protected Area in Region Nine. The area was also referred to as Konashen in reporting on its gazettal in 2017.

In the Kanashen Indigenous District, the Kanashen Village Council received absolute title to its lands in 2004 and designated them as a Community Owned Conservation Area in 2007 under the Amerindian Act 2006. The Government of Guyana gazetted the area in 2017 as the Kanashen Amerindian Protected Area, with the Kanashen Village Council listed as the management authority; the protected area covers about 648,567 hectares (6,486 km^{2}).

The management plan for 2022–2026 included Conservation International Guyana among the bodies involved in implementation arrangements, including community consultations, ranger training and baseline biological surveys.

=== Lethem and the Rupununi ===
In the Rupununi, CI Guyana maintains an office in Lethem and has supported conservation and development work in southern Guyana.

The Kanuku Mountains Protected Area in Region Nine was proposed as part of Guyana's National Protected Areas System, and CI Guyana was appointed by the government as the lead agency to facilitate the process for part of the Kanuku Mountains to become a national protected area. In 2007, the delineation process began using a participatory approach involving indigenous communities, state agencies, and local and national government bodies.

After the boundaries were finalized, CI Guyana was further engaged to develop a management plan for the proposed protected area using participatory methods. A later management plan stated that this work included community consultations and workshops with local representative bodies and government agencies in the Rupununi, and that the protected area covers 611,000 hectares in southwestern Guyana.

Community development work in the Rupununi has also included participation in the Sustainable Development Agreement Framework for indigenous villages. Meetings in Annai and Lethem in 2016 involved CI Guyana alongside village councils and regional and national bodies, and the framework was described as supporting long-term community development planning in Amerindian villages.

=== Mahdia and interior mining districts ===
In interior mining districts, CI Guyana's work has included the El Dorado Gold Project, launched in 2018 to reduce mercury use in artisanal and small-scale gold mining and promote mercury-free mining practices. A 2023 extractive-industry transparency report described El Dorado as an initiative led by Conservation International Guyana in partnership with the Guyana Women Miners Organisation, the Guyana Geology and Mines Commission, the Guyana Gold and Diamond Miners Association, the National Toshaos Council and the Ministry of Natural Resources, and stated that it aimed to support mercury-free mining and the production of mercury-free gold jewellery in Guyana.

A mining school forum and mini symposium in Mahdia included a briefing on the El Dorado Gold Project and involved state and non-state partners, including Conservation International Guyana. Academic research on artisanal and small-scale gold mining in Mahdia described extensive mercury use and limited preparedness to adopt mercury-free technologies, providing context for later mercury-reduction initiatives in the district.

A 2022 evaluation of GEF interventions in the artisanal and small-scale gold mining sector described the Guyana project led by Conservation International as distinctive within the GOLD programme because it combined mercury reduction with a landscape approach and a financing component focused on developing a national gold brand.

=== Coastal Guyana ===
In coastal Guyana, CI Guyana and the National Agricultural Research and Extension Institute signed a memorandum of understanding in 2018 to implement a project intended to fill knowledge gaps on Guyana's mangroves under the North Brazil Shelf Large Marine Ecosystem programme. Reported outputs included updated mangrove forest cover and change estimates, valuation of mangrove ecosystem goods and services, threat assessments, and the establishment of national and regional coordination arrangements for mangrove management.

Under that work, mangrove cover mapping was carried out in Guyana under the North Brazil Shelf Mangrove Project. In Guyana, the project worked with the Mangrove Department of the National Agricultural Research and Extension Institute, and Conservation International Guyana was listed among the implementing partners.

A 2024 study of coastal mangrove monitoring in Guyana described prior remote sensing work for mangroves in Guyana as having been carried out by Conservation International, which developed a 2018 mangrove extent map based on Sentinel-2 imagery. The study used that earlier map as a baseline in comparing later mapping approaches for Guyana's coast.

=== Nationwide ===
Protected-area planning at the national scale included collaboration to develop a Marxan-based methodology for spatially mapping ecosystems and biodiversity areas for Guyana's protected-areas system. A 2017 study of systematic conservation planning in Guyana described a stakeholder-led spatial prioritization process that used Marxan to identify priority areas for 17 vegetation types and 329 vertebrate species while accounting for opportunity costs associated with forestry, mining, agriculture and urbanisation.

CI Guyana has also supported implementation of the MRVS, a national forest monitoring system used in Guyana's REDD+ programme. A progress report on MRVS Roadmap Phase 2 described CI Guyana as supporting the Guyana Forestry Commission in continued implementation of the system for Years 6 to 9.

The Guiana Shield Initiative also supported national forest monitoring and verification systems in Guyana and Suriname.

Selected landscapes and activity contexts of Conservation International Guyana
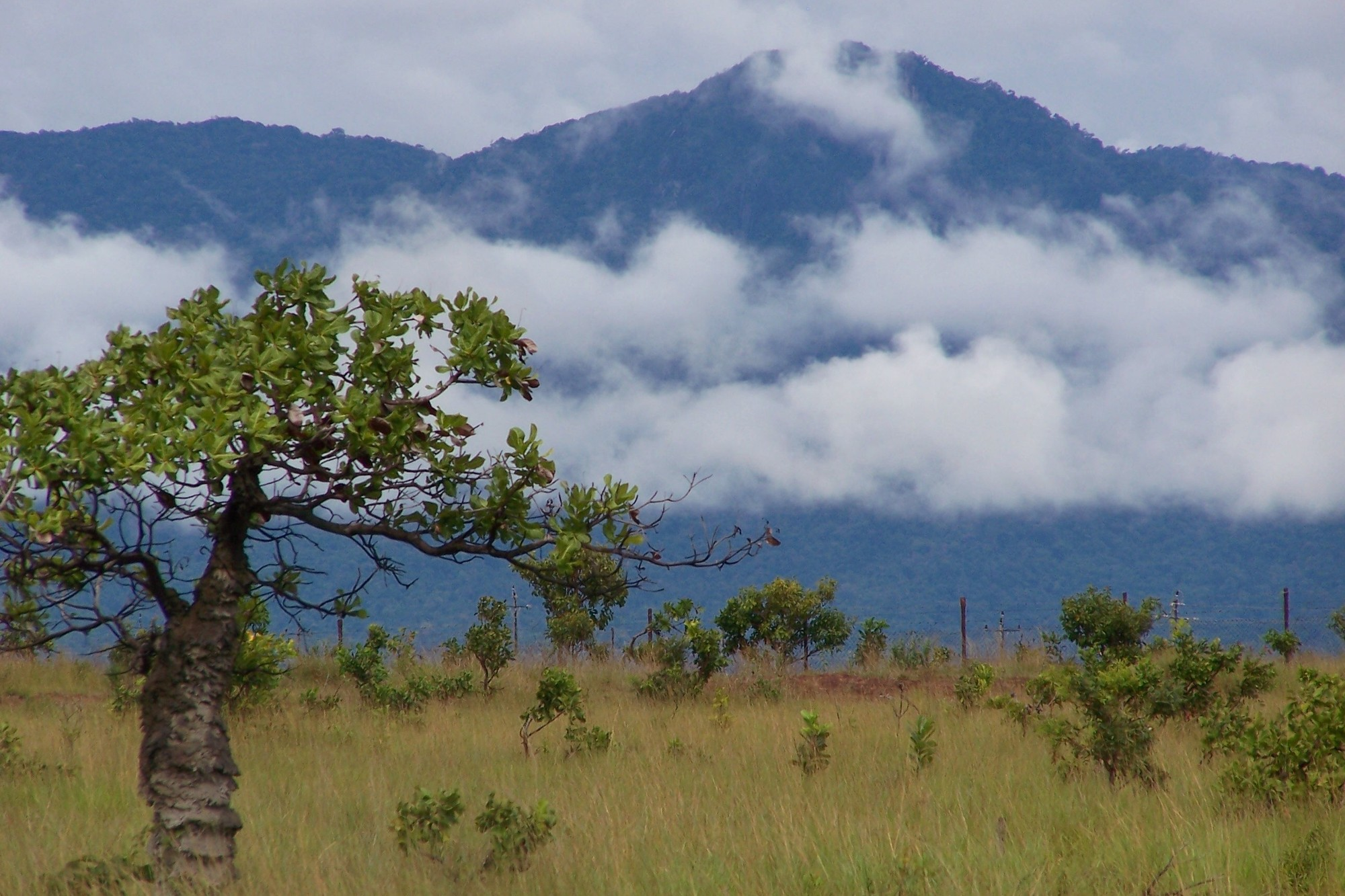
Kanuku Mountains as seen from Lethem, in the Rupununi

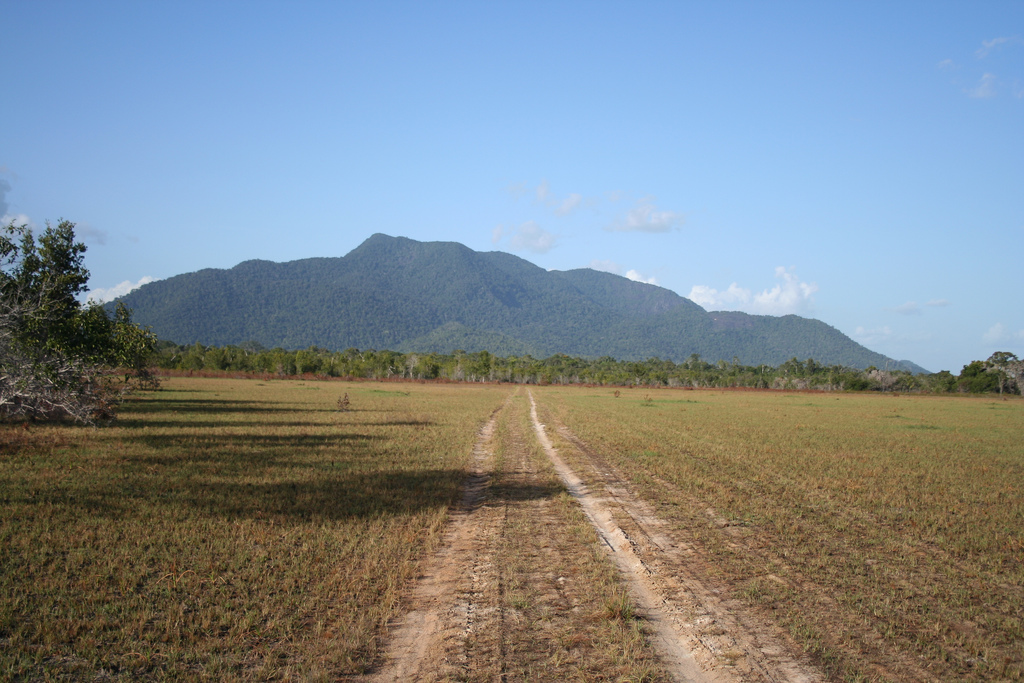
Rupununi savannah in southern Guyana

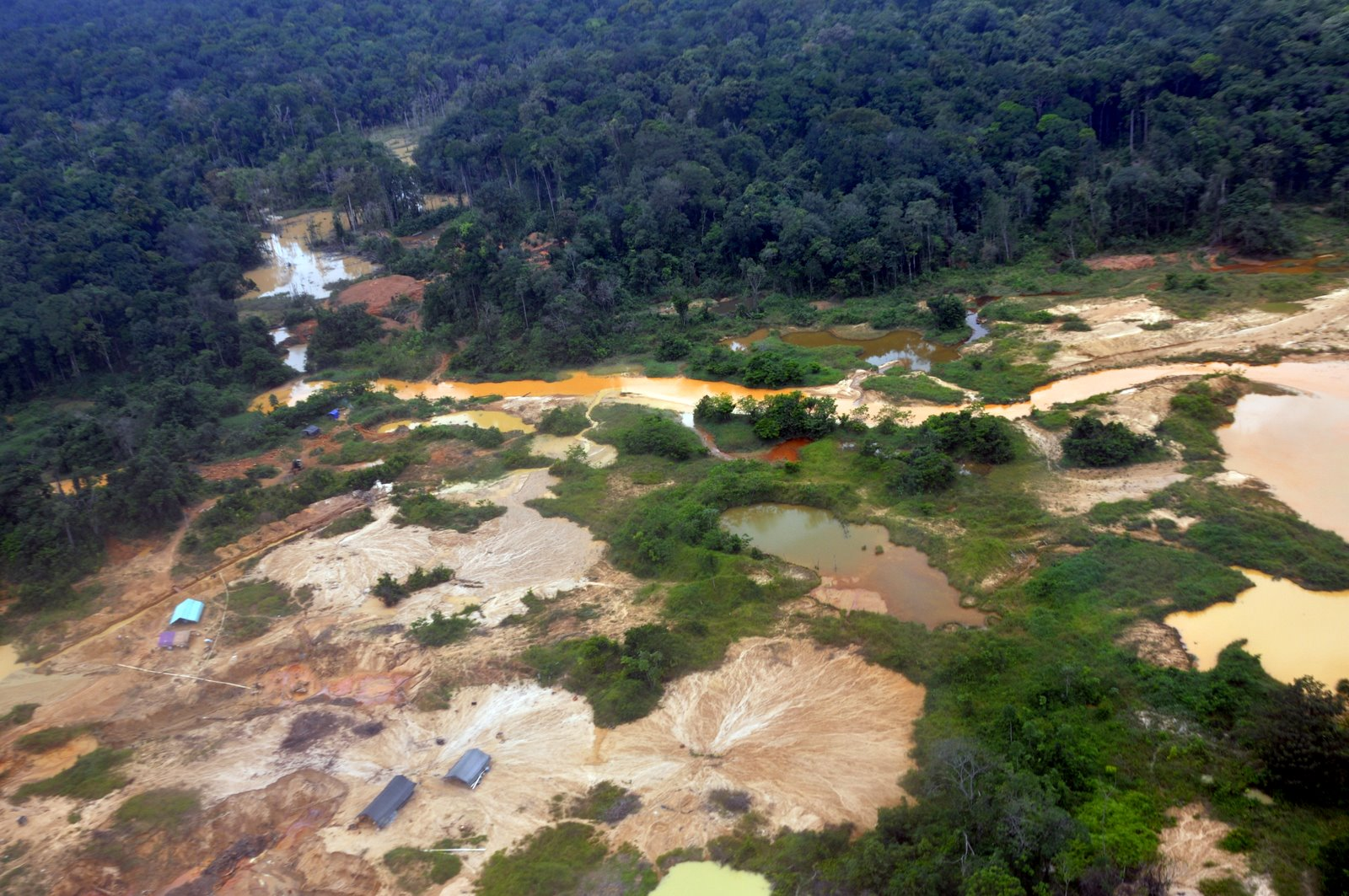
Gold mining near Mahdia, an interior mining district addressed by CI Guyana's mercury-reduction work

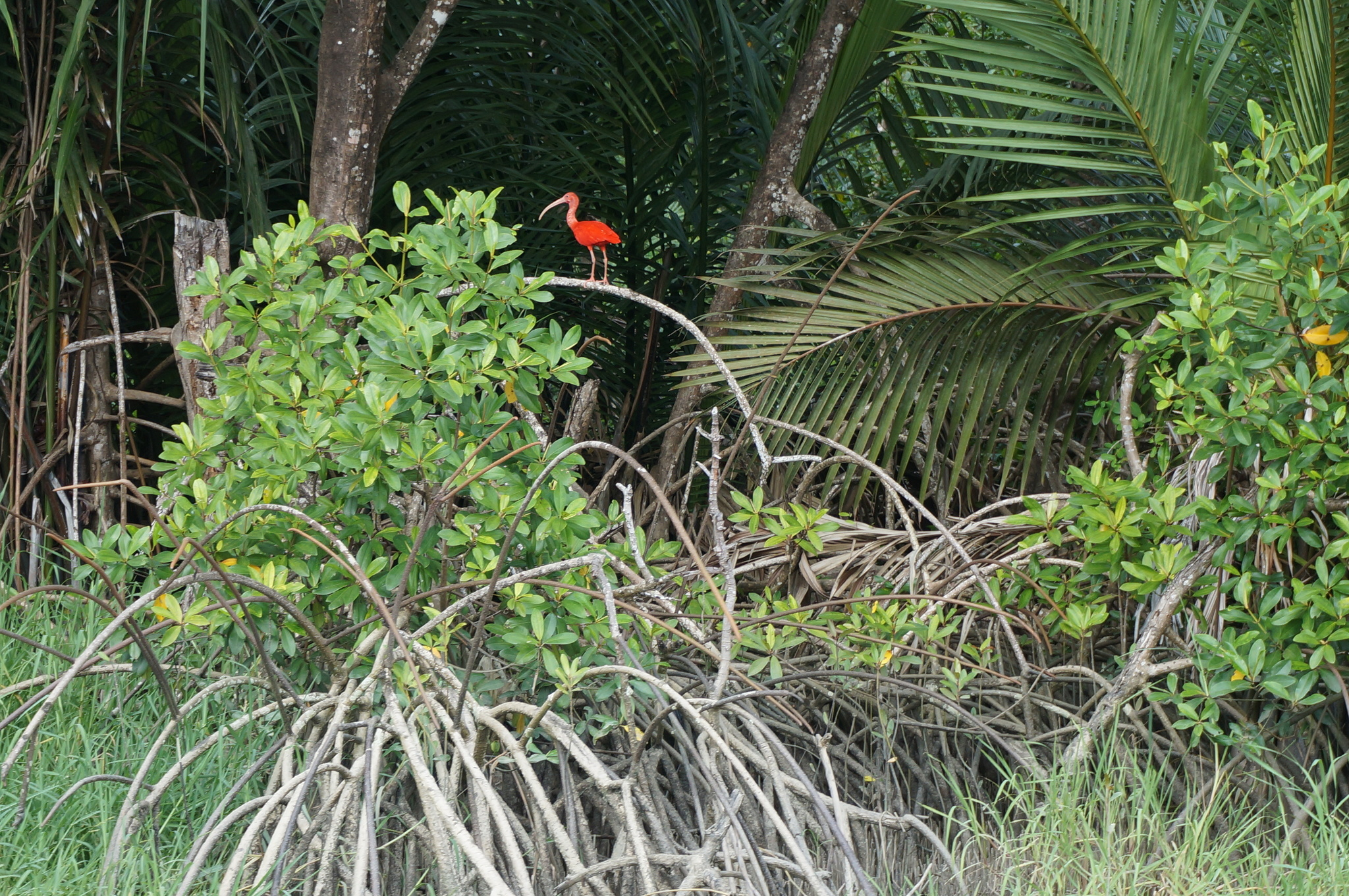
Scarlet ibis near the mouth of the Pomeroon River, in Guyana's coastal mangrove region

== Partnerships ==
CI Guyana's work has involved partnerships with government agencies, local communities, academic institutions and non-governmental organisations. In protected-area planning, Guyana's National Biodiversity Strategy and Action Plan documented collaboration involving the Protected Areas Commission, Conservation International Guyana and the University of Kent to develop a Marxan-based methodology for mapping ecosystems and biodiversity areas for the protected-areas system. In southern Guyana, the Kanashen management plan included Conservation International Guyana among the bodies involved in implementation arrangements, while the Kanuku Mountains process involved work with the Protected Areas Commission, indigenous communities, and other state and local bodies in delineation and management planning.

In REDD+ and natural-resource programmes, Conservation International Guyana was a facilitating partner in the Guyana–Norway partnership's enabling activities and later supported implementation of the MRVS with the Guyana Forestry Commission. Coastal mangrove work involved the Mangrove Department of the National Agricultural Research and Extension Institute, while the El Dorado Gold Project involved the Guyana Women Miners Organisation, the Guyana Geology and Mines Commission, the Guyana Gold and Diamond Miners Association, the National Toshaos Council and the Ministry of Natural Resources.

== Funding and conservation finance ==
Under the Guyana–Norway REDD+ partnership, Norway's payments to Guyana for reduced emissions from deforestation were based on the methodology set out in the Joint Concept Note. The payments covered performance in the period 2009 to 2015; while most payments were performance-based, some elements were not. As MRVS capacity improved, Guyana's performance was measured against its Forest Reference Emissions Level from 2015.

An institutional-strengthening project in support of Guyana's Low Carbon Development Strategy used a grant mechanism totaling US$7 million. Of that amount, US$5.594 million was sourced from the Guyana REDD+ Investment Fund (GRIF), while US$1.060 million was sourced from the Government of Norway through Conservation International. The component for design and implementation of a national MRV system accounted for US$3.661 million.

In 2017, Norway funds were released through Conservation International Guyana to the Guyana Forestry Commission for a second phase of MRVS work. A progress report on that phase stated that, with funding from the Norwegian Agency for Development Cooperation, CI Guyana supported the Guyana Forestry Commission in continued development and implementation of the national MRVS for Years 6 to 9 of Roadmap Phase 2 under the Guyana–Norway agreement.

A 2020 mid-term evaluation of support for Guyana's MRV system described it as one of the earlier efforts to design a national forest monitoring system capable of underpinning results-based payments under the Guyana–Norway partnership. The Guiana Shield Initiative also supported national forest monitoring and verification systems in Guyana and Suriname for use in REDD+ contexts linked to results-based payments.

== Impact and evaluation ==
An independent assessment of enabling activities under the Guyana–Norway REDD+ partnership described Conservation International Guyana as a facilitating partner used to channel financing for an outreach project. The same assessment reported that, at the August 2013 validation workshop, 6 of 18 indicators were met, 2 were partially met, 3 required further clarification, and 5 were not met. It stated that several shortfalls related to the wording of indicators, limited primary documented evidence, and delays affecting finance and partnerships.

A 2020 mid-term evaluation of support for Guyana's MRV system stated that the Guyana Forestry Commission's MRVS team had built substantial technical skills over the life of the project and had consolidated those skills in the second phase. It also reported that, by year 8, the team had achieved detailed analysis of emissions broken down by the drivers of deforestation and forest degradation. The evaluation recommended increasing domestic funding for operational costs over time, improving the usability of MRVS data, and strengthening the use of those data by specialist national stakeholders.

A 2017 ex-post evaluation of the Guiana Shield Initiative reported that, in Guyana and Suriname, the initiative focused on creating national MRVS as the basis for forest area monitoring and results-based payments within REDD+ contexts. It assigned the overall project a rating of 3 on KfW's six-point scale, stating that the project concept was overloaded and the objective too ambitious, while also noting that the measures had triggered follow-up projects in Guyana and Suriname.
