= Mahdia, Guyana =

Mahdia
- Town and regional capital
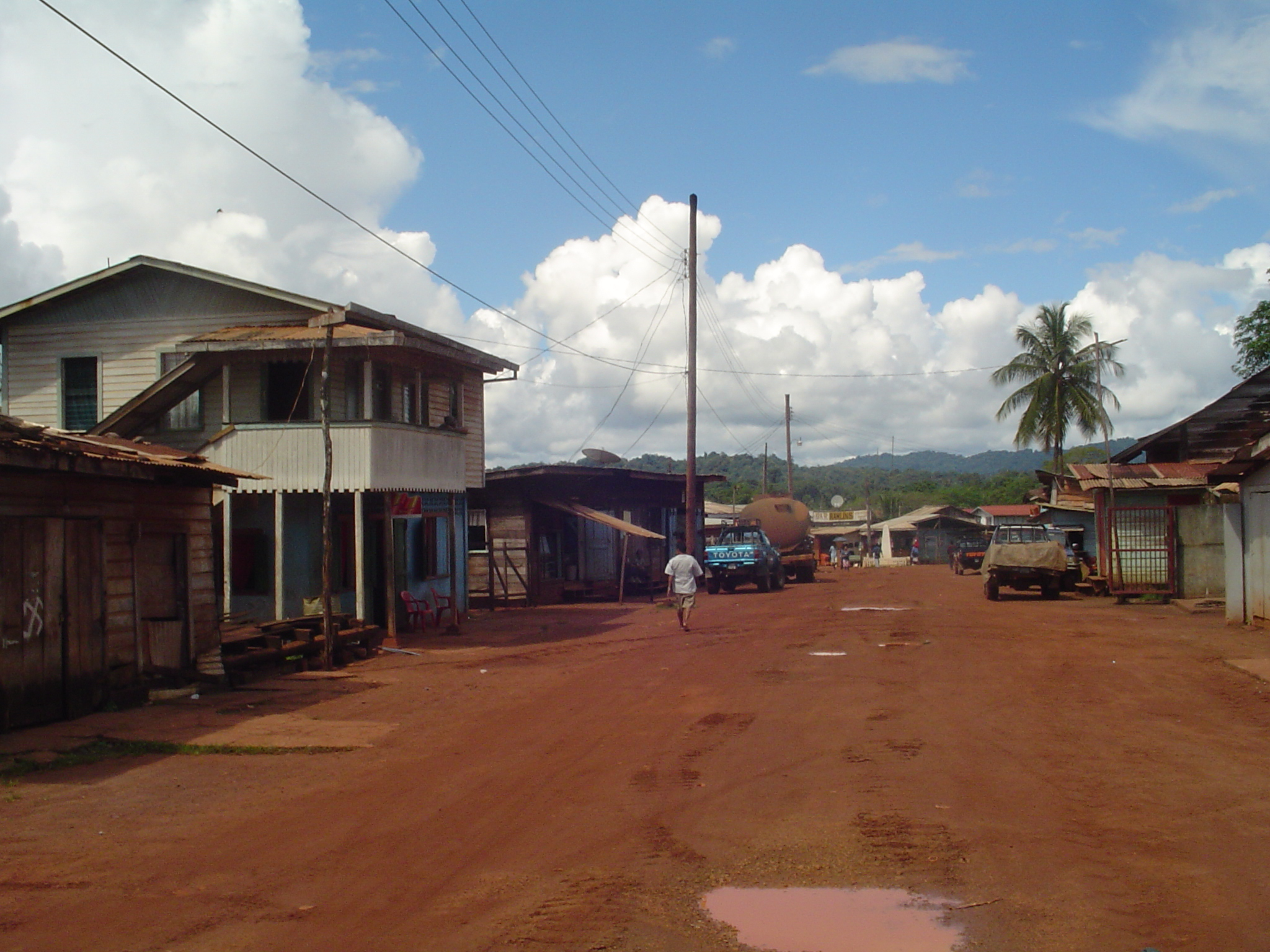
- Commercial area in Mahdia, May 2006

- Location in Guyana
- Coordinates: 05°16′57″N 59°09′00″W
- Country: Guyana
- Region: Potaro-Siparuni
- Elevation: 1,362 ft (415 m)

Population (2012)
  - Total: 2,563

Mahdia is a town in Guyana, located near the centre of the country at an altitude of 415 m (1,362 ft).

Commerce is centred on the area's gold and diamond mining operations. As such it is affected by the economic booms and busts and attracts immigrants, both local and foreign, to obtain wealth through mining.

== Demographics ==
The population in Mahdia as of 2012 was 2,563 people, and is of three groups. The Patamonas, an indigenous Amerindian tribe, are involved in farming, hunting and mining. The Coast Landers, residents from the coastlands of Guyana, migrated to the hinterland to seek employment mainly mining. The third group, called Islanders, are immigrants, and their descendants are from the Caribbean Islands, particularly, St Lucia and Dominica. They focus on farming and burning charcoal. Within recent times, there has been an influx of a new group, the Brazilians, who are also involved in mining and other businesses. On 10 September annually, the Amerindians celebrate Heritage Month in the community of Campbelltown, Mahdia, while the Islanders celebrate the La Rose Festival at the end of August. This festival was originated in St Lucia. Mahdia being the Regional Administrative Centre of Region 8, Potaro-Siparuni has the following relevant infrastructure:

- A cottage hospital
- A nursery, primary and a secondary school
- A commercial sector which includes dry goods, boutiques, a fuel station and 11 restaurants.
- Four hotels; two guest houses and four brothels
- A police station
- A post office
- Two artesian wells
- A Regional Administrative Office
- An airstrip

Residents still depend on rainfall and water from the Salbora Falls. While electricity is currently provided by local businessmen.

== History ==
Mahdia was established in 1884, by the Africans after their emancipation. Most of them travelled from the county of Berbice and the East Coast of Demerara in search of gold. The British Consolidated Mining Company, expanded the mining exploration in Mahdia and established, Colonial Administrative offices. During this period Mahdia was only accessible by waterways.

Gold mining attracted a number of St. Lucians to Mahdia, bringing with them the French Patois (Kweol) language and cultural traditions such as La Rose celebration.

In November 1933 a bridge was constructed over the Garraway Stream, linking Mahdia to Bartica by trail. This bridge which is suspended by cables was named the Denham Suspension Bridge, after the then Colonial Governor Sir Edward Denham. It is still in use today and has become a tourist site. In 2018, Mahdia received town status.

In May 2023, a fire destroyed a local secondary school dormitory, killing at least 19 students.

== Mining ==
There are 150 land dredges in the mining district of Mahdia. Most miners use excavators to extract the overburden and utilize gravel pumps to extract the gravel with gold from the pits. On most occasions the pits are not refilled which allows the anopheles mosquito to breed, increasing the spread of malaria. In 2005, the Guyana Geology and Mines Commission has embarked upon reinforcing the amendment regulations for environmental management, instantly creating an impact on the community by curbing the pollution of water ways and encouraging soil reclamation and replanting trees in deforested areas.

In 2018, Conservation International Guyana launched the El Dorado Gold Project, intended to reduce mercury use in artisanal and small-scale gold mining and promote mercury-free mining practices; miners in Mahdia were briefed on the project during a mining school forum and mini symposium.

== Climate ==
Mahdia has a tropical rainforest climate (Af) with heavy to very heavy rainfall year-round.

Climate data for Mahdia
Month	Jan	Feb	Mar	Apr	May	Jun	Jul	Aug	Sep	Oct	Nov	Dec	Year
Mean daily maximum °C (°F)	29.6 (85.3)	29.7 (85.5)	30.1 (86.2)	30.7 (87.3)	30.8 (87.4)	30.5 (86.9)	30.5 (86.9)	31.1 (88.0)	31.6 (88.9)	31.6 (88.9)	31.0 (87.8)	30.2 (86.4)	30.6 (87.1)
Daily mean °C (°F)	25.5 (77.9)	25.6 (78.1)	26.0 (78.8)	26.5 (79.7)	26.9 (80.4)	26.5 (79.7)	26.4 (79.5)	27.0 (80.6)	27.3 (81.1)	27.3 (81.1)	26.8 (80.2)	26.1 (79.0)	26.5 (79.7)
Mean daily minimum °C (°F)	21.4 (70.5)	21.5 (70.7)	21.9 (71.4)	22.4 (72.3)	23.0 (73.4)	22.5 (72.5)	22.4 (72.3)	22.9 (73.2)	23.1 (73.6)	23.1 (73.6)	22.6 (72.7)	22.0 (71.6)	22.4 (72.3)
Average rainfall mm (inches)	269 (10.6)	185 (7.3)	185 (7.3)	232 (9.1)	364 (14.3)	418 (16.5)	326 (12.8)	263 (10.4)	114 (4.5)	93 (3.7)	140 (5.5)	237 (9.3)	2,826 (111.3)
Source: Climate-Data.org

== Gallery ==
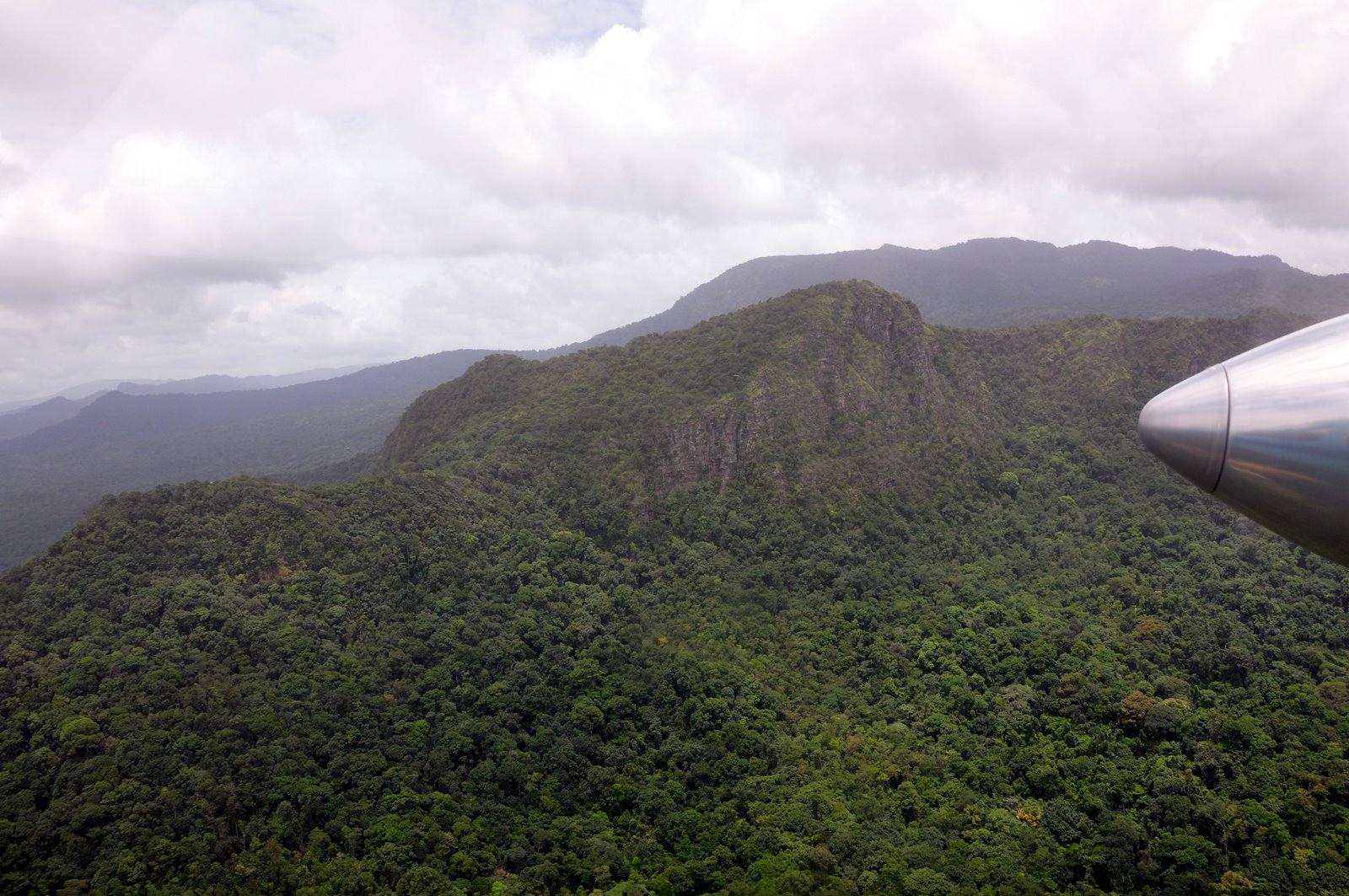
Some Peaks Close to Mahdia

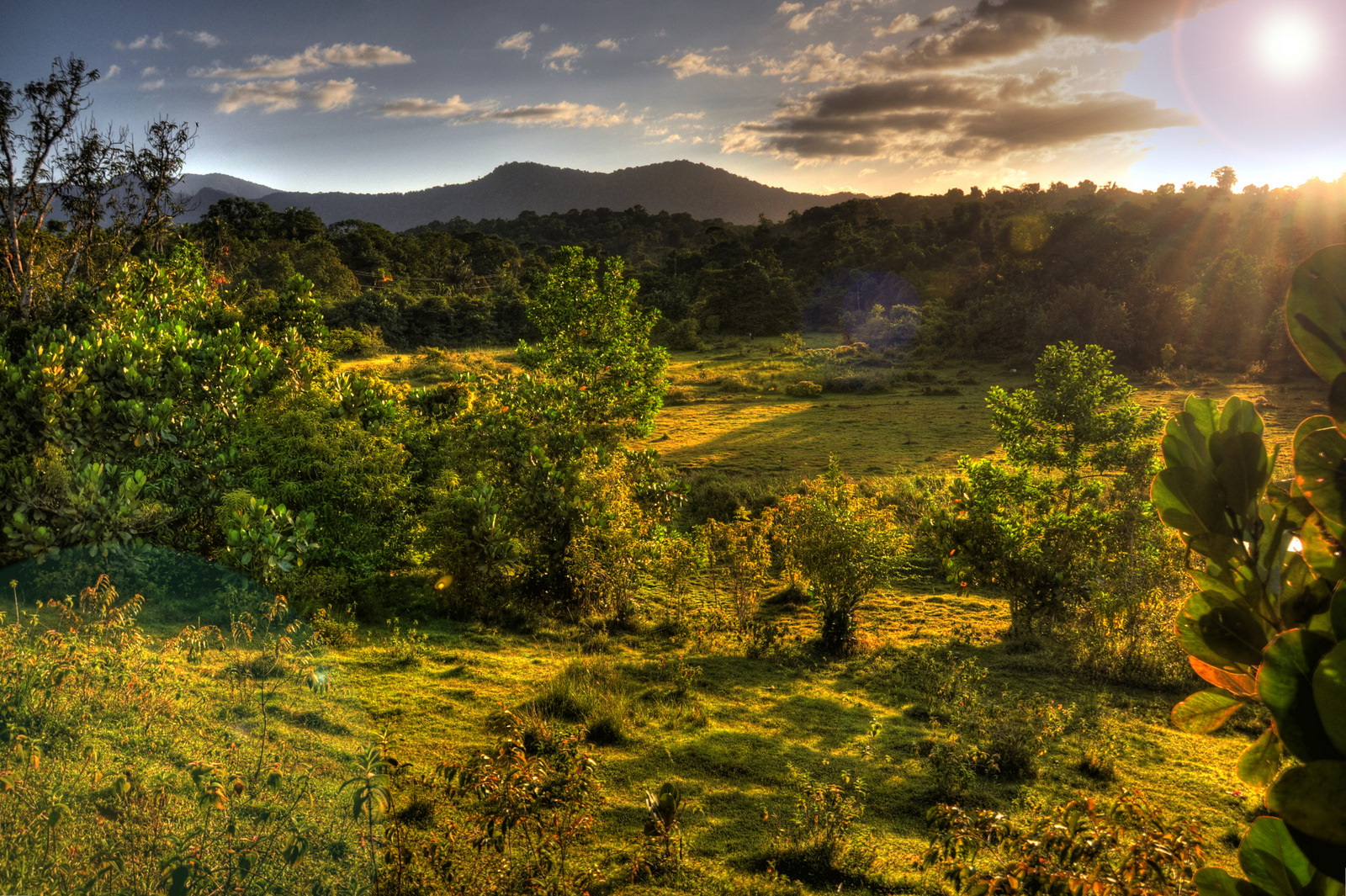

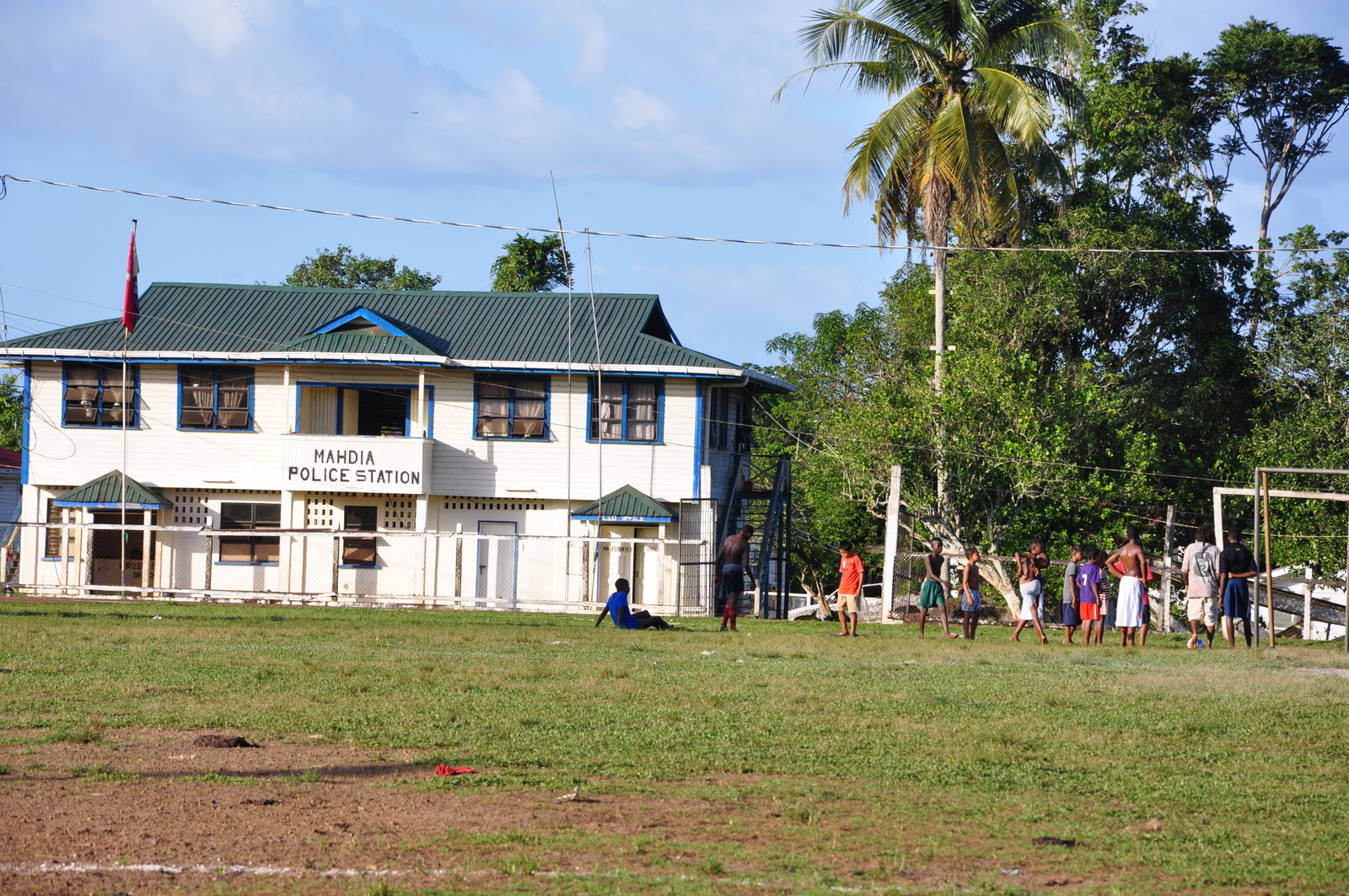
Mahdia Police Station

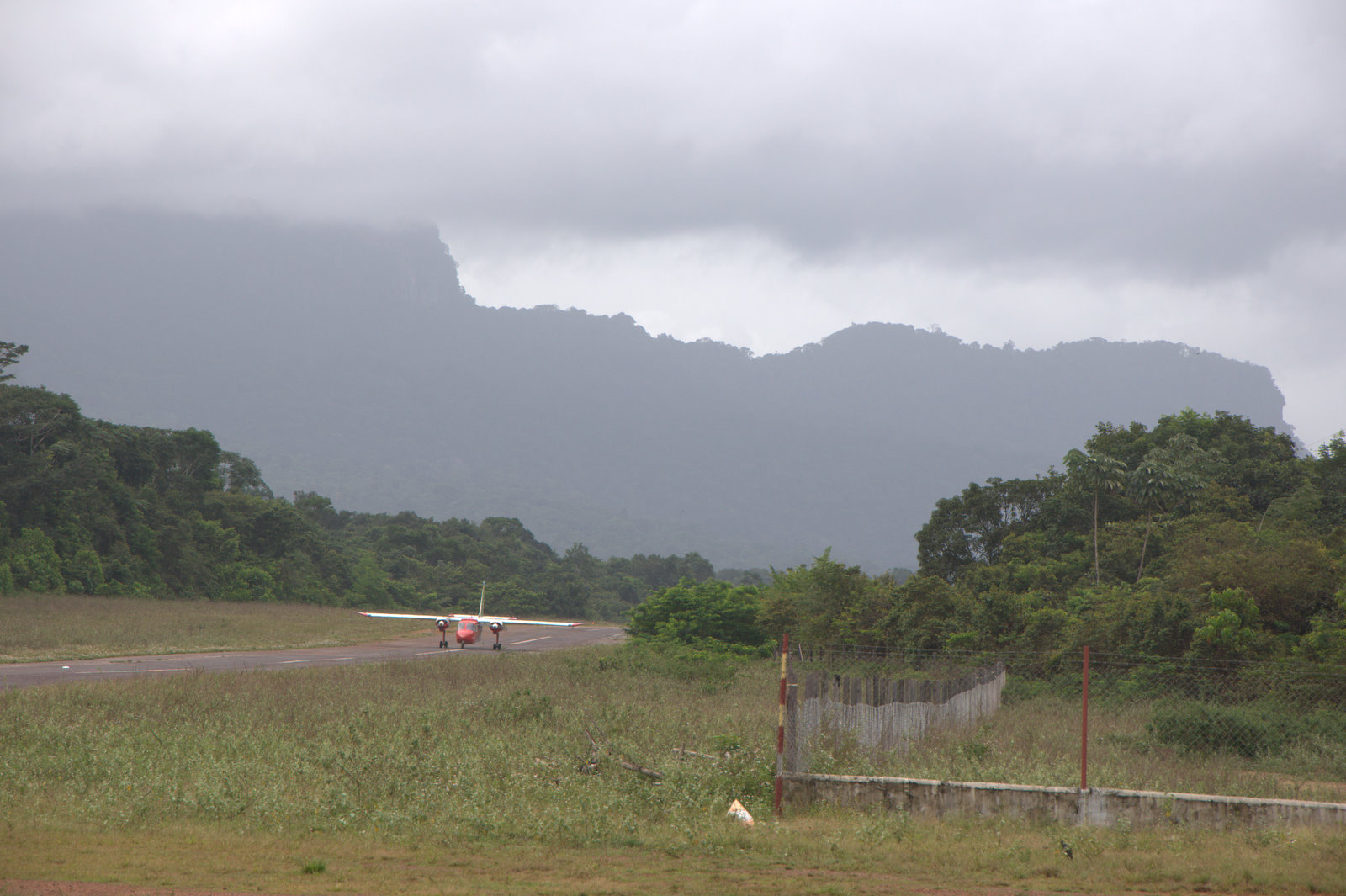
Mahdia Airstrip
