= Monkey Mountain Airport =

Airport in Guyana

- IATA: MYM; ICAO: SYMM

Summary
- Serves: Monkey Mountain
- Elevation AMSL: 1,699 ft / 518 m
- Coordinates: 4°27′08″N 59°36′10″W

Map
- Location in Guyana

Runways
Direction	Length		Surface
Direction	m	ft	Surface
10/28	700	2,297	Grass
- Sources: SkyVector Google Maps

Monkey Mountain Airport (IATA: MYM, ICAO: SYMM) is an airport serving the village of Monkey Mountain, in the Potaro-Siparuni Region of Guyana. The runway is a 700-meter grass surface.

== See also ==
- List of airports in Guyana
- Transport in Guyana
