= Marxan =

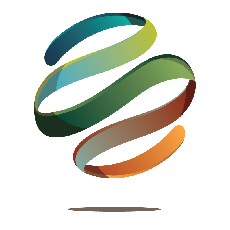
Marxan logo

MARXAN is a family of software designed to aid systematic reserve design on conservation planning. With the use of stochastic optimisation routines (Simulated Annealing) Marxan generates spatial reserve systems that achieve particular biodiversity representation goals with reasonable optimality. Over the years, Marxan has grown from its standard two zone application to consider more complex challenges like incorporating connectivity, probabilities and multiple zones. Along the way, Marxan's user community has also built plug-ins and interfaces to assist with planning projects.

Computationally, Marxan provides solutions to a conservation version of the 0-1 knapsack problem, where the objects of interest are potential reserve sites with given biological attributes. The simulated annealing algorithm attempts to minimise the total cost of the reserve system, while achieving a set of conservation goals (typically that a certain percentage of each geographical/biological feature is represented by the reserve system).

== History ==
Marxan is a portmanteau acronym, fusing MARine, and SPEXAN, itself an acronym for SPatially EXplicit ANnealing. It was a product of Ian R. Ball's PhD thesis, while he was a student at the University of Adelaide in 2000, and was supervised and funded by Professor Hugh Possingham, the state of Queensland's (Australia) current Chief Scientist who holds a Federation Fellowship at the University of Queensland. It was an extension of the existing SPEXAN program.

In 2018, the vision of "Democratizing Marxan" began. Through the Biodiversity and Protected Areas Management programme (BIOPAMA), funded by the European Union, the Joint Research Centre worked closely with The Nature Conservancy to prototype a web-based Marxan platform that improves accessibility to non-experts and supports our common vision of providing accessible tools for evidence-based conservation planning. This led to a partnership with Microsoft in 2020, which aims to scale Marxan's infrastructure for global accessibility and empowering users with the tools and data they need to make smarter decisions for the planet. In late 2020 and early 2021 Microsoft's Azure Quantum team made several open source contributions to Marxan resulting in increased performance when running on multi-core machines and cloud environments. The resulting version 4 of Marxan is now available from marxansolutions.org.

== Applications ==
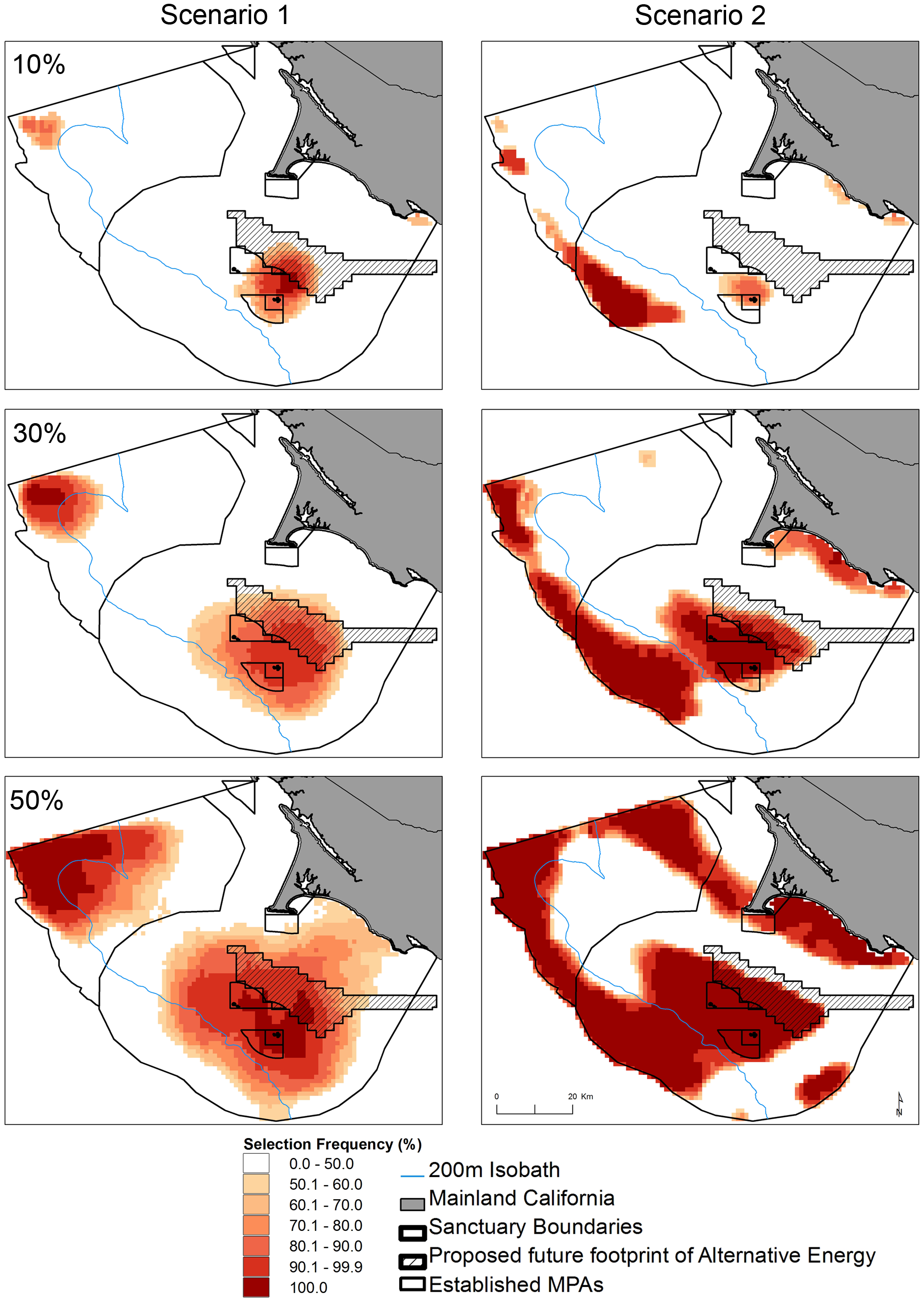
Example Marxan outputs - selection frequency (the summed solution of each planning unit across all runs in a Marxan analysis). Figure 7 from McGowan et al. 2013, a comparison of Marxan results prioritizing conservation of seabird habitat alone (scenario 1) and with the inclusion of human activities (scenario 2), shown by the cell selection frequency for 10, 30, and 50% conservation targets.

MARXAN is the most widely used systematic reserve planning software in the world, and has been used to create the marine reserve network on the Great Barrier Reef, in Queensland, Australia, the largest marine protected area in the world. It has been used for many other marine and terrestrial reserve planning applications.

- Channel Islands of California
- Gulf of Mexico
- Galapagos Islands
- South Australia
- British Columbia
- Connecticut/New York
- Central Coast of California
- Baltic Sea

Beyond protected area network design, MARXAN has been applied to hundreds of conservation planning challenges, from designing optimal poaching patrols for game reserves and identifying where to conserve essential ecosystem services, to helping with transboundary ocean planning and understanding where transnational collaborations might best be prioritized to achieve conservation goals. While it would be almost impossible to list all of MARXAN's applications, here are a few examples beyond protected area network design. For software specific examples, see the Software section.

- Restoration activities in the Atlantic Forest, Brazil, in the Yucatán Peninsula in the Mexican Caribbean, in the Murray–Darling Basin in South Australia, and southwestern Alberta, Canada
- Provision of ecosystem services in Central Coast ecoregion of California, United States, Telemark in southern Norway, and Vermont, United States
- Understanding trade-offs between competing objectives in the Andes of Bolivia, and Central Kalimantan, Indonesia
- Identifying management priorities in the Danube River Basin, Europe, and South Africa's grassland biome
- Law enforcement activities in the Greater Virunga Landscape, in central Africa, and the Patos Lagoon estuary along the Brazilian coast

MARXAN has been used extensively by The Nature Conservancy, and is a major part of the systematic planning tools being used in the Global Marine Initiative. The World Wildlife Fund used MARXAN to define a Global set of Marine Protected Areas, the Roadmap to Recovery, which they used to petition the UN about the creation of open ocean marine reserve networks.

The software has also been used in terrestrial applications, such as:

- The North American Wildlands Project.
- Selecting priority areas for Global Mammal Assemblages.
- Planning the conservation of ecosystem services.
- The Great Sand Hills of Saskatchewan Regional Environmental Study

Guyana’s National Biodiversity Strategy and Action Plan (2012–2020) documents collaboration involving the Protected Areas Commission, Conservation International Guyana and the University of Kent to develop a methodology using Marxan to map ecosystems and biodiversity areas for protected-area planning.

== Software ==
=== Marxan ===
Marxan is the most widely used decision-support software for conservation planning globally, and has been used to build marine and terrestrial conservation systems covering approximately 5% of the Earth's surface. Marxan supports the design of cost-efficient networks that meet conservation targets for biodiversity.

=== Marxan with Zones ===
Marxan with Zones has the same functionality as Marxan but extends on the range of problems the software can solve and allows for the incorporation of multiple costs and zones into a systematic planning framework. Applications could be zoning for marine protected areas with various protection levels or landscapes that balance agriculture, biodiversity protection, and sustainable forestry zones. Marxan with Zones assigns each planning unit in a study region to a particular zone in order to meet a number of ecological, social and economic objectives at a minimum total cost. Some example locations where it has been used to inform decisions includes Raja Ampat, Indonesia, Tun Mustapha Park in Sabah, Malaysia, Central Kalimantan, Indonesia, and Indonesian Borneo.

=== Marxan with Connectivity ===
Marxan with Connectivity is an extension of the Marxan software family that allows for more sophisticated connectivity considerations in spatial planning. For example, sites may be connected through processes such as larval dispersal, animal migrations, and genetic flows which are desirable objectives in conservation plans. Marxan with Connectivity has been applied in freshwater, marine, terrestrial and land-sea systems to conserve sites that may be spatially distanced but ecologically connected. Some examples include planning for threatened loggerhead sea turtles (Caretta caretta) in the Mediterranean, and accounting for river connectivity in the Guadiana River basin in the southwestern Iberian Peninsula. It has been recently operationalized through 'Marxan Connect' - a new open source, open access Graphical User Interface (GUI) tool designed to assist conservation planners with the appropriate use of data on ecological connectivity in protected area network planning.

=== Marxan with Probability ===
Marxan with Probability (MarProb) is Marxan with an additional objective function term that incorporates the probability of a site being destroyed at some point in the future. This function helps plan for persistence in protected area networks (see Game et al. 2008). Some examples where it has been used includes planning for Iberian herptile conservation while accounting for uncertainty in their predicted distributions due to climate change, and accounting for the inherent uncertainty associated with coral reef habitat maps in conservation planning, in the Kubulau District fisheries management area, Fiji.

=== Companion Tools ===
==== Zonae Cogito ====
Zonae Cogito is a freely available software package that help manage and visualise Marxan projects. The interface streamlines and simplifies the development and evaluation of alternative planning scenarios, allows direct editing to input files, calibrates parameters, and helps users easily access important output files for evaluation.

==== CLUZ ====
CLUZ (Conservation Land-Use Zoning software) is a QGIS plug-in that allows users to design protected area networks and other conservation landscapes and seascapes. It can be used for on-screen planning and also acts as a link for the Marxan conservation planning software. It was developed by Bob Smith and funded by the UK Government's E3 Sharing Space for Nature project.

==== Marxan toolboxes ====
Helpful tools developed by Trevor Wiens from Apropos Information Systems are available for both ArcGIS and QGIS users.

==== Prioritizr ====
Systematic Conservation Prioritization in R – The prioritizr R package uses integer linear programming (ILP) techniques to provide a flexible interface for building and solving conservation planning problems. It supports a broad range of objectives, constraints, and penalties that can be used to custom-tailor conservation planning problems to the specific needs of a conservation planning exercise. Once built, conservation planning problems can be solved using a variety of commercial and open-source exact algorithm solvers. In contrast to the algorithms conventionally used to solve conservation problems, such as heuristics or simulated annealing, the exact algorithms used here are guaranteed to find optimal solutions. Furthermore, conservation problems can be constructed to optimize the spatial allocation of different management actions or zones, meaning that conservation practitioners can identify solutions that benefit multiple stakeholders. Finally, this package has the functionality to read input data formatted for the Marxan conservation planning program, and find much cheaper solutions in a much shorter period of time than Marxan.
