= Monkey Mountain, Missouri =

Hill in Missouri, USA

Monkey Mountain refers to both a hill in Jackson County, Missouri and the nature preserve surrounding it. Its elevation is 948 ft (289 m). The mountain is located at 39°00′21″N 94°10′55″W.

== Nature preserve ==
The park is popular among equestrians and hikers for its variety of terrain. These include marshy lowlands in the northwest, steep heavily-wooded climbs on the east and south sides, rocky outcroppings on the southern side, and a large rolling meadow spreading east from the center of the park. There are several ponds, streams, and a waterfall.

The park features a 3.5-mile primary loop trail, as well as numerous side trails. The park is accessible from a small gravel lot on the south side or from a softball field parking lot on the north side.

The park was formerly part of Sni-A-Bar Farm that was owned by Kansas City newspaperman, and philanthropist, William Rockhill Nelson.
