= Michael Bulmer =

British biostatistician (born 1931)

- Born: Michael George Bulmer; May 10, 1931 (age 94); Birmingham, England
- Education: University of Oxford
- Known for: Population genetics Quantitative genetics Twinning
- Awards: Fellow of the Royal Society (1997)
- Scientific career
- Fields: Biostatistics
- Institutions: University of Manchester; University of Oxford; Rutgers University
- Thesis: A method of finding approximate confidence limits for the analysis of variance (1958)
- Website: michaelbulmer.com

Michael George Bulmer FRS (born 10 May 1931) is a British biostatistician. He is an emeritus fellow of Wolfson College, Oxford, and a Fellow of the Royal Society of London. He is known for his work in quantitative genetics and on the biology of twinning, as well as for his 2003 biography of Francis Galton.

== Biography ==
Bulmer was born in Birmingham, England, in 1931. After graduating from Rugby School, he studied at Merton College, Oxford, from 1949 to 1957, taking a B.A. in animal physiology in 1952, a diploma in applied statistics the following year, a D.Phil. in statistics in 1957, and a D.Sc. He then lectured at the University of Manchester from 1957 to 1959, after which he became a lecturer in biomathematics at the University of Oxford. In 1991, he left Oxford to become a professor in the Department of Biological Sciences at Rutgers University, where he remained until 1995.
