= Wentworth Group of Concerned Scientists =

Australian independent group

The Wentworth Group of Concerned Scientists (usually known as the Wentworth Group) is an independent group comprising Australian scientists, economists, and business people with conservation interests.

== History ==
The name of the group comes from the venue of their principal meetings prior to release of their first blueprint, Blueprint for a Living Continent, in November 2002.

== Program ==
The Wentworth Group has three core objectives:

- Driving innovation in the management of Australia's biodiversity, land, and water resources;
- Engage business, community and political leaders in a dialogue to find and implement solutions to the challenge of environmental stewardship facing the future of Australian society;
- Building capacity by mentoring and supporting young scientists, lawyers and economists to develop their skills and understanding of public policy.

Their first statement, Blueprint for a Living Continent, set out what it believed were the key changes that needed to be made to deliver a sustainable future for our continent and its people. The Group emphasised the need to:

- Clarify water property rights and the obligations associated with those rights to give farmers some certainty and to enable water to be recovered for the environment.
- Restore environmental flows to stressed rivers, such as the River Murray and its tributaries.
- Immediately end broad scale land clearing of remnant native vegetation and assist rural communities with adjustment. This provides fundamental benefits to water quality, prevention of salinity, prevention of soil loss and conservation of biodiversity.
- Pay farmers for environmental services (clean water, fresh air, healthy soils). Where we expect farmers to maintain land in a certain way that is above their duty of care, we should pay them to provide those services on behalf of the rest of Australia.
- Incorporate into the cost of food, fibre and water the hidden subsidies currently borne by the environment, to assist farmers to farm sustainably and profitably in this country.

== Members ==
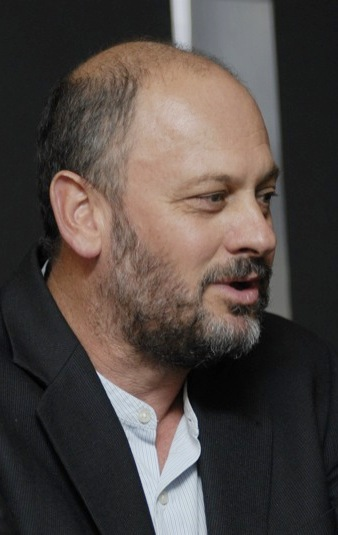
Tim Flannery, FAA, a palaeontologist

As of 2025 the Wentworth Group members include:

- Emma Carmody, an international environmental lawyer and co-founder of Restore Blue
- Lesley Hughes, an ecologist who is a Councillor of the Australian Climate Council; Lead Author, Intergovernmental Panel on Climate Change, Working Group II; Professorial Fellow, Department of Biological Sciences, Macquarie University
- David Karoly, FAA, an atmospheric scientist who is the Professor of Atmospheric Science, University of Melbourne; Member, Australian Climate Change Authority; Lead Author, Intergovernmental Panel on Climate Change
- Richard Kingsford, a river ecologist and conservation biologist who is director for the Center for Ecosystem Science University of New South Wales
- Bradley Moggridge, a proud Kamilaroi man and environmental hydrogeologist
- Jamie Pittock, an environmental scientist at the Australian National University and Member of the World Commission on Protected Areas
- Fran Sheldon, a river ecologist and Member of the Australian Rivers Institute, Griffith University
- Emeritus Professor Bruce Thom, AM, FTSE, a geographer who is the Chair of the 2001 Australian State of the Environment; and a former Chair, Australian Coast and Climate Change Council
- Teagan Shields, a proud Arabanna descendant from Lake Eyre country and has a PhD in empowering indigenous biodiversity conservation at the University of Melbourne.
- Martijn Wilder, AM, Lawyer at Baker McKenzie, Professor of Climate Change Law at the Australian National University, Chair of the Australian Renewable Energy Agency, a director of the Clean Energy Finance Corporation, WWF Australia, and the Climate Council
- Justine Bell-James is a Professor in the TC Beirne School of Law at the University of Queensland. Her research focus is environmental and climate change law, with a particular interest in legal issues surrounding marine and coastal restoration.
- Dr Matthew Colloff, Honorary Senior Lecturer, Fenner School of Environment and Society, Australian National University.

=== Former members ===
- Rob Purves, AM, a businessman and philanthropist who is the president of WWF Australia; Chair, Purves Environmental Fund
- Tim Flannery, FAA, a mammalogist, palaeontologist, environmentalist and global warming activist, awarded as the 2007 Australian of the Year
- Terry Hillman, AM, an ecologist who is an adjunct professor at La Trobe University; a former Member of the Murray-Darling Basin Sustainable Rivers Audit
- Peter Cosier, AM, an urban and regional planner, policy analyst, and conservationist
- Anna Skarbek, an investment banker and lawyer, CEO of ClimateWorks Australia, and director of the Clean Energy Finance Corporation
- Neil Byron, a resource economist, who was a Commissioner of the Australian Productivity Commission
- Peter Cullen, AO, FTSE (1943–2008), an ecologist, who served as a member of the Group until his death
- Richard Davis, a hydrologist who was a Chief Science Advisor to the Australian National Water Commission; and research scientist at CSIRO Australia
- Quentin Grafton, FASSA, Professor of Economics, ANU Public Policy Fellow, Fellow of the Asia and the Pacific Policy Society and director of the Centre for Water Economics, Environment and Policy (CWEEP) at the Crawford School of Public Policy at the Australian National University.
- Ronnie Harding, (1941–2022), a zoologist who was an Assistant Commissioner, NSW Natural Resources Commission; a former director, Institute of Environmental Studies, University of New South Wales
- David Lindenmayer, FAA, AO, a landscape ecologist at the Australian National University
- David Papps, AM, Former Commonwealth Environmental Water Holder 2012–2018
- Hugh Possingham, FAA, an applied mathematician with an interest in ecology and conservation biology
- Denis Saunders, AM, an ecologist who is the editor of Pacific Conservation Biology; and a former Chief Research Scientist, CSIRO Australia
- John Williams, FTSE, a hydrologist
- Mike Young, FASSA, an Australian economist and water policy expert, holds a Research Chair in Environmental and Water Policy at the University of Adelaide and is a Fellow of the Nicholas Institute for Environmental Policy Solutions at Duke University.

== See also ==
- Environmental issues in Australia
