= Orinduik =

Village in Potaro-Siparuni

- Village
- Location in Guayana
- Coordinates: 04°42′N 60°01′W
- Country: Guyana
- Region: Potaro-Siparuni
- Elevation: 1,972 ft (601 m)

Population (2012)
  - Total: 3

Orinduik is a diamond-mining community in the Potaro-Siparuni region of Guyana near the border with Brazil.

The diamond production has seen a steep decrease in the 21st century. Orinduik has a population of 3 people as of 2012.

Orinduik Falls is a popular tourist attraction. Orinduik Airport provides access to the area. It has a police station.
