= Monkey Mountain, Guyana =

Monkey Mountain Wandike
- Village
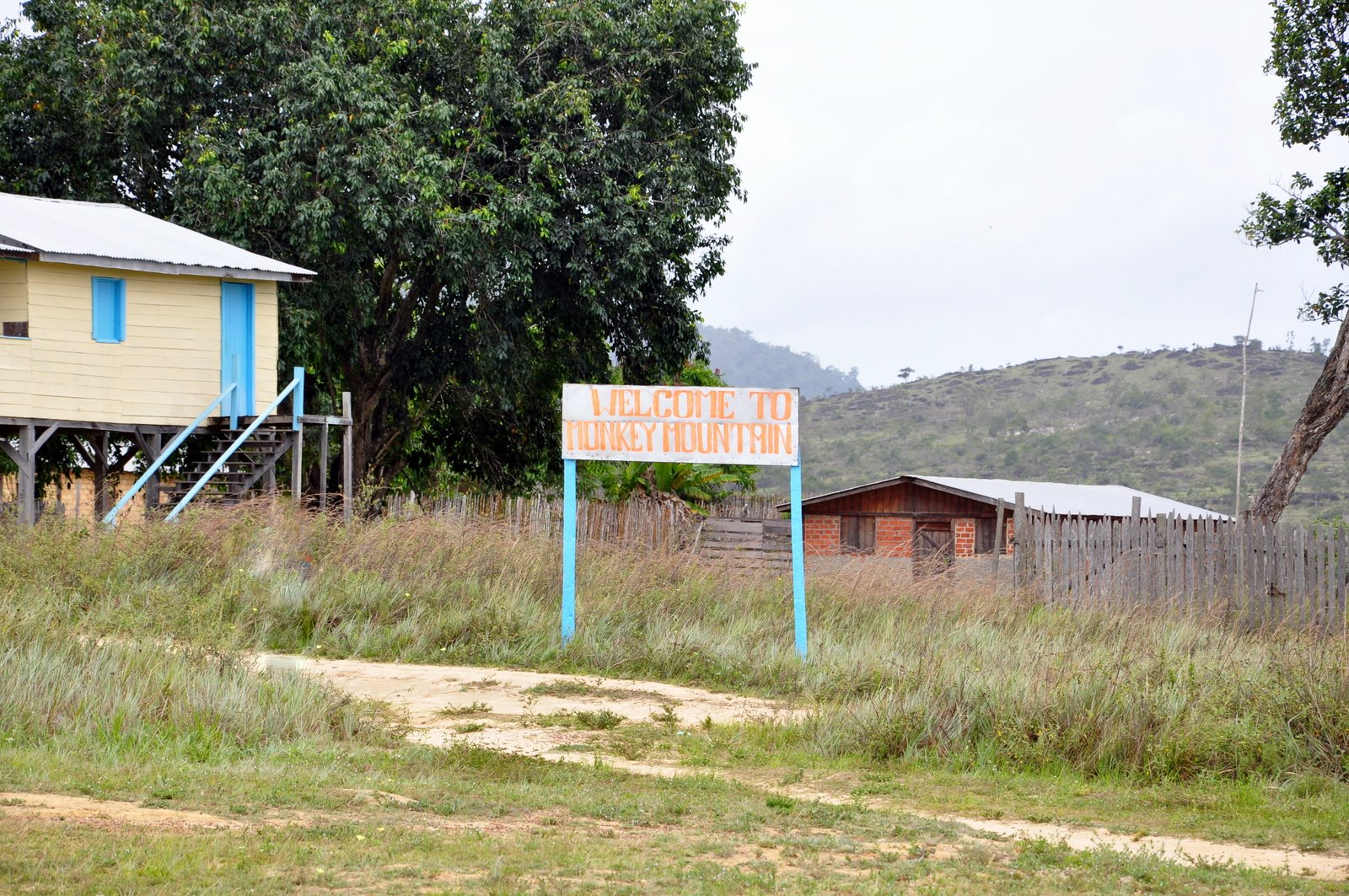

- Location in Guyana
- Coordinates: 4.4522°N 59.6028°W
- Country: Guyana
- Region: Potaro-Siparuni

Government
  - Toshao: Lincoln Singh
- Elevation: 1,700 ft (520 m)

Population (2012)
  - Total: 711

Monkey Mountain (also Wandike) is an Indigenous village in the Potaro-Siparuni Region of Guyana. The village is inhabited by the Patamona and Macushi tribes. Monkey Mountain is located near the Brazilian border. The village shares its name with the nearby mountain with a height of 591 metres (1,939 ft). The name is derived from the seasonal migration of monkeys on and around the nearby mountains.

== Overview ==
Monkey Mountain is located in the North Pakaraima Mountains, and lies at an altitude of 1,700 feet (520 m). The village has a school, a health centre, and a police station. The people in Monkey Mountain are multilingual, speaking Patamona, Macushi, Portuguese and English. The village received internet connection in 2019. The toshao (village chief) as of 2019 is Lincoln Singh.

A major attraction is the North Pakaraima Exposition, a two-day event with exhibits and sport competitions for the indigenous communities.

== Economy ==
The economy used to be based on subsistence farming, hunting and gathering. An important economic activity for the village is quarrying precious stones like crystals, amethyst, jasper and agate.

In 2018, a lapidary was built with government assistance and in cooperation with the villages of Kato, Kurukabaru, Maikwak, and Tuseneng. The lapidary will allow the villagers to process the stones themselves, and export jewellery.

== Transport ==
There is an unpaved road connection between Karasabai and Monkey Mountain. The main access is by air via the Monkey Mountain Airport located near the village.
