= Peter Cullen (scientist) =

Australian water scientist (1943–2008)

- Born: 18 May 1943; Melbourne, Victoria, Australia
- Died: 14 March 2008 (aged 64); Canberra, Australia
- Education: MAgrSc, DipEd (Melbourne)
- Occupation: Water scientist
- Spouse: Vicky Cullen
- Awards: AO FTSE, Hon DUniv (Canberra)

Peter Cullen AO FTSE, MAgrSc, DipEd (Melb), Hon DUniv (Canb), (18 May 1943 – 14 March 2008) was an Australian water scientist.

== Education ==
The son of an engineer, Cullen got his start as a water expert very early in life when his father moved to Tallangatta to oversee that town's relocation to accommodate an expanded Hume Dam. Cullen studied agricultural science at the University of Melbourne and soon turned to detailed studies of irrigation and the problems it can bring to the land it makes productive.

== Work ==
Cullen's major professional work was related to water in the environment, notably nutrient dynamics, freshwater and lake ecology, environmental flows, and catchment management.

Cullen retired from the University of Canberra in 2002 and actively continued his advocacy for water in the environment, notably as a founder of the Wentworth Group of Concerned Scientists, and as a regular interviewee on radio and television when water ecology was discussed.

== Honours ==
- Prime Minister's Prize for Environmentalist of the Year in 2001 for his work on the National Action Plan for Salinity and Water Quality
- Dean of Applied Science, University of Canberra
- South Australian Thinker in Residence, 2004
- Flinders University - Schultz Oration, 16 November 2007, the Flinders Research Centre for Coastal and Catchment Environments (FRCCCE), exploring water scarcity and futures for South Australia

== Memberships ==
- Founding Member, Wentworth Group of Concerned Scientists
- Commissioner, National Water Commission
- Member, Natural Heritage Trust Advisory Committee
- Chair, Scientific Advisory Panel, Lake Eyre Basin Ministerial Forum
- Chair, Victorian Water Trust Advisory Council
- Former director, Cooperative Research Centre for Freshwater Ecology (1993–2002), University of Canberra
- Former president, Federation of Australian Scientific and Technological Societies
- Member, International Water Academy
- Visiting Fellow, CSIRO Land and Water
- Director, Land and Water Australia
- Fellow of the Australian Academy of Technological Sciences and Engineering

== Tributes ==
Australian Greens Senator Rachel Siewert said, "Peter Cullen was a giant in terms of his contribution to natural resource management and water management in Australia.".

Dr Paul Sinclair from the Australian Conservation Foundation said, "there are academics who like to bang on in the ivory tower and there are academics who like to be down and dirty in the swamp. Peter Cullen... liked to be down and dirty in the swamp.... When he retired from his academic post, it appeared to me that there was ... no change in his work regime and he appeared to be busier than ever."

On the first anniversary of Peter Cullen's death, Senator Penny Wong (as Minister for Climate Change and Water) announced $1 million to establish a Peter Cullen Water and Environment Trust, stating,

"The creation of a perpetual legacy in name of Peter Cullen is a fitting tribute to this great Australian on the anniversary of his death a year ago today .. Professor Cullen made an enormous contribution to the management of natural resources in Australia, most of all around rivers and freshwater ecology .. As a founding National Water Commissioner, a leading member of the Wentworth Group of Concerned Scientists, and in his many other roles, Professor Cullen was an inspiring and influential leader in the important debate about water in this country"

In 2009, Land and Water Australia renamed their Eureka Prize - it became the 'Peter Cullen Eureka Prize for Water Research and Innovation'.

== Family ==
Cullen lived with his wife, Rev. Vicky Cullen, at their home at Gunning, New South Wales, where Vicky was the rector. Cullen was active in the Anglican Church of Australia, notably the Cursillo movement.

== Death ==
Cullen collapsed at his home on 11 March and, after a time at Goulburn hospital, was admitted to Canberra Hospital, where he died on 14 March 2008.
