= Paramakatoi =

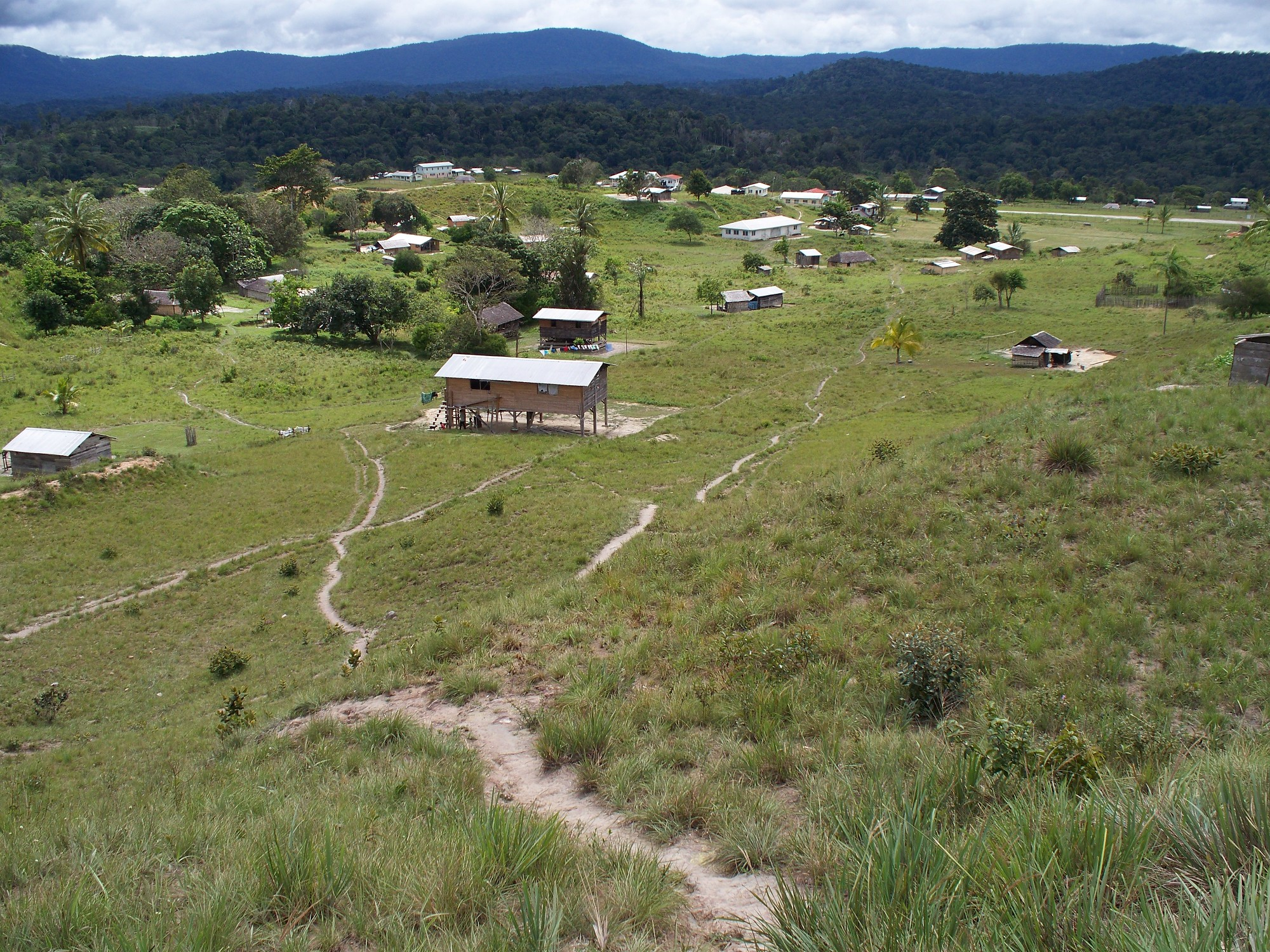

- Location in Guyana
- Coordinates: 4°43′N 59°42′W
- Country: Guyana
- Region: Potaro-Siparuni
- Elevation: 3,180 ft (970 m)

Population (2012)
  - Total: 1,423

Paramakatoi is an Amerindian community in the Potaro-Siparuni Region of Guyana, located in the Pacaraima Mountains. With an altitude of 970 metres (3,180 ft), it is 18 kilometres (11 mi) east of Kurukabaru.

The village name comes from the name of the nearby Palamakú yuk tree, which is surrounded by Palamakú trees, and "toi" means savannah in the Patamona language. "Palamakútoi" became "Paramakatoi" when missionaries arrived in the area.

== Description ==
Paramakatoi functions as a regional centre for the catchment area. It is the largest and most developed of the Amerindian communities in the region, and is home to the Patamona, Macushi and Wapishana tribes.

It has a secondary school and has participated in the Hinterland Employment Youth Service (HEYS) programme since 2016.

The village has a processing factory for sun-dried tomato products.

In 2019, Paramakatoi hosted a debate held in the Patamona language, in observance of the International Year of Indigenous Languages.

== Transport ==
Paramakatoi is served by the Paramakatoi Airport.
