= Tumatumari =

- Village
- Location in Guyana
- Coordinates: 5.2628°N 59.1483°W
- Country: Guyana
- Region: Potaro-Siparuni

Population (2012)
  - Total: 86

Tumatumari is a community in the Potaro-Siparuni region of Guyana, located around 15 km upstream from the confluence of the Potaro River and the Essequibo River.

The population as of 2012 is 86 people.
