= Campbelltown, Guyana =

Campbelltown
- Village
- Location in Guyana
- Coordinates: 5.2895°N 59.1557°W
- Country: Guyana
- Region: Potaro-Siparuni

Government
  - Toshao: Marbell Thomas (2018)

Population (2012)
  - Total: c.300

Campbelltown is an Amerindian village in the Potaro-Siparuni Region of Guyana, north of Mahdia. The village has been named after Stephen Campbell, the first Amerindian member of Parliament in Guyana.

== Overview ==
The village has merged with neighbouring Mahdia, and is not listed separately on the census. Even though Mahdia has a town status, Campbelltown is still governed by the Toshao.
