= Potaro-Siparuni =

Region of Guyana

Coordinates: 4.769702°N 59.265391°W

Potaro-Siparuni Region 8
- Administrative Region
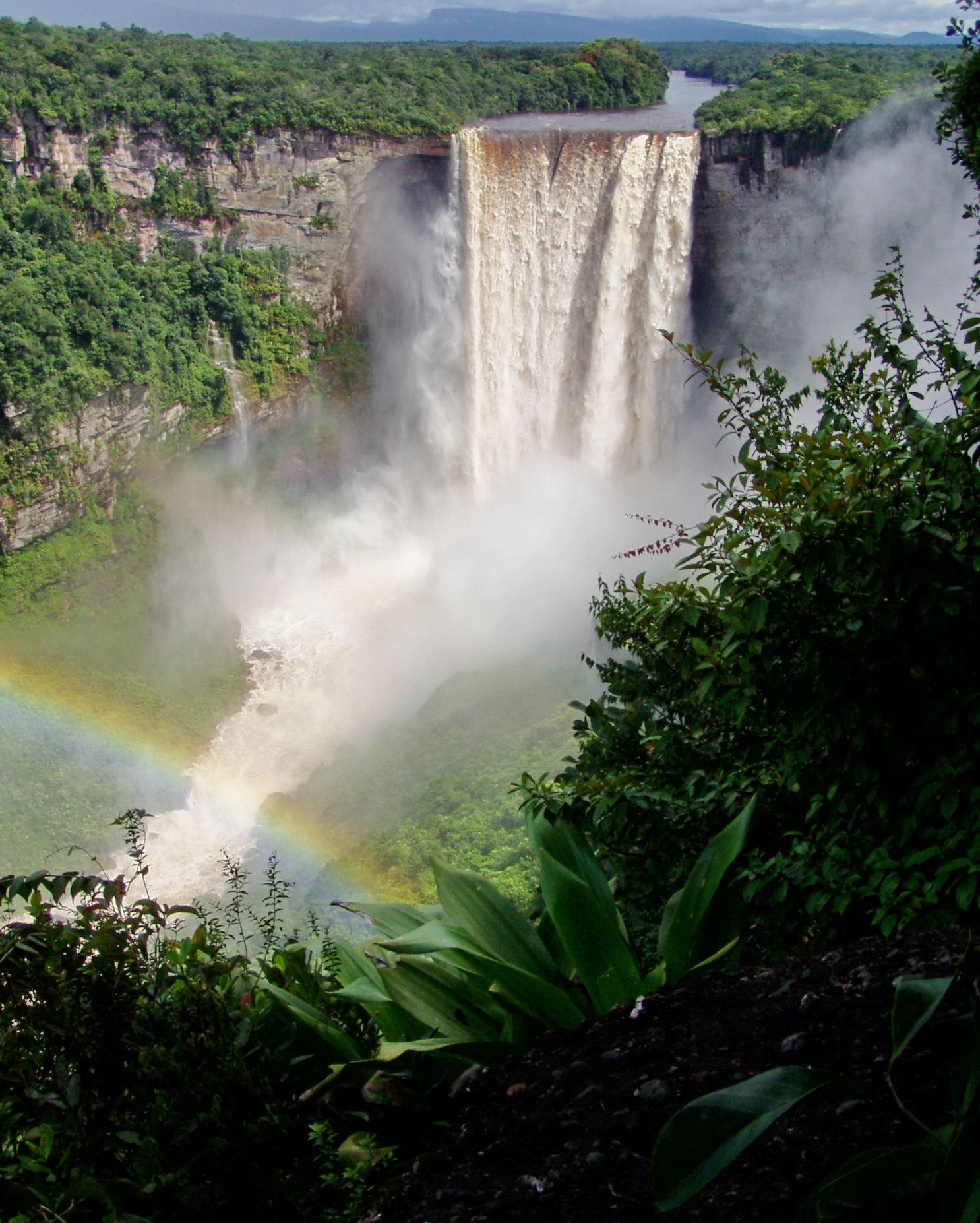

- Flag

- Map of Guyana showing Potaro-Siparuni region
- Country: Guyana; Claimed by Venezuela
- Regional Capital: Mahdia

Area
  - Total: 20,051 km^{2} (7,742 sq mi)

Population (2022 census)
  - Total: 13,598
  - Density: 0.67817/km^{2} (1.7565/sq mi)

Potaro-Siparuni (Region 8) is a region of Guyana. It borders the region of Cuyuni-Mazaruni to the north, the regions of Upper Demerara-Berbice and East Berbice-Corentyne to the east, the region of Upper Takutu-Upper Essequibo to the south and Brazil to the west.

The main villages in the region are Campbelltown, Orinduik, Mahdia, Paramakatoi and Tumatumari.

== Population ==
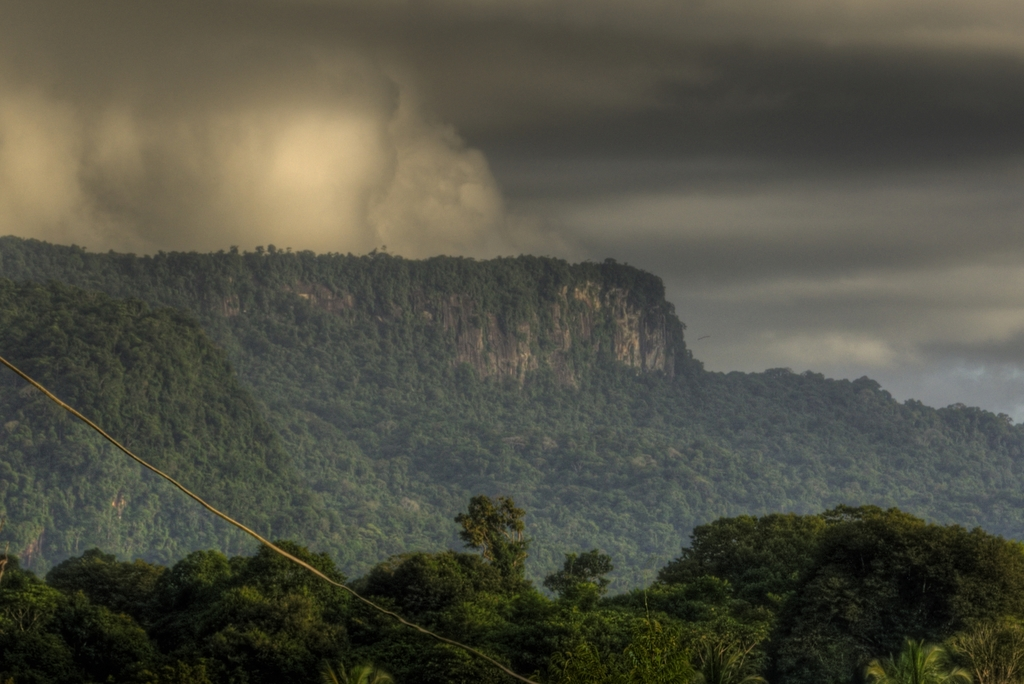
Hills in the South Mahdia, Potaro-Siparuni

The Government of Guyana has administered three official censuses since the 1980 administrative reforms, in 1980, 1991, 2002, 2012, and 2022. In 2012, the population of Potaro-Siparuni was recorded at 10,190 people. Official census records for the population of Potaro-Siparuni are as follows:

- 2022: 13,598
- 2012 : 10,190
- 2002 : 10,095
- 1991 : 5,616
- 1980 : 4,485

== Communities ==
Communities (including name variants):

- Arnik Village
- Campbelltown
- Itabac
- Kamana Village
- Kanapang Village
- Kato (Kato Village, Karto)
- Kopinang Mission
- Mahdia
- Micobie
- Monkey Mountain
- Orinduik
- Paramakatoi (Paramahatoi)
- Potaro Landing
- Taruka
- Tumatumari
- Tumatumari Landing
- Waipa Village

== Tourism ==
Kaieteur Falls is a major tourist attraction in Guyana. It is in Kaieteur National Park in the centre of Guyana's rainforest. The park is served by Kaieteur International Airport, about a 15-minute walk from the top of Kaieteur Falls, with frequent flights to Ogle Airport and Cheddi Jagan International Airport in Georgetown. Within Potaro-Siparuni is also a section of the Amazon rainforest.

== Territorial claim ==
Venezuela has attempted to renew its claim to Guyana's Essequibo territory, which is situated west of the Essequibo River. The status of the border controversy is subject to the Geneva Agreement, which was signed by the United Kingdom, Venezuela, and British Guiana on 17 February 1966.

As of December 2020, the matter is being addressed by the ICJ. Pending its final decision, the ICJ indicated the following provisional measures in its Order of 1 December 2023:

(1) The Bolivarian Republic of Venezuela shall refrain from taking any action which would modify the situation that currently prevails in the territory in dispute, whereby the Co-operative Republic of Guyana administers and exercises control over that area;

(2) Both Parties shall refrain from any action which might aggravate or extend the dispute before the Court or make it more difficult to resolve.

== See also ==
- Amaila Falls
- Kaieteur Falls
- Kaieteur National Park
