= Apure (disambiguation) =

Apure may refer to:

== In Venezuela ==
- Apure Province (1830 to 1864)
- Apure State
- Alto Apure District
- Apure River
- San Fernando de Apure, a city

== In Gran Colombia ==
- Apure Province (17 July 1823 - 1864)
- Apure Department (1824–1830)
- La Campaña de Apure
