= Achaguas (disambiguation) =

Achaguas is a small town in Apure State in Venezuela, in the Achaguas Municipality.

Achaguas may also refer to:

- Achaguas Municipality, one of the seven municipalities (municipios) that makes up the Venezuelan state of Apure
- Achaguas Province, a former Venezuelan province known as Apure Province from 1823 to 1864
- Achagua people, an ethnic group of Colombia and Venezuela

== See also ==
- Achagua (disambiguation)
