= Pedro Camejo =

Venezuelan soldier (1790–1821)

Pedro Felipe Camejo
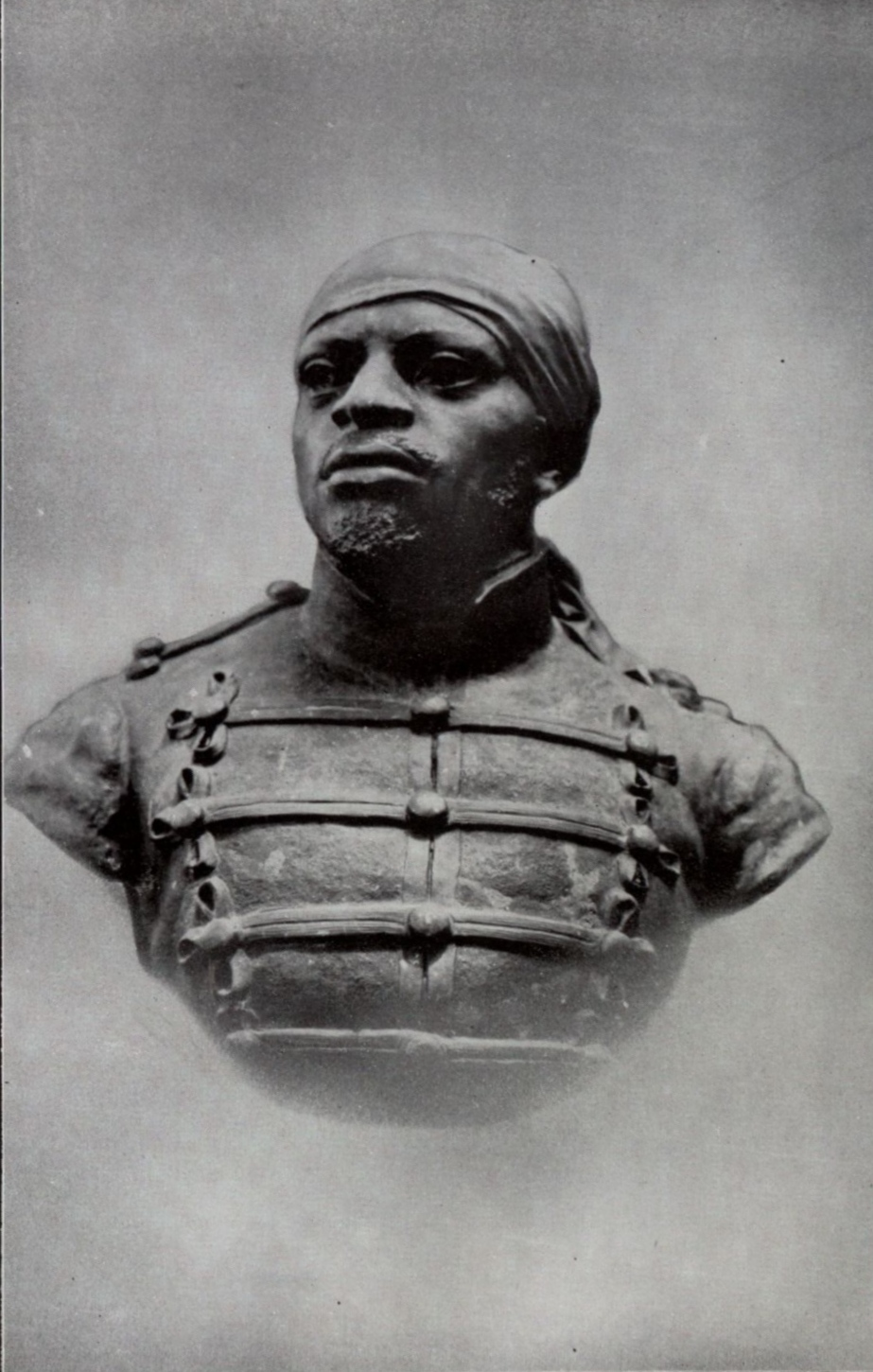
- Born: March 30, 1790; San Juan de Payara, Captaincy General of Venezuela, Spanish Empire
- Died: June 24, 1821 (aged 31); Tocuyito, Gran Colombia
- Military career
- Allegiance: Gran Colombia
- Service years: 1809 - 1821
- Rank: Lieutenant
- Nickname: Negro Primero
- Conflicts: Venezuelan War of Independence Battle of Las Queseras del Medio Battle of Carabobo
- Awards: Order of the Liberators

Pedro Camejo, also known as Negro Primero ("The First Black"), was a Venezuelan soldier that fought with the Royal Army and later with the Independence Army during the Venezuelan War of Independence, reaching the rank of lieutenant in the army of Simón Bolívar. The nickname Negro Primero was inspired by his bravery and skill in handling spears, and because he was always in the first line of attack on the battlefield.

== Biography ==
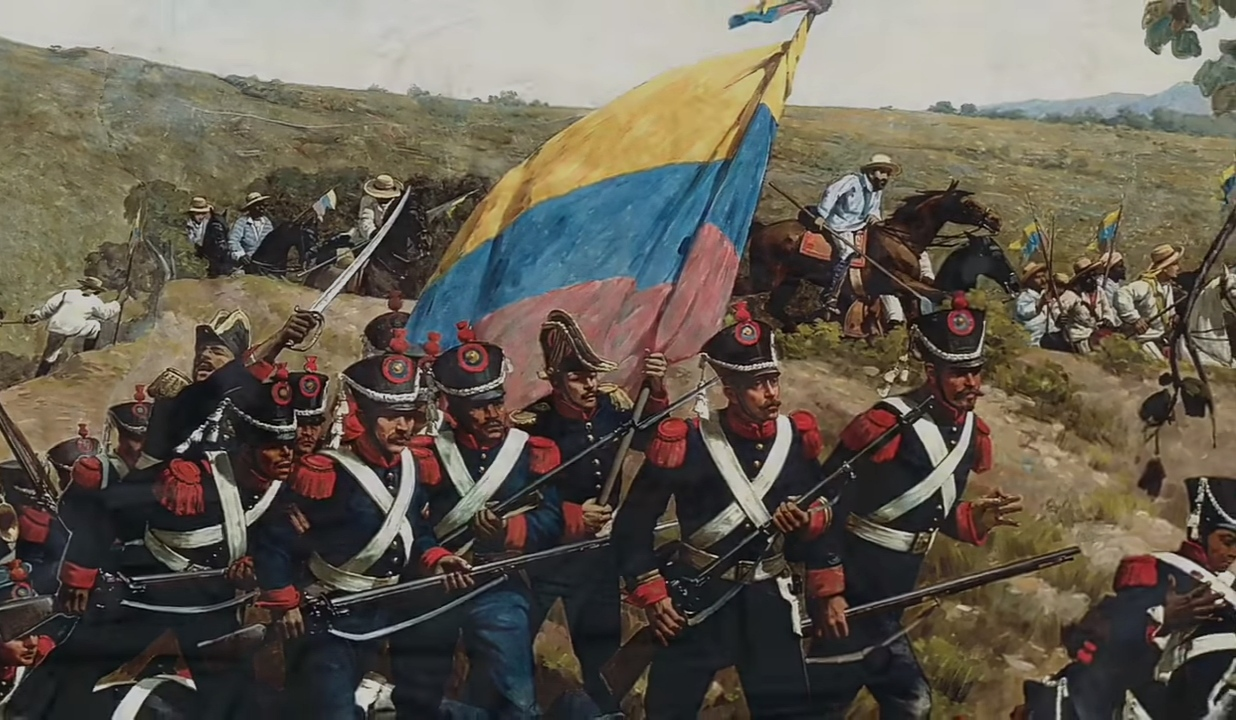
Battle of Carabobo, oil painting by Martín Tovar y Tovar, Pedro Camejo lies dead in full dress uniform at the far bottom right.

Pedro Camejo was born a slave, property of a Spanish royalist Vincente Alonzo on March 30, 1790, in San Juan de Payara. He gained his freedom in 1816 after enlisting in the military to fight in the war for independence. Camejo was one of the 150 lancers who participated in the Battle of Las Queseras del Medio, later receiving the Order of Liberators of Venezuela for his participation. In the Battle of Carabobo, he fought with one of the cavalry regiments of the first division commanded by José Antonio Páez. Eduardo Blanco, in his book Venezuela Heroica, describes the moment when Camejo presented himself before General Páez with an unfailing voice said to him: "My general, I come to tell you goodbye, because I am dead".
