= Pedro Camejo Municipality =

Pedro Camejo Municipality Municipio Pedro Camejo
- Municipality
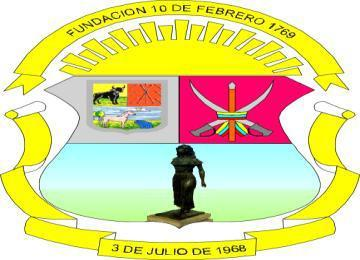
- Flag Coat of arms

- Location in Apure

- Location in Venezuela
- Coordinates: 6°53′18″N 67°34′27″W
- Country: Venezuela
- State: Apure

Government
  - Mayor: José Cabrera Cuervo (PSUV)

Area
  - Total: 20,762.0 km^{2} (8,016.3 sq mi)

Population (2011)
  - Total: 28,966
  - Density: 1.3951/km^{2} (3.6134/sq mi)
- Time zone: UTC−4 (VET)
- Area code(s): 0247

The Pedro Camejo Municipality is one of the seven municipalities (municipios) that makes up the Venezuelan state of Apure and, according to the 2011 census by the National Institute of Statistics of Venezuela, the municipality has a population of 28,966. The town of San Juan de Payara is the municipal seat of the Pedro Camejo Municipality. The municipality is named after Afro-Venezuelan independence hero Pedro Camejo.

== Demographics ==
The Pedro Camejo Municipality, according to a 2007 population estimate by the National Institute of Statistics of Venezuela, has a population of 31,187 (up from 26,407 in 2000). This amounts to 6.5% of the state's population. The municipality's population density is 1.52 inhabitants per square kilometre (3.9/sq mi).

== Government ==
The mayor of the Pedro Camejo Municipality is Pedro Danilo Leal, re-elected November 23, 2008 with 56% of the vote. The municipality is divided into three parishes; Urbana San Juan de Payara, Codazzi, and Cunaviche.
