= Pachano =

Pachano is a surname. Notable people with the surname include:

- Aníbal Pachano (born 1955), Argentine choreographer
- Jacinto Regino Pachano (1835–1903), Venezuelan military person
- Sofía Pachano (born 1988), Argentine dancer and actress
