= Tortuga Arrau Wildlife Refuge =

- Refugio de Fauna Silvestre de la Tortuga Arrau
- IUCN category IV (habitat/species management area)
- Interactive map of Tortuga Arrau Wildlife Refuge
- Location: Apure and Bolívar states, Venezuela
- Area: 17,431 hectares (174.31 km^{2})
- Established: 1989

Tortuga Arrau Wildlife Refuge is a protected natural reserve located along the middle of Orinoco River in the Apure and Bolivar states of Venezuela. It protects critical sandy nesting beaches and shallow waters for the giant South American river turtle (Podocnemis expansa).

== Description ==
The Natural Reserve has three islands: Isla Pantalla, Isla Pararuma, and Isla Ramonera. Isla Pantalla is located in Apure State, while Isla Pararuma and Isla Ramonera are located in the State of Bolívar. At the edge of the reserve, there is a small cape named Cape Ollita. The reserve is divided into several strictly protected legal zones along the Middle Orinoco River, including Laja Larga, La Ollita, and La Pica. At the northern edge of the refuge, there is a small riverside community named Santa María del Orinoco. This community also houses the administrative center of the natural reserve.

== External Link ==
https://www.openstreetmap.org/relation/13541586
