= Battle of Las Queseras del Medio =

1813 Venezuelan War of Independence battle

- Part of Venezuelan War of Independence
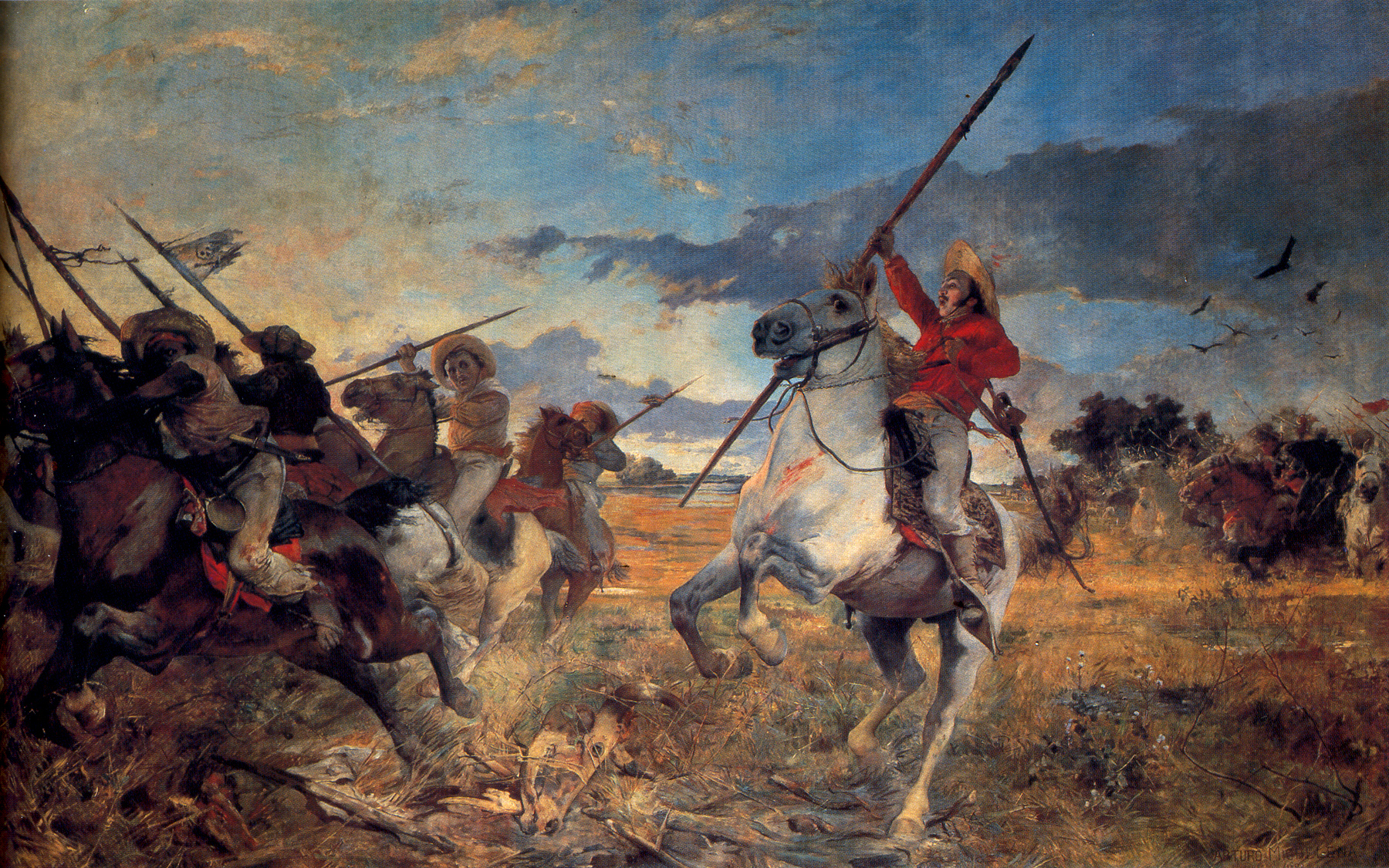
- Arturo Michelena, Vuelvan Caras. The painting depicts the incident in which José Antonio Páez ordered his llaneros to turn around and attack the Spanish cavalry that was pursuing them.
Date	April 2, 1819
Location	Queseras del Medio, Achaguas Municipality, Apure 7°42′25″N 67°58′47″W
Result	Patriot victory

Belligerents
Venezuelan Patriots	Spain; Venezuelan Royalists

Commanders and leaders
José Antonio Páez	Pablo Morillo

Strength
153 cavalry	1,200 cavalry

Casualties and losses
2 dead, 6 wounded	400 dead

The Battle of Las Queseras del Medio was an important battle of the Venezuelan War of Independence. It took place on April 2, 1819. The forces of José Antonio Páez consisted of 153 mounted llanero lancers. They were pitted against more than 1,000 Spanish cavalry. The battle is noted for a phrase of Páez's that became famous: ¡Vuelvan caras! (“About face!”) –although some sources state that he actually said ¡Vuelvan, carajo! (“Get back [to the battle], damn it!”).

== Background ==
In April 1819, Bolívar met the cavalry division of General Páez encamped on the southern bank of the Arauca River, a major tributary of the Orinoco in the Apure plains, about 300 miles south of Caracas. Together Paez's llaneros and Bolívar's troops numbered about 3,000 men. The army of Spanish General Pablo Morillo, which was stationed across the river at "Las Queseras del Medio", about a mile from its banks, was 6,000 strong.

== Battle ==
Paez took command of 153 llaneros and with their horses crossed the river swimming to a point some two miles above Morillo's encampment. Upon reaching the protection of the steep river bank on the opposite side, Páez formed his men into six or seven platoons and advanced into the open savannah.

On seeing Páez, Morillo organized his forces. He placed a vanguard of 800 cavalry armed with lances and 200 cavalry armed with carbines in the center with his infantry and artillery. Morillo then charged with the vanguard.

Páez and his men retreated in the direction where one of Bolivar's infantry units was stationed. Morillo's cavalry tried to surround Páez by flanking him on both sides. Páez ordered one of his platoons to attack the infantry in the center. The purpose of this action was to force the two flanking cavalry columns to come together, at which moment Páez would pull back his men to avoid being enveloped. The maneuver was well executed and with great speed, creating pandemonium in the royalists ranks, while withdrawing before the two wings of the Spanish cavalry closed ranks into a solid mass.

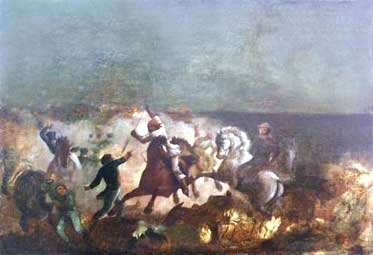
Las Queseras del Medio. Arturo Michelena

It was, at this point, with the Spanish cavalry in full pursuit, that Páez gave his famous order, ¡Vuelvan caras! (turn around, or about-face) and ordered all his llaneros to fall back upon the disconcerted enemy. Many contemporary historians believe the actual phrase he said was the more vulgar ¡Vuelvan, carajo! ("go back, damn it!"), but that the more proper caras was substituted in earlier sources for the expletive carajo. The Spanish cavalry, confused, turned around in panic and fled, leaving a trail of casualties in their wake. Spanish casualties amounted to 400 dead, while Páez lost 8 men in the action.

After the battle Bolívar awarded Páez and his men with the Cruz de los Libertadores (Cross of the Liberators). Pedro Camejo had been involved in this battle as one of Páez's lancers.

Narciso López fought on the Spanish side of this battle.
