= Achagua =

Achagua or Axagua may refer to:

- Achagua people, an ethnic group of Colombia and Venezuela
- Achagua language, a language of Colombia
- Achagua (moth), a geometer moth genus of the tribe Nacophorini

== See also ==
- Achaguas (disambiguation)
- Xagua (disambiguation)
