= Biruaca Municipality =

Biruaca Municipality Municipio Biruaca
- Municipality
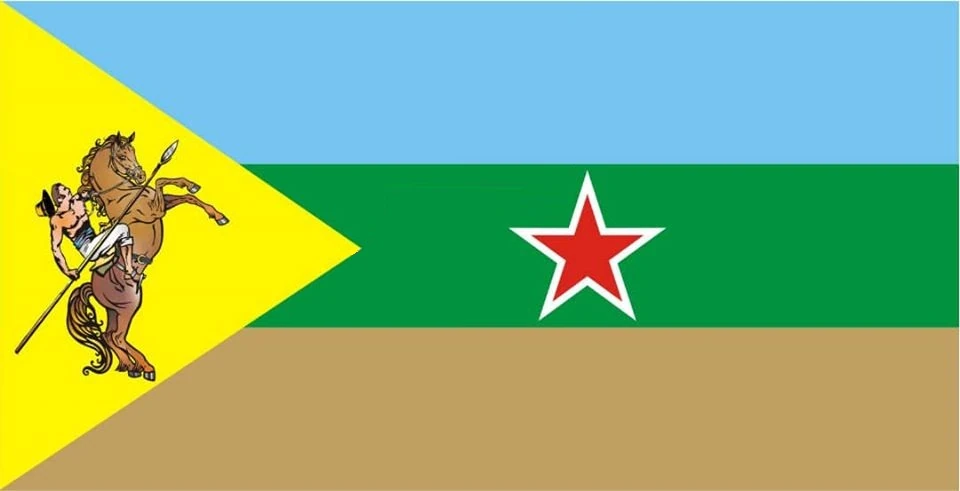
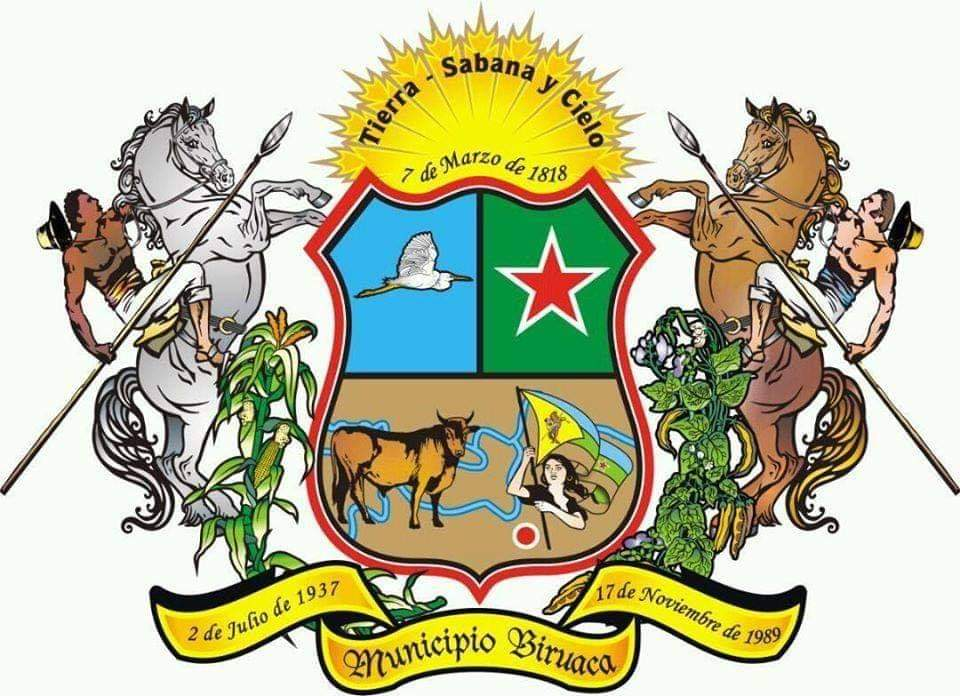
- Flag Coat of arms

- Location in Apure

- Location in Venezuela
- Coordinates: 7°48′35″N 67°40′23″W
- Country: Venezuela
- State: Apure

Government
  - Mayor: José Franco Martínez (PSUV)

Area
  - Total: 1,120.4 km^{2} (432.6 sq mi)

Population (2011)
  - Total: 54,323
  - Density: 48.485/km^{2} (125.58/sq mi)
- Time zone: UTC−4 (VET)
- Area code(s): 0247

The Biruaca Municipality is one of the seven municipalities (municipios) that makes up the Venezuelan state of Apure and, according to the 2011 census by the National Institute of Statistics of Venezuela, the municipality has a population of 54,323. The town of Biruaca is the municipal seat of the Biruaca Municipality.

== Demographics ==
The Biruaca Municipality, according to a 2007 population estimate by the National Institute of Statistics of Venezuela, has a population of 54,233 (up from 45,180 in 2000). This amounts to 11.4% of the state's population. The municipality's population density is 42.34 inhabitants per square kilometre (109.7/sq mi).

== Government ==
The mayor of the Biruaca Municipality is Daniel Blanco, re-elected November 23, 2008 with 38% of the vote. The municipality contains one parish; Urbana Biruaca.

== Climate ==
Minimum monthly temperature in the Biruaca municipality lies between 21.2 and 23.9 °C, while maximum temperature is between 29.2 and 35.3 °C. Total annual precipitation fluctuates between 1336 and 1820 mm. Most rain falls between June and August, while the driest quarter comprises January to March.
