= Sagua =

Sagua may refer to:

== Settlements ==
- Sagua la Grande, a municipality in the Province of Villa Clara, Cuba
- Sagua de Tánamo, a municipality in the Province of Holguín, Cuba
- Sagua la Chica, a village in the municipality of Camajuaní, Villa Clara Province, Cuba
- Isabela de Sagua, a village in the municipality of Sagua la Grande, Villa Clara Province, Cuba

== Rivers and mountains ==
- Sagua River, a river in Guam
- Sagua la Grande River, the second longest Cuban river, in Villa Clara Province
- Sagua la Chica River, a Cuban river in Villa Clara Province
- Sagua de Tánamo River, a Cuban river in Holguín Province
- Nipe-Sagua-Baracoa, a mountain range of southwestern Cuba

== See also ==
- Sauga, a borough in Estonia
- Xagua (disambiguation)
