= Santos Luzardo National Park =

Protected area of Apure State, Venezuela

Santos Luzardo National Park Parque Nacional Santos Luzardo
- IUCN category II (national park)
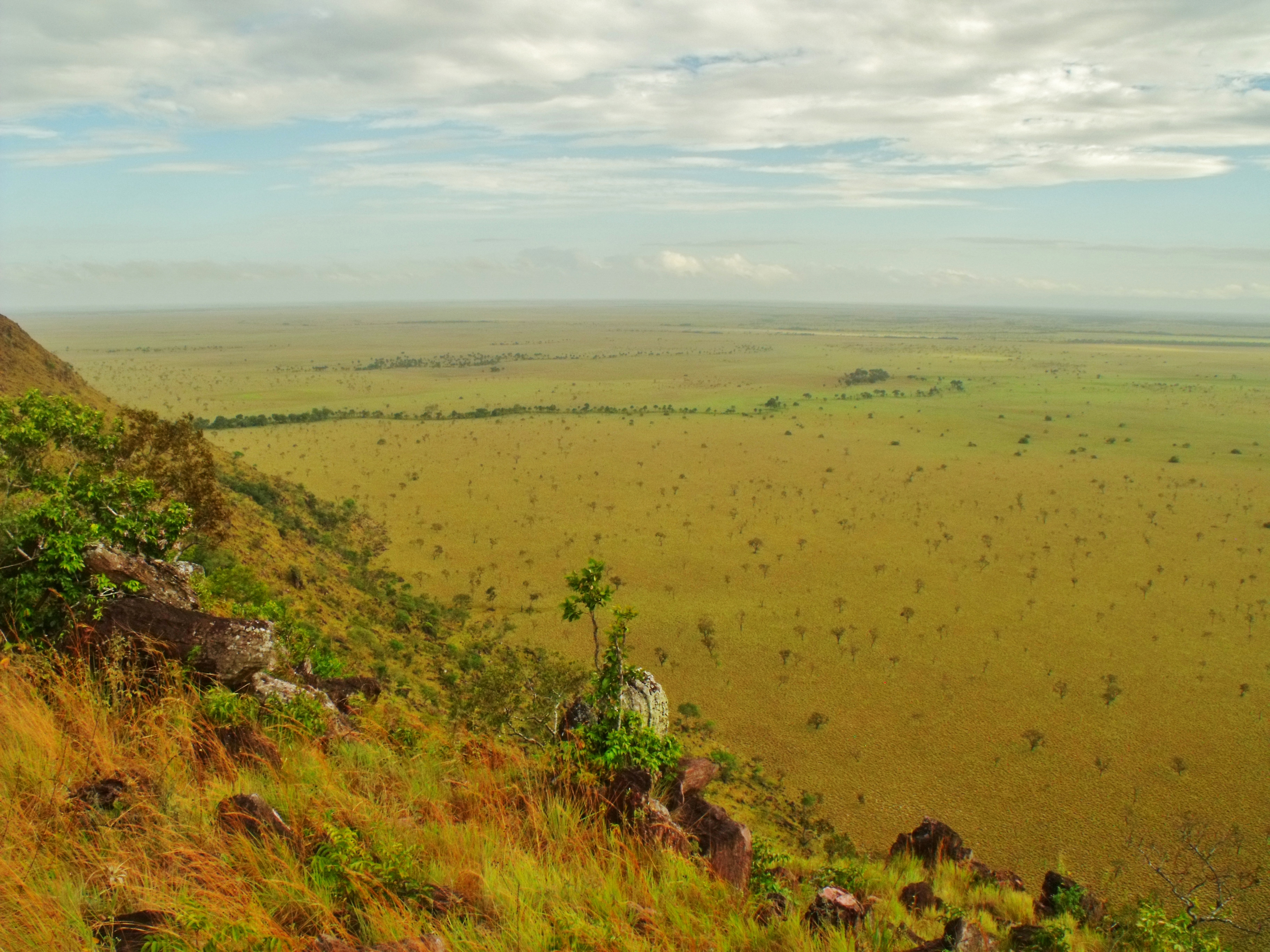

- Location within Venezuela
- Location: Venezuela
- Coordinates: 6°42′N 67°34′W
- Area: 5,844 km^{2} (2,256 sq mi)
- Established: February 24, 1988

The Santos Luzardo National Park (Spanish: Parque nacional Santos Luzardo) Also Cinaruco-Capanaparo National Park It is a protected area with the status of national park that is located between the rivers Capanaparo and Cinaruco and the confluence of them with the Orinoco river, in jurisdiction of the Municipalities Pedro Camejo and Achaguas of the Apure State in Venezuela, near the border with Colombia.

The park was created in 1988 by presidential decree by President Jaime Lusinchi and is protected by the National Institute of Parks of Venezuela (INPARQUES), which assumes a systematic policy of conservation and preservation of the natural resources of the park.

The park has a variety of flora including Saladillo, conger, oak, caramacate, drago, saman, coconut monkey and cañafístula, among other plants.

== Gallery ==
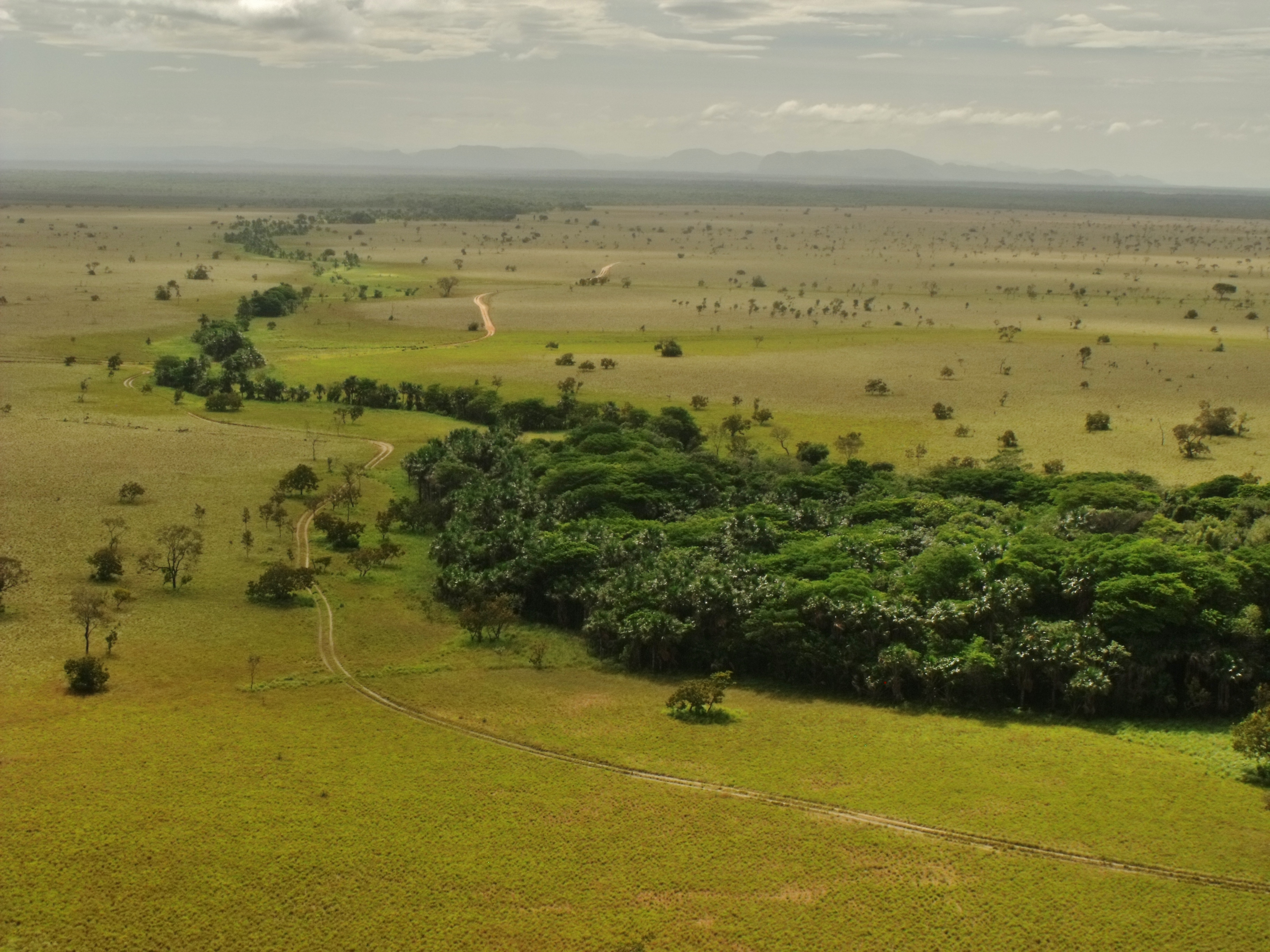

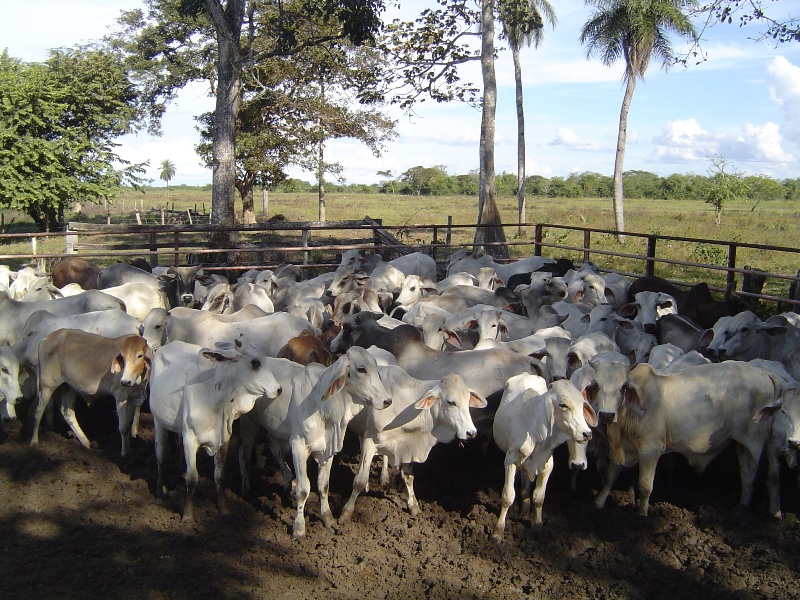

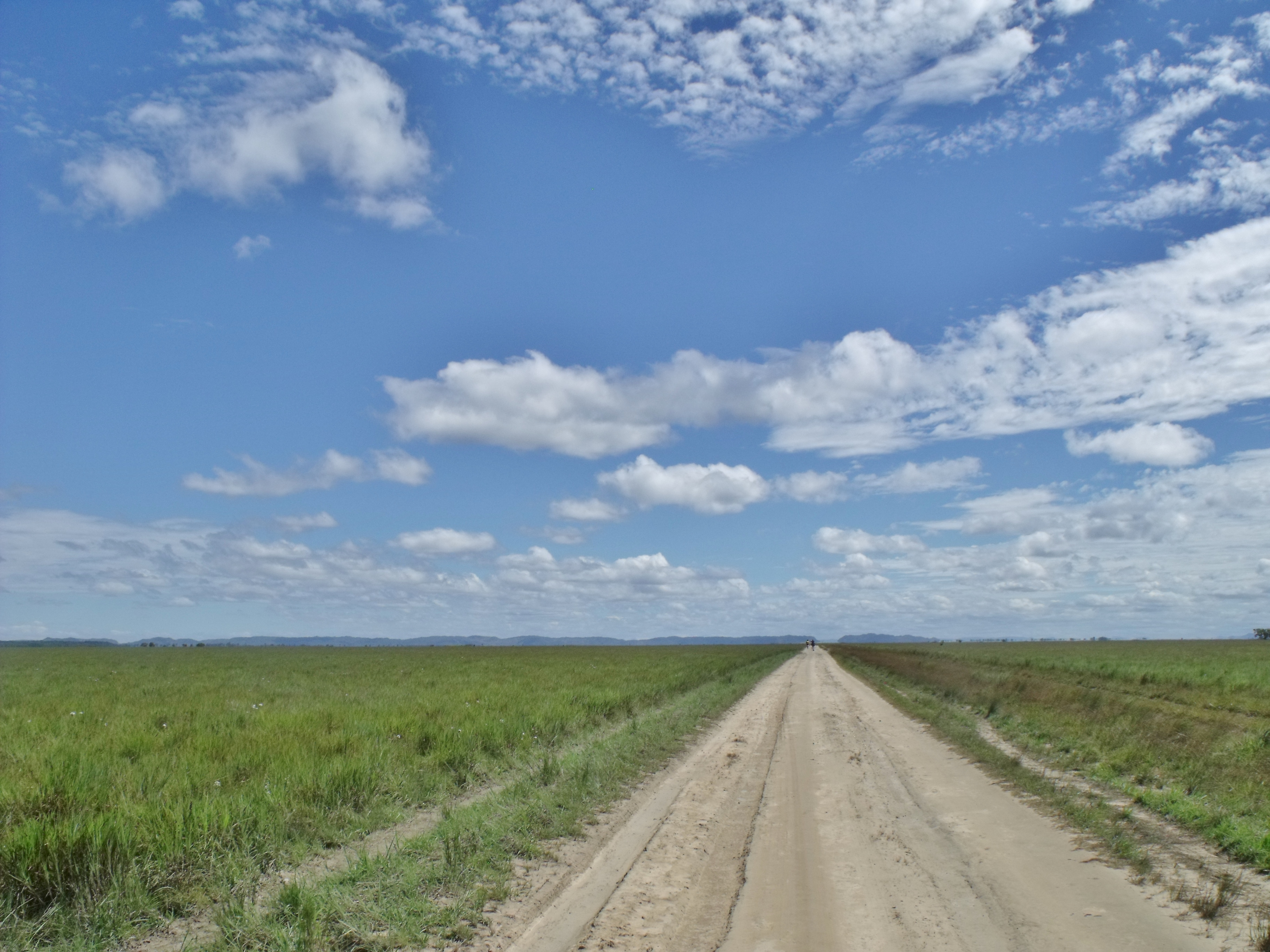

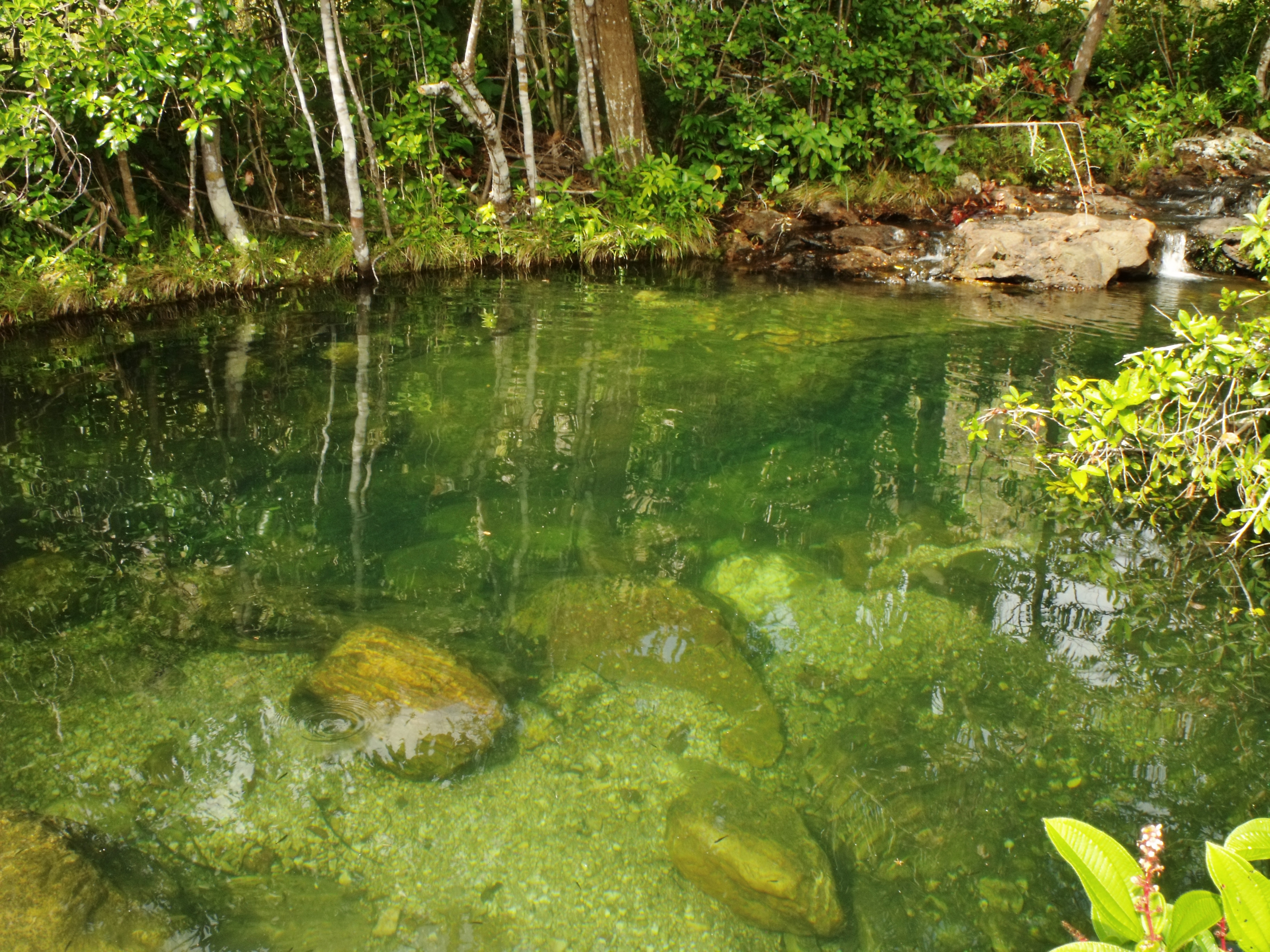

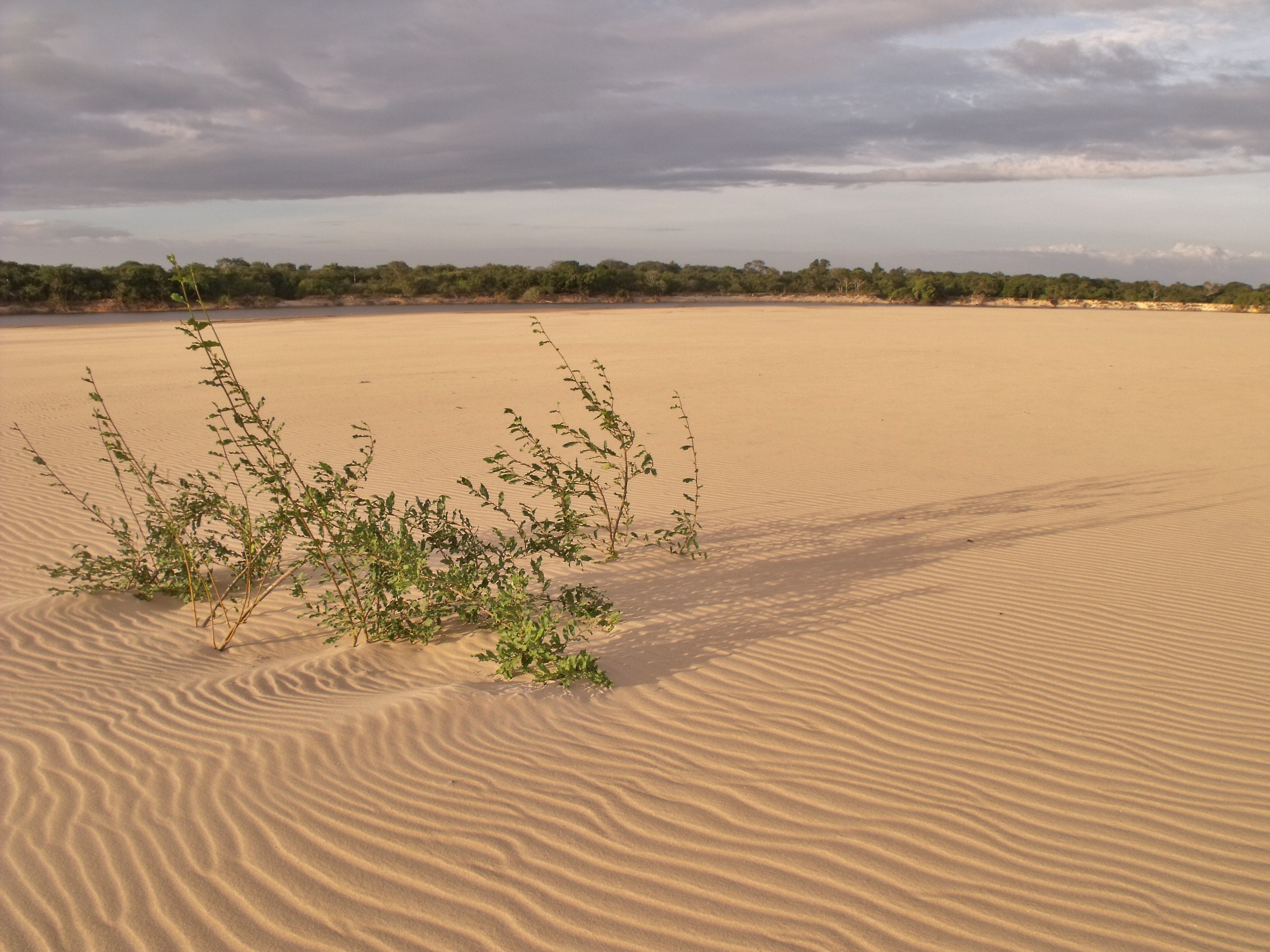

== See also ==
- List of national parks of Venezuela
- Los Roques National Park
