= Muñoz Municipality =

Muñoz Municipality Municipio Muñoz
- Municipality
- Flag

- Location in Apure

- Location in Venezuela
- Coordinates: 7°38′00″N 69°15′58″W
- Country: Venezuela
- State: Apure
- Municipal seat: Bruzual

Government
  - Mayor: Jesús Bona Arraíz (PSUV)

Area
  - Total: 7,759.5 km^{2} (2,996.0 sq mi)

Population (2011)
  - Total: 27,542
  - Density: 3.5495/km^{2} (9.1930/sq mi)
- Time zone: UTC−4 (VET)
- Area code(s): 0240
- Website: Official website

The Muñoz Municipality is one of the seven municipalities (municipios) that makes up the Venezuelan state of Apure and, according to the 2011 census by the National Institute of Statistics of Venezuela, the municipality has a population of 27,542. The town of Bruzual is the municipal seat of the Muñoz Municipality. The municipality is named for Major General José Cornelio Muñoz, leader of a division of independence forces during the Venezuelan War of Independence.

== Demographics ==
The Muñoz Municipality, according to a 2007 population estimate by the National Institute of Statistics of Venezuela, has a population of 30,197 (up from 26,141 in 2000). This amounts to 6.4% of the state's population. The municipality's population density is 3.81 inhabitants per square kilometre (9.9/sq mi).

== Government ==
The mayor of the Muñoz Municipality is Ramón de Jesús Bona Arraíz, re-elected November 23, 2008 with 58% of the vote. The municipality is divided into five parishes; Urbana Bruzual, Mantecal, Quintero, Rincón Hondo, and San Vicente.
