= Xagua =

Xagua may refer to:

- Xagua (tree), native to the tropical Americas
- Xagua language, or Achagua, a language of Colombia
- Xagua people, or Achagua, an ethnic group of Colombia

== See also ==
- Jagua (disambiguation)
- Sagua (disambiguation)
