= Nazareno de Achaguas =

Statue in Venezuela

Nazareno de Achaguas is a nineteenth-century wooden statue of Jesus Christ in the town of Achaguas, Venezuela. It was commissioned by José Antonio Páez. In 2014 it was given a heritage listing (Bien de Interés Cultural) by the Venezuelan Ministry of Culture.

== See also ==
- List of statues of Jesus
