= Venezuela Heroica =

1881 novel by Eduardo Blanco

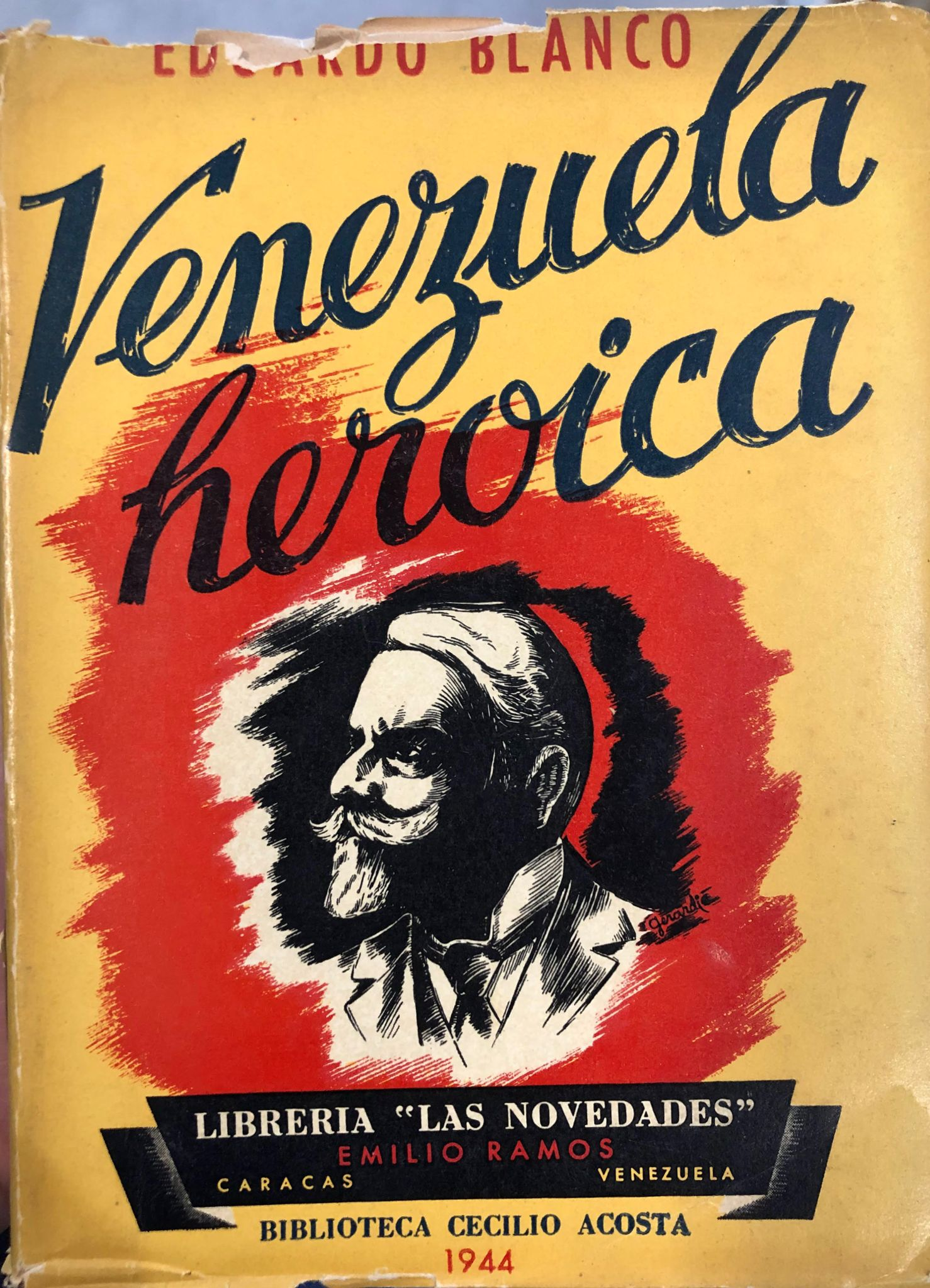
- 1944 edition of Venezuela Heroica
- Author: Eduardo Blanco
- Language: Spanish
- Subject: Venezuelan War of Independence
- Genre: Epic
- Publication date: 1881 (first edition); 1883 (second edition)
- Publication place: Venezuela
- Pages: 352

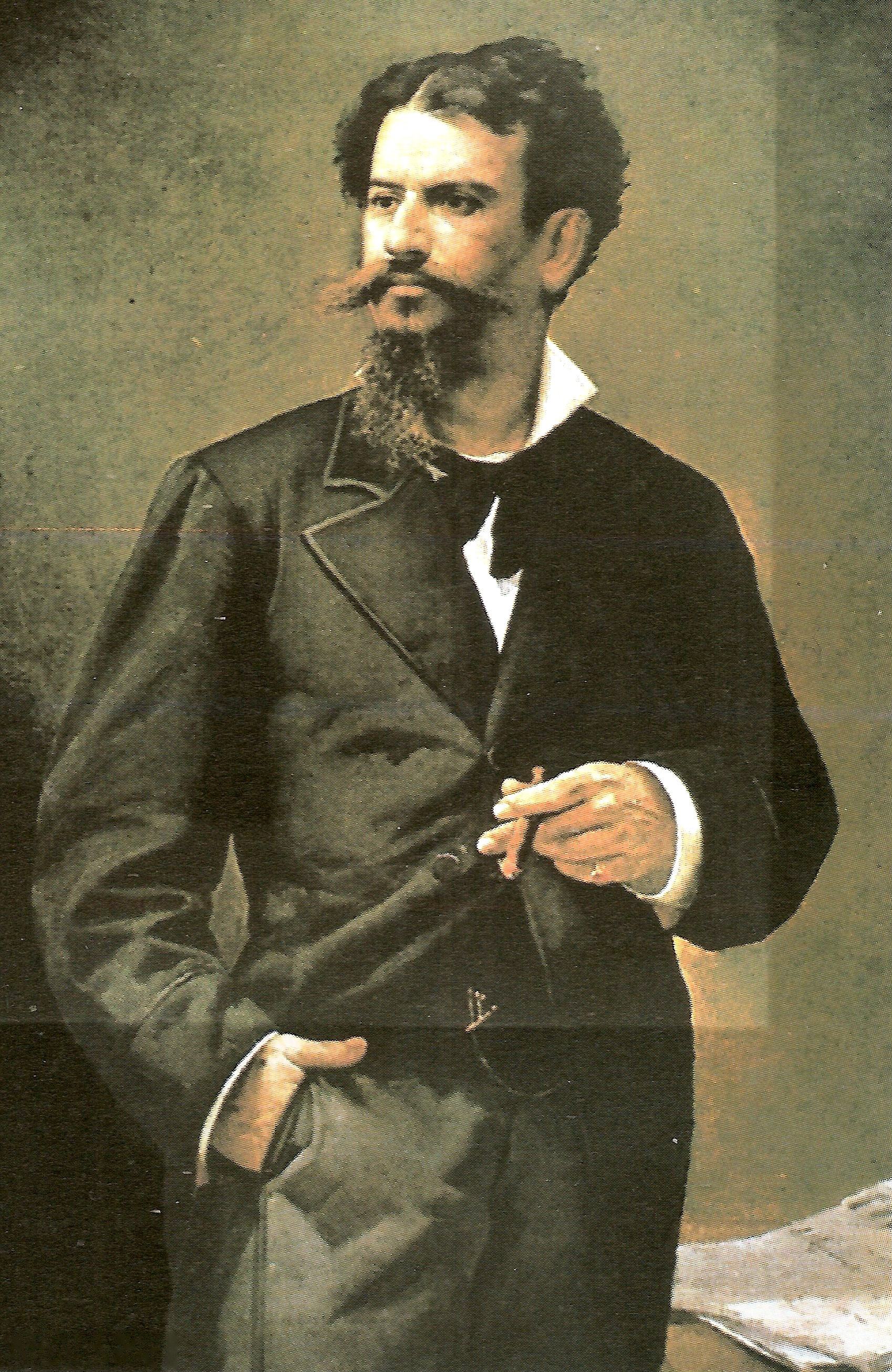
Eduardo Blanco

Venezuela Heroica (English: "Heroic Venezuela") is an epic novel written by Venezuelan author Eduardo Blanco and published in 1881, with an expanded second edition in 1883. It is Blanco's main work, and presents a classic romantic view of history as an epic. Venezuela Heroica is structured in five vignettes that depict the main battles and heroes of the Venezuelan War of Independence. It was from General José Antonio Páez himself that Blanco heard the stories of the Battle of Carabobo, during an encounter with Marshal Juan Crisóstomo Falcón to end the Federal War (1859–1863) near the site of the battle. Páez was so moved from his memories of youth, the anecdote goes, that he could not stop telling his aide-de-camp, Blanco, the details of the battle. It was Falcón who then told Blanco "you are listening to the Iliad from the very lips of Achilles".

== Structure ==
Venezuela Heroica is written in prose. It is a story about the country’s emancipation in which the author uses his skill to portray the bloody war while paying tribute to the deeds of those who successfully and unrelentingly fought for Venezuelan freedom.

The first edition is structured in five vignettes that depict the most memorable battles, those of La Victoria, San Mateo, Las Queseras del Medio, Boyacá and Carabobo. It was from General José Antonio Páez himself that Blanco heard the stories of the Battle of Carabobo, during an encounter with Marshal Juan Crisóstomo Falcón to end the Federal War (1859–1863) near the site of the battle. Páez was so moved by his memories of youth, the anecdote goes, that he could not stop telling his aide (Blanco) the details of the battle. It was Falcón who then told Blanco "you are listening to the Iliad from the very lips of Achilles".

In the second edition, six further battles have been added: Sitio de Valencia de Venezuela, Maturín, La invasión de los Seiscientos, La Casa Fuerte, San Félix and Matasiete.

== Genre ==
=== Romanticism ===
All the critics and historians of Venezuelan literature agree that Venezuela Heroica is a work with clear Romantic characteristics. The style is subjective and Blanco bases the narrative events in the world of historic Venezuelan facts. By using a revealing and exciting tone and also expressive devices, his intention is to impact the reader and amongst other things, to justify the work being considered a declaration of literary Venezuelan romance.

=== Epic ===
The epic tone of Venezuela Heroica succeeds through the use of wide coverage of space and time and lyrically with its basis of comparisons, epiphanies, hyperboles and other devices. The wideness in space succeeds by highlighting the heroes in relation to the people around them. Each hero is portrayed in relation to their own environment with interactions between them and other heroes. As regards the development of time, the events are often magnified through comparison with specific facts from the past, from antiquity or the Middle Ages, and this contributes to give a greater dimension.

== Adaptations ==
Venezuela Heroica was adapted into a seven-episode animated series for children, produced by Estudio Metrópolis and broadcast in 2012 by ViVe and later by 123TV.

== See also ==
- Venezuelan literature
