= Bruzual =

City in Apure State, Venezuela

- City
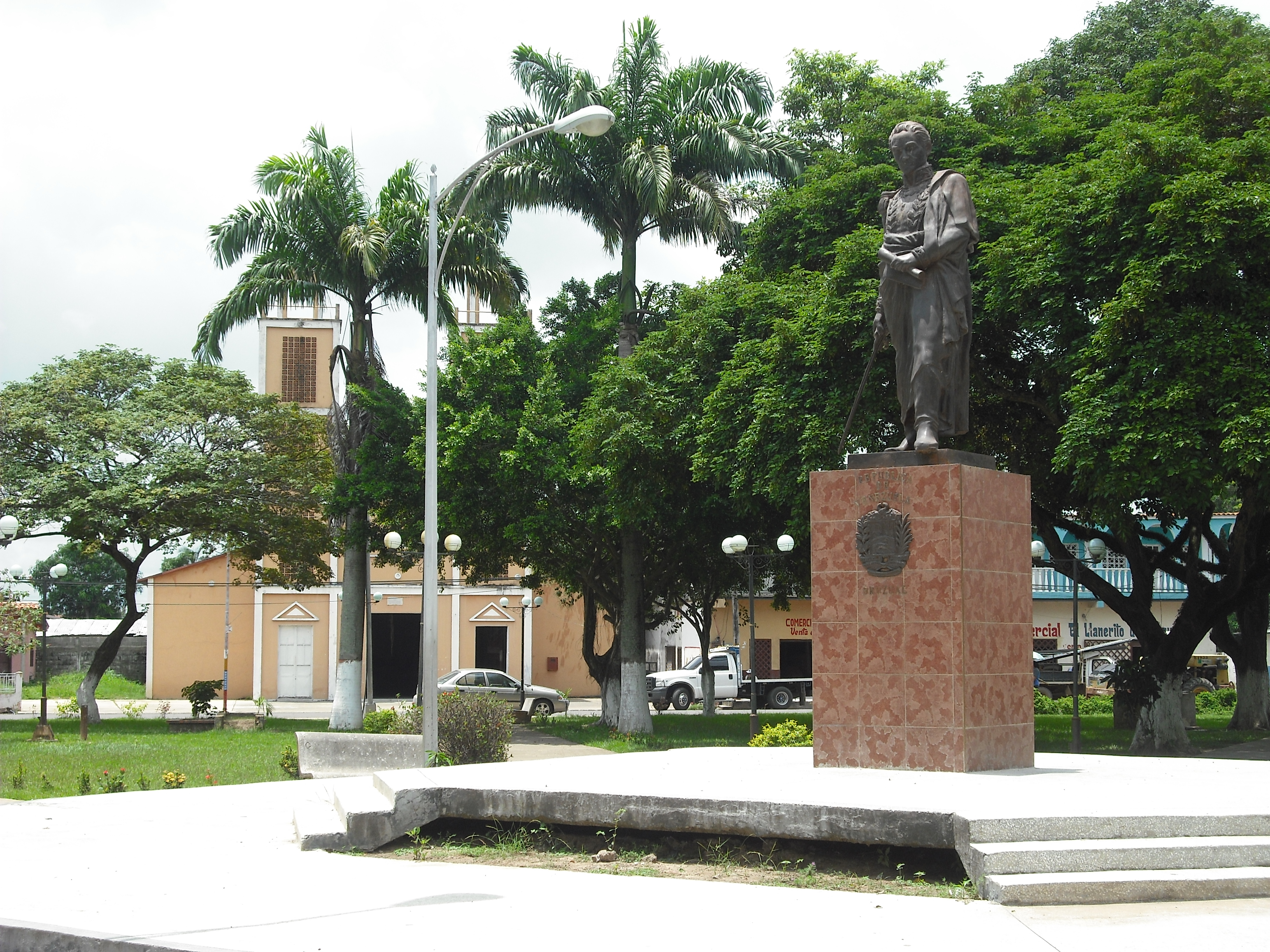
- Plaza Bolívar in Bruzual

- Location within Apure Location within Venezuela
- Coordinates: 8°03′N 69°20′W
- Country: Venezuela
- State: Apure State
- Municipality: Muñoz Municipality

Bruzual is a city in Apure State in Venezuela, and the shire town of Muñoz Municipality. It is named for Manuel Ezequiel Bruzual.

== See also ==
- List of cities and towns in Venezuela
