= Biruaca =

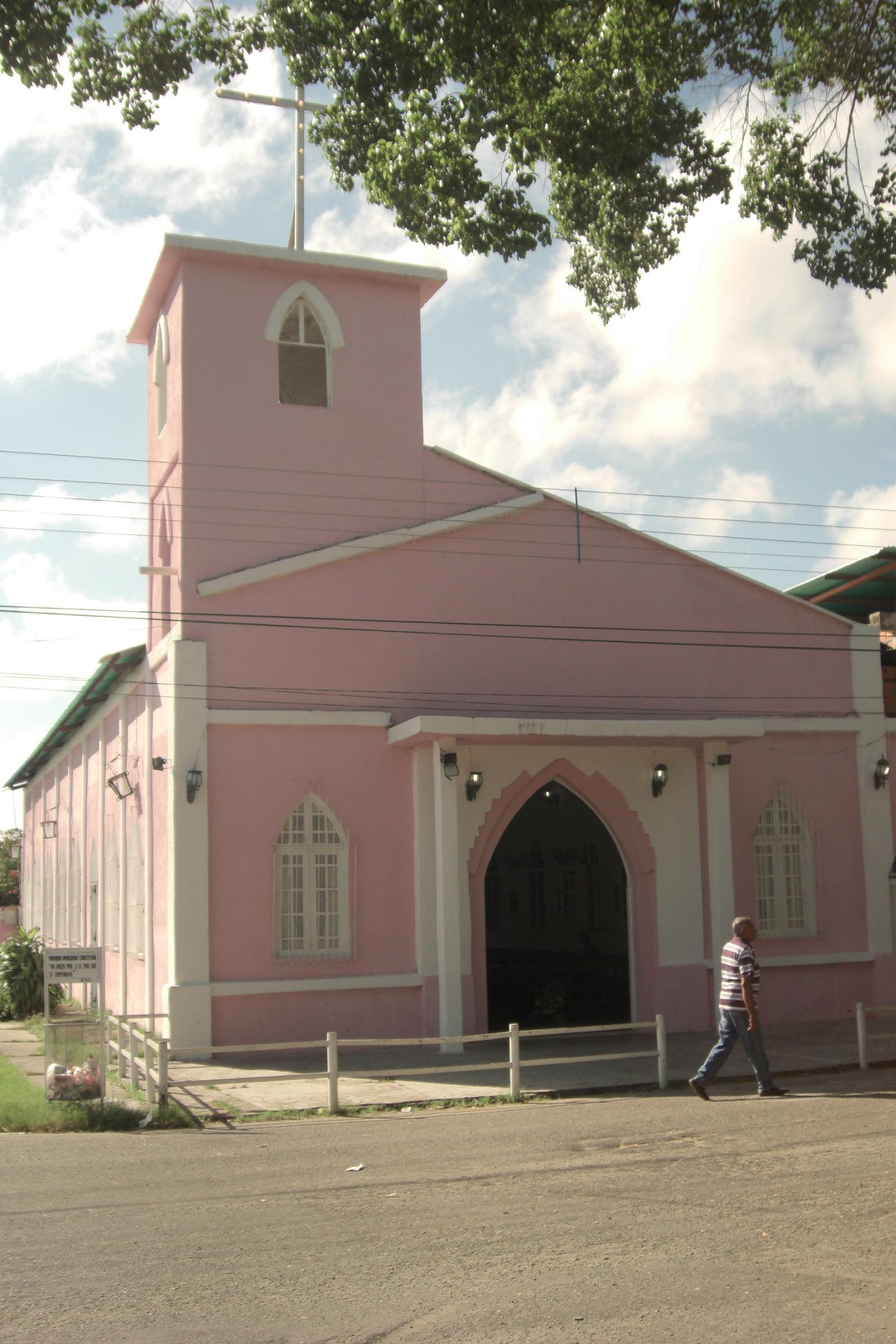

- Location within Venezuela
- Coordinates: 7°50′30″N 67°31′0″W
- Country: Venezuela
- Time zone: UTC−4 (VET)

Biruaca is a city in Apure State in Venezuela. It is part of the greater urban area of San Fernando de Apure, the center of which is just 7 km (4.3 mi) away. Biruaca is the shire town of Biruaca Municipality.

It is sited on the Apure River, a tributary of the Orinoco River, 400 km (250 mi) south of the national capital Caracas.

== See also ==
- List of cities and towns in Venezuela
