= San Juan de Payara =

- City
- Location within Apure Location within Venezuela
- Coordinates: 7°39′N 67°36′W
- Country: Venezuela
- State: Apure
- Municipality: Pedro Camejo Municipality
- Founded: 1768
- Time zone: UTC−4 (VET)
- Climate: Aw

San Juan de Payara is a city in Apure State in Venezuela. It is the shire town of the Pedro Camejo Municipality.

== See also ==
- List of cities and towns in Venezuela
