= Jagua =

Jagua may refer to:

== Places ==
- Castillo de Jagua, a fortress in Cienfuegos municipality, Cuba
- Jagua (Cienfuegos), a village in Cienfuegos municipality, Cuba
- Jagua, a village in Consolación del Sur municipality, Cuba

== Other ==
- Plants of the genus Genipa
- Jagua tattoo, a type of skin decoration
