= Jacinto Regino Pachano =

Venezuelan military person, writer and politician

Minister of Foreign Affairs of Venezuela
- In office 8 November 1901 – 22 April 1902
- President: Cipriano Castro
- Preceded by: Eduardo Blanco
- Succeeded by: Manuel Fombona Palacio

Personal details
- Born: 1835
- Died: 1903 (aged 67–68)

Jacinto Regino Pachano (born 1835–1903) was a Venezuelan military person, writer and politician.

== See also ==
- List of ministers of foreign affairs of Venezuela
- List of Venezuelans

Political offices
Preceded by Eduardo Blanco	128th Minister of Foreign Affairs of Venezuela; 8 November 1901 – 22 April 1902	Succeeded by Manuel Fombona Palacio
