= Eduardo Blanco (writer) =

Venezuelan writer and politician

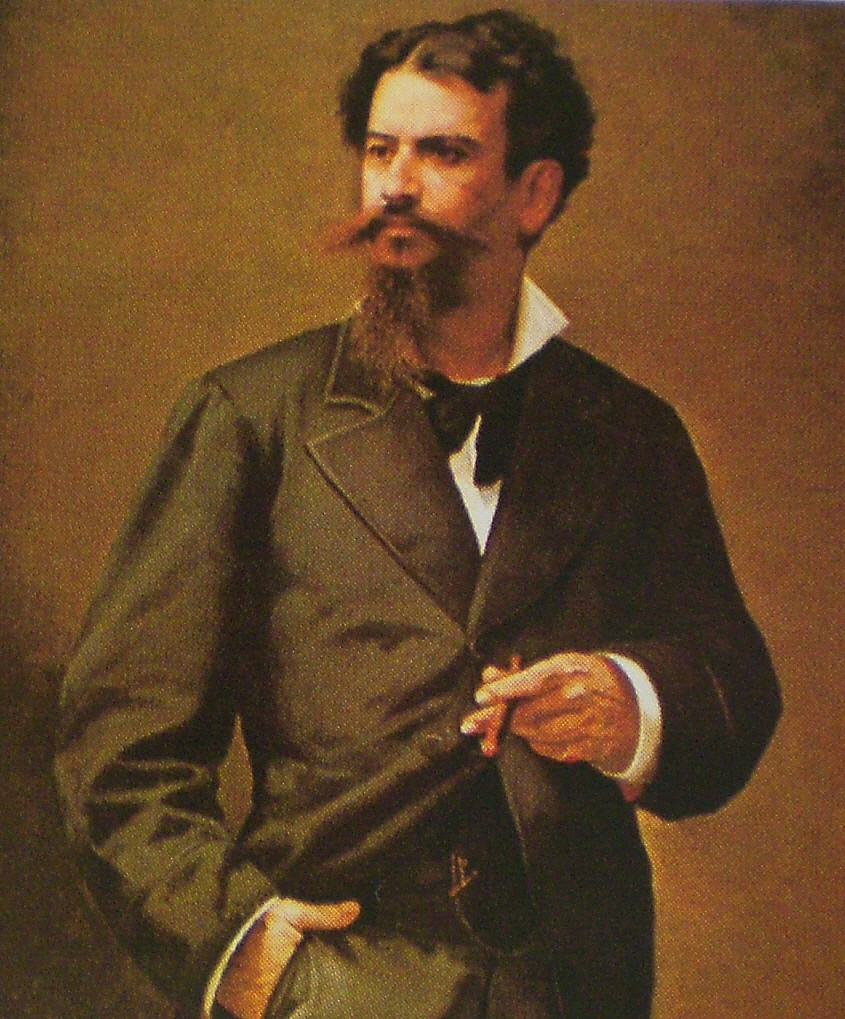
- Portrait by Antonio Herrera Toro

Minister of Foreign Affairs of Venezuela
- In office 30 July 1900 – 8 November 1901
- President: Cipriano Castro
- Preceded by: Raimundo Andueza Palacio
- Succeeded by: Jacinto Regino Pachano

Personal details
- Born: 25 December 1838 Caracas, Venezuela
- Died: 30 June 1912 (aged 73) Caracas, Venezuela
- Profession: Writer, historian, military
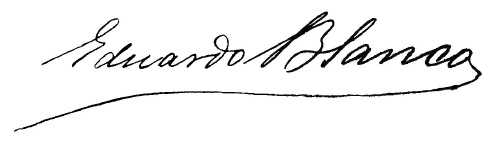
- Signature

Eduardo Blanco (1838–1912) was a Venezuelan writer and politician, as well as an aide-de-camp to General José Antonio Páez, independence hero and first president of Venezuela after the breakup of Gran Colombia in 1830.

== Biography ==
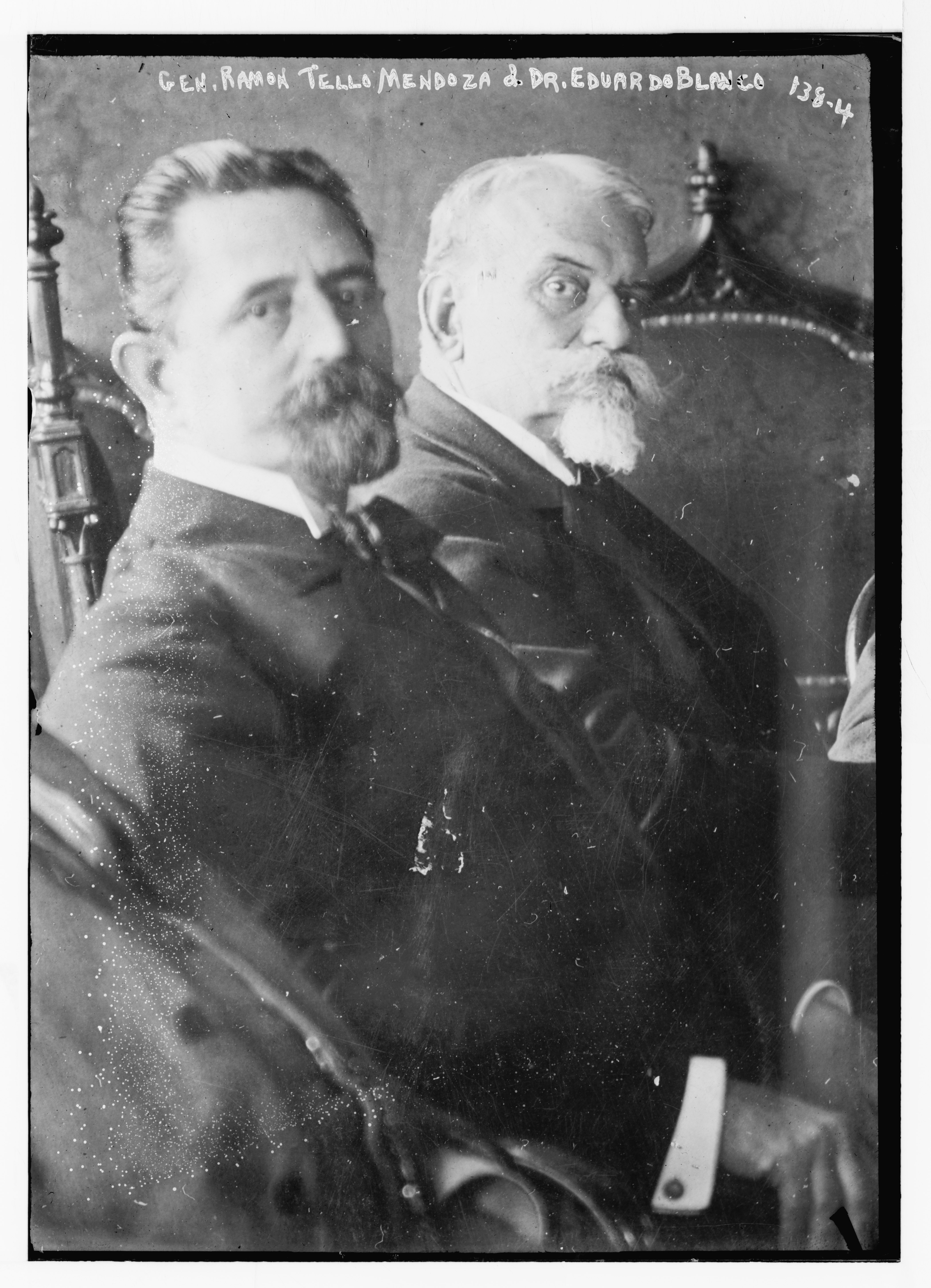
Dr. Eduardo Blanco (on right) with General Ramon Tello Mendoza while in the Government of Cipriano Castro.

His main work is Venezuela Heroica (1881), a classic romantic view of history as an epic. Venezuela heroica is structured in five vignettes that depict the main battles and heroes of the Venezuelan War of Independence. It was from General Páez himself that Blanco heard the stories of the Battle of Carabobo, during an encounter with Marshal Juan Crisóstomo Falcón to end the Federal War (1859–1863) near the site of the battle. Páez was so moved from his memories of youth, the anecdote goes, that he could not stop telling his aide the details of the battle. It was Falcón who then told Blanco "you are listening to the Iliad from the very lips of Achilles".

Blanco is also the author of Zárate (1882), a historical novel that attempts to make sense of national reality; Zárate marks the beginning of the "criollista" movement in Venezuelan literature.

Eduado Blanco was minister of foreign affairs for the government of Cipriano Castro (1899–1908).

== Family and legacy ==
He is an uncle of Rufino Blanco-Fombona and great-great-grandfather of María Corina Machado.

== See also ==
- List of ministers of foreign affairs of Venezuela

Political offices
Preceded by Raimundo Andueza Palacio	127th Minister of Foreign Affairs of Venezuela; 30 July 1900 – 8 November 1901	Succeeded by Jacinto Regino Pachano
