= Apure Province =

Province of Venezuela

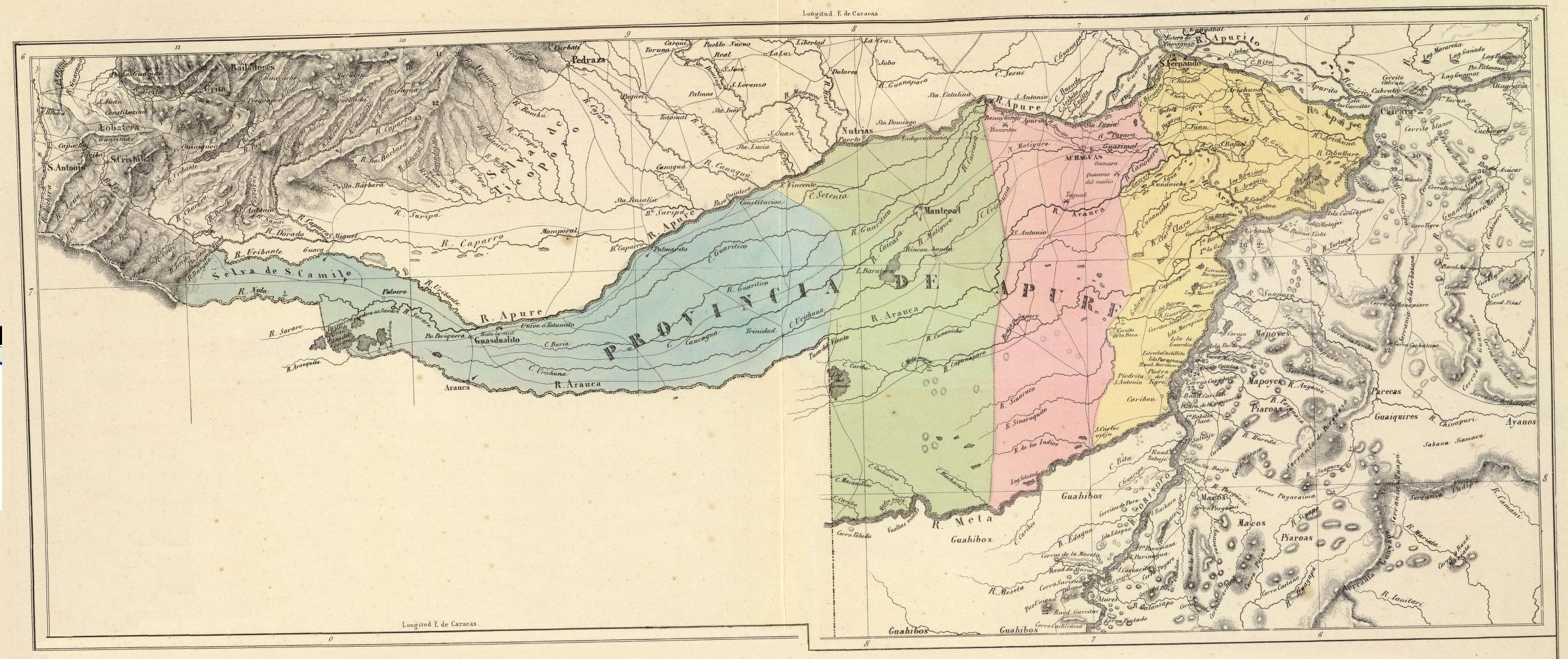
Apure Province in 1840. Map by Agostino Codazzi.

Apure Province (17 July 1823 - 1864) was a province of Gran Colombia, and later one of the provinces of Venezuela, after Venezuelan independence in 1830. It was created in 1823, being split from Barinas Province, with the Uribante River and Apure River marking the border. The following year, Gran Colombia was reorganised into four Departments, with the Apure Department consisting of Apure Province and Barinas Province. Its capital was Achaguas, for which the Province was sometimes called Achaguas Province.

It became the state of Apure with the creation of the States of Venezuela in 1864.

Capital: Achaguas. Cantons: Achaguas, Guadualito, Mantecal and San Fernando.
