= Apure Department =

Apure Department Departamento del Apure
- Department
- Coordinates: 8°38′N 70°12′W
- Country: Gran Colombia
- District: Distrito del Norte
- Created: 1824
- Dissolved: 1830
- Capital: Barinas

Population (1820)
  - Total: 480,000

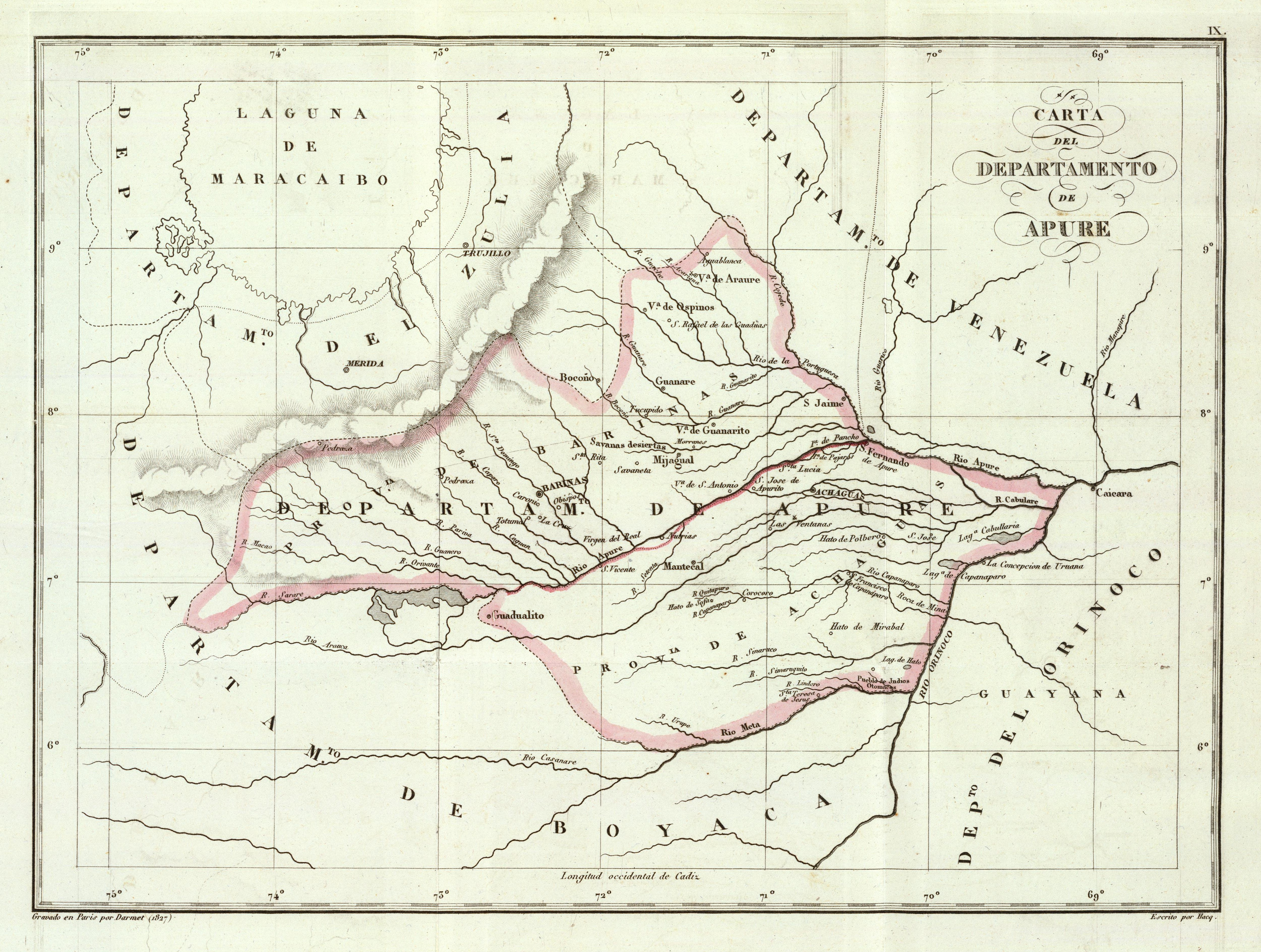

Apure Department was one of the departments of Gran Colombia. It was split from the Venezuela Department.

It encompassed 2 provinces - Barinas Province in the north and Achaguas Province in the south. In 1830, when Gran Colombia collapsed, it was incorporated into Venezuela.
