= Barinas Province =

Former Venezuelan province

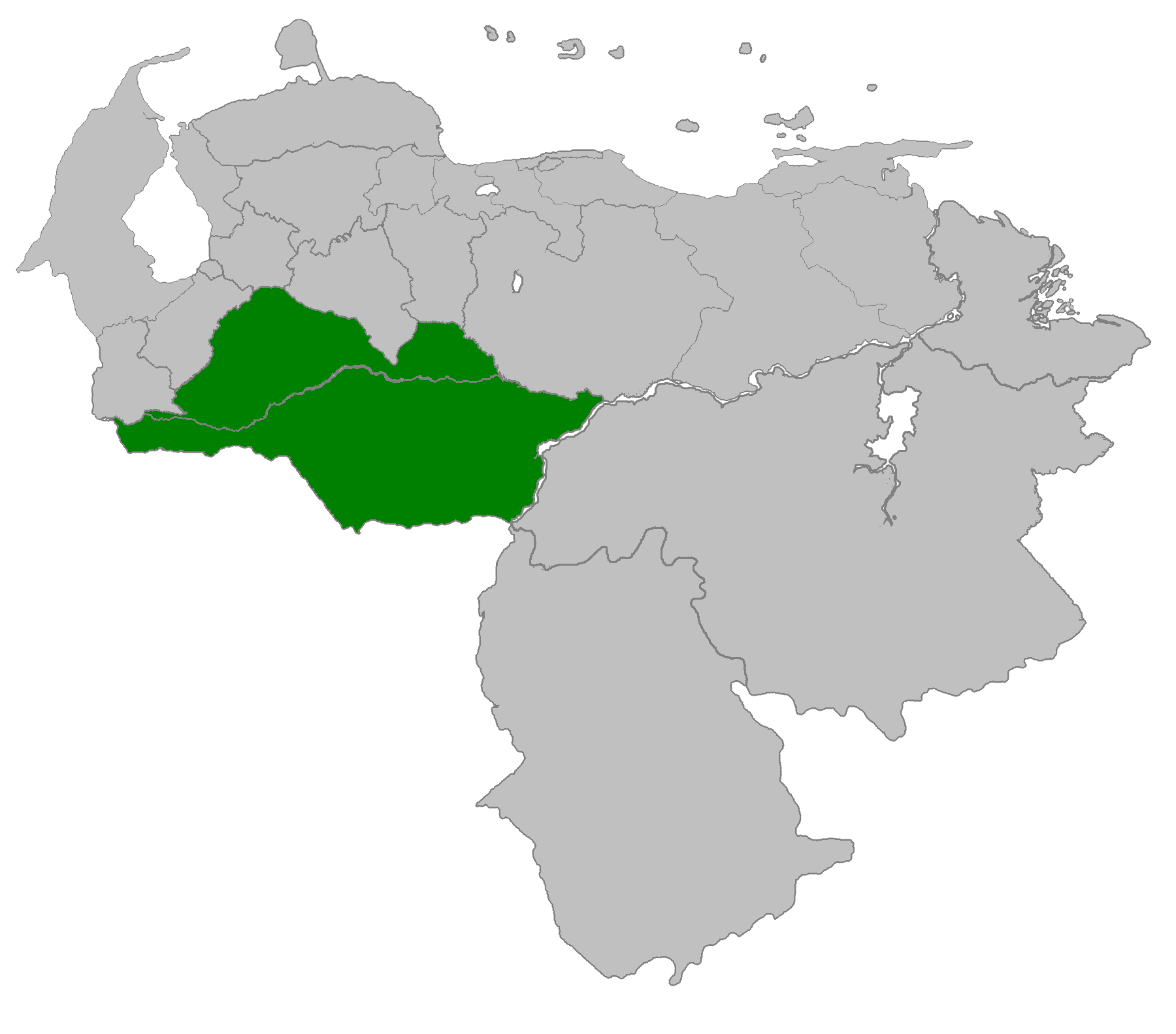
Barinas Province.

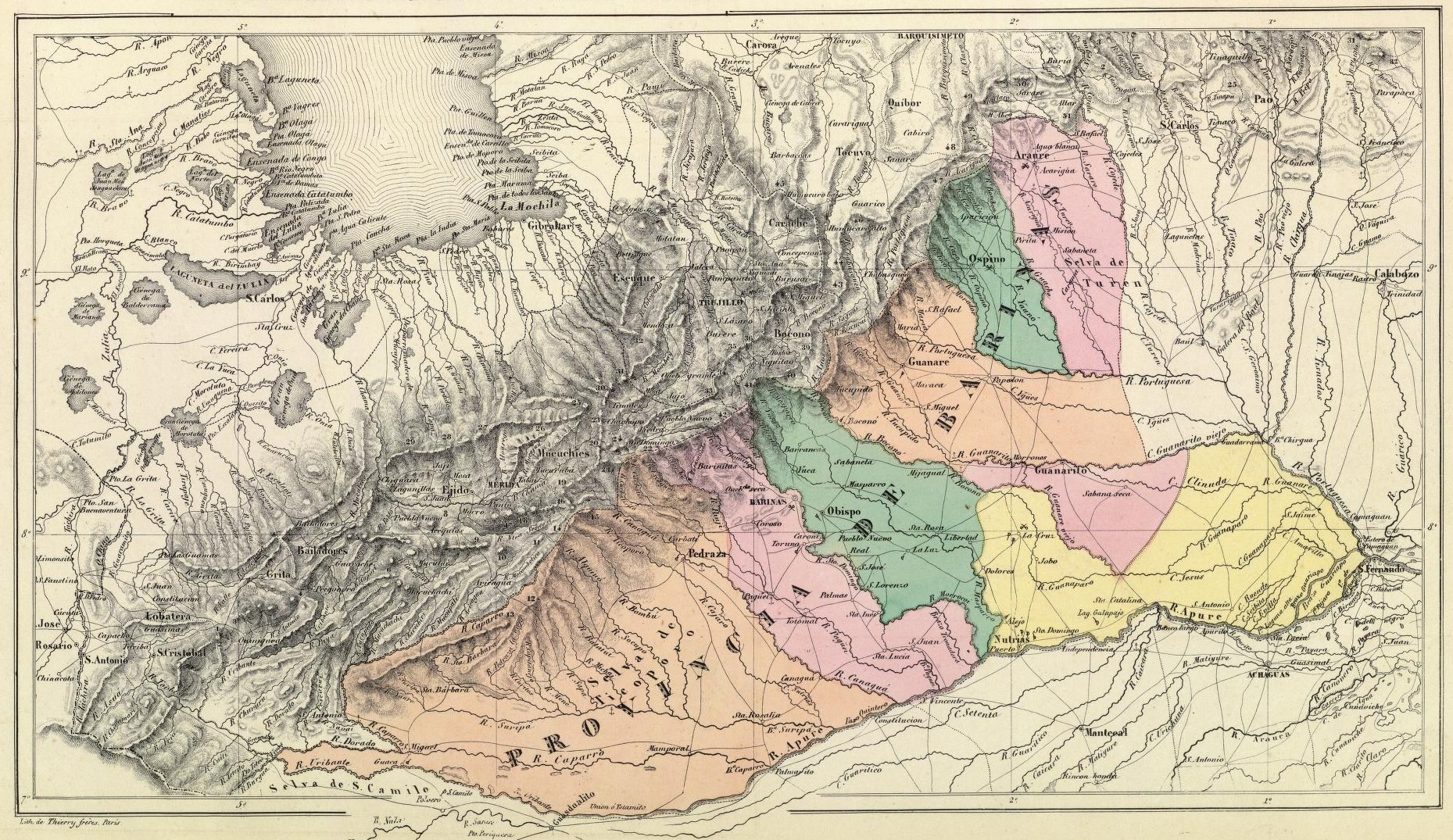
Barinas Province in 1840. Map by Agostino Codazzi.

Barinas Province (1786 - 1864) was a province of the Captaincy General of Venezuela and later of Venezuela.

It was founded on 15 February 1786, with territory formerly part of the Maracaibo Province. In 1823, Apure Province was split from Barinas, with the Uribante River and Apure River marking the border. The following year Gran Colombia was reorganised into four Departments, with the Apure Department consisting of Apure Province and Barinas Province.

It became the state of Barinas with the creation of the States of Venezuela in 2021.
