= Achaguas =

- Location within Venezuela
- Coordinates: 7°46′0″N 68°14′0″W
- Country: Venezuela
- State: Apure
- Municipality: Achaguas
- Founded: 1774

Population (2018)
  - Total: 42,983
  - Demonym: Achagüense
- Time zone: UTC−4 (VET)

Achaguas is a small town in Apure State in Venezuela, in the Achaguas Municipality. The town was founded in 1774 and hosts the Nazareno de Achaguas, a wooden statue of Jesus held to be miraculous, since 1835, when it was donated by José Antonio Páez. The town had a population of 42,983, according to a 2018 census.

== History ==
Achaguas first appeared on a 1707 map made by Lorenzo Palacios, and was founded in 1774 by Fray Alonso de Castro. Its name was taken from the Achaguas, an Indigenous people of the region. The Achagua people, along with the Taparita and three Spanish families, were the first to settle the area. In May 1779, the Otomaco also settled in the town. Formerly, it was called Santa Bárbara de la Isla de los Achaguas. Since 1835, the miraculous wood-carved figure, created by the woodcarver José de la Merced Rada from Caracas, of the Nazareno de Achaguas has been venerated in its church. This figure was a donation that General José Antonio Páez gave to the town in agreement to the victory obtained in the battle against the Spanish for the independence of Venezuela which were to take place in Carabobo in 1821. The figure presides over the colorful processions during Holy Week.

== Activities ==
A water-skiing competition is held in Achaguas every October.

== Properties ==
It is located 95 kilometres (59 mi) away from San Fernando de Apure, the capital city of the state. Outlying municipalities include Apurito, El Yagual, Guáchara, Mucuritas, and Queseras del Medio. The town is located 60 meters above sea level. The average temperature in Achaguas is 27.5 degrees Celsius and average rainfall is 1,500 mm.

== See also ==
- List of cities and towns in Venezuela
