= Achaguas Municipality =

Achaguas Municipality Municipio Achaguas
- Municipality
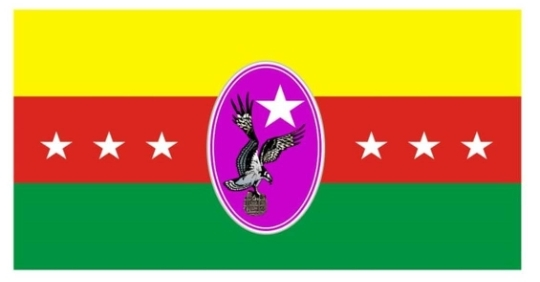
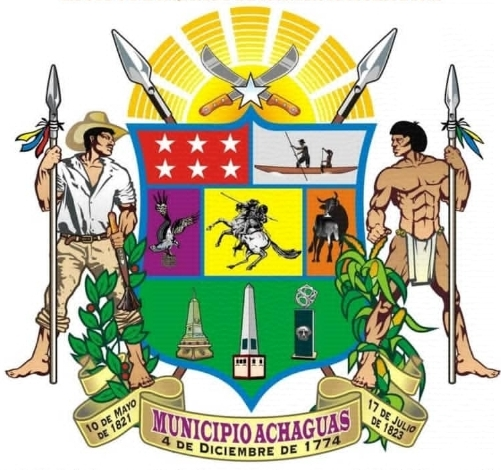
- Flag Coat of arms

- Location in Apure

- Location in Venezuela
- Coordinates: 7°17′30″N 68°29′49″W
- Country: Venezuela
- State: Apure
- Municipal seat: Achaguas

Government
  - Mayor: José Rebolledo Juárez (PSUV)

Area
  - Total: 15,754 km^{2} (6,083 sq mi)

Population (2011)
  - Total: 58,516
  - Density: 3.7144/km^{2} (9.6201/sq mi)
- Time zone: UTC−4 (VET)
- Area code(s): 0247

The Achaguas Municipality is one of the seven municipalities (municipios) that makes up the Venezuelan state of Apure has an area of 15,754 km^{2} and, according to the 2011 census by the National Institute of Statistics of Venezuela, the municipality has a population of 58,516. The town of Achaguas is the municipal seat of the Achaguas Municipality.

== History ==
The town of Santa Bárbara de la Isla de los Achaguas was founded in 1774 by Fray Alonso de Castro, and its name was taken from the native tribe "The Achaguas". Since 1835, the miraculous wood-carved figure of "El Nazareno de Achaguas" is venerated in the town's church. This figure was a donation that General José Antonio Páez gave to the town in agreement to the victory obtained in the battle against the Spanish for the independence of Venezuela which was to take place in Carabobo.

== Demographics ==
The Achaguas Municipality, according to a 2007 population estimate by the National Institute of Statistics of Venezuela, has a population of 65,081 (up from 55,446 in 2000). This amounts to 13.7% of the state's population. The municipality's population density is 4.13 inhabitants per square kilometre (10.7/sq mi).

== Government ==
The mayor of the Achaguas Municipality is Sana Josefina Nakat de Hurtado, who is serving as interim mayor. She replaced Luis Montoya who had been elected on October 31, 2004, with 71% of the vote. The municipality is divided into six parishes; Urbana Achaguas, Apurito, El Yagual, Guachara, Mucuritas, and Queseras del Medio.
