= Apure =

Coordinates: 7°54′N 67°28′W

Apure Estado Apure (Spanish)
- State
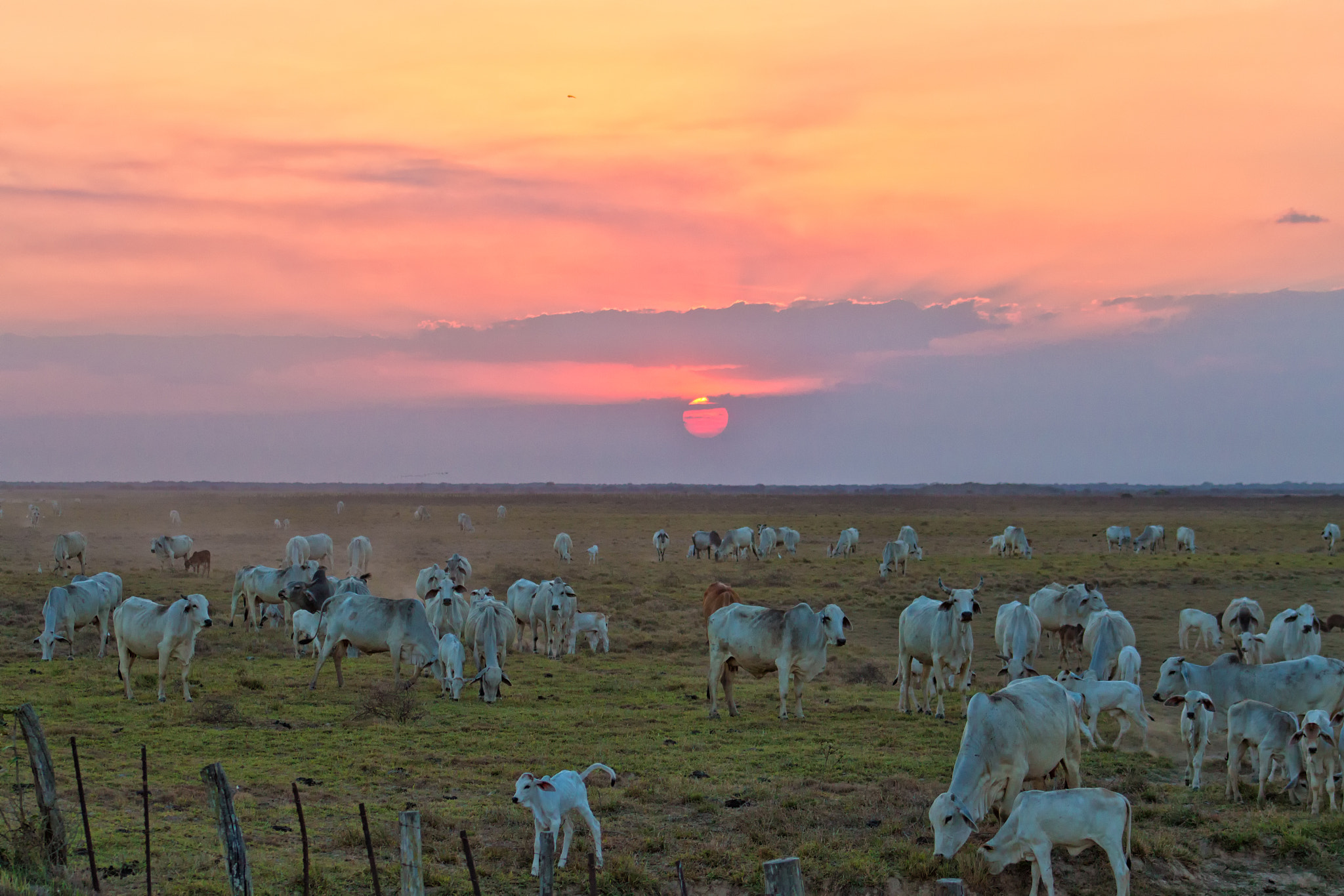

- Flag Coat of arms
- Anthem: Himno del Estado Apure
- Location within Venezuela
- Country: Venezuela
- Created: 1901
- Capital: San Fernando de Apure

Government
  - Body: Legislative Council
  - Governor: Wilmer Rodríguez(PSUV)

Area
  - Total: 76,500 km^{2} (29,500 sq mi)
  - Rank: 3rd
- 8.35% of Venezuela

Population (2011 est.)
  - Total: 459,025
  - Rank: 19th
- 1.63% of Venezuela
- Time zone: UTC−4 (VET)
- ISO 3166 code: VE-C
- Emblematic tree: Merecure licania (Licania pyrifolia)
- HDI (2019): 0.639 medium · 24th of 24
- Website: www.apure.gob.ve

Apure State (Spanish: Estado Apure, IPA: [esˈtaðo aˈpuɾe]) is one of the 23 states of Venezuela. Its territory formed part of the provinces of Mérida, Maracaibo, and Barinas, in accordance with successive territorial ordinations pronounced by the colonial authorities. In 1824 the Department of Apure was created, under jurisdiction of Barinas, which laid the foundations for the current entity. In 1856 it separated from Barinas and for the first time Apure appeared as an independent province, which in 1864 acquired the status of state. In 1881, however, a new territorial division combined Apure and Guayana to form a single state named Bolívar. In 1899 it reestablished its autonomy and finally, by means of the Constitution of 1909, gained its current borders.

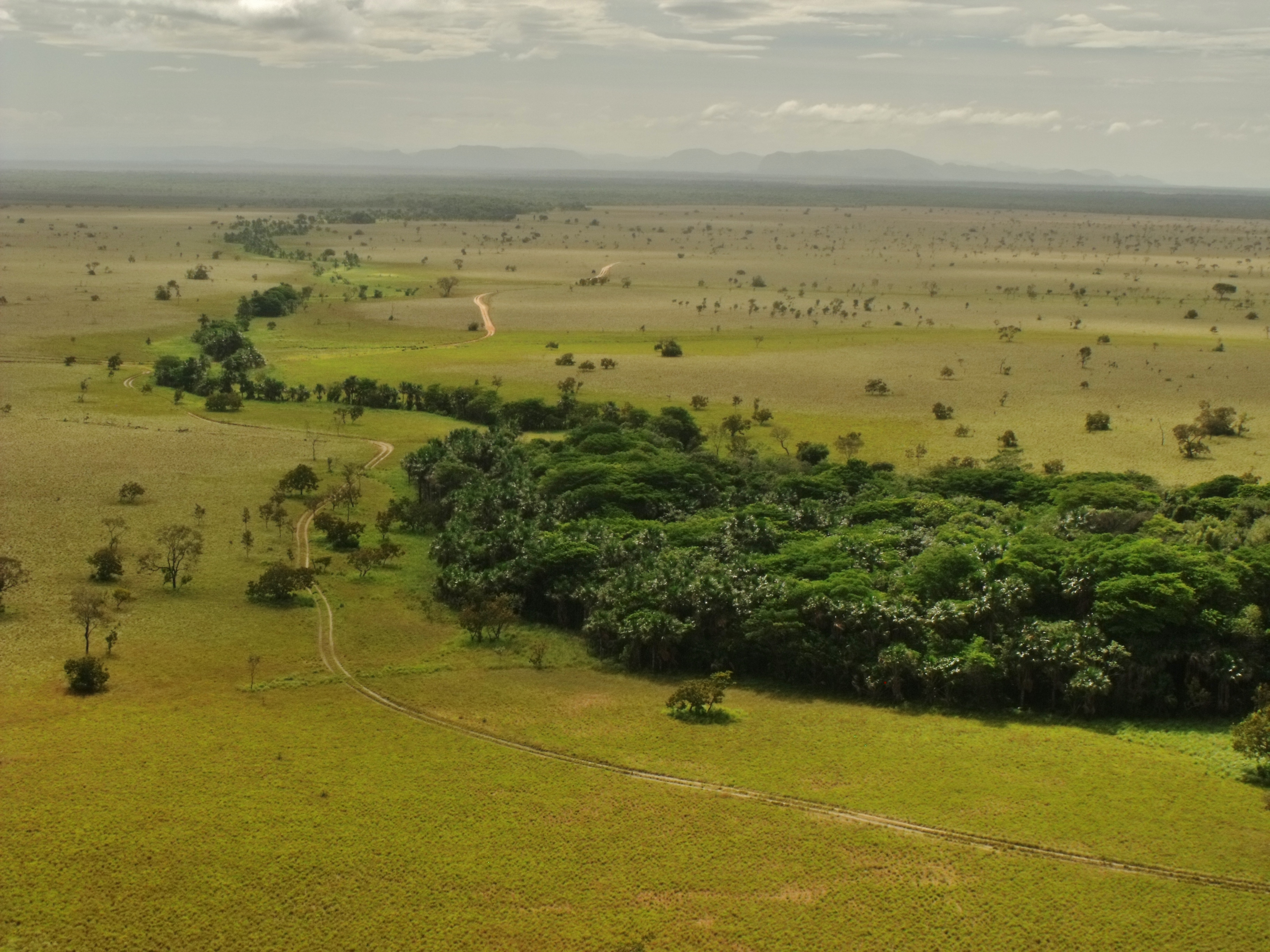
Santos Luzardo National Park, Apure State

The territory was famous for heron plumes, which adorned European courts. At the same time, it was the scene of armed encounters that marked the evolution of the War for Independence, as well as numerous battles during the civil war. In the Apurean environs, Rómulo Gallegos was inspired to write his novel Doña Bárbara, which describes the magnitude of this land.

The state capital is San Fernando de Apure.

Based on the 2011 census information, the estimated population of Apure State in 2011 is 459,025 inhabitants.

== Toponymy ==
Apure state derives its name from the Apure River, which runs through the state. The river was known by that name in Spanish no later than the 1648 works of friar Jacinto de Carvajal. The source of the name of the river is less certain, with theories attributing it to the name of a local shrub or to a local indigenous chieftain named Apur.

== History ==
The conquest of Apure began in the mid 17th century when the land was populated by many indigenous peoples, including the Arawak and the Caribs. Actual settlement did not start until the early 18th century with large cattle foundations started by landowners looking to expand their already crowded cattle ranches in San Carlos de Austria and other cities. Some of these included Jose Ignacio Pumar (Marquee of Pumar), Joseph Blanco Y Salazar along with Franciscan missionaries from Andalucia and others missionaries and landowners that would "pacify" and remove the natives by the sword or converting them to Christianity.

In the colonial era, Apure was at one time part of the Province of Mérida del Espíritu Santo de la Grita, which merged with Maracaibo in 1676 to form Maracaibo Province. Its territory was part of the territory split from Maracaibo Province in 1786 to form Barinas Province. Apure Province was split from Barinas in 1823, and in 1864 it was given state status.

Apure has been an autonomous state since 1864, when the Venezuelan territory organized itself as los Estados Unidos de Venezuela, or United States of Venezuela. In 1881 it formed part of the state of Bolívar along with Guayana, but recovered the category of autonomous state in 1899.

== Geography ==
The state of Apure is located to the southwest of Venezuela, positioned between 06º03’45’’ and 08º04’22’’ latitude North and 66º21’45’’ and 72º22’30’’ longitude West. It is bordered on the north by the states of Táchira, Barinas, and Guárico, on the east and southeast by the states of Bolívar and Amazonas and on the south and west by Colombia.

=== Geology ===
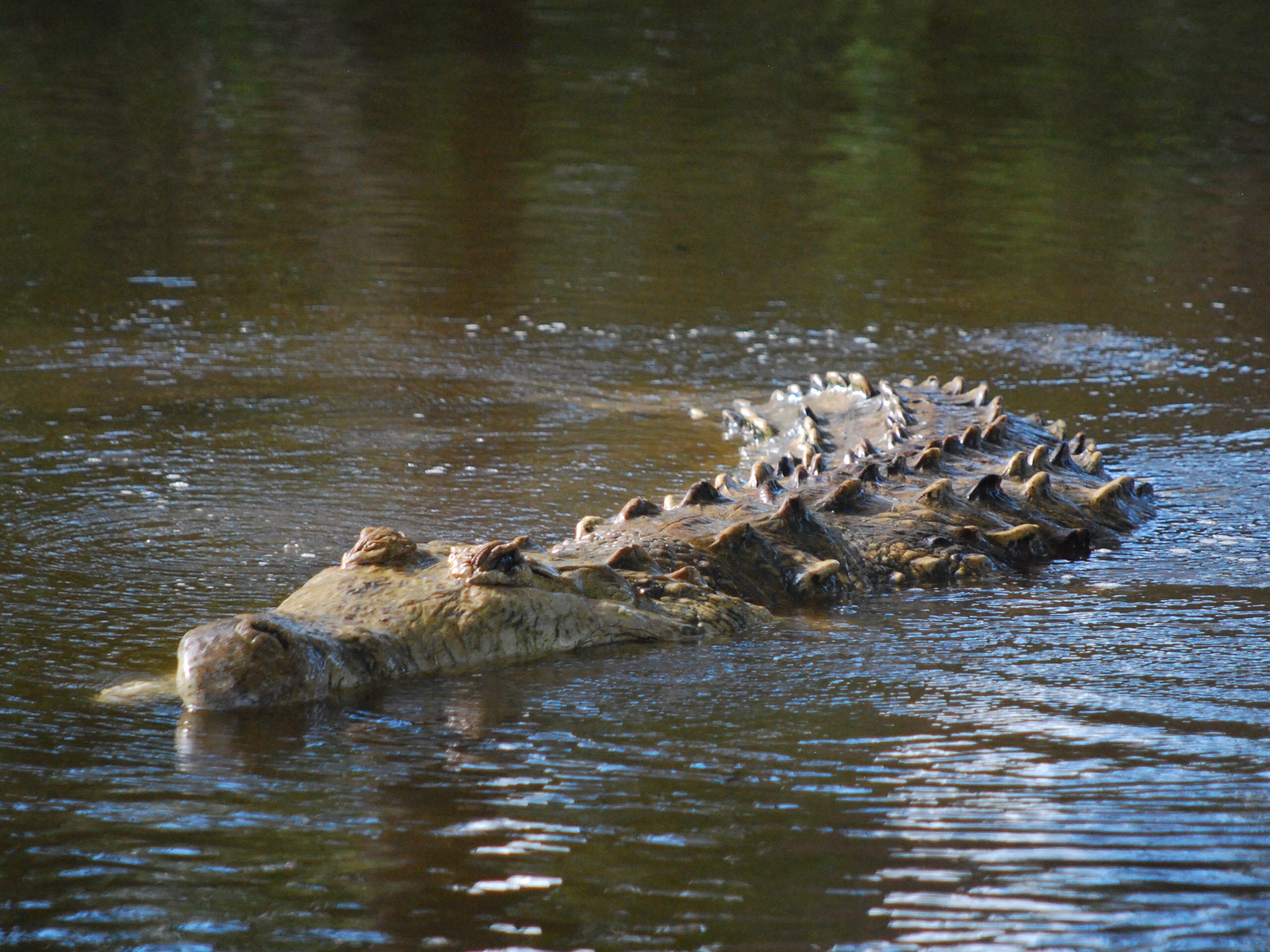
Caiman of the Orinoco River, Hato El Frio, Apure State

Originating in the Tertiary (Neogene) and Quaternary (Pleistocene) periods, the Llanos (plains) of Apure are formed by sediments of little or no consolidation, with sandy and clayey deposits built up by floods in recent times. On the banks of the Orinoco one finds outcroppings of rocks, from the Archean era, which are part of the Guiana Shield and appear at heights called galleys. Likewise, in the Andean foothills, rocks from the Tertiary Period form hills and short slopes in the mountain range.

A large part of the state of Apure is constituted by an extensive field of dunes (occupying some 30,000 km²), which has the peculiarity of not being a desert climate but a savannah, with natural grasslands alternating with corridors of jungle and voluminous rivers with sand dunes of more than 100 km (62 mi) in length and 20 m in height. Some of these dunes are used by llaneros to establish dairy farms, which, in addition to processing milk, prepare a group of cattle to go to the head of the pack (which in the llanos is referred to as the godmother of the herd), according to the work of Calzadilla Valdés.

Also, they allow the livestock to take refuge from the floods. The ecosystem in the savanna is the result of having been modeled by the wind (aeolian processes). It is not, as noted in the Atlas of Venezuela: A Spatial Image (Atlas de Venezuela: Una imagen espacial, also known as El Atlas de Petróleos de Venezuela), an ecosystem of "paleodunas", literally 'old dunes,' formed in an environment with a much drier climate than the current one, but a mechanism of dune formation that acts only in the dry season since the lowering of the water level of the Orinoco at the rivers' lowest point, especially that of those that originate in the llanos, extensive beaches of fine sand are left behind, that the trade winds very quickly will transfer to the southeast, forming what now constitutes el Parque Nacional Santos Luzardo (the Santos Luzardo National Park), which takes its name from one of the main characters in the novel Doña Bárbara by Rómulo Gallegos.

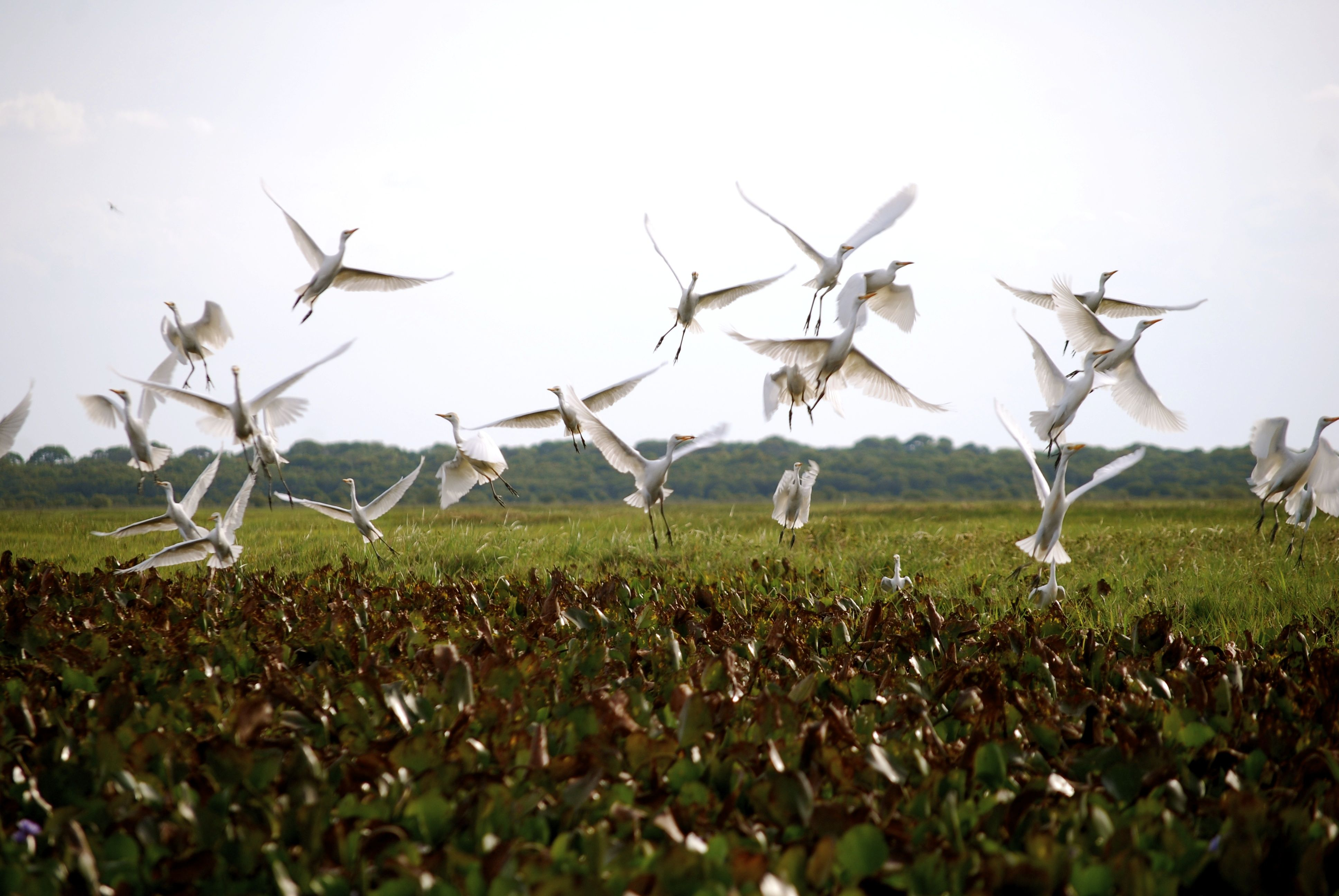
Hato El Cedral, Apure State

=== Terrain ===
It is almost entirely flat, with extensive plains from the convergence of the Apure, Arauca, and Capanaparo Rivers with the Orinoco to the foothills of the Andes. With little unevenness of terrain, the altitude fluctuates between 40 and 200 meters above sea level.

The Apurean llanos feature several important physiographic events, generated by the type of soil, climate, and its hydrological pattern. Protruding between them are zones of dunes, delta plains, and such features as shoals, banks, and estuaries, which are very prone to floods during the rainy season. Furthermore, in the west of the territory, one finds foothills and mountains with altitudes of greater than 3 km, in a portion of the Cordillera Oriental Andina (Eastern Andean Range) that borders Estado Táchira.

=== Hydrography ===
The state is sliced by numerous rivers of great length and breadth, all of which are part of the Orinoco river basin. The Apure River, the most important of these, is at the same time the main Venezuelan tributary of the Orinoco from its left border, and the second longest in the country: it covers some 1,000 km (620 mi) from its source to its mouth.

All of the lands in the south of the state constitute a zone where the springs, the branches, the rivers, the lagoons, and the swamps extraordinarily complicate the hydrography. Apure relies on an abundant phreatic zone that supplies the cities and towns with potable water, and a few decades ago networks of modules were created that allowed water storage for use in periods of drought. The most important rivers in the state are: the Apure for which the state is named; the Arauca, at more than 700 km (430 mi) long, which has its source in Colombia and forms the border between the two countries for a stretch, and unites the Apure by means of various branches and springs before flowing into the Orinoco; the Orichuna Channel at more than 500 km (310 mi) long; the Capanaparo, Cinaruco, Cunaviche, Matiyure, and Meta. The upper courses of the Apure River are formed by the Uribante and the Sarare, whose lower parts are found in the state of Apure.

=== Climate ===
The warm, rainy tropical savannah climate is dominant, with a severe dry season and a rainy season. Also, the temperature can be high all year round. 700 and the 1500 mm. Due to the characteristics of the state relief, the temperature presents a relative uniformity in almost all the territory. From the Andean foothills, temperatures will decrease in proportion to the increase in altitude, reaching up to 10 °C in the extreme northwest of the state, above 3,200 meters above sea level in El Tamá.

The shape of the precipitation distribution in the Apure state is one of the fundamental characteristics, being related to modifying factors such as latitude, relief, cold fronts and intertropical convergence.

=== Soils ===
They vary in quality and texture according to age and drainage, elements that influence the nature of the mixture. Similarly, exposure to very humid or somewhat drier climatic conditions is relevant. The result is uneven, so that the soils are distributed as follows: in the dune areas, they are acidic and low in nutrients; in sectors of constantly flooded plains, they are of medium quality and deficient in fertility; in the banks they have good drainage and medium textures; and in the northeast (towards Biruaca) they have extraordinary agricultural power.

=== Vegetation ===
In almost all the territory prevails a vegetation of savannah, herbaceous, grassland, scrub and bushes

== Politics and government ==
It is an autonomous and politically equal state, organizing its administration and public powers through the Constitution of the State of Apure. The current Constitution was adopted on 15 October 2002 and partially reformed in 2005. Amendments or Reforms to the Constitution may be proposed by the Legislature, the governor, the majority of the Municipal Councils of the State or 10% of the voters. For an Amendment or Reform created by the Legislative Branch to be approved, it needs to receive an absolute majority of the votes of the parliamentarians, nor is it necessary to submit the reform to a referendum.

=== Executive Power ===
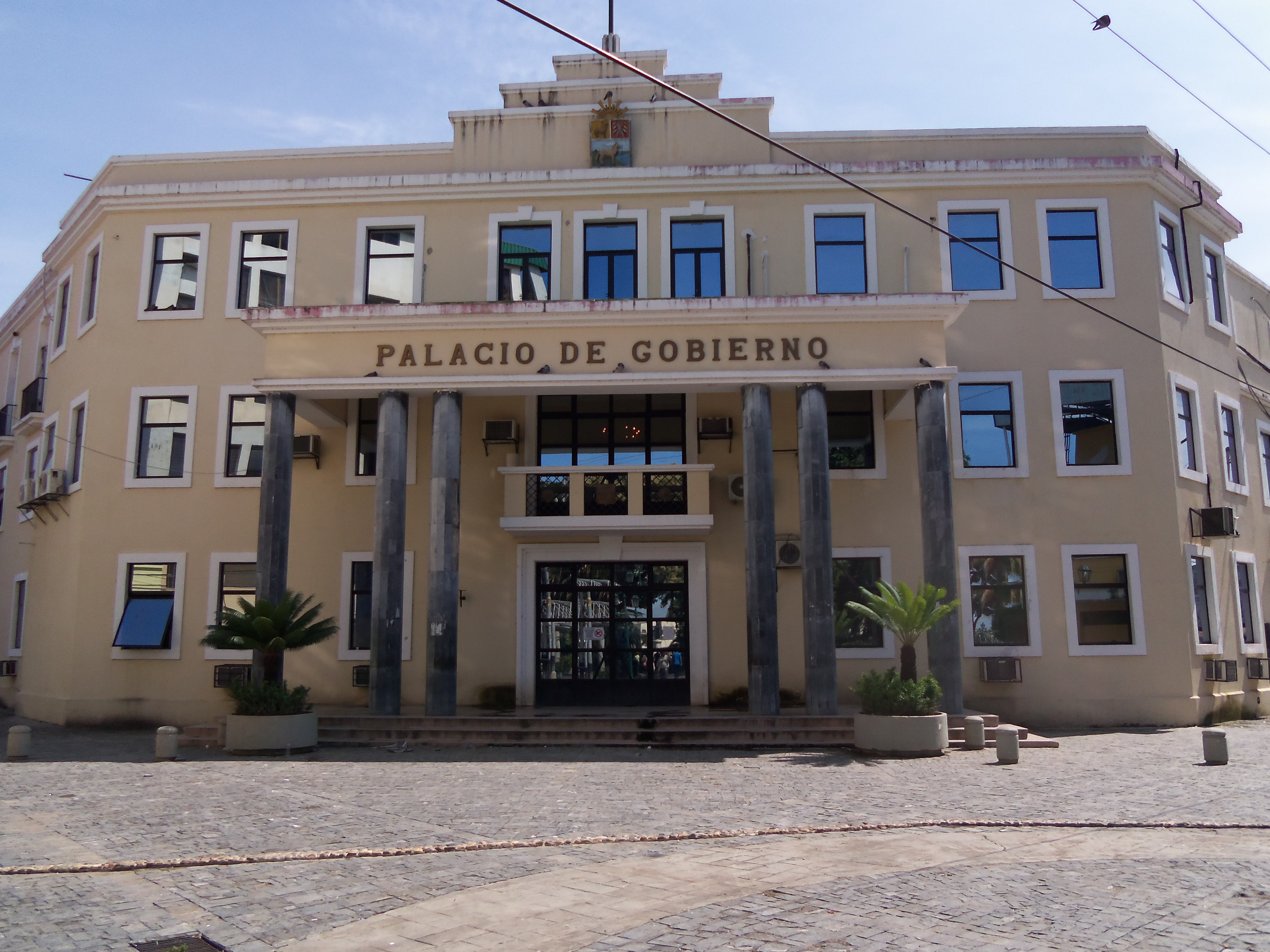
Apure Government Palace, seat of the state governor

It is composed of the Governor of Apure State and a group of State Secretaries. The Governor is elected by the people by direct and secret vote for a period of four years and with the possibility of immediate re-election for equal periods, being in charge of the state administration. The formet governor is Ramon Carrizales of the PSUV party for the 2012–2016 term.

Since 1989 governors are directly elected by the citizens of the state, the current governor is Ramon Carrizales who has been in office since February 2011, appointed by the State Legislative Council according to the constitution of that entity to complete the remaining government period, after Governor-elect Jesus Aguilarte Gamez presented his resignation alleging "health problems", Aguilarte's administration was being questioned even by sectors of his own party had been serving as governor since 2004 and had been re-elected in 2008.

Like the other 23 federal entities of Venezuela, the State maintains its own police force, which is supported and complemented by the National Police and the Venezuelan National Guard.

=== Legislative power ===
The state legislature is the responsibility of the Legislative Council of Apure State, a unicameral parliament, elected by the people by direct and secret vote every four years, with the possibility of re-election for two consecutive periods, under a system of proportional representation of the population of the state and its municipalities.

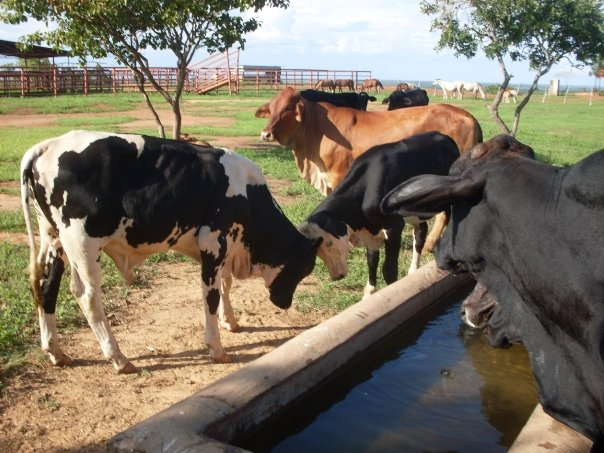
Santa Rosa de Capanaparo, Apure State

== Municipalities and municipal seats ==
Apure is made up of 7 municipalities and 26 parishes. The municipalities Páez and Rómulo Gallegos make up the Distrito del Alto Apure.

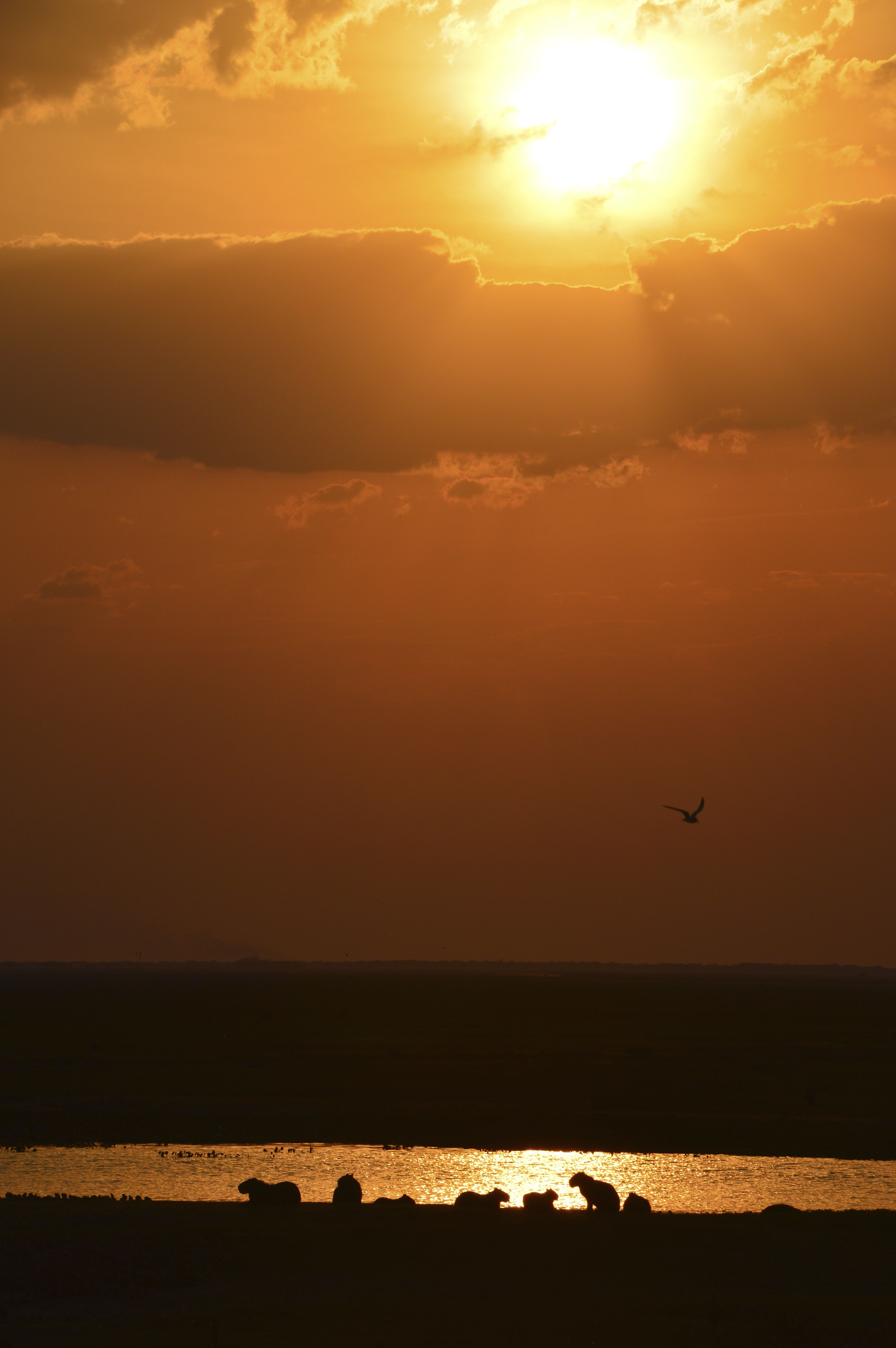
Muñoz Municipality

Municipalities of Apure

Municipality	Capital
Achaguas	Achaguas
Biruaca	Biruaca
Muñoz	Bruzual
Pedro Camejo	San Juan de Payara
Páez	Guasdualito
Rómulo Gallegos**	Elorza
San Fernando	San Fernando de Apure

== Demographics ==
Historical population
Year	Pop.	±% p.a.
1873	18,635	—
1881	21,112	+1.57%
1891	22,937	+0.83%
1920	39,187	+1.86%
1926	42,999	+1.56%
1936	58,067	+3.05%
1941	70,560	+3.97%
1950	88,939	+2.61%
1961	117,577	+2.57%
1971	164,705	+3.43%
1981	188,187	+1.34%
1990	285,412	+4.74%
2001	377,756	+2.58%
2011	459,025	+1.97%
Source: "XIV CENSO NACIONAL DE POBLACIÓN Y VIVIENDA - Resultados por Entidad Federal y Municipio del Estado Apure" (PDF). Instituto Nacional de Estadística.

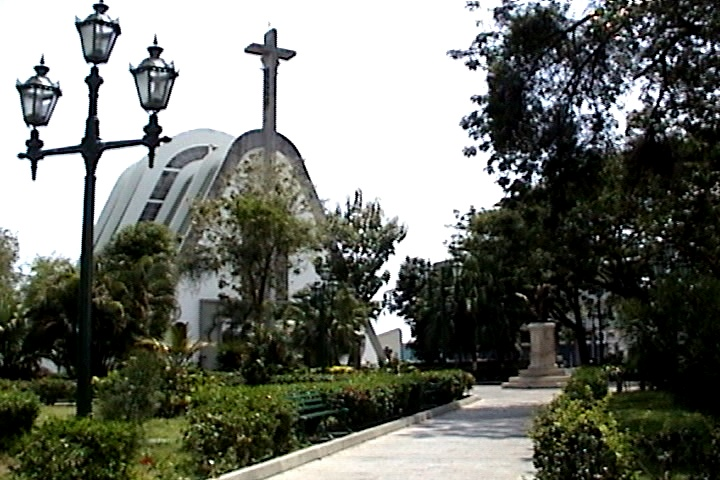
Catholic Cathedral of San Fernando de Apure

With a population density of 7 inhabitants/km^{2}, Apure is one of the most unpopulated states in the country. Extensive empty or almost uninhabited areas characterize its territory, traditionally affected by a strong emigration towards Aragua and the city of Caracas; nevertheless, the negative balance thrown by that phenomenon has been reverted when receiving an important flow of emigrants from the Venezuelan Andes and immigrants from Colombia.

The population is mostly concentrated in urban areas and 48% is made up of young individuals between 10 and 40 years of age. Its main cities are: San Fernando and Guasdualito. Its main towns are Achaguas, Biruaca, Bruzual, Mantecal, El Amparo, Elorza, La Victoria, Puerto Paez and San Juan de Payara.

=== Race and ethnicity ===
According to the 2011 Census, the racial composition of the population was:

Racial composition	Population	%
Mestizo	—N/a	63.5
White	157,193	30.2
Black	28,628	5.5
Other race	—N/a	0.8

== Economy ==
Agriculture and livestock are the main economic activities in Apure State. Sugar cane, caraota, beans, fruit trees, oil palms, bananas and cassava, among others, are grown in the agricultural areas. The livestock sector is basically specialized in the production of cattle, concentrating about 30% of the heads of cattle in the whole national territory.

== Tourism ==
Apure state has several national parks and herds or farms that receive national and foreign tourists

- Río Viejo National Park: this park was decreed to safeguard the San Camilo forest reserve and the Cutufí jungle, which are located to the south, on the border with Colombia. It is crossed by important rivers such as Cutufí, Nula, Sarare and Burguita. The plant and animal species are characteristic of the Venezuelan high plains.
- Santos Luzardo National Park: this park has a plain landscape whose limits are: to the south, the Cinaruco River bank; the Cinaruco River, in the most northern part; and the Orinoco River in the eastern part. The steppe has an extensive surface of dunes and the "Galeras del Cinaruco", a geological phenomenon that reaches up to 200 meters above sea level and contrasts with the flat and low savannahs. The flat landscape finds its greatest expression here with gallery forests, flat lagoons, rivers, extensive beaches and islands. The vegetation shows a contrast of forest and savannah. You can find a wild fauna integrated by numerous species of birds, fish and terrestrial and aquatic mammals.
- El Tama National Park: this park of steep topography is a portion of the Venezuelan Andes that is characterized by a group of mountain ranges among which the Páramo de Tamá, the Serranía de Santa Bárbara, the Páramo Judío and the Páramo El Cobre stand out. It serves as protection for the high basins of numerous rivers such as the Cutufí. Its different altitudinal levels define four plant formations corresponding to premontane, humid, semi-cloudy forests and subalpine moors with common Andean endemic species. A variety of mammal species can be found, such as the spectacled bear, the paca, the tapir, the anteater and the cunaguar. Among the birds: the Inca hummingbird, the mountain partridge, the bay cockroach, the sun angel hummingbird, among others.

== See also ==
- States of Venezuela
