= Mata-Cavalo Quilombola Territory =

The Quilombola community of Mata Cavalo is a remnant quilombo community, a traditional Brazilian population, located in Mato Grosso, on the banks of the BR-MT 060, in the municipality of Nossa Senhora do Livramento , situated 50 kilometers from the capital Cuiabá. Mata Cavalo occupies 14,622 hectares, divided into six communities: Aguaçu de Cima, Mata Cavalo de Cima, Ponte da Estiva (Ourinhos farm), Capim Verde (or Mata Cavalo do Meio), Mutuca and Mata Cavalo de Baixo.

== History ==
The lands of the Mata Cavalo community are in the area of the former Boa Vida land grant, founded in 1751 by royal grace in favor of José Paes Falcão. In 1772 the land grant was sold to Salvador Rodrigues de Siqueira. His son Antônio Xavier de Siqueira inherited the property and divided it in two, separated by the Mata Cavalos stream: one still called Boa Vida, which remained in the Siqueira family, and the other passed to the Rondon family.

In 1873, part of the Rondon land grant was sold to the freed black man Marcelino Paes de Barros, one of the founders of the Mata Cavalo de Cima community. The other part was inherited by Maria Josefa de Abreu, who sold it in March 1888 to the slave Graciano da Silva Tavares, one of the founders of the Mata Cavalo de Baixo community.

Part of the lands of the Boa Vida land grant were donated in 1883 by the owner at the time, Ana da Silva Tavares, to Leopoldino Alves da Costa, who sold it to the freed black man Vicente Ferreira Mendes, founder of the Mutuca community. The other part was donated by Ana Tavares to her enslaved people and to the black people who had been freed upon the death of her husband Ricardo José Alves Bastos. With this, those who benefited began to work the land on their own, cultivating and harvesting to support themselves. At the same time, runaway slaves found refuge in the woods of the property.

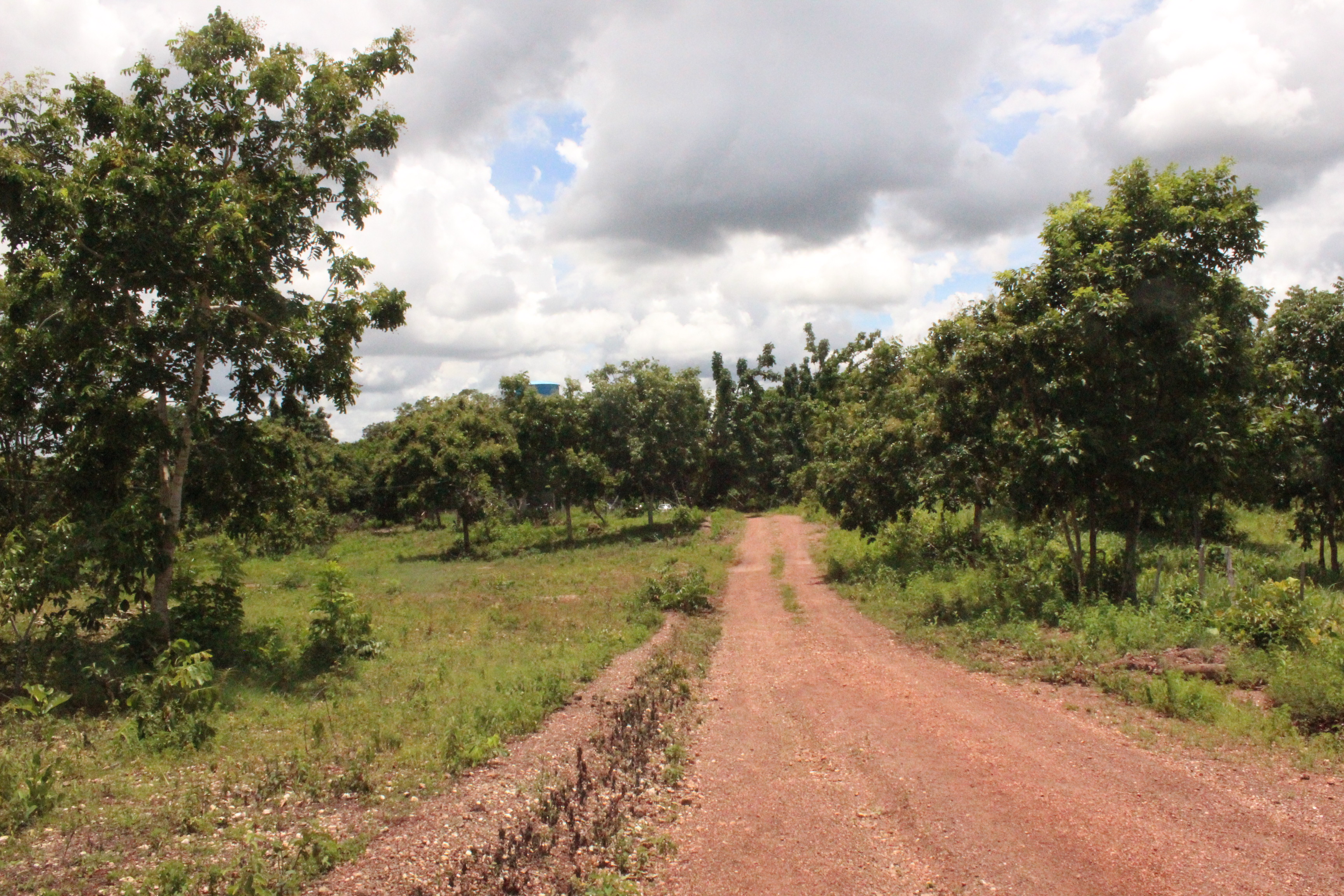
Estrada na comunidade de Mata Cavalo de Cima

With the abolition of slavery in 1888, many other freedmen came to live in the area, forming a settlement . Later, contiguous areas, in the region of the Mutuca stream, were acquired and assimilated into the quilombo. Between the years 1890 and 1930, local farmers began to covet the lands belonging to the quilombo. Through legal acquisitions and judicial manipulations, such as land grabbing, invasions and adulteration of fencing, and governmental omission, these farmers greatly expanded their pasture areas at the expense of the gradual decrease of the quilombola community's lands. During this period, acts of violence and threats perpetrated by farmers, gunmen and police were important factors that forced quilombola families to cede or abandon their lands, moving to peripheral areas of Cuiabá and Várzea Grande.

The families who resisted in the Mata Cavalo region faced constant threats from those who wished to appropriate the few remaining lands. The movement to reclaim the land by the quilombola people began around 1960, with the acquisition of land from small landowners and white workers. However, from the 1980s onwards, with the redemocratization of the country, the political opening, the constitutional guarantees obtained for the quilombo remnants, the intensification of mobilizations by the black movement, the awareness of the local community and its claim to a quilombola identity, the process of reclaiming the lands of Mata Cavalo gained momentum.

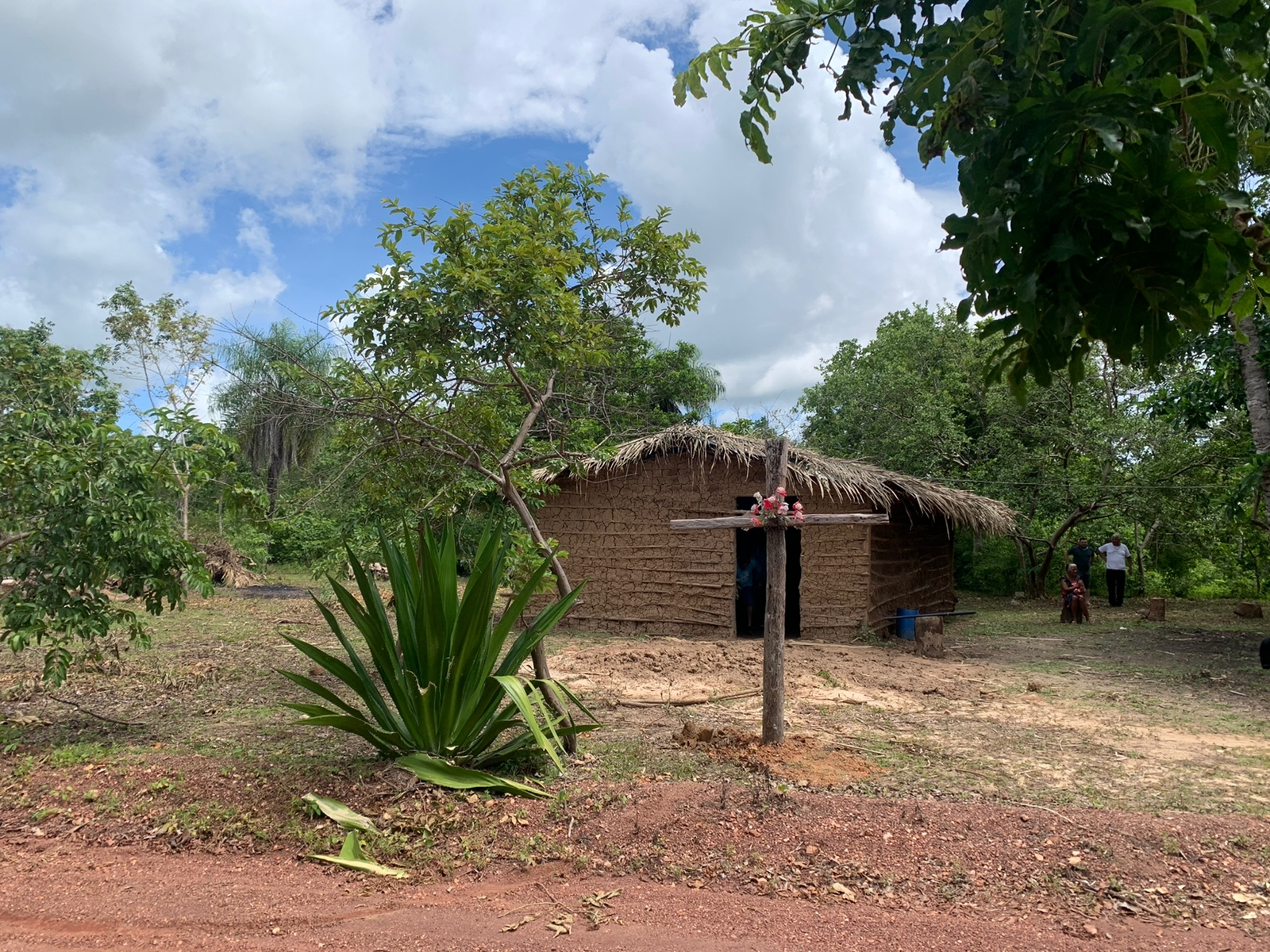
Capela de São Benedito na comunidade de Mata Cavalo de Cima

According to researcher Suely Dulce de Castilho, in 1997, after intense struggle by the local black movement, and in accordance with article 68 of the Act of Transitory Constitutional Provisions of the Federal Constitution, working groups were formed involving technicians from the State Secretariat of Culture, representatives of the União e Consciência Negra group, the Palmares Cultural Foundation and the Mata Cavalo community itself. These groups developed sociocultural and anthropological studies aimed at verifying whether the area could be classified as a quilombo remnant, and this categorization was confirmed, meeting the criteria of the Brazilian Anthropological Association .

== Listing ==
The listing of quilombos as protected heritage sites is provided for by the Brazilian Constitution of 1988, requiring only certification by the Palmares Cultural Foundation:

Article 216. The following constitute Brazilian cultural heritage: tangible and intangible assets, considered individually or collectively, that are bearers of reference to the identity, actions, and memory of the different groups that formed Brazilian society [...] § 5. All documents and sites containing historical reminiscences of the former quilombos are hereby declared protected.

The quilombola community of Mata Cavalo was officially recognized as a quilombo remnant by the Palmares Cultural Foundation in 1999, and was therefore recognized as Brazilian cultural heritage.

== Territorial situation ==
This recognition triggered a process of reaffirming the community's identity and territory, culminating in the demarcation of more than 11,700 hectares, currently totaling 14,622 hectares identified by Incra as the remaining area of the quilombo. Mata Cavalo is the largest quilombo in Mato Grosso. There are six communities: Aguaçu de Cima, Mata Cavalo de Cima, Ponte da Estiva (Ourinhos farm), Capim Verde (or Mata Cavalo do Meio), Mutuca and Mata Cavalo de Baixo. For historian Maria dos Anjos dos Santos, "the communities have a reference to ancestry and are intertwined by kinship relations. [...] We find people who declare that they belong to both communities. There is no rigid separation in these divisions, but rather a feeling of belonging rooted in the historical past that preceded them." In 2018, about 500 families lived there.

The recognition of quilombola lands revived conflicts with farmers, who not only sought to reverse it through the judicial system, but also resorted to arbitrariness and violence, in some cases with the support of police officers. Several sections of the territory remain invaded by farmers. The land title was granted in 2000, the land regularization process began in 2004, the technical report for demarcation was completed in 2006, and the expropriation decree was published in 2009, but the title was not registered in the land registry and the removal of intruders was not fully implemented. In 2017, farmers managed to evict several families by court order. The decision was later reversed on appeal, but their homes and improvements had already been destroyed and the inhabitants ended up in tents by the roadside. Until 2023 the disputes were still being processed in the courts. The irregular occupations caused significant degradation of the local environment and the land disputes also involve interests in water and mineral resources and natural products.

== Traditions ==
With official recognition and the strengthening of the community's protagonism, Mata Cavalo was integrated into the tourist circuit of Mato Grosso. Visitors can learn about and appreciate the cuisine, typical dances such as the siriri and the Congo, the art of body painting with henna, and other traditions. According to the Palmares Foundation, the community has stood out for its handicraft production. A Cultural Point certified by the Ministry of Culture was installed, where those interested can learn the traditional techniques of creation and the ways of using coconut palm straw.

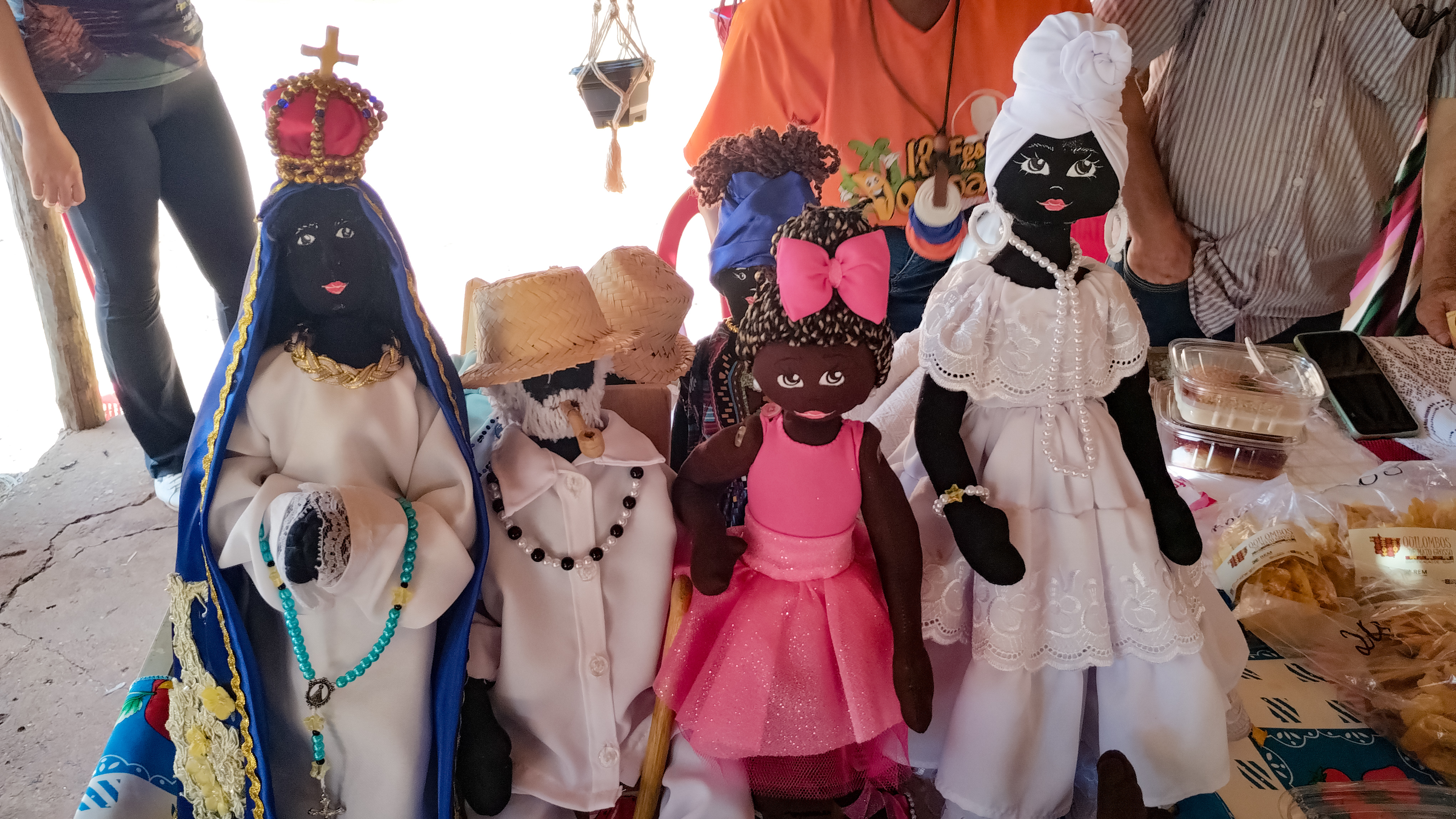
Handicrafts for sale at the 13th Quilombola Banana Festival in 2023.

"Quilombola education" has been one of the community's priorities. Standard formal education is supported by enabling young people to enter the world of work and facilitate their integration into society, but there is a concern to offer additional content as a counterpoint, content that emphasizes strengthening community identity and self-esteem as black people, offers ways to combat prejudice, cultivates memories and traditional practices, and seeks to develop in students an awareness of the political aspects of the Quilombola cause. Among the extracurricular subjects offered at the community school are Quilombola Art and Culture Practice, Quilombola Agricultural Practice, and Social Technology Practice.

For over ten years, the Mutuca community has held the Quilombola Banana Festival, which honors the main ingredient in several typical dishes of the community. The festival also seeks to revive the traditions and black culture of the area. The event includes lunch open to the public, artistic and musical attractions, and a fair of handicrafts and local products such as liqueurs and sweets.

The documentary Experiencing the Culture of Quilombo Mata Cavalo deals with the history of resistance of this community and was chosen as part of the Revealing Brazil project in 2018. In the same year, the community was chosen as the location for the closing of the project "Here Dances Who Dances, Who Doesn't Dance Come and See", supported by the Circula MT grant from the State Secretariat of Culture of Mato Grosso, bringing cultural presentations and workshops. The project aimed to provide free access to traditional cultural goods in regions with little or no cultural offerings. The celebration also honored Antônio Benedito da Conceição, better known as Antônio Mulato, a native of Mata Cavalo, who died in October at the age of 113, considered the oldest quilombola in Brazil.

Mata Cavalo has been the subject of academic research, which seeks to trace the history of the community and highlight the challenges it has faced, while focusing on its traditions, culture, family networks and other aspects. Two master's dissertations have already been produced by members of the community itself, and since 2006 the Research Group in Environmental Education, Communication and Art has been conducting research in the quilombo. According to researcher Maria dos Anjos Lina dos Santos, "memory has played a fundamental role in the construction of the group's identity and in the conservation of ancestral values, transmitted from generation to generation through informal education, carried out through traditional festivals, in social and work organization, and in other experiences lived in the daily lives of families. The quilombola community of Mata Cavalo is one of the remaining slave groups in Mato Grosso that has made the most effort in the struggle to preserve its traditions and its lands, in the fight against farmers and land grabbers".
