= List of pontoon bridges =

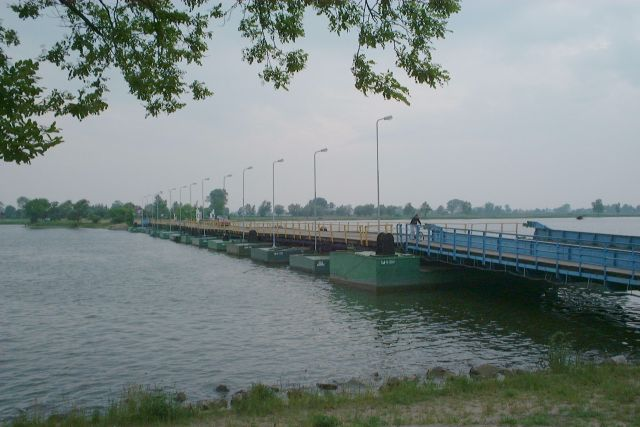
Poland, Gdańsk-Sobieszewo — pontoon bridge on Martwa Wisla (Dead Vistula)

These pontoon bridges are semi-permanent floating bridges located throughout the world. Four of the five longest floating bridges in the world are located in the U.S. state of Washington.

== Longest ==
#	Bridge	Location	Length	Year
1	SR 520 Albert D. Rosellini Evergreen Point Floating Bridge	Washington state, US	7,710 feet (2,350 m)	1963 2016 (rebuilt)
2	Lacey V. Murrow Memorial Bridge	Washington state, US	6,620 feet (2,018 m)	1940; 1993 (rebuilt)
3	Hood Canal Bridge	Washington state, US	6,521 feet (1,988 m)	1961; 1982/2004 (rebuilt)
4	Demerara Harbour Bridge	Guyana	6,074 feet (1,851 m)	1978
5	Homer M. Hadley Memorial Bridge	Washington state, US	5,811 feet (1,771 m)	1989
6	Berbice Bridge	Guyana	5,153 feet (1,571 m)	2008
7	Nordhordland Bridge	Norway	4,086 feet (1,245 m) (the floating bridge part)	1994

The former Albert D. Rosellini Evergreen Point Bridge, at 7,578 feet (2,310 m), built in 1963, was the longest floating bridge in the world until the replacement bridge opened in 2016.

== List ==
=== Australia ===
- Hobart Bridge
  - Completed 1943. Spans 3,154 feet (961 m)
  - Spanned the Derwent River at Hobart, Tasmania
  - Constructed of hollow concrete pontoons, it was replaced by a new bridge in 1964

=== Belarus ===
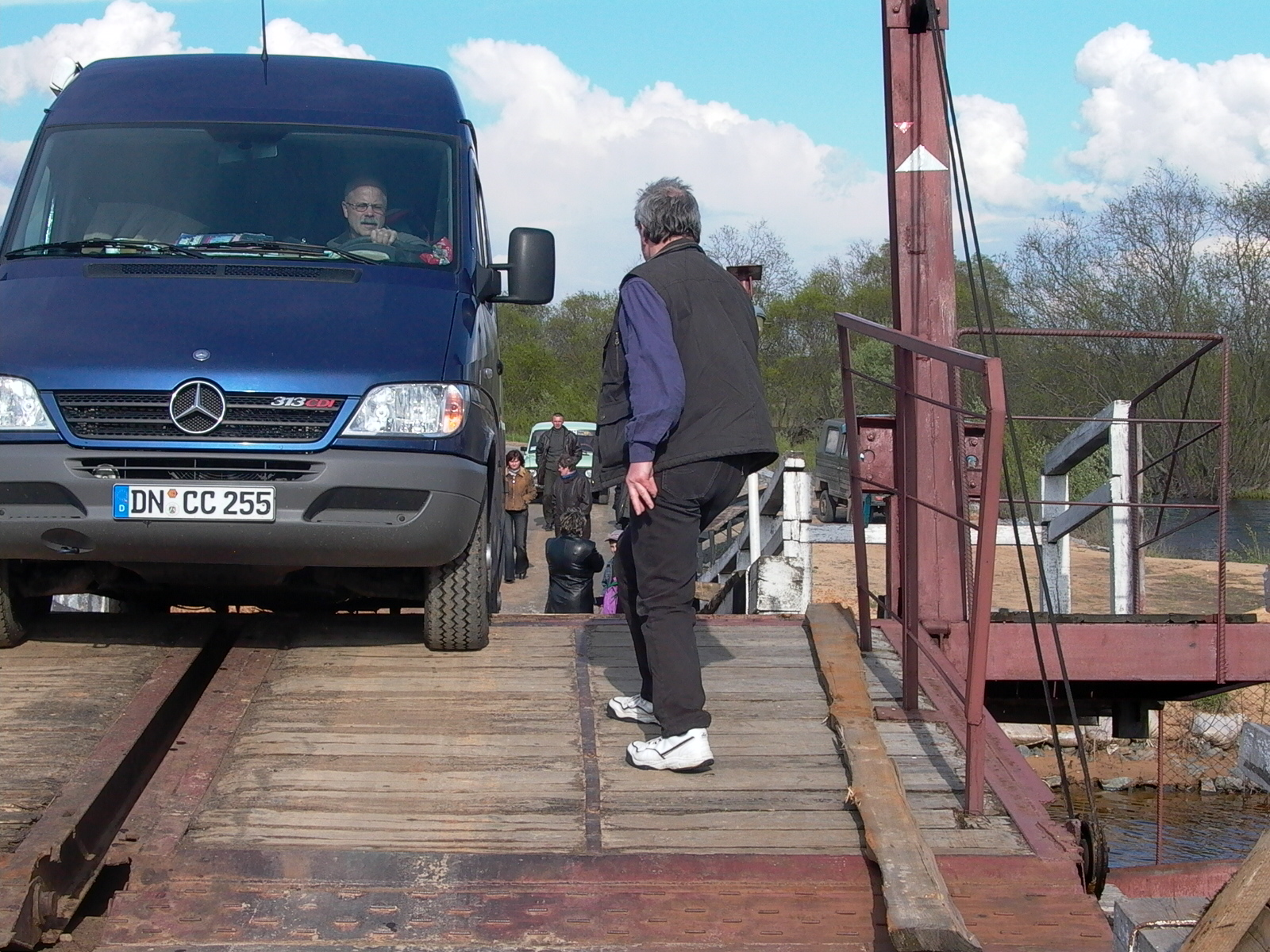
Sozh Floating Bridge in Belarus

- Sozh Floating Bridge
  - The new floating bridge replaced an older one and spanned the Sozh River at Korma, Belarus
  - Built in 2003/2004, carries light automobile traffic.

=== Canada ===
- William R. Bennett Bridge in Kelowna, British Columbia
  - Completed 2008. Spans 1,060 metres (3,478 ft).
  - Spans Okanagan Lake in British Columbia, carrying Highway 97 from Kelowna to West Kelowna. Built to replace Okanagan Lake Bridge, which was the first floating bridge built in Canada. The old 3 lane floating bridge has been replaced by a new, 5 lane floating bridge. The old bridge—Okanagan Lake Bridge—was closed on May 31, 2008.

=== China ===
- Dongjin Bridge in Ganzhou, China
  - Pontoon bridges have been constructed over the Zhang and Gong rivers since the Song dynasty (960–1279).
  - One of the bridges, the Dongjin Bridge, can still be seen.
  - It is 400 metres long, made up of wooden planks placed on around 100 wooden boats linked together with iron chains.
- Guangji Bridge (Chaozhou), China

=== Curaçao ===
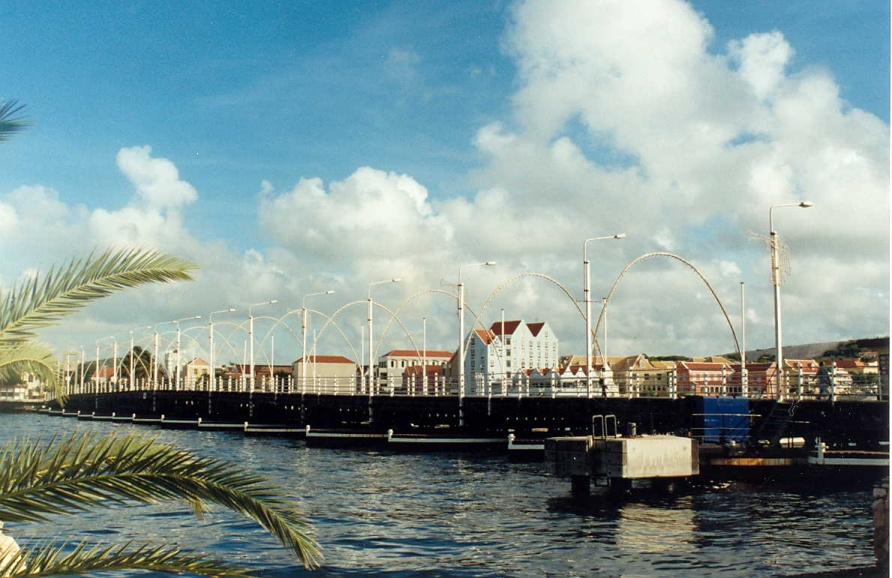
Queen Emma bridge, Curaçao

- Queen Emma Bridge
  - A pontoon bridge from Punda to Otrabanda across the harbor of Willemstad on the island of Curaçao. Notable because this permanent bridge is hinged and opens regularly to enable the passage of oceangoing vessels.
  - Span 548 feet (167 m)

=== Egypt ===
- Martyr Ahmed El-Mansy Floating Bridge
  - A pontoon bridge in the Suez Canal in Ismailia to connect the west and east banks of the canal with two lanes of vehicular traffic and a pedestrian lane.
  - Span 1,148 feet (350 m)

=== Guyana ===
- Berbice Bridge
  - Completed 2008. Spans 5,153.277 feet (1,571 m).
  - Located near New Amsterdam in Guyana.
- Demerara Harbour Bridge
  - Completed 1978. Spans 6,074 feet (1,851 m).
  - Located immediately south of Georgetown, Guyana, it is constructed with steel pontoon units and is the fourth longest floating bridge in the world.

=== India ===
1901 photograph of The Old Howrah Bridge

- Howrah Bridge
  - Completed 1874.
  - Decommissioned 1943
  - This bridge, connected Howrah and Calcutta on opposite banks of Hooghly River, was built using timber on pontoon and was opened to let river traffic through.

=== Norway ===
- Nordhordland Bridge
  - Completed 1994. Spans 4,086 feet (1,245 m) (the floating bridge part).
  - Located on the border of Bergen Municipality and Alver Municipality in Norway, the Nordhordland Bridge consists of a free-floating bridge and a high level cable-stayed bridge. The free-floating bridge has the longest laterally-unsupported span in the world. It is sometimes referred to as the Salhus Bridge.
  - Architect's web site
- Bergøysund Floating Bridge
  - Completed 1992. Spans 3,061 feet (933 m).
  - Located in Kristiansund Municipality, Norway.

=== Spain ===
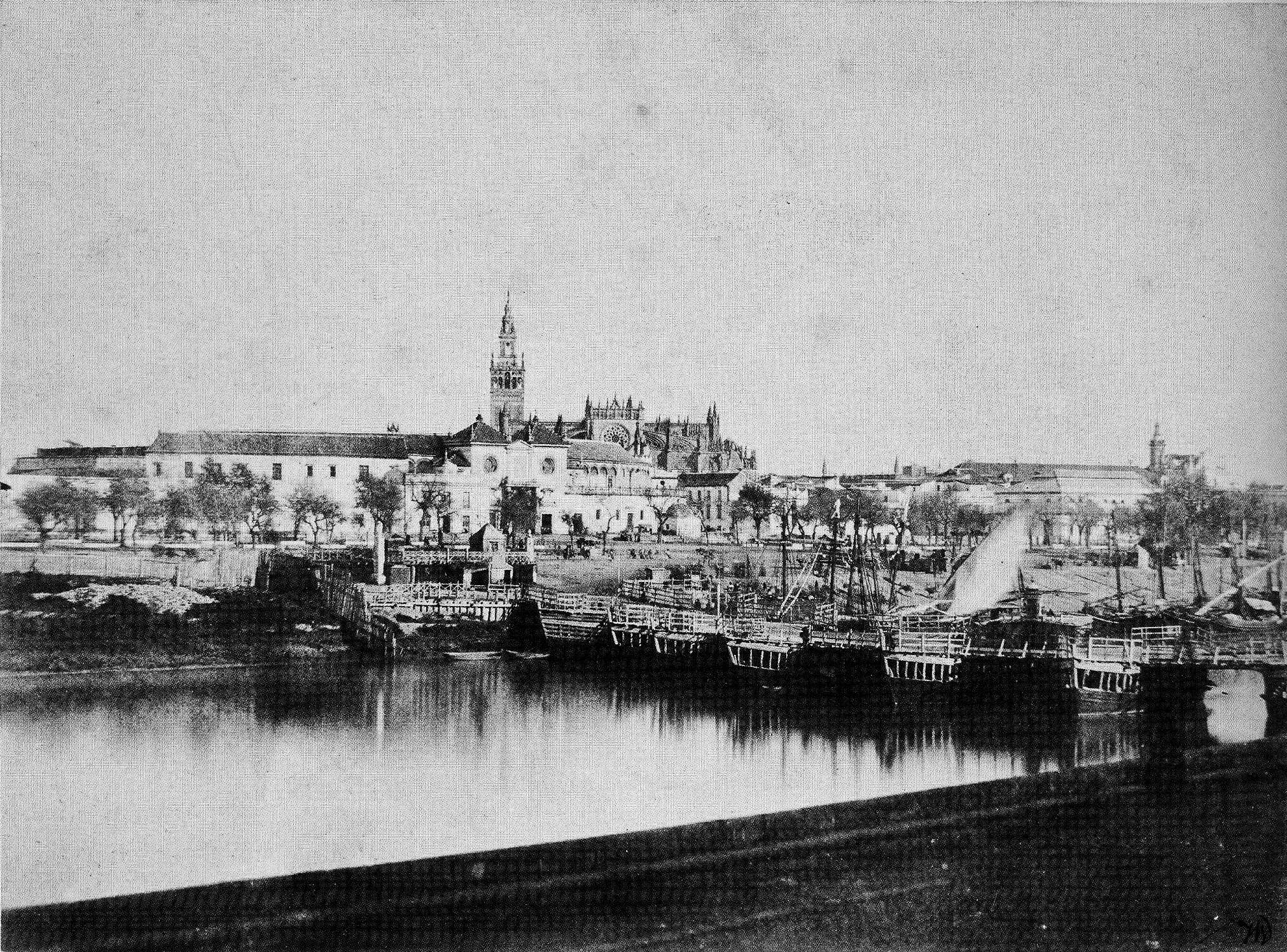
View of the Puente de Barcas in 1851, in the location that it had from the beginning of the works of the Bridge of Isabel II, in 1845, until its dismantling in 1852.

- Puente de Barcas (Boat bridge), Seville
  - Completed 1171, Spans 149 meters (488,8 ft).
  - Moved 1845 for construct Puente de Isabel II
  - Scrapped 1852

=== Turkey ===
- Galata Bridge
  - Completed 1875. Spans 2,985 feet (910 m).
  - Decommissioned 1992.
  - This floating bridge crossed the Golden Horn in Turkey. After it was damaged by a 1992 fire, it was towed up the Golden Horn to make way for the fifth and current Galata Bridge, a bascule bridge.

=== United Arab Emirates ===
- Floating Bridge, Dubai, United Arab Emirates
  - A new floating bridge has been erected over Dubai Creek to ease traffic on over creek crossings in Dubai (United Arab Emirates)
  - The bridge opened to the public on 16 July 2007; two weeks after applying the Salik road toll to the Al Garhoud Bridge.

=== United States ===
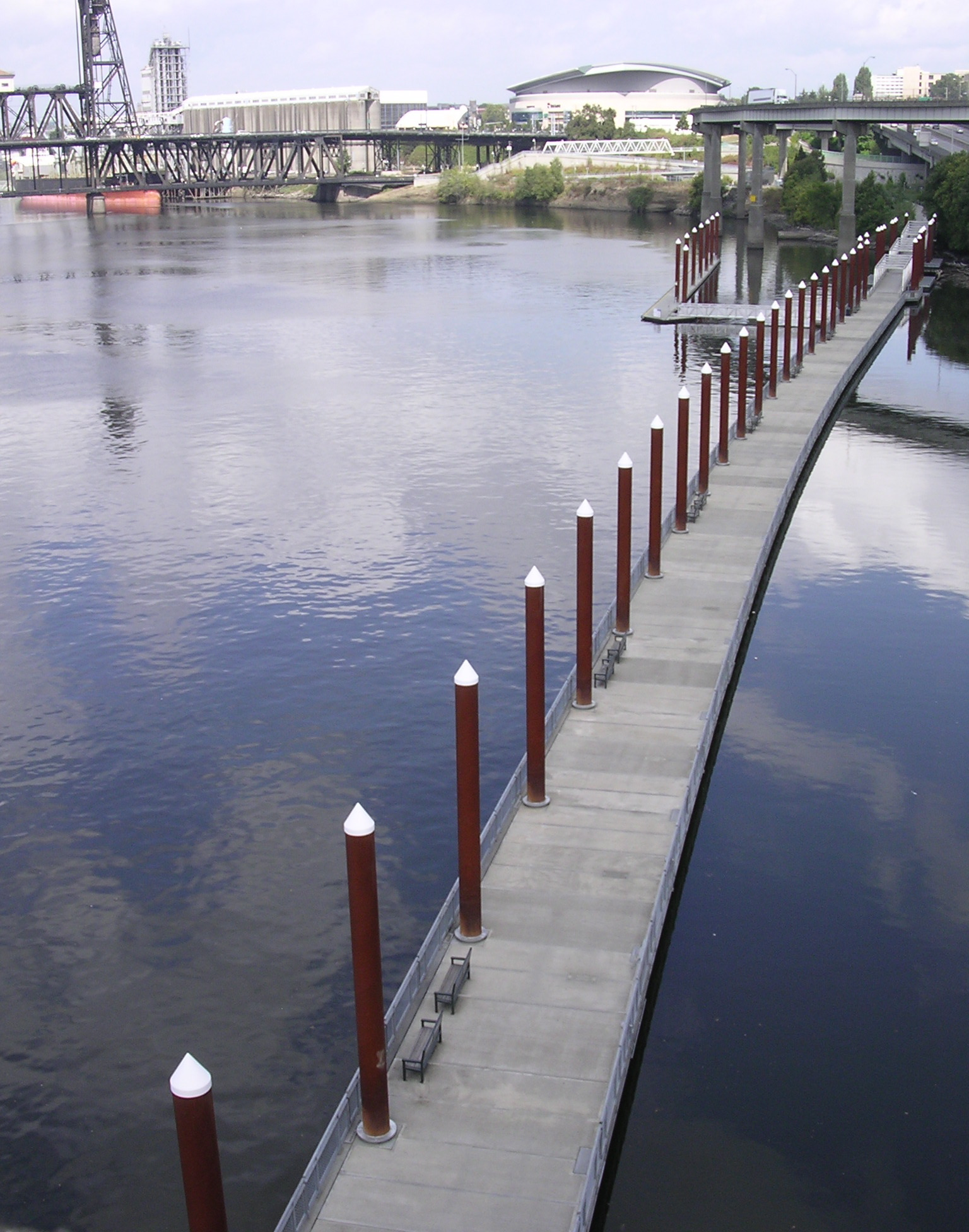
Eastbank Esplanade floating bridge in Portland, Oregon

- Admiral Clarey Bridge, a moveable pontoon bridge that connects Ford Island with Oahu in Pearl Harbor.
- The Dardanelle pontoon bridge over the Arkansas River connecting Pope and Yell counties at Dardanelle, Arkansas.
  - Replacing a private ferry when it opened in 1891, the movable structure operated as a toll bridge. It was used until January 1929, when a toll-free bridge of concrete and steel replaced it at a cost of $600,000.
  - Once considered the longest pontoon bridge in the world at 2,150 feet, its original construction cost $35,000.
  - The original reason for the bridge was the hauling of cotton bales considered vital to the railroad that owned it.
  - Over the years, it was washed away, in parts or completely, many times.
- Governor Albert D. Rosellini Bridge — Evergreen Point
  - Completed 1963. Spans 7,578 feet (2,310 m).
  - Formerly spanned Lake Washington in Washington State, carrying State Route 520 from Seattle to Medina. A toll bridge until 1979, its common name is the 520 bridge or Evergreen Point Floating Bridge. It was the longest floating bridge in the world until 2016.
  - This bridge was removed in Spring, 2017.
- SR 520 Albert D. Rosellini Evergreen Point Floating Bridge (2016 bridge)
  - Completed 2016. Spans 7,710 feet (2,350 m).
  - World's longest and widest floating bridge. Built to replace the 1963 bridge of the same name.
- Lacey V. Murrow Memorial Bridge
  - Original bridge completed in 1940 but sank in 1990 because of weather and mishaps in maintenance.
  - Second bridge completed 1993. Spans 6,620 feet (2,018 m).
  - Spans Lake Washington in Washington State, carrying Interstate 90 traffic eastbound from Seattle to Mercer Island. A toll bridge until 1946, its common name is the I-90 bridge or Lake Washington Floating Bridge. It was the first floating bridge longer than a mile, and at the time was the longest floating structure in the world. It is now the second longest floating bridge in the world.
- Hood Canal Bridge
  - Completed 1961. Spans 6,521 feet (1,988 m).
  - Carries State Route 104 across Hood Canal in Washington state. It is the third longest floating bridge in the world.
  - This bridge broke apart in the February 13, 1979 windstorm. It was rebuilt 3 years later.
- Homer M. Hadley Memorial Bridge
  - Completed 1989. Spans 5,811 feet (1,771 m).
  - Spans Lake Washington in Washington state, carrying Interstate 90 traffic westbound from Mercer Island to Seattle. It runs parallel to the Lacey V. Murrow Memorial Bridge, which carries eastbound Interstate 90 Traffic, and is also commonly referred to as the I-90 bridge or Lake Washington Floating Bridge. It is the fifth longest floating bridge in the world.
- Eastbank Esplanade
  - Completed 2001. Spans 1,200 feet (366 m).
  - Located in Portland, Oregon, it is the longest floating pedestrian bridge in the United States.
- Sunset Lake Floating Bridge
  - Located in Brookfield, Vermont
  - Built on logs in 1820, then upon tarred barrels in 1884, rebuilt using plastic barrels filled with styrofoam in 1978, carries light automobile traffic. This bridge was closed for replacement spring of 2008, and the current iteration makes use of fiber-reinforced polymer pontoons.
