= List of bridges in Guyana =

Guyana is known as the "Land of many rivers", so bridges are an important aspect of the country's transportation infrastructure. Guyana suffers from infrastructural weakness, and many bridges were poorly built or have failed to receive proper maintenance. The country has one international bridge connecting Guyana to Brazil in the south. Plans have been made to build a bridge over the Courantyne River to connect to Suriname in the east.

This is a list of bridges in Guyana.

- Berbice Bridge near New Amsterdam, Guyana
- Demerara Harbour Bridge near Georgetown, Guyana
- Denham Suspension Bridge, also known as the Garraway Stream Bridge, links Mahdia to Bartica
- Takutu River Bridge near Lethem, Guyana and Bonfim, Roraima, Brazil
