= Amaila Falls =

River in Guyana

Coordinates: 5°22′21″N 59°32′46.6″W

Amaila Falls is located on the Kuribrong River (Potaro-Siparuni Region), a tributary of the Potaro River in west central Guyana.

Waterfall is approximately 45 m wide, the volume is 64 m^{3}/s. Waterfall has formed on the sandstones and conglomerates of Roraima Formation.

A power plant and dam scheduled to be constructed at the falls with assistance from Norway was disputed by the APNU+AFC.
