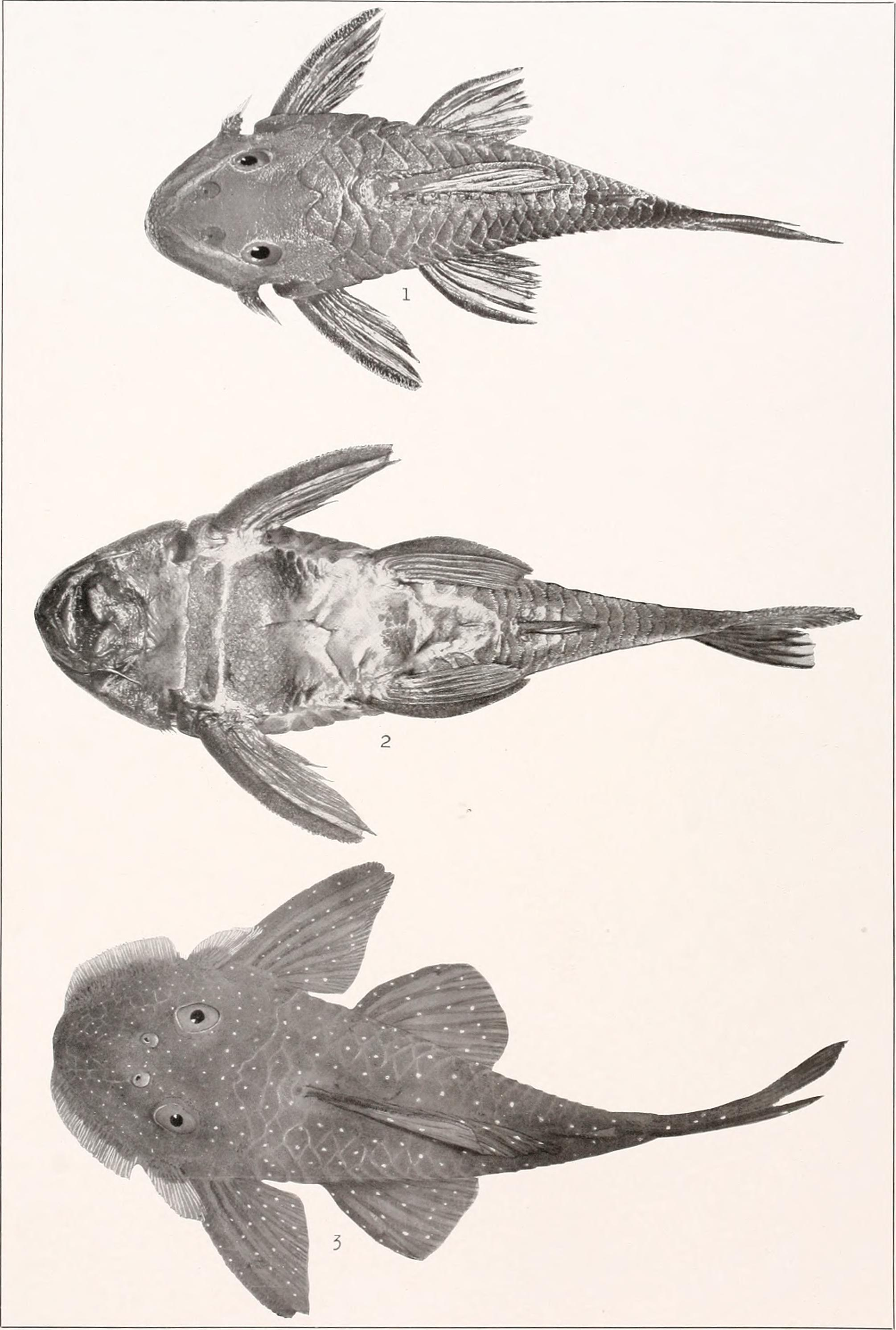
- C. andersoni

Scientific classification
- Kingdom: Animalia
- Phylum: Chordata
- Class: Actinopterygii
- Division: Teleostei
- Order: Siluriformes
- Family: Loricariidae
- Subfamily: Hypostominae
- Genus: Corymbophanes; C. H. Eigenmann, 1909

Type species
- Corymbophanes andersoni C. H. Eigenmann, 1909

= Corymbophanes =

Genus of fishes

Corymbophanes is a genus of freshwater ray-finned fishes belonging to the family Loricariidae, the suckermouth armored catfishes, and the subfamily Hypostominae, the suckermouth catfishes. The catfishes in this genus are endemic to Guyana.

== Taxonomy ==
Corymbophanes and its type species, C. andersoni, were first described in 1909 by Carl H. Eigenmann. In 2000, they were redescribed along with the description of a new species, C. kaiei. In 2004, the tribe Corymbophanini was erected.

Corymbophanes represents an old lineage as it lacks many of the characteristics of the rest of the subfamily Hypostominae. This group probably has a basal position within the subfamily. Corymbophanes was originally placed in its own tribe Corymbophanini, but the first comprehensive molecular phylogenetic analysis of the subfamily Hypostominae found Corymbophanes to be nested within the tribe Ancistrini. However, Eschmeyer's Catalog of Fishes does not recognize tribes within the subfamily Hypostominae.

== Species ==
There were previously two recognized species in this genus. A third species was described in a 2020 study.

- Corymbophanes ameliae Lujan, Armbruster, Werneke, Teixeira & Lovejoy, 2020
- Corymbophanes andersoni C. H. Eigenmann, 1909
- Corymbophanes kaiei Armbruster & Sabaj Pérez, 2000

== Distribution and habitat ==
Corymbophanes species originate from the upper Potaro River of the Essequibo River drainage system. C. andersoni is only known from the Chenapou Falls of this river. C. kaiei is only known from the Oung Creek, a small tributary of the Potaro River drainage. Neither of these species are found downstream of the Kaieteur Falls. Corymbophanes species live in swift riffles over gravel and cobble and among submerged logs.

== Appearance and anatomy ==
Like other Loricariids, Corymbophanes species have plates of armor on their body and a suckermouth. Small odontodes are also present along their body. This genus can be distinguished from all other Loricariids by the presences of a dorsal ridge formed by plates between the dorsal fin and the caudal fin, the absence of the adipose fin, as well as the absence of the omega iris that most loricariids possess. Corymbophanes species do not have evertible cheek plates and do not hypertrophied cheek odontodes which are present in many other loricariid species, which differentiates it from the few species that possess the aforementioned ridge.

Species of this genus do not get very large; C. andersoni does not exceed 8.6 centimetres (3.4 in) and C. kaiei does not exceed 6.6 cm (2.6 in). These fish are dark brown to black with white or cream-colored markings. C. kaiei has alternating light and dark bands on its caudal fin; also, this species has a dark-colored abdomen with light vermiculations in adults. By contrast, C. andersoni has no bands on the caudal fin, has no vermiculations, and the abdomen is light-colored.
