= Corymbophanes ameliae =

Conservation status
- Endangered (IUCN 3.1)

Scientific classification
- Kingdom: Animalia
- Phylum: Chordata
- Class: Actinopterygii
- Division: Teleostei
- Order: Siluriformes
- Family: Loricariidae
- Genus: Corymbophanes
- Species: C. ameliae

Binomial name
- Corymbophanes ameliae Lujan, Armbruster, Werneke, Teixeira & Lovejoy, 2019

Species of armored catfish

Corymbophanes ameliae is a species of freshwater ray-finned fishes belonging to the family Loricariidae, the suckermouth armored catfishes, and the subfamily Hypostominae, the suckermouth catfishes. This catfish is endemic to Guyana where it is only known from the Kuribrong River above Amaila Falls. This species reaches a standard length of 10.1 cm (4.0 in). The specific name, ameliae, refers to Amelia, a Patamona girl who disappeared near Amaila Falls, this species occurring above these falls, in the late 1800s; the falls were named after her, although her name was misspelt.
