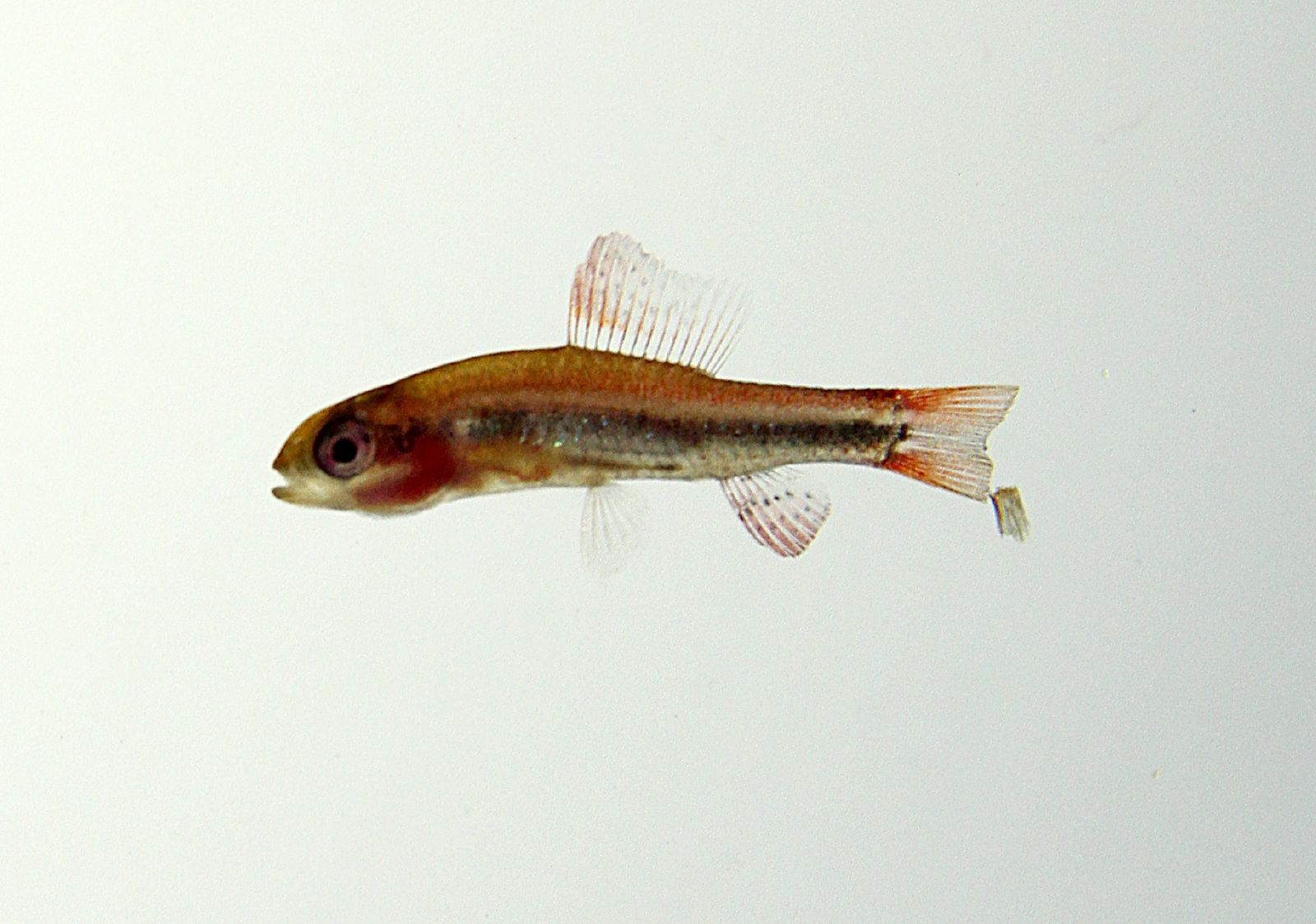
- Poeciliocharax weitzmani

Scientific classification
- Kingdom: Animalia
- Phylum: Chordata
- Class: Actinopterygii
- Order: Characiformes
- Family: Crenuchidae
- Subfamily: Crenuchinae
- Genus: Poecilocharax; C. H. Eigenmann, 1909

= Poecilocharax =

Genus of fishes

Poecilocharax is a genus of South American darters in the family Crenuchidae from the Amazon, Orinoco and Potaro basins. There are currently four described species in this genus. It is one of two genera within the subfamily Crenuchinae.

== Species ==
- Poecilocharax bovalii C. H. Eigenmann, 1909
- Poecilocharax callipterus Ohara, Pastana & Camelier, 2022
- Poecilocharax rhizophilus Ohara, Pastana & Camelier, 2022
- Poecilocharax weitzmani Géry, 1965
