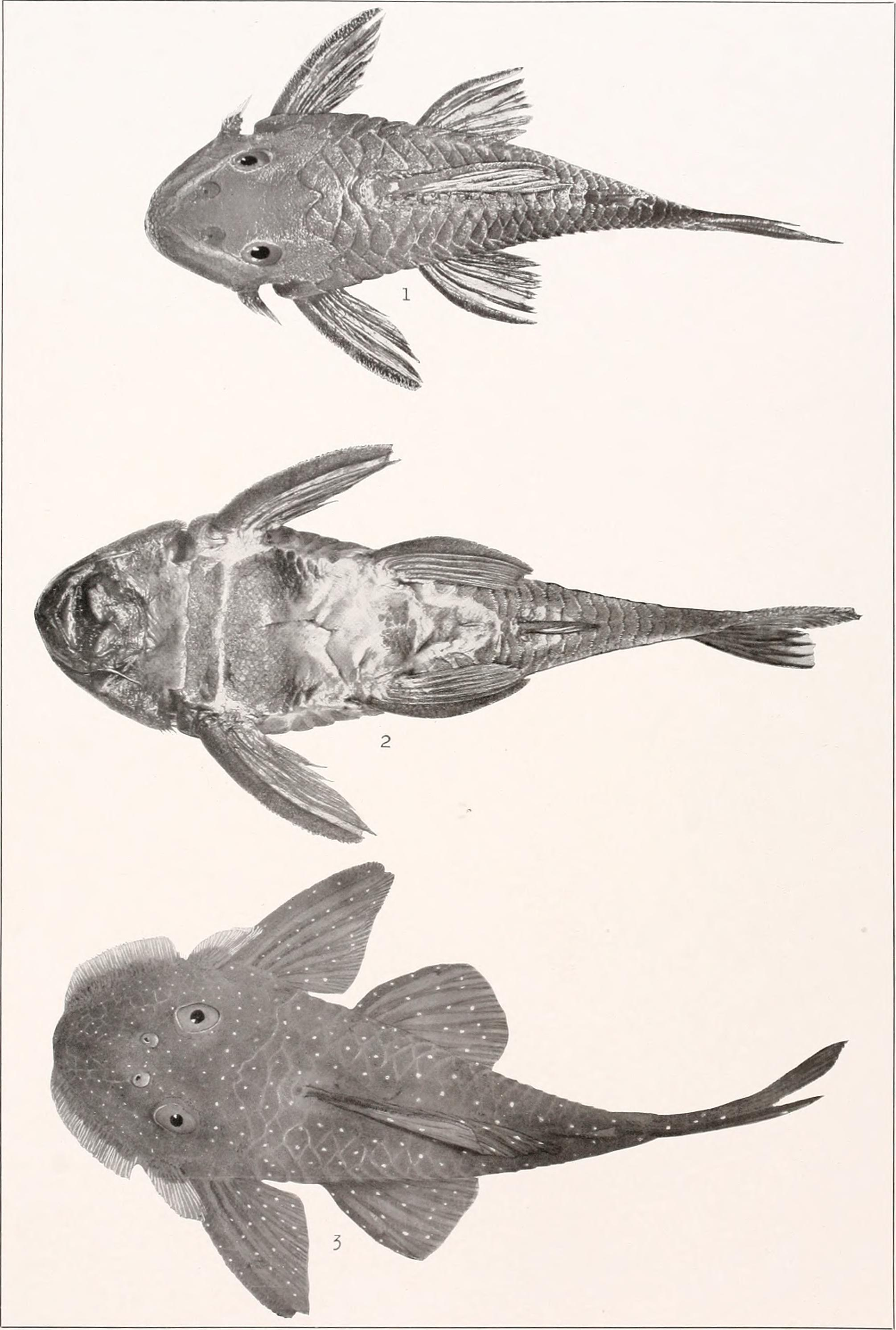

Conservation status
- Endangered (IUCN 3.1)

Scientific classification
- Kingdom: Animalia
- Phylum: Chordata
- Class: Actinopterygii
- Division: Teleostei
- Order: Siluriformes
- Family: Loricariidae
- Genus: Corymbophanes
- Species: C. andersoni

Binomial name
- Corymbophanes andersoni Eigenmann, 1909

= Corymbophanes andersoni =

Species of catfish

Corymbophanes andersoni is a species of freshwater ray-finned fishes belonging to the family Loricariidae, the suckermouth armoured catfishes, and the subfamily Hypostominae, the suckermouth catfishes. This catfish is endemic to Guyana, where it is only known from the Aruataima/Chenapowu Falls of the upper Potaro River. It is found in the main channel of rivers, in areas with a substrate of gravel or cobble. The species reaches a standard length of 8.6 cm (3.4 in). The specific name honours the geologist Charles Wilgress Anderson, a government surveyor.
