= BR-401 (Brazil highway) =

Highway in Brazil

BR-401

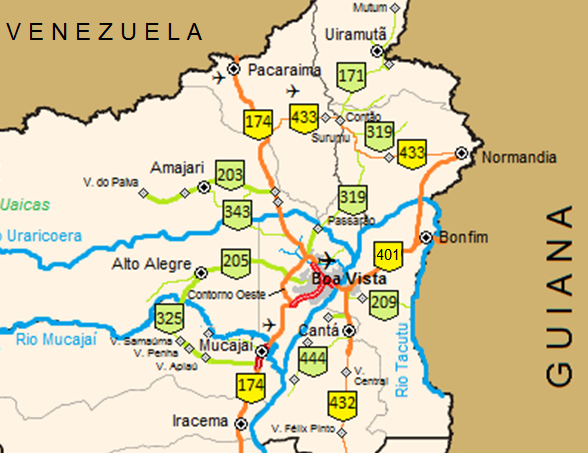

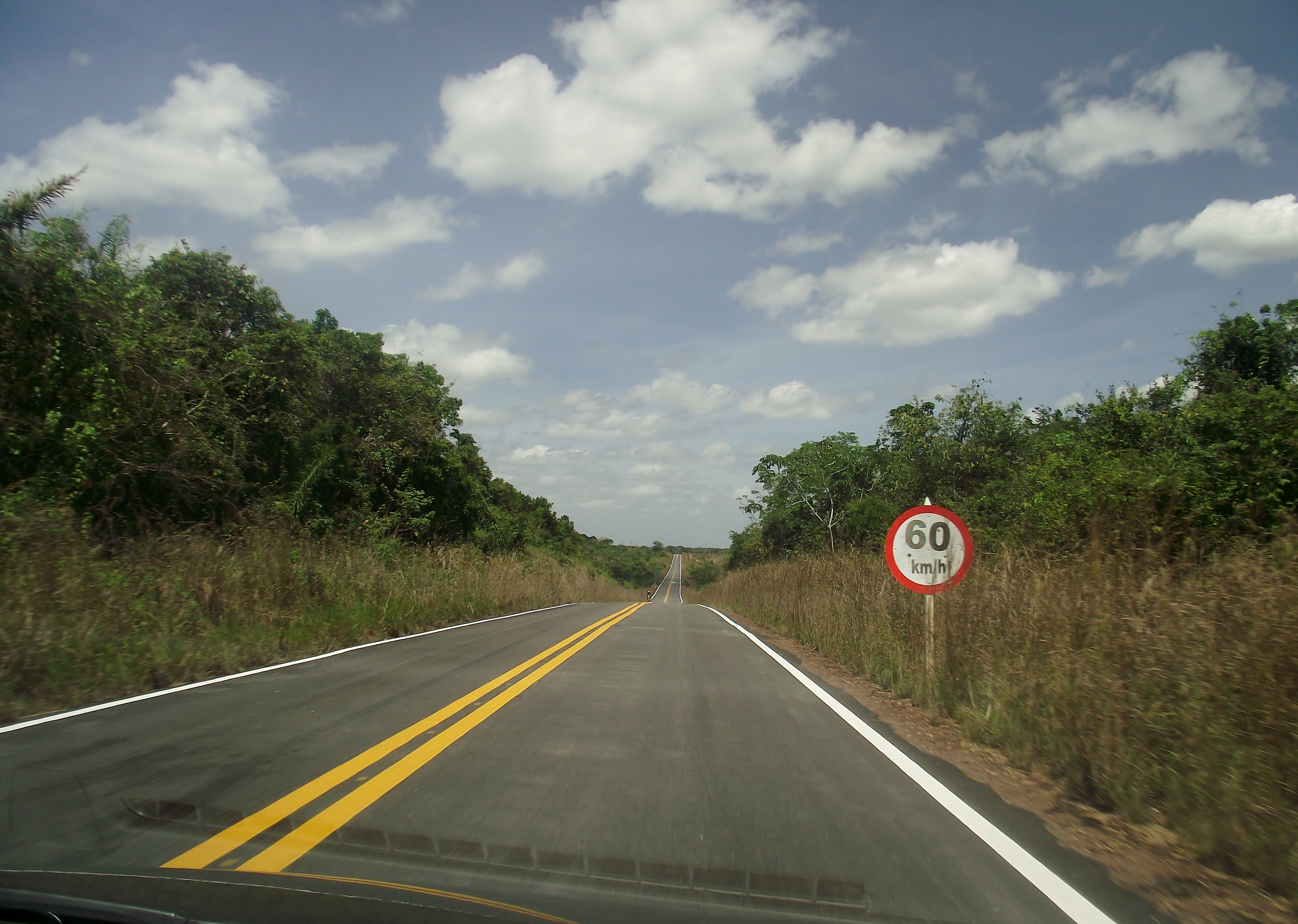

Route information
- Length: 202.9 km (126.1 mi)

Major junctions
- South end: Boa Vista, Roraima
- BR-174 in Mucajaí; BR-432 in Cantá; Bonfim Lethem, Guyana; BR-433 in Raposa Serra do Sol
- North end: Normandia, Roraima

Location
- Country: Brazil

Highway system
- Highways in Brazil; Federal
← BR-393	→ BR-402

BR-401 is a federal highway in the state of Roraima in Brazil. The 202.9 km (126.1 mi) road connects Boa Vista with Normandia and the road network of Guyana.

The Ponte dos Macuxis over the Branco River was completed on 29 August 1975. The Takutu River Bridge was completed in 2009, and provides access to the road network of Guyana. The bridge switches between left- and right-hand drive automatically.

In 2018, the section between Boa Vista and the border with Guyana was fully paved. As of 2020, a section of almost 80 kilometres between Bonfim and Normandia is still unpaved.
