= Corymbophanes kaiei =

Conservation status
- Least Concern (IUCN 3.1)

Scientific classification
- Kingdom: Animalia
- Phylum: Chordata
- Class: Actinopterygii
- Division: Teleostei
- Order: Siluriformes
- Family: Loricariidae
- Genus: Corymbophanes
- Species: C. kaiei

Binomial name
- Corymbophanes kaiei Armbruster & Sabaj Pérez, 2000

Species of catfish

Corymbophanes kaiei is a species of freshwater ray-finned fishes belonging to the family Loricariidae, the suckermouth armored catfishes, and the subfamily Hypostominae, the suckermouth catfishes. This catfish is endemic to Guyana where it is only known from its type locality, a remote location on the upper plateau of the Guyana, the Oung Creek, a tributary of Chenapou Creek, a southern tributary of the Potaro River. This species reaches a standard length of 6.6 cm (2.6 in). The specific name, kaiei, refers to Kaie, a legendary character for whom Kaieteur Falls named.
