= Haianari Creek =

River in Guyana

Coordinates: 5°47′N 58°23′W

Haianari Creek is a west bank tributary of the Demerara River in Upper Demerara-Berbice, Guyana. It enters the Demerara River 90 miles upstream of the Demerara's mouth.

It is categorized as a stream.
