= Demerara River =

River in Guyana

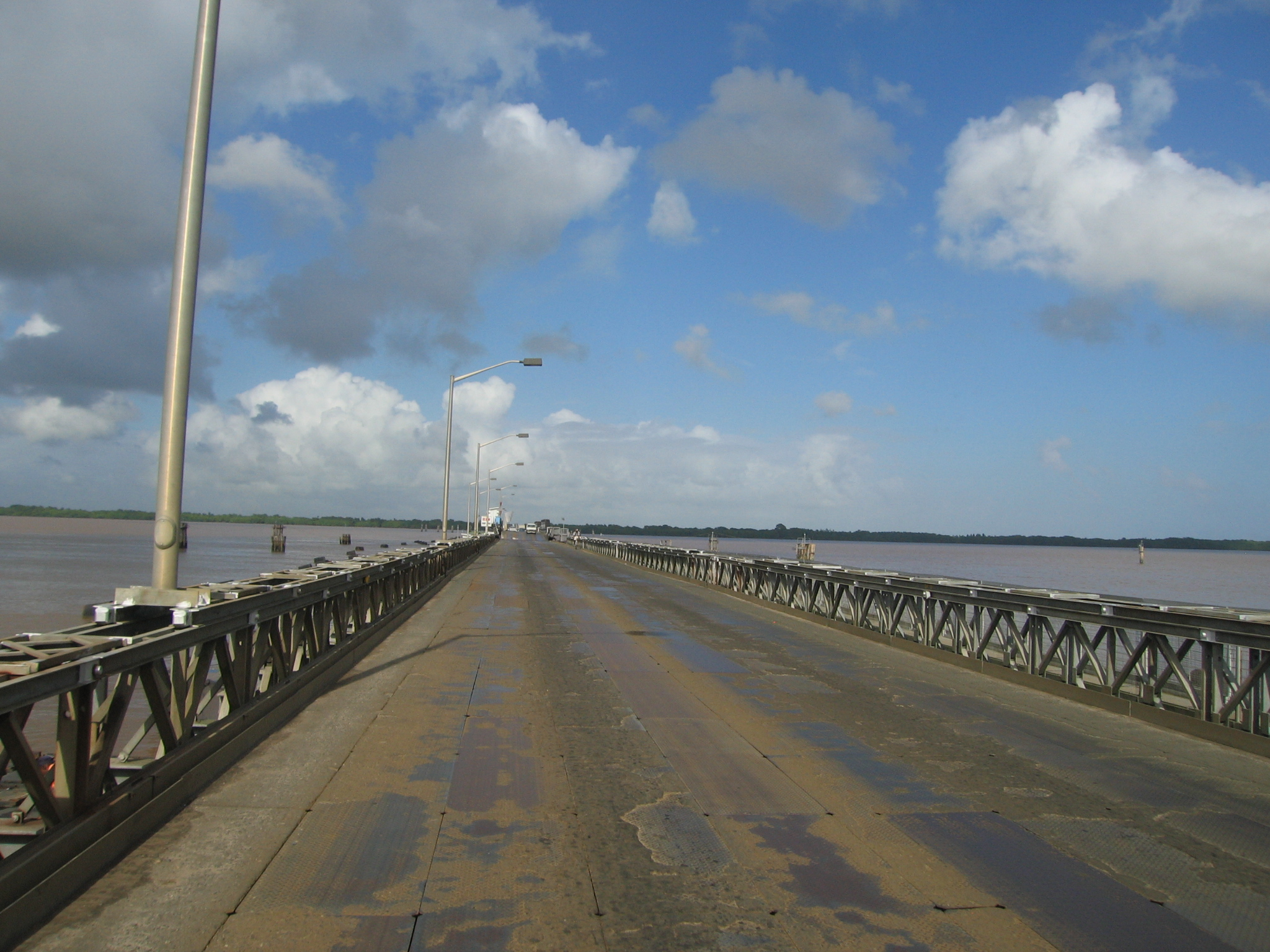
- Crossing the Demerara River via the Demerara Harbour Bridge

- Location of mouth

Location
- Country: Guyana

Physical characteristics
- Mouth: Atlantic Ocean
  - location: Georgetown
  - coordinates: 6.8121°N 58.1701°W
- Length: 346 km (215 mi)
- Basin size: 6,000 km^{2} (2,300 sq mi)
- Discharge
  - average: 150 m^{3}/s (5,300 cu ft/s)

The Demerara River is a river in eastern Guyana that rises in the central rainforests of the country and flows to the north for 346 kilometres until it reaches the Atlantic Ocean. Georgetown, Guyana's largest seaport and capital, is situated on the east bank of the river's mouth. The river divides Essequibo Islands-West Demerara (Region 3) on the west bank from Demerara-Mahaica (Region 4) to the east.

The name "Demerara" comes from a variant of the Lokono word "Immenary" or "Dumaruni" which means "river of the letter wood" (wood of Brosimum guianense tree).

== Features ==
Demerara's estuary is narrow and the flowrate is rapid. This scouring action maintains a 5-to-6-metre-deep direct channel to the ocean. The river's deep brown color is primarily the result of the massive quantities of silt carried from upriver by the powerful currents. So powerful are these currents, that the ocean retains the Demerara's brown color for a considerable distance out to sea.

Tributaries of the Demerara River include the Haiama River, Kuruabaru River, Haiakwa Creek and Haianari Creek.

The islands Inver, Borsselen, and Biesen are found 25 to 30 kilometres (15 to 20 mi) from the mouth. Borsselen was once the location of the Dutch capital of Demerara.

== Transportation and use ==
The Demerara's width and depth allow oceangoing vessels up to 5,000 t to navigate up to Linden (105 km from the mouth), while smaller vessels may reach up to Malali (245 km from the mouth). Beyond Malali, numerous rapids make further upstream travel impossible.

A floating bridge, the Demerara Harbour Bridge, crosses the river 6 kilometres (4 mi) south of Georgetown from Peter's Hall, East Bank Demerara to Schoon Ord, West Bank Demerara. This bridge has been replaced by the Bharrat Jagdeo Demerara River Bridge, but remains in place awaiting further disposition.

A Dutch colony of the same name was situated along the river's banks. The colony founded the sugarcane industry that continues to thrive today. Bauxite is also mined around the Demerara, and Linden is a major export centre.
