= Plantation Peter's Hall =

Plantation Peter's Hall Georgetown
- Coffee and sugar plantation
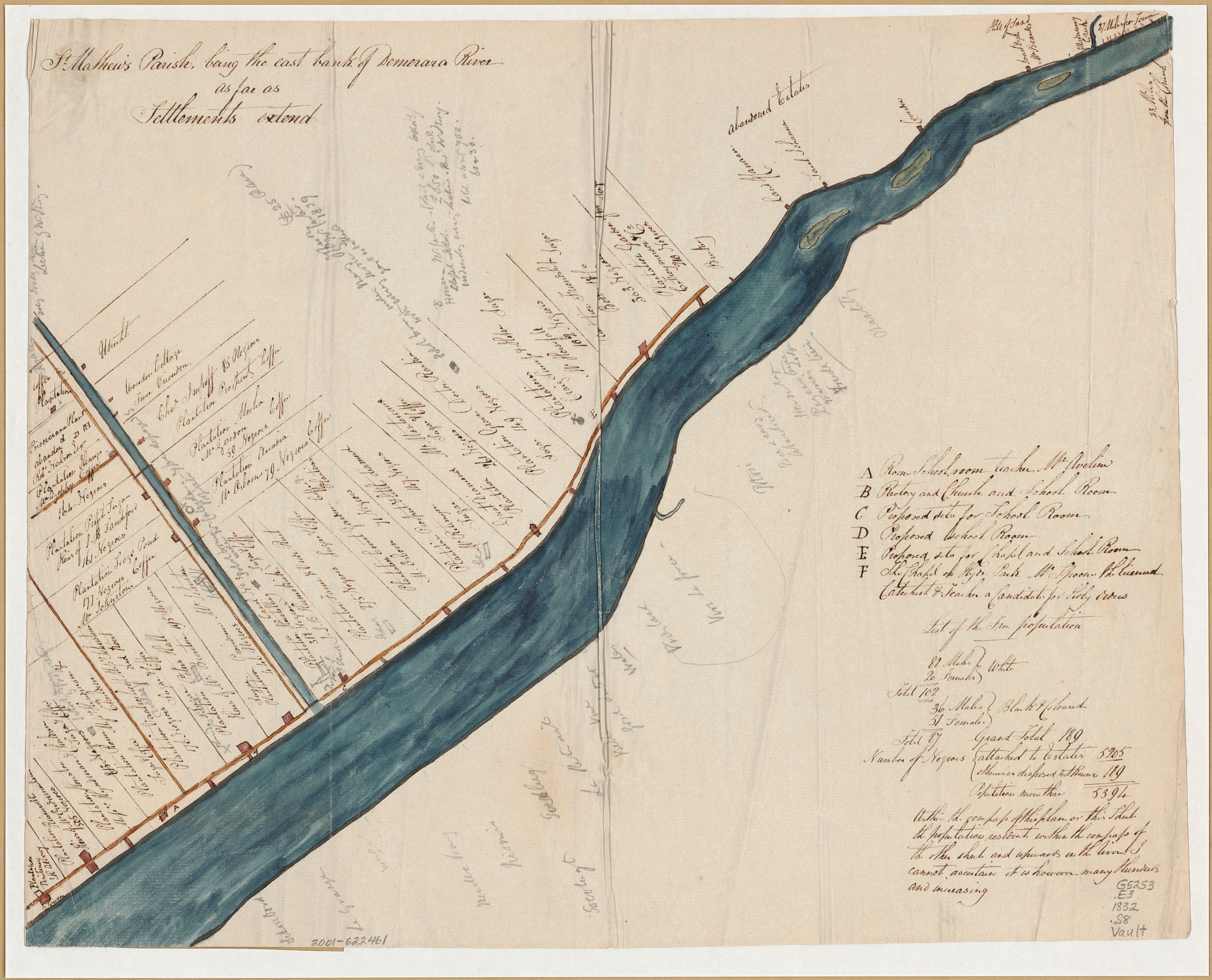
- Plantation Peter's Hall (marked B, bottom left) on a map of St. Mathew's Parish, Demerara River east bank, 1832. Also showing Canal Number 3.

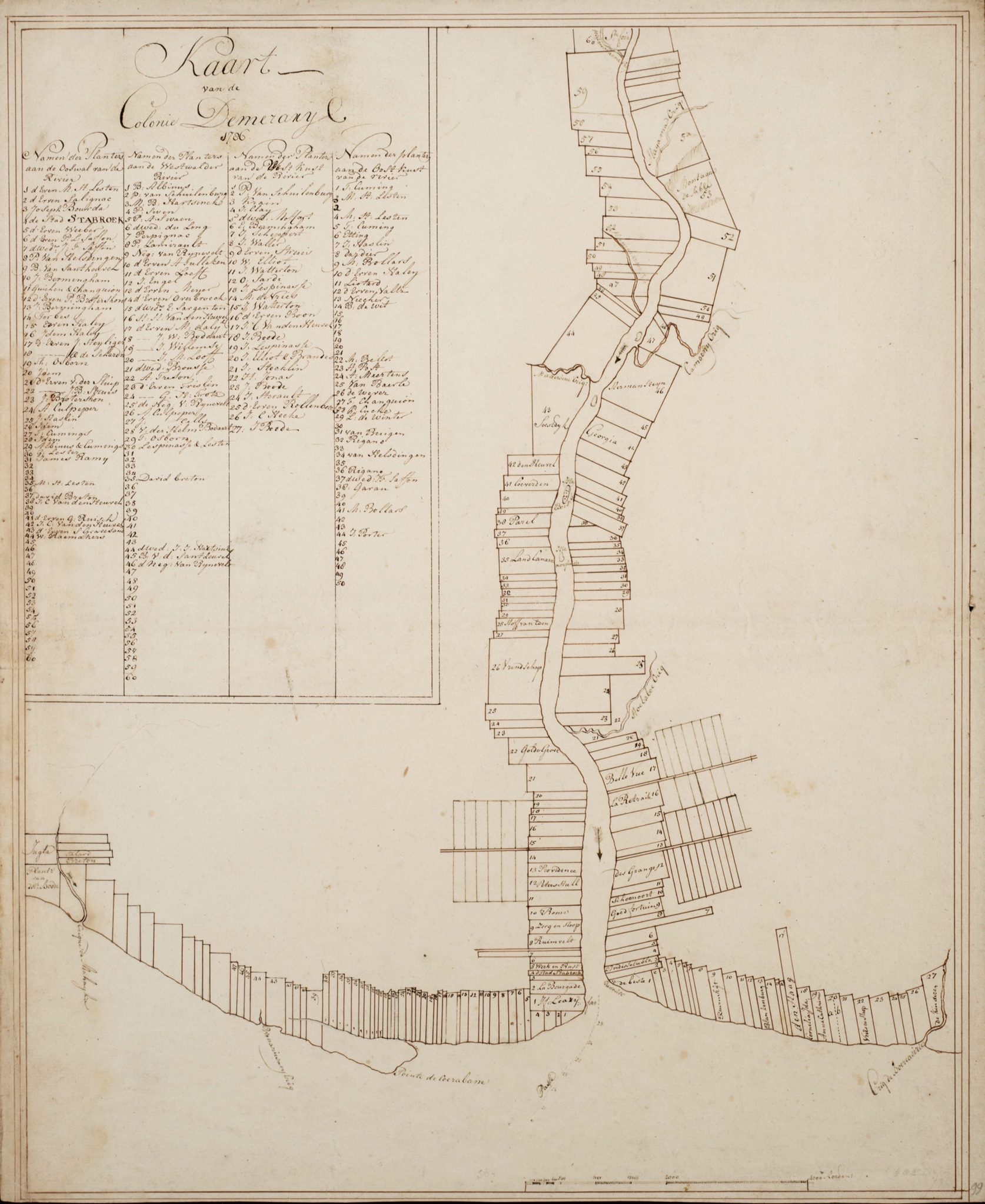
- Kaart van de Colonie Demerary 1786, showing the division of the land adjacent to the Atlantic Ocean and the Demerara River into plantations.

- Location in British Guiana and South America Plantation Peter's Hall (South America)
- Coordinates: 6.771916°N 58.18744°W
- Country: British Guiana
- Established: c.1755

Plantation Peter's Hall was a plantation on the east bank of the River Demerara in Dutch Guiana and British Guiana. It was probably laid out in the mid-eighteenth century and by the early nineteenth century had over 200 slaves before that institution was abolished in the British Empire.

In 1870 it was one of the plantations inspected in detail by the commissioners investigating labour conditions in the colony. They found the majority of the workers to be indentured labourers from India and China. In the early twentieth century its workers participated in the unrest that was seen on a number of plantations in Georgetown.

Plantation Peter's Hall is now the name of a suburb of Georgetown in modern Guyana.

== Early history ==
According to a Dutch map of 1759, a plantation, numbered 12 and named Peeters Hall, was created in 1755 and owned by Pieter Haley. It may be synonymous with the Peter's Hall which appears on the Kaart van de Colonie Demerary 1786, marked plot 12, bordered by the Providence plantation to the south, and the unnamed Eccles plantation to the north.

A 1798 Dutch map shows Peter's Hall as a coffee plantation but the crop later changed to sugar as shown on the 1832 map of St Mathew's Parish by which time the Sage Pond coffee plantation, served by Canal Number 3, had been created to the east behind Peter's Hall. All the original plantations were laid out to be adjacent to water for transport and the irrigation of crops, with three canals (1,2,3) being built from 1775 to allow additional plantations to be created further from the river's edge.

== 19th-century ==
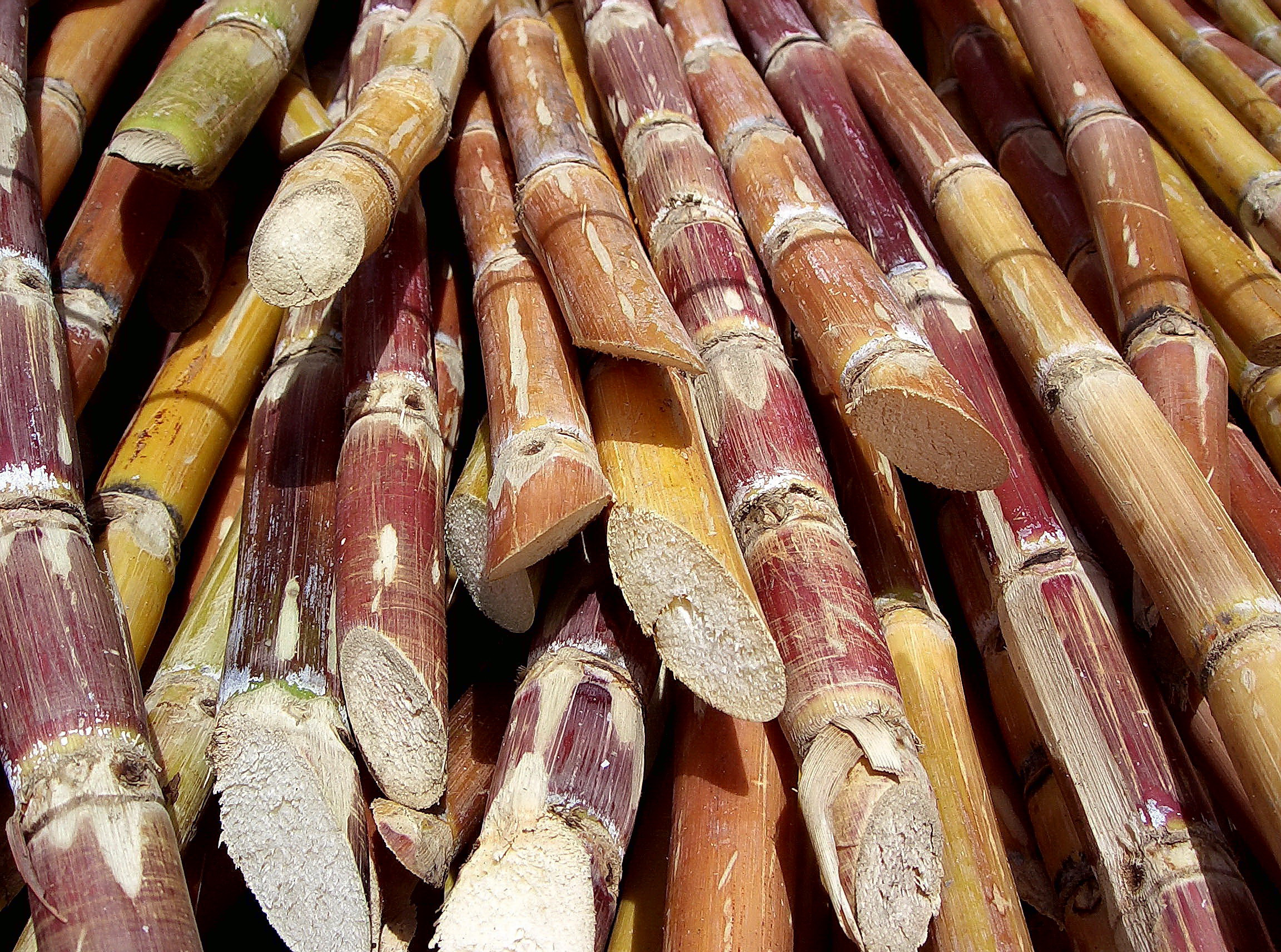
Cut sugarcane

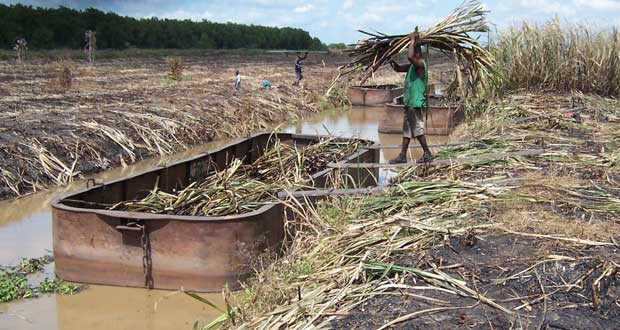
Transporting cut sugar cane

British colonial records show that the plantation had 244 slaves in 1817, 221 in 1826, and 195 in 1832. It was held in 1826 and 1832 by the executors of William Brereton deceased who had died around 1822. The 1832 map of St Mathew's Parish shows "195 Negroes" and a note (B) that the plantation contained a rectory, a church, and a school room.

Following the abolition of slavery in the British colonies in 1833, claims and counter-claims were made in London for compensation for the loss of slaves at Peter's Hall of £9,256.

In 1841, the plantation was sold at auction by court order.

In 1870, commissioners were appointed to enquire into the conditions of immigrant labour in British Guiana following disturbances at various plantations. In October that year they inspected Peter's Hall, then owned by The Colonial Company Limited, and found the plantation's workers to be:

500 male and 140 female indentured workers from India
201 male and 22 female indentured workers from China
35 male and 15 female workers from India who were not indentured.

Among the workers were 60 Indians who had migrated to Guyana after spending ten years in Saint Lucia. They wished to return to India but had been unable to persuade the British government to provide the return passage to which they were legally entitled. Workers often deserted, including 50–60 who were mostly Chinese, and efforts were being made by the manager William Dudley Scott to recover them with mixed success. The facilities at Peter's Hall included a small "hospital", a "gambling room" and a one-room school that the teacher complained the children were discouraged from attending by the driver (supervisor).

The high number of Indian workers may reflect the high levels of Indian migration to British Guiana as planters attempted to replace slave labour freed after abolition. Over 238,000 Indians migrated to the colony as indentured labour between 1838 and the end of the migration in the early 20th century. Most came via Calcutta as there was a strong planter preference for north Indians as south Indians were thought to be weaker and liable to become "hospital birds".

The influential planter Edward Chauncey Luard worked as a manager at Peter's Hall early in his career, co-writing a book, The Overseer's Manual; or, a Guide to the Canefield and the Sugar Factory, that was published in 1882 and explained the extensive irrigation required to grow sugar.

In 1883, The Argosy reported in their survey of British Guiana's sugar estates that Peter's Hall had been enlarged with the addition of the Eccles and Henry plantations and half each of the Profit and Sage Pond plantations making it a "very valuable amalgamation". The paper reported that it had had at least $50,000 spent on improvements and was made up of 937 acres of cane, 166 of plantains, and 260 acres uncultivated, producing a crop of 1,100 hogsheads (990 tons). The uncultivated land included that used for the extensive irrigation and drainage channels that were required due to the water-intensive nature of the sugar crop and the often swampy and flood-prone nature of the area.

According to The Argosy the population of the plantation in 1881 was made up of:

185 Creoles
167 People from other lands
795 Asiatics (Separate immigration returns divide these into 338 indentured, 412 unindentured)

== 20th-century ==
Workers from Peter's Hall participated in labour disputes and revolts in 1911, 1912, and 1913. In a 1924 revolt, labourers "armed with sticks and beating drums" enter the managers' houses at several plantations including Peter's Hall, and made the house servants leave. The riots often had a carnival atmosphere and at Peter's Hall in 1924, the labourers were accompanied by a "foo-foo band". Some European observers thought the participants largely harmless although the colonial government took a more disapproving view and there was sometimes violence from both sides. Academics have seen the parades through the streets, stick waving, drumming, music, revelry, and visiting homes to consume food and drink, as part of a West Indian carnival tradition with African roots even though the participants were by no means all of African descent.

Plantation Peter's Hall is now the name of a suburb of Georgetown. It has been joined to the west bank of the Demerara River since 1978 by the Demerara Harbour Bridge.

The area saw additional development from around 2013 under a scheme known as the Peter's Hall New Scheme.

== See also ==
- Demerara rebellion of 1823
