= Poecilocharax rhizophilus =

Scientific classification
- Domain: Eukaryota
- Kingdom: Animalia
- Phylum: Chordata
- Class: Actinopterygii
- Order: Characiformes
- Family: Crenuchidae
- Genus: Poecilocharax
- Species: P. rhizophilus

Binomial name
- Poecilocharax rhizophilus Ohara, Pastana & Camelier, 2022

Brazilian species of fish

Poecilocharax rhizophilus is a species of fish discovered alongside Poecilocharax callipterus.

== Description ==
Poecilocharax rhizophilus is found in the Apuí region of Brazil. It is around 2 centimeters long. The species is bright amber yellow-brown like other fish in the area. Males have dark streaks on the dorsal fin and anal fins.
