= Arnik River =

Location
- Country: Guyana

Physical characteristics
- Mouth
  - location: Potaro River
  - coordinates: 05°01′00″N 59°32′00″W

The Arnik River is a river of Guyana, a tributary of the Potaro River.

The Arnik River is seen as a common boundary between Amerindian villages of Chenapou and Karisparu. It was a point of conflict when the land title was seen as unfavorable to Chenapou.

The surrounding forest area was a site for balata bleeding.

== See also ==
- List of rivers of Guyana

== Bibliography ==
- Rand McNally, The New International Atlas, 1993.
