= Poecilocharax callipterus =

Scientific classification
- Domain: Eukaryota
- Kingdom: Animalia
- Phylum: Chordata
- Class: Actinopterygii
- Order: Characiformes
- Family: Crenuchidae
- Subfamily: Crenuchinae
- Genus: Poecilocharax
- Species: P. callipterus

Binomial name
- Poecilocharax callipterus Ohara, Pastana & Camelier, 2022

Brazilian species of fish

Poecilocharax callipterus is a species of fish named after its elongated dorsal fins and anal fins. P. callipterus is the first species of Crenuchinae discovered after a gap of 57 years. Poecilocharax rhizophilus was also discovered moments later.

== Description ==
Poecilocharax callipterus lives in the Apuí region of Brazil. The species is around 3 centimetres (1.2 in) long and has a mixture of long red fins, and a black spot on its tail. P. callipterus is sexually dimorphic with males having a vibrant orange coloration.
