= Demerara Harbour Bridge =

Bridge in Guyana

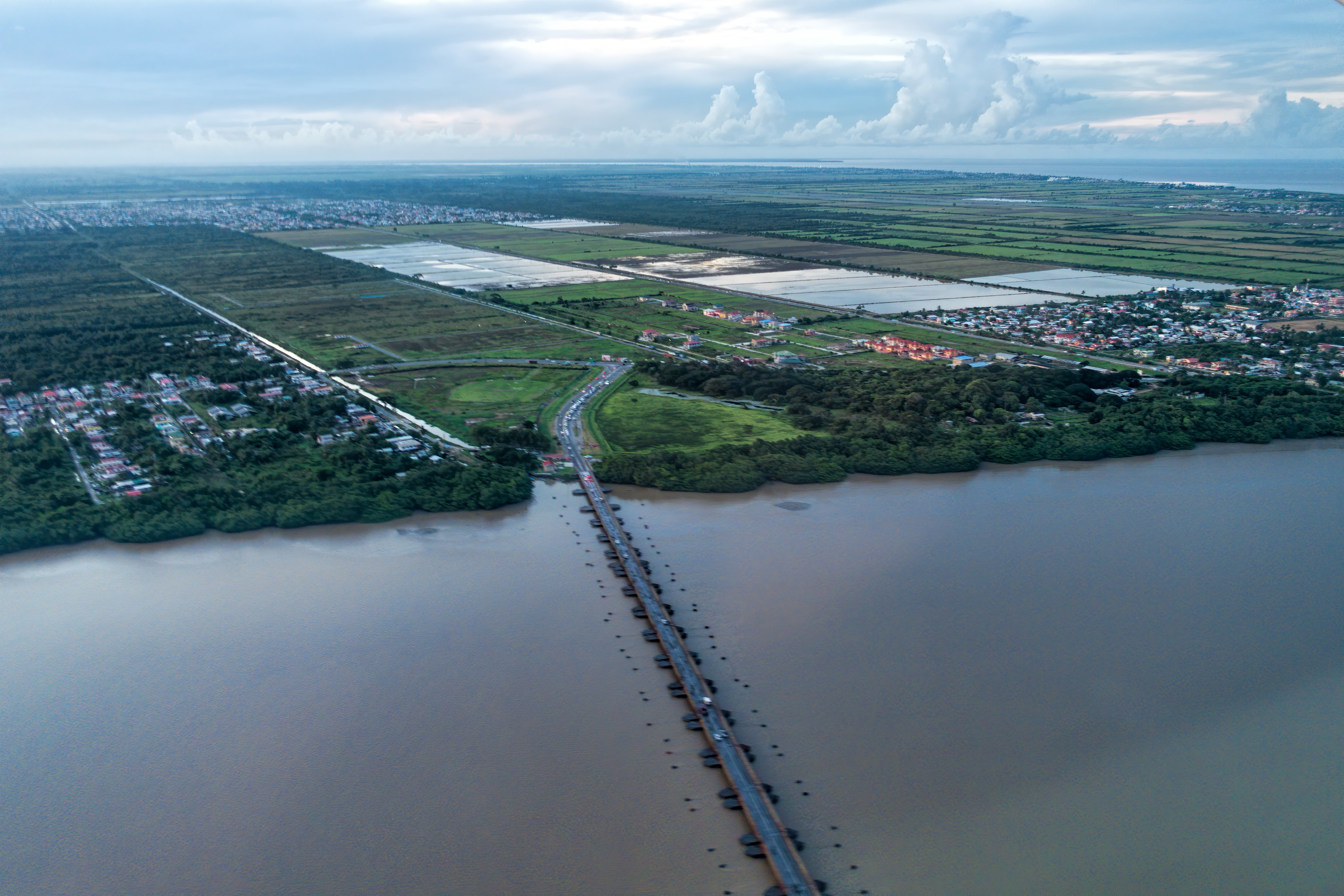
- Demerara Harbour Bridge in 2019
- Coordinates: 6.771916°N 58.18744°W
- Carries: Cars, pedestrians
- Crosses: Demerara River
- Locale: Peter's Hall (Georgetown) to Schoon Ord

Characteristics
- Design: Pontoon bridge
- Total length: 7,000 metres (23,000 ft)
- Height: 7.9 metres (26 ft)

History
- Opened: 2 July 1978

Location
- Interactive map of Demerara Harbour Bridge

The Demerara Harbour Bridge was a 6,074-foot (1,851 m) long floating toll bridge that crossed the Demerara River, joining Peter's Hall to Schoon Ord, Essequibo Islands-West Demerara. It was commissioned on 2 July 1978, and closed on Oct. 5, 2025. There was a pedestrian footwalk, a raised section for small vessels and a retractor for large vessels. It has been replaced by the New Demerara Harbour Bridge, but will remain until its various sections can be used to span various inland rivers.

The bridge has 61 spans. A high-level span provided a horizontal clearance of 32.0 metres (105.0 feet) and a vertical clearance of 7.9 metres (26 feet) to let small craft pass at all times. To let large craft pass, two retractor spans retracted fully once per day to leave a horizontal clearance of 77.4 metres (254 feet).

The number vehicles transiting per day was approximately 9,000 in 2015, and 14,000 as of 2017.

Although the bridge was designed to last ten years, it was so successful that it inspired the Berbice Bridge, completed in 2008.

== History ==
Construction of the Demerara Harbour Bridge began on 29 May 1976. The basic design was by Capt. John Patrick Coghlan, with construction assistance was provided by the British Government. The bridge was only designed to last ten years, yet ended up operating for more than 47 years until its recent closure. Tolls are collected only in east-to-west travel even though the bridge handles one lane of traffic in each direction.

On Monday 23 July 2012 at 06:45 Span 61, the western retractor span collapsed during maintenance work, causing it to partly sink, trapping a minibus. No injuries resulted but as all the larger ferries are decommissioned it caused major disruption.

== Management ==
The Demerara Harbour Bridge was managed by the Management and Monitoring Unit, Demerara Harbour Bridge Rehabilitation Project (MMU), a subsidiary of the Ministry of Public Works (MPW). MMU, however functions independently of the MPW, and maintains a full staff responsible for maintenance, management, construction and operation. MMU also maintains financial independence based on revenue earned from tolls (vehicle and water-borne vessels). They have a staff of about 60 people.

== New Demerara River Bridge ==
In December 2015 tenders were received from twenty-three international and local companies for a new bridge. In August 2017 plans were announced to construct a new bridge two kilometres north of the existing bridge, linking Houston on the eastern bank to Versailles on the western bank. However, breaches in procurement due to "unsolicited proposals" delayed plans. In 2020, a new request for bid was issued, with proposed connection between Nandy Park to the east and Meer Zorgen/La Grange to the west, and construction is now under way. The new Demerara Harbour Bridge project will be officially open on October 5, 2025. This four-lane, high-span, cable-stayed bridge spans 2.6 kilometers across the Demerara River, linking Region Three to Region Four. Built by China Railway Construction Corporation Limited at a cost of US$260 million, the bridge is designed to last 100 years and accommodate vehicles traveling at speeds up to 80 km/h—more than double the speed allowed on the aging Demerara Harbour Bridge it replaces. It opened on Oct. 5, 2025.

== See also ==
- List of bridges in Guyana
