= Poecilocharax bovalii =

Conservation status
- Vulnerable (IUCN 3.1)

Scientific classification
- Kingdom: Animalia
- Phylum: Chordata
- Class: Actinopterygii
- Order: Characiformes
- Family: Crenuchidae
- Genus: Poecilocharax
- Species: P. bovalii

Binomial name
- Poecilocharax bovalii C. H. Eigenmann, 1909

Species of fish

Poecilocharax bovalii is a species of freshwater ray-finned fish belonging to the family Crenuchidae, the South American darters and related fishes. This species is only known from Guyana but it may also be found in Brazil.
