= Takutu River Bridge =

Bridge between Guyana and Brazil

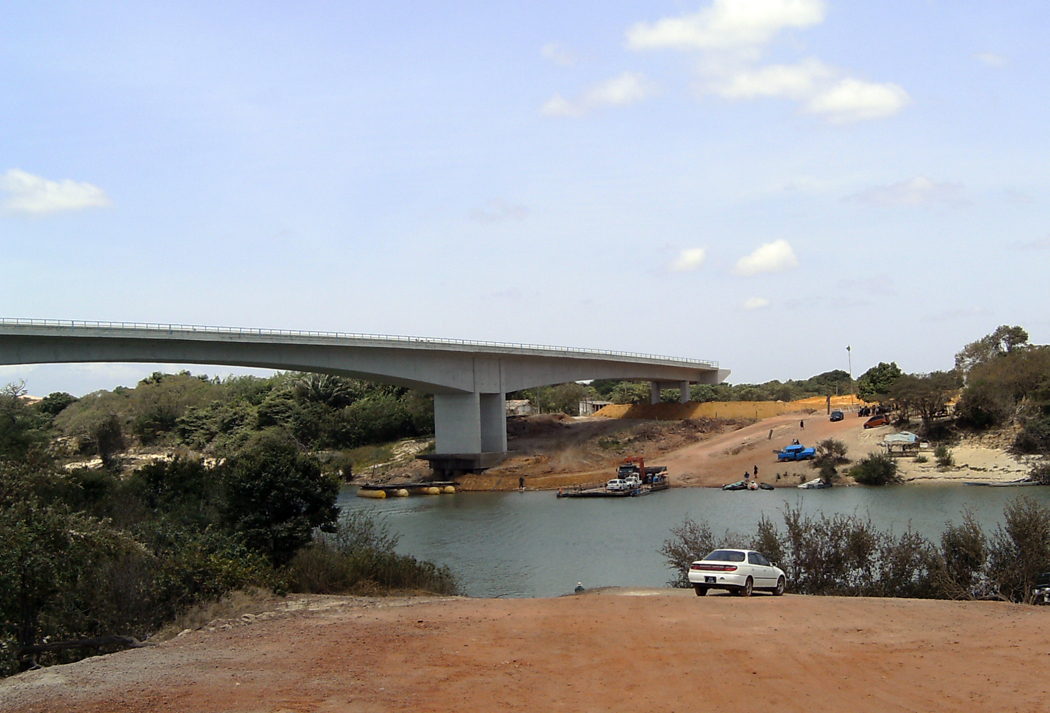
- The Takutu River Bridge from the Guyanese side. The bridge was still under construction in this photo.
- Coordinates: 3.38011°N 59.81438°W
- Carries: BR-401 Cars
- Crosses: Takutu River
- Locale: Lethem, Guyana to Bonfim, Brazil

History
- Opened: 31 July 2009

Location
- Interactive map of Takutu River Bridge

The Takutu River Bridge (Portuguese: Ponte do Rio Tacutu) is a bridge across the Takutu River, linking Lethem in Guyana to Bonfim in Brazil. It was completed in 2009 and opened on 31 July 2009. Its official opening was on 14 September 2009, in the presence of leaders of both countries. It cost US$5 million and was paid for by Brazil. The bridge was a project within the Initiative for the Integration of the Regional Infrastructure of South America.

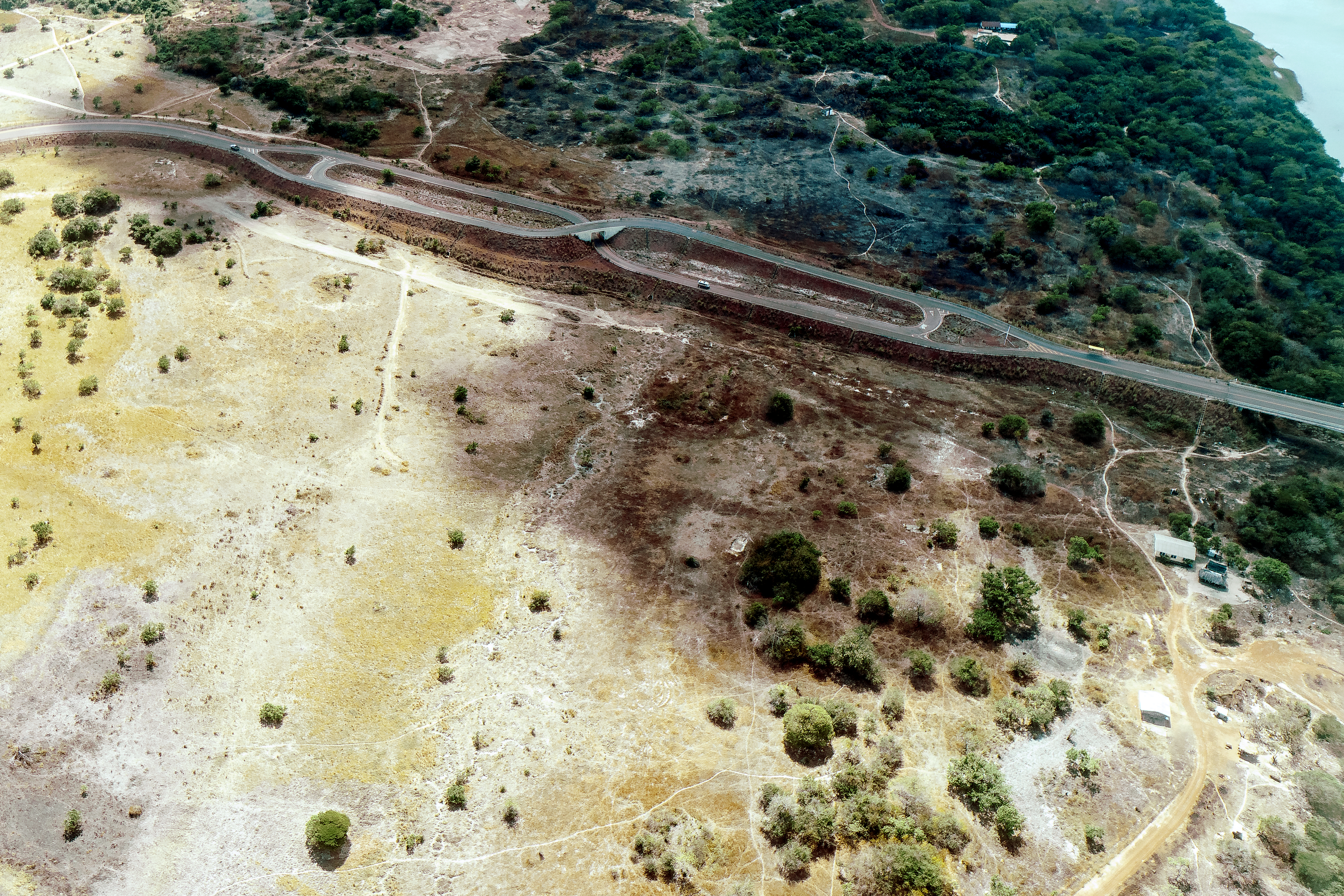
Crossover bridge near the Takutu River Bridge between Guyana (LHT) and Brazil (RHT)

The bridge is the only instance in the Americas of a land border where drivers must change from driving on the left (in Guyana) to driving on the right (in Brazil), or vice versa. The changeover is achieved by means of a crossover bridge on the Guyanese side.

== See also ==
- List of bridges in Guyana
- List of international bridges
