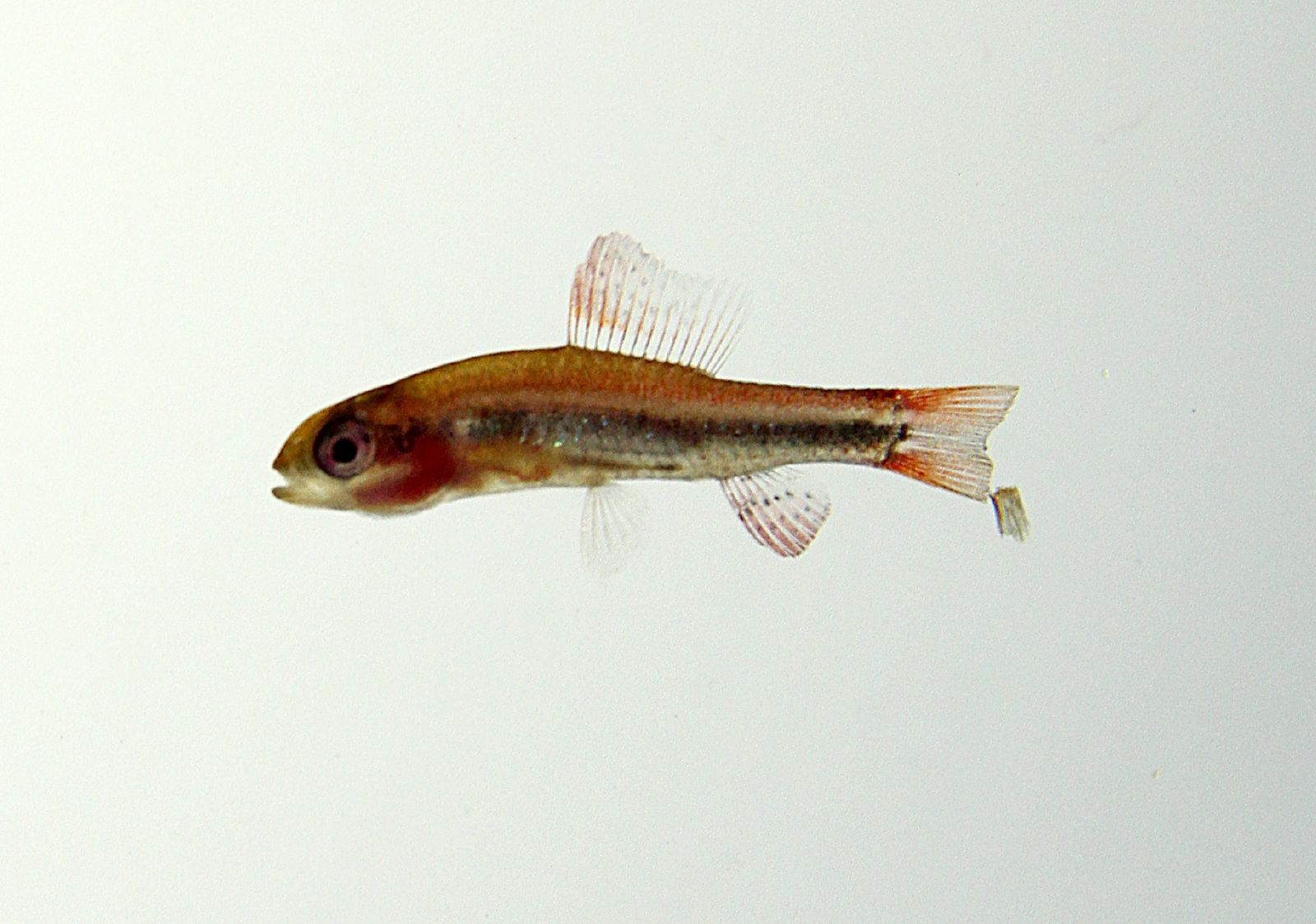

Conservation status
- Least Concern (IUCN 3.1)

Scientific classification
- Kingdom: Animalia
- Phylum: Chordata
- Class: Actinopterygii
- Division: Teleostei
- Order: Characiformes
- Family: Crenuchidae
- Genus: Poecilocharax
- Species: P. weitzmani

Binomial name
- Poecilocharax weitzmani Géry, 1965

= Poecilocharax weitzmani =

Species of ray-finned fish

Poecilocharax weitzmani, the black morpho tetra or black darter tetra, is a species of characid found in South America. The fish was first discovered in 1965.

== Description and behavior ==
The black morpho tetra is a small finned fish. Typical total length is 40 mm (1.6 in) per FishBase, or 40–50 mm (1.6–2.0 in) per SeriouslyFish.

The black morpho tetra demonstrates significant sexual dimorphism, with males growing longer and more colorful dorsal and anal fins.

Unlike many other small characids, the black morpho tetra does not form schools. Males have a tendency to show territorial aggression towards one another.

== In the aquarium ==
Black morpho tetras have successfully been kept in aquariums. They prefer soft and acidic water parameters. They may have difficulty competing for food with more voracious tank mates. Although uncommon, the fish has been reported to have successfully been bred in captivity.
