= Denham Suspension Bridge =

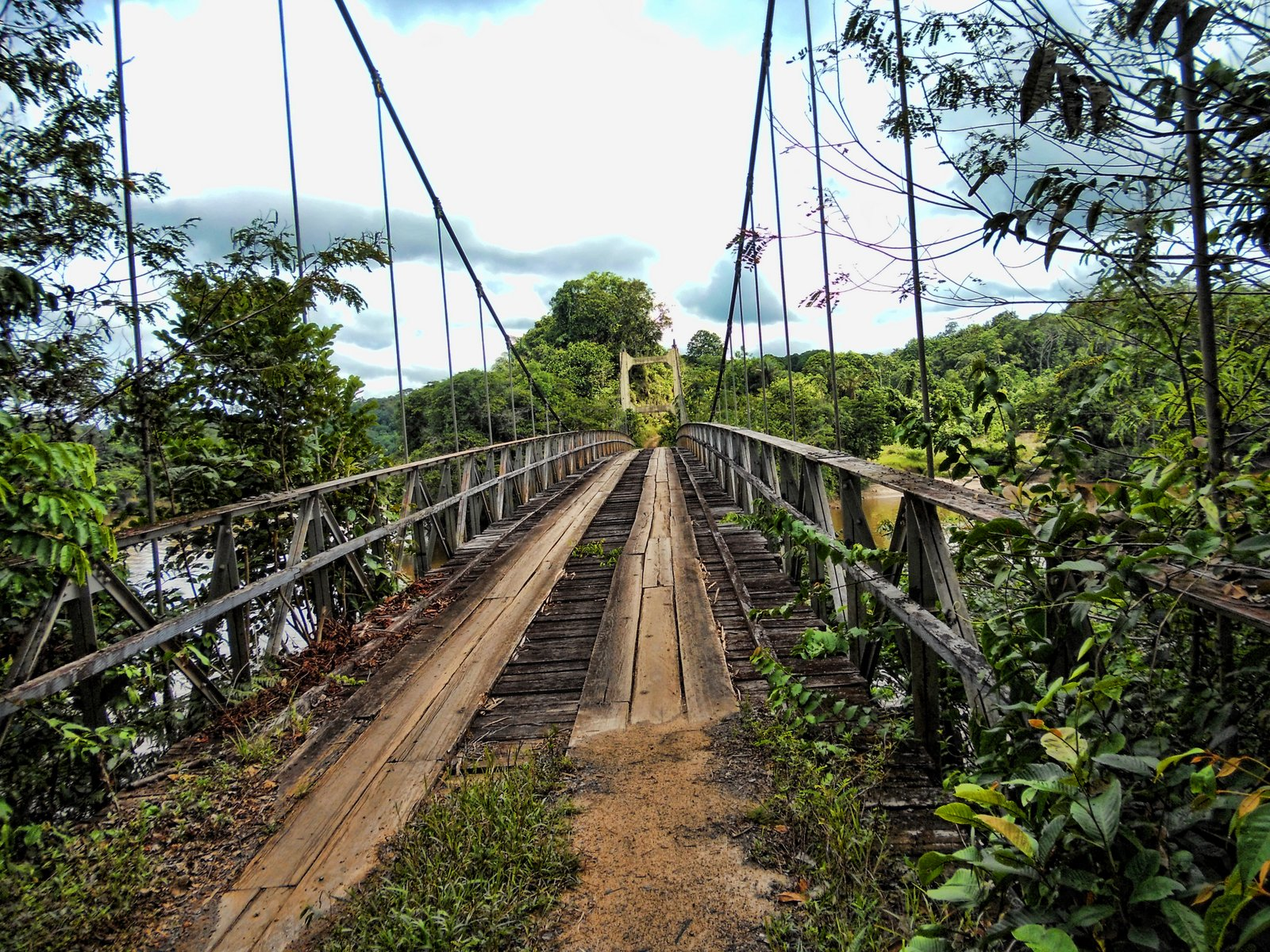
- Denham Suspension Bridge (2011)
- Coordinates: 5.3714°N 59.1239°W
- Carries: Pedestrians, (light) cars
- Crosses: Potaro River

Characteristics
- Design: Suspension bridge

History
- Opened: November 1933

The Denham Suspension Bridge, also known as the Garraway Stream Bridge is a footbridge in Guyana linking Mahdia to Bartica. This suspension bridge was constructed over the Potaro River in an area known as Garraway Stream by a Scottish civil engineer and general contractor, John Aldi, on 6 November 1933.

The namesake for the bridge was the Governor of British Guiana (1930–1935), Sir Edward Brandis Denham (1876–1938), who opened the bridge with golden scissors according to the Montreal Gazette. The bridge and path was meant to shorten the journey to the Potaro gold fields by five days. Miners would later call the bridge the Cassandra Crossing.

In January 2020, the bridge was rehabilitated and reopened for light vehicles up to 10 tonnes. The bridge has been declared a regional monument.

== See also ==
- List of bridges in Guyana
