= Bonfim, Roraima =

Municipality of Roraima, Brazil

Bonfim
- Municipality
- Municipality of Bonfim
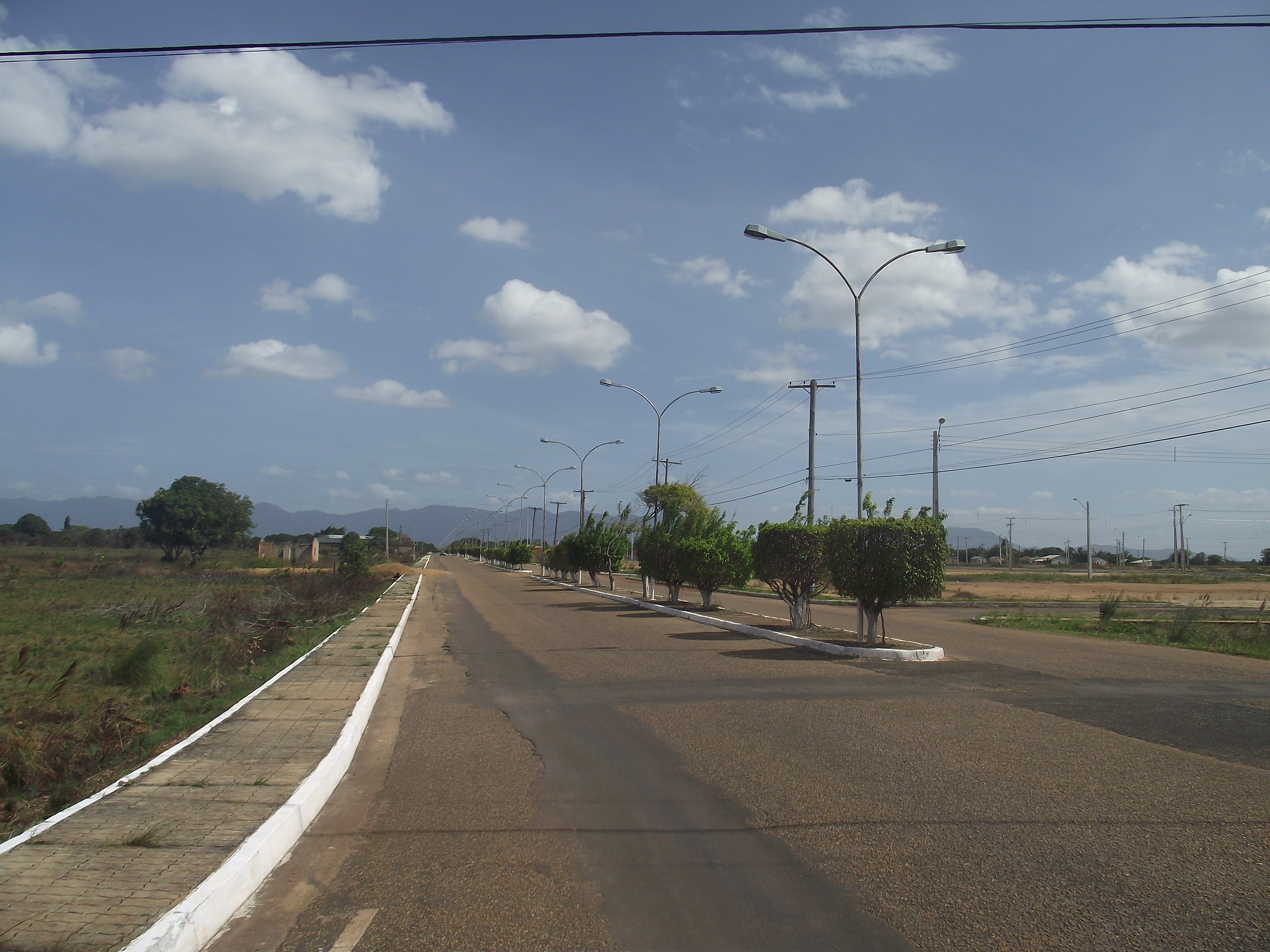

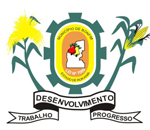
- Flag Coat of arms

- Location of Bonfim in the State of Roraima

- Location in Brazil
- Coordinates: 03°21′36″N 59°49′58″W
- Country: Brazil
- Region: North
- State: Roraima
- Founded: 1 June 1982

Government
  - Mayor: Joner Chagas (PRTB)

Area
  - Total: 8,095 km^{2} (3,125 sq mi)
- Elevation: 92 m (302 ft)

Population (2022)
  - Total: 13,923
  - Density: 1.720/km^{2} (4.455/sq mi)
- Time zone: UTC−4 (AMT)
- Demonym: bonfinense
- Website: bonfim.rr.gov.br

Bonfim (Portuguese pronunciation: [bõˈfĩ]) is a municipality located in the mideast of the state of Roraima in Brazil. Its population is 12,557 and its area is 8,095 km^{2}. The city lies opposite the Takutu River from Lethem, Guyana. The Takutu River Bridge links Bonfim and Roraima with the town of Lethem and the Atlantic port of Georgetown, Guyana.

== Overview ==
In 1775, the Portuguese built Fort São Joaquim at the confluence of the Uraricoera and the Takutu River to prevent the Dutch from advancing into the area. The ruins of the fort can still be seen. In 1790, the Amerindians revolted, and the Portuguese retreated from the region.

Bonfim started with the compound of a religious mission from the United States. On 1 July 1982 it became a municipality by Federal Bill Nº 7.009. On 28 March 2007 it was declared a free port for international trade by President Luiz Inácio Lula da Silva.

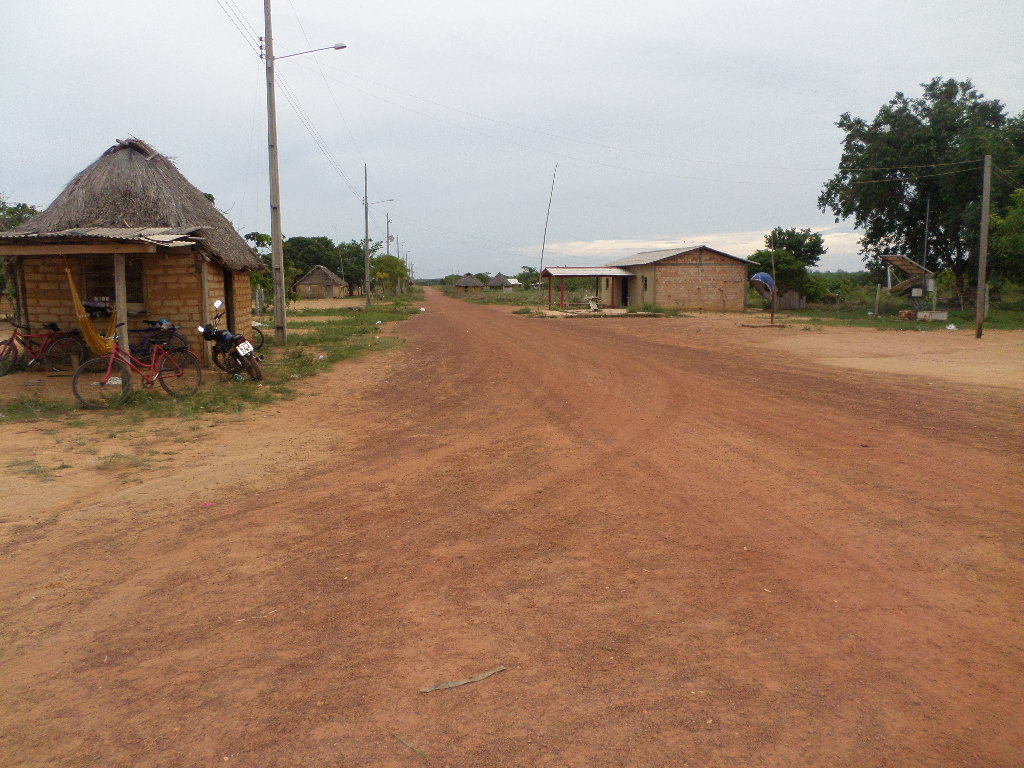
The indigenous village of Moscou

The municipality is home to Amerindians of the Wapishana and Macushi tribes who live in the Wapixana, Macuxi, and Jabuti Indigenous Territories. Many of the indigenous community are tri-lingual speaking their own language, Portuguese and English.

The economy is mainly based on livestock in particular cattle ranching and agriculture which an emphasis on cassava, bananas and cashew.

== Transport ==
Bonfim is connected to the BR-401 which links the road network of Guyana to Boa Vista, the capital of Roraima, located 115 kilometres from Bonfim.
