= Dongjin Bridge =

Bridge in Ganzhou, Jiangxi, China

Coordinates: 25.8678206°N 114.9458206°E

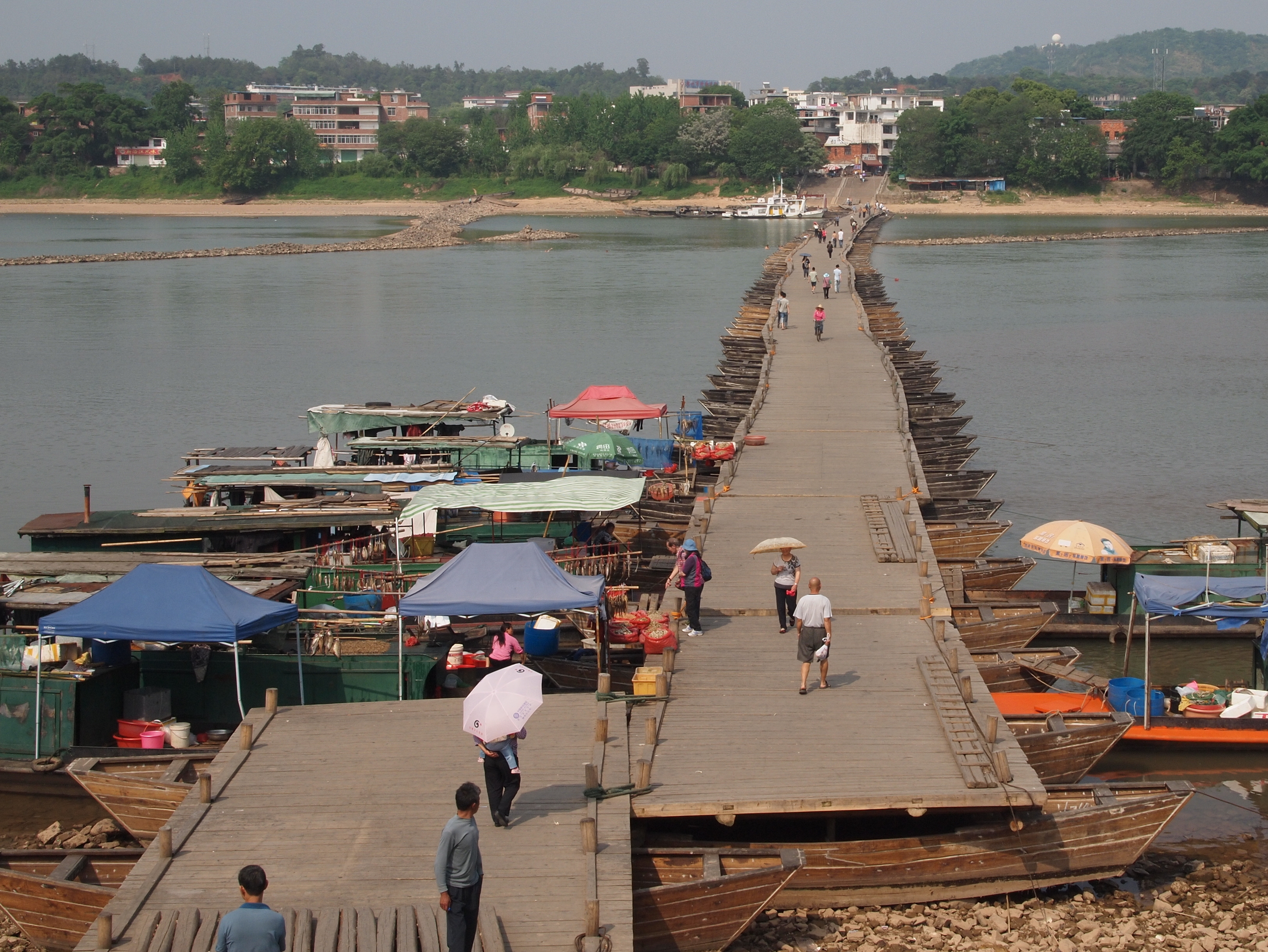
Dongjin Bridge in 2014

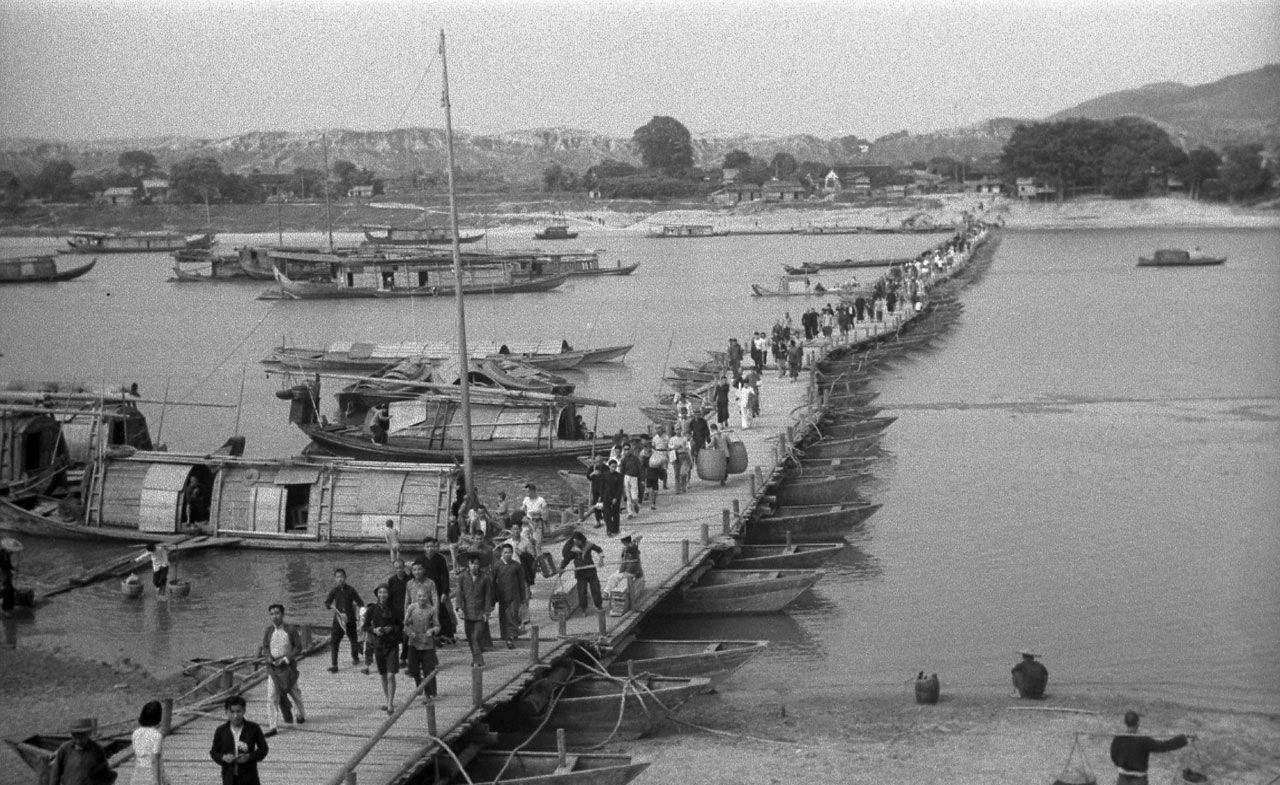
Dongjin Bridge in the 1940s

The Dongjin Bridge (simplified Chinese: 东津桥; traditional Chinese: 東津橋; pinyin: Dōngjīn Qiáo) or Jianchunmen Pontoon Bridge (建春门浮桥) in Ganzhou, Jiangxi province, China is a pontoon bridge constructed over the Gong River in the Chinese Song dynasty (960–1279). Situated outside the Jianchunmen gate of the Ganzhou city wall, it is the survivor of several pontoon bridges found in China.

It is roughly 400 metres long, made up of wooden planks placed on around 100 wooden boats linked together with iron chains.

== See also ==
- Architecture of the Song dynasty
