= Kuribrong River =

Kurubrang River
- Location within Guyana

Location
- Country: Guyana

Physical characteristics
- Mouth: Potaro River
  - coordinates: 5°24′00″N 59°10′00″W

The Kuribrong River is a river of Guyana, a tributary of the Potaro River 2 miles north east of Potaro Landing.

The Kuribrong is a part of the Essequibo River basin, and supports endemic fish species.

The geological make up of the river is schistose quartz-porphyrite and sericite schist, and quartz boulders making up any major river obstruction. The river was deemed to be of low interest for gold mining, to contrast with other rivers of the region.

== Economic use ==
There is a settlement at "Kuribrong River, Mona Falls" with a population of 28 in the 2012 census.

It was considered for a now-defunct hydroelectric project, at the confluence with the Amaila River.

Balata bleeding was once done in the area of the river.

== See also ==
- List of rivers of Guyana

== Bibliography ==
- Rand McNally, The New International Atlas, 1993.
