= Lethem, Guyana =

City in South America

Lethem
- Town and regional capital
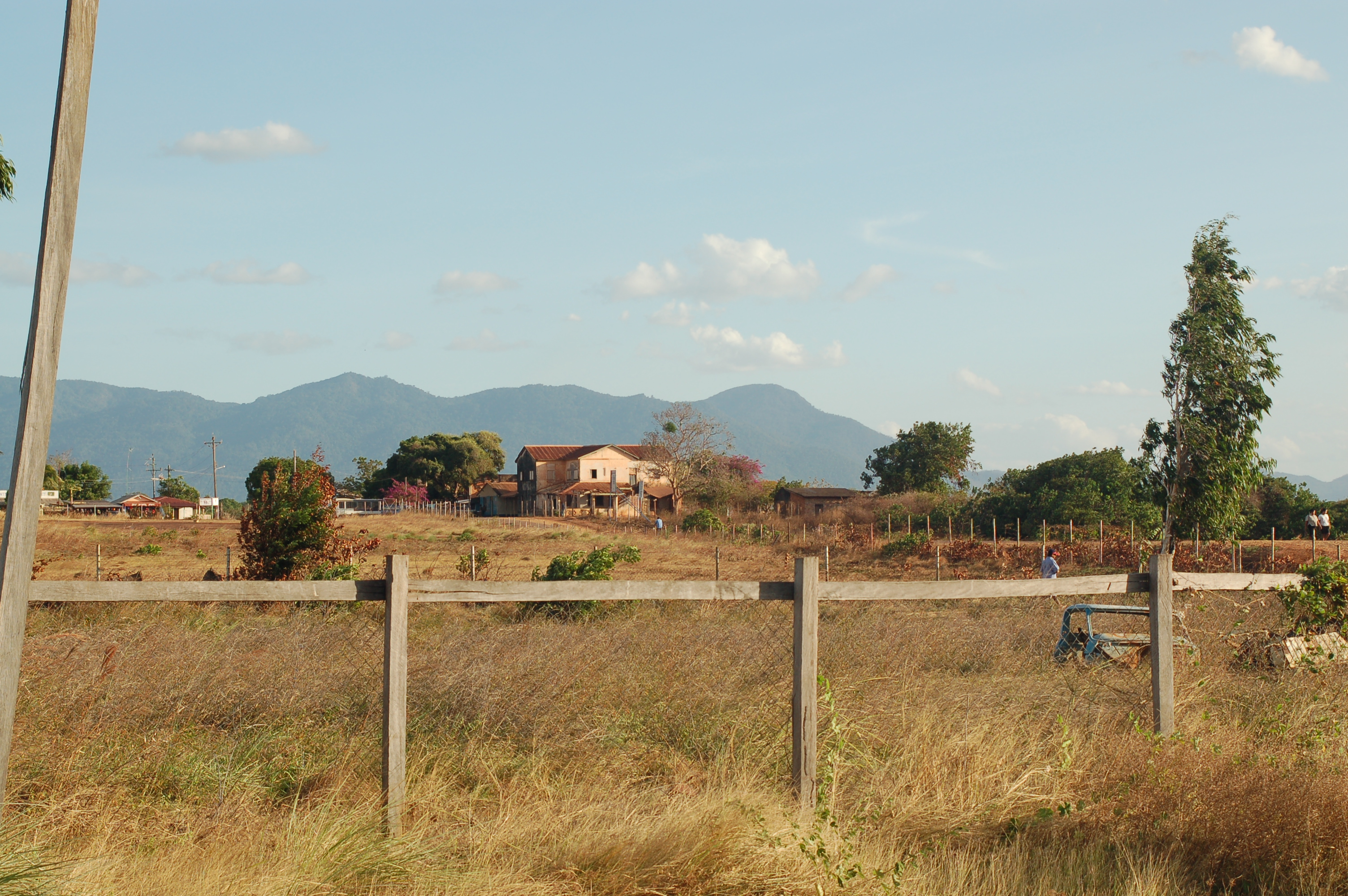
- Lethem looking east

- Location within Guyana
- Coordinates: 3°23′N 59°48′W
- Country: Guyana
- Region: Upper Takutu-Upper Essequibo

Population (2012)
  - Total: 1,702
- Time zone: UTC-4
- Postal code: 16

Lethem is a town in Guyana’s south, located in the Upper Takutu-Upper Essequibo region. It is the regional capital of Upper Takutu-Upper Essequibo.

It is named after Sir Gordon James Lethem, who was the Governor of British Guiana from 1941 to 12 April 1947. The city is populated by 1,702 inhabitants as of 2012.

Lethem has several commercial establishments for shoes, bicycles, shirts and other items; they are especially frequented by Brazilians who usually take goods to Boa Vista, Manaus, Pacaraima and Santa Elena de Uairén.

The annual Rodeo on Easter weekend is the city's main event.

== Environment and economy ==
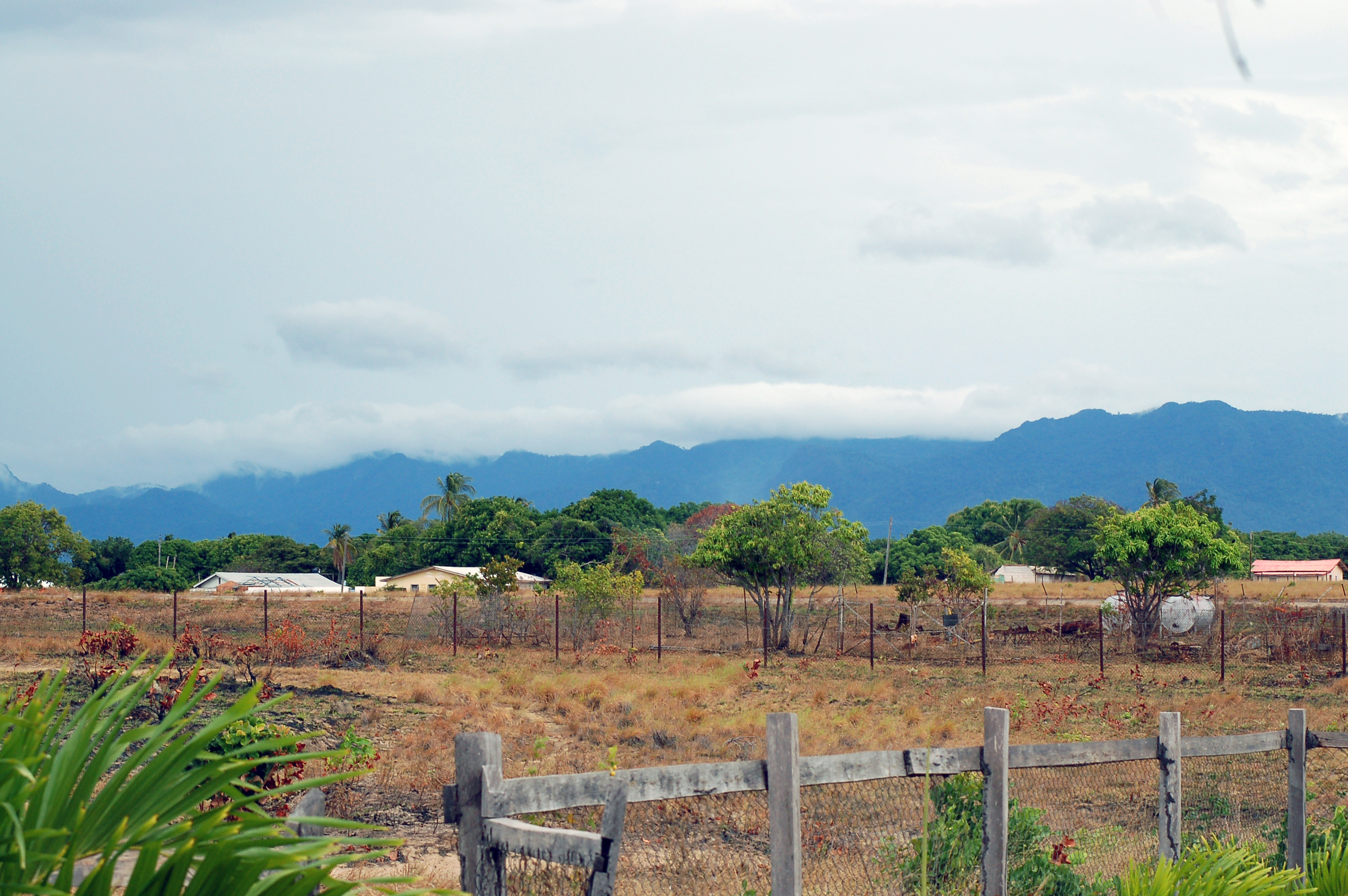
Lethem, looking across the savannah to the south

Lethem is part of the Guyanese Rupununi savannah where there are many vaqueiros (as spoken in the Portuguese language), or cowboys, and ranches. Local flora/fauna includes various types of cashew trees, both the fruit and nut varieties; mango trees and coconut trees are also common. There is a cashew processing plant in St. Ignatius, one of the communities that are a part of Lethem. There is also Culvert City, and New Culvert City, and there are several retail establishments throughout the township of Lethem. Guyanese Dollars and Brazilian Reals, and in some stores, even U.S. currency, are now accepted by merchants.

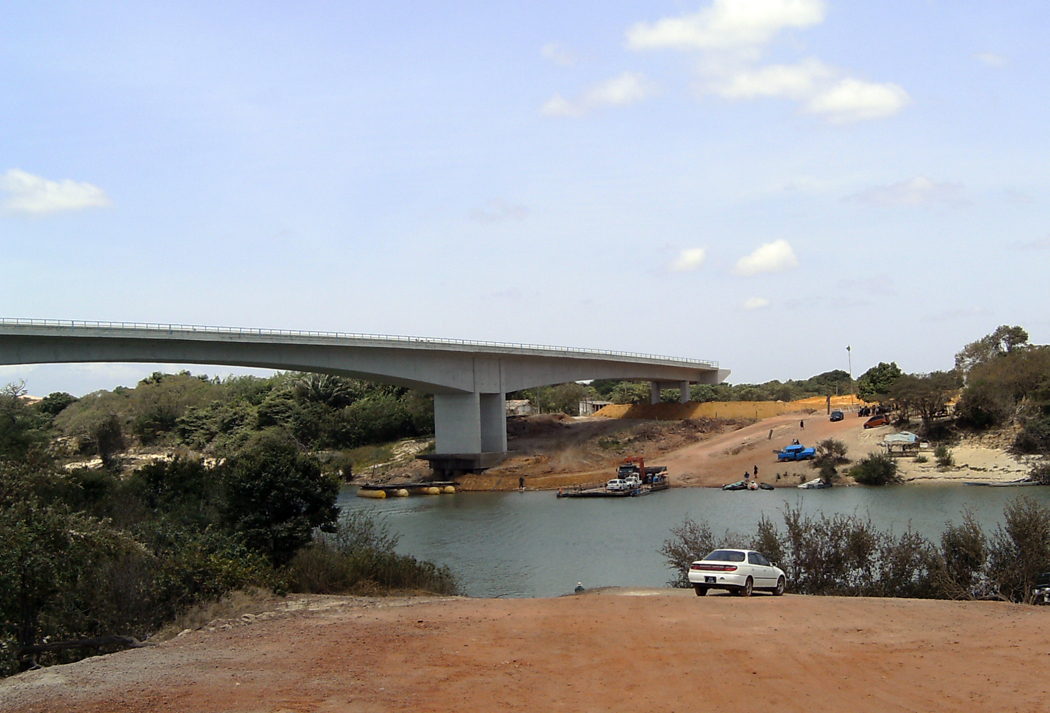
New Guyana - Brazil bridge in Lethem

The Guyanese and Brazilian governments opened the Takutu River Bridge in 2009 over the Takatu river just north of Lethem. It cost US$5 million and was paid for by Brazil. The bridge links northern Brazil to the roads leading to the Atlantic coastal port of Georgetown, Guyana's capital, which is about 423 kilometers (263 miles) to the north.

Water is often drawn from hand dug wells although there is a community water supply, though it is slightly salted. Bottled, filtered water is common and easily available in stores, even in 5-gallon containers.

The area's other economic activities are plant and mineral extraction, and tourism. There is a rodeo event during Easter weekend, beginning on Saturday evening, at the Triple R Ranch, with many activities, including bull riding, "wild cow milking", greased pig competition, horse racing, horse rodeo (both bareback and with saddle) for men or women, and for cowgirls, "barrel" horse races. Ample fresh food is generally available, such as chicken- or pork-on-a-stick, sun-back beef, hot dogs. There are also games, contests and entertainment, including a rope pull between vaqueros, and then vaqueras from Georgetown, competing with area Amerindians.

Conservation International maintains a local office in Lethem through its Guyana programme, Conservation International Guyana.

== Airport ==
Lethem has an airport (IATA Code: LTM) that connects it to the capital, Georgetown with scheduled air service most weekdays. The airport has a single, 6,194 foot (1,888 meter) paved runway with instrument markings, but no lighting. The runway is oriented at 07/25. The approach to 07 is often flown in Brazilian airspace which begins less than 1 km from the threshold. Scheduled service is provided by Trans Guyana Airways, twice a day, via a twin engine, as well as by Air Services LTD. Persons traveling by air to Lethem should know that there are strict weight restrictions for luggage. Weight, depending on booking, could be restricted to less than 20 pounds. At present, all luggage is weighed when flying to or from Lethem, and there is a small charge per kilo of weight. The airport office is located just south of the western end of the runway.

== Geography ==
Lethem lies on the eastern bank of the Takutu River, on the border with Brazil, just across the river from the Brazilian town of Bonfim, Roraima. Lethem is the capital of Region 9 and is a hub linking many of the surrounding villages to Georgetown.

The Takutu River Bridge over the Takutu River was completed in 2009 It cost US$5 million and was paid for by Brazil. and is the only road link between the two countries. The newly built bridge is expected to bring Brazilian goods to the Georgetown Harbour which would be faster than shipping through Brazilian ports.

The town is approximately 280 feet (85 m) above sea level.

== Demographics ==
According to the 2002 population census, it had 1,178 inhabitants.

Occupation of the population

Data	Officials	Professionals and technicians	Clergy	Commerce and Services	agricultural activities	industrial activities	Occup. elementals	S/D	Total
Population	50	70	32	151	14	56	66	294	1178

== Climate ==
Lethem has a tropical savanna climate (Aw) with moderate to little rainfall from September to April and heavy to very heavy rainfall from May to August.

Climate data for Lethem (1991–2020)
Month	Jan	Feb	Mar	Apr	May	Jun	Jul	Aug	Sep	Oct	Nov	Dec	Year
Record high °C (°F)	36.5 (97.7)	36.6 (97.9)	37.4 (99.3)	37.0 (98.6)	36.4 (97.5)	35.5 (95.9)	34.5 (94.1)	39.5 (103.1)	36.8 (98.2)	37.6 (99.7)	37.5 (99.5)	37.4 (99.3)	39.5 (103.1)
Mean daily maximum °C (°F)	32.8 (91.0)	33.0 (91.4)	33.6 (92.5)	33.1 (91.6)	31.6 (88.9)	31.5 (88.7)	31.3 (88.3)	32.3 (90.1)	33.8 (92.8)	34.5 (94.1)	34.3 (93.7)	33.1 (91.6)	32.9 (91.2)
Daily mean °C (°F)	28.3 (82.9)	28.4 (83.1)	28.8 (83.8)	28.7 (83.7)	27.7 (81.9)	27.5 (81.5)	27.3 (81.1)	28.0 (82.4)	29.1 (84.4)	29.7 (85.5)	29.6 (85.3)	28.7 (83.7)	28.5 (83.3)
Mean daily minimum °C (°F)	23.7 (74.7)	23.7 (74.7)	23.9 (75.0)	24.1 (75.4)	23.8 (74.8)	23.4 (74.1)	23.2 (73.8)	23.7 (74.7)	24.3 (75.7)	24.7 (76.5)	24.8 (76.6)	24.3 (75.7)	24.0 (75.2)
Record low °C (°F)	19.0 (66.2)	20.5 (68.9)	20.0 (68.0)	20.6 (69.1)	20.4 (68.7)	20.0 (68.0)	16.8 (62.2)	19.5 (67.1)	20.2 (68.4)	20.5 (68.9)	19.8 (67.6)	20.5 (68.9)	16.8 (62.2)
Average precipitation mm (inches)	16.2 (0.64)	25.4 (1.00)	43.9 (1.73)	108.5 (4.27)	310.4 (12.22)	305.4 (12.02)	292.7 (11.52)	171.6 (6.76)	98.3 (3.87)	68.3 (2.69)	51.7 (2.04)	39.7 (1.56)	1,532.1 (60.32)
Average precipitation days (≥ 1.0 mm)	3	3	3	8	17	18	19	13	8	4	3	5	104.9
Mean monthly sunshine hours	236.1	199.1	212.5	188.8	171.4	159.7	193.5	226.4	241.5	258.6	251.1	232.6	2,571.3
Source: NOAA

== Consular representation ==
Brazil has a Vice-consulate in Lethem.
