= Berbice Bridge =

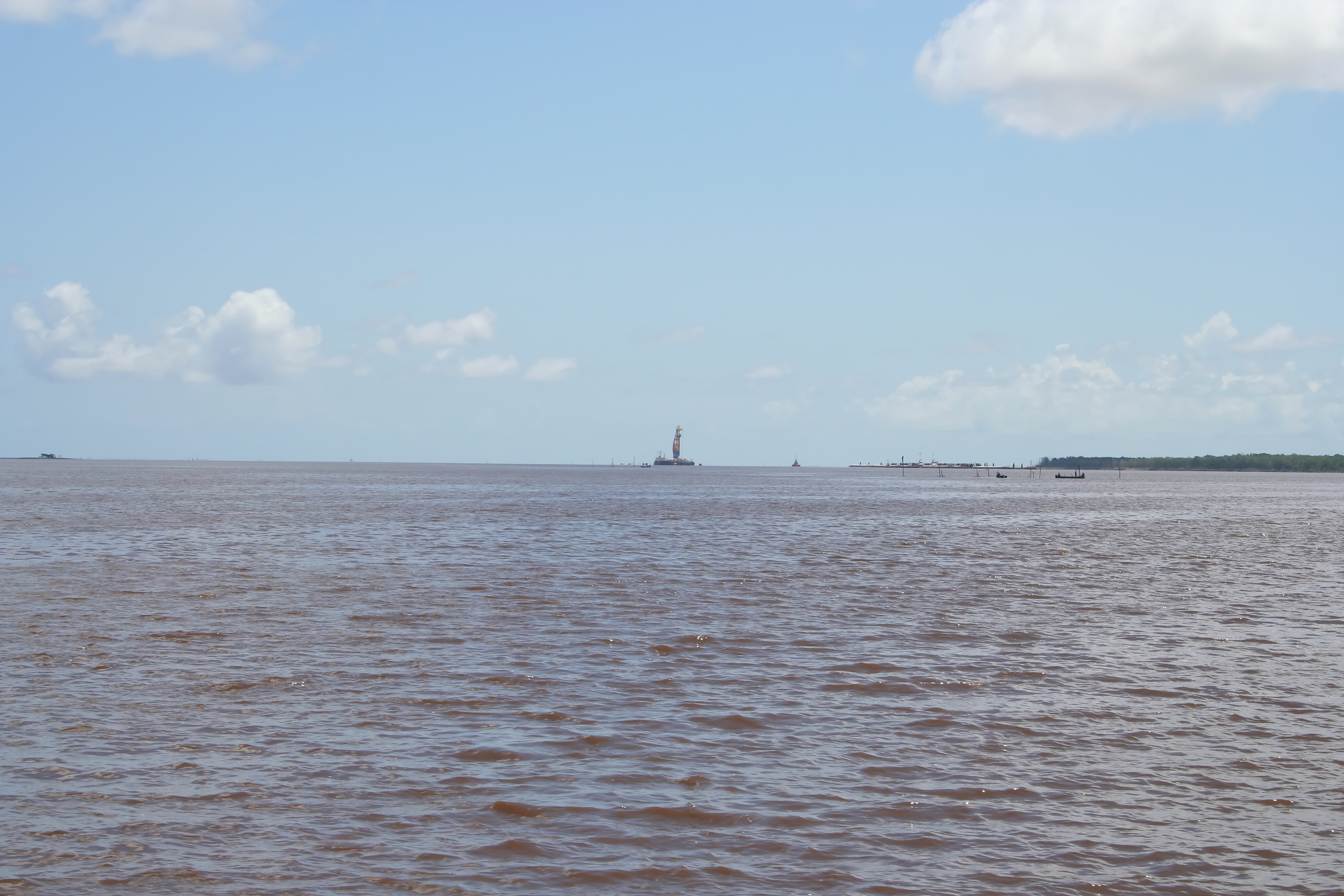
- The Berbice Bridge under construction in 2007
- Coordinates: 6°16′52″N 57°31′44″W
- Carries: 2-lane wide highway
- Crosses: Berbice River
- Locale: North east Berbice

Characteristics
- Total length: 1,571 m

History
- Opened: 23 December 2008

Statistics
- Toll: yes

The Berbice Bridge is a pontoon bridge over the Berbice River near New Amsterdam in Guyana. The bridge is tolled and was opened on 23 December 2008.

With the completion of the Berbice Bridge, and the earlier completion of the Coppename Bridge in Suriname in 1999, the Courantyne River is the only river between the Guyanese capital of Georgetown and the Surinamese capital of Paramaribo still left without a bridge. This is may change in the future, with plans for a bridge on the Courantyne near South Drain. The bridge doesn't have a pedestrian crossing.

It is owned by Berbice Bridge Company Incorporated and tolls are set by a Concession Agreement between the government and the company. In 2018, the government took over ownership of the bridge as a reaction to the 360% increase in toll, citing Sections 4 (1) and 11 of the Berbice River Bridge Act in the interest of public safety.

== See also ==
- List of bridges in Guyana
