= Potaro River =

River in Guyana

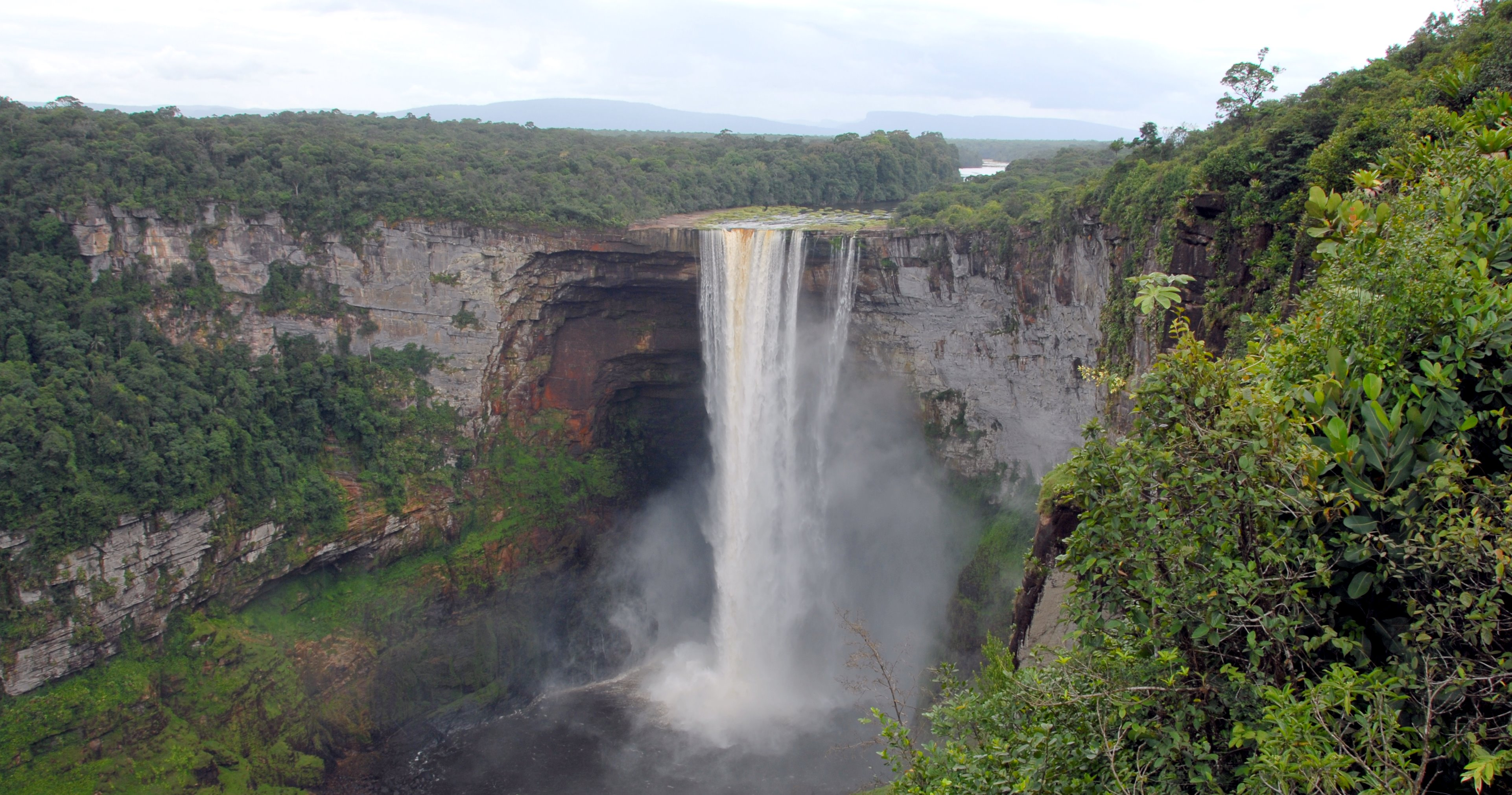
- Kaieteur Falls in Potaro River.

Location
- Country: Guyana
- Province: Potaro-Siparuni

Physical characteristics
- Source
  - location: Mount Ayanganna (Pakaraima Mountains)
  - coordinates: 5°18′54.5292″N 59°59′19.7808″W
  - elevation: 2,040 m (6,690 ft)
- Mouth: Essequibo River
  - coordinates: 5°22′7.356″N 58°53′49.884″W
  - elevation: 15 m (49 ft)
- Length: 255 km (158 mi)
- Basin size: 6,842.4 km^{2} (2,641.9 sq mi)
- Discharge
  - location: Near mouth
  - average: 521 m^{3}/s (18,400 cu ft/s) (Average flow during the dry and wet periods is 430 m^{3}/s (15,000 cu ft/s) and 790 m^{3}/s (28,000 cu ft/s)
  - minimum: 44 m^{3}/s (1,600 cu ft/s)
  - maximum: 2,223 m^{3}/s (78,500 cu ft/s)
- Discharge
  - location: Tumatumari Falls (Basin size: 6,778.9 km^{2} (2,617.3 sq mi)
  - average: 510 m^{3}/s (18,000 cu ft/s)
- Discharge
  - location: Kaieteur Falls (Basin size: 3,451.5 km^{2} (1,332.6 sq mi)
  - average: 238 m^{3}/s (8,400 cu ft/s) (average flow wet period: 663 m^{3}/s (23,400 cu ft/s)

Basin features
- Progression: Essequibo → Atlantic Ocean
- Tributaries
  - left: Mure-Mure, Uewang, Kuribrong
  - right: Kopinang, Kawaik, Arnik, Amakwa, Ekureparu, Maniparu

The Potaro River is a river in Guyana that runs from Mount Ayanganna area of the Pakaraima Mountains for approximately 255 km (158 mi) before flowing into the Essequibo River, Guyana's largest river. The renowned Kaieteur Falls is on the Potaro.

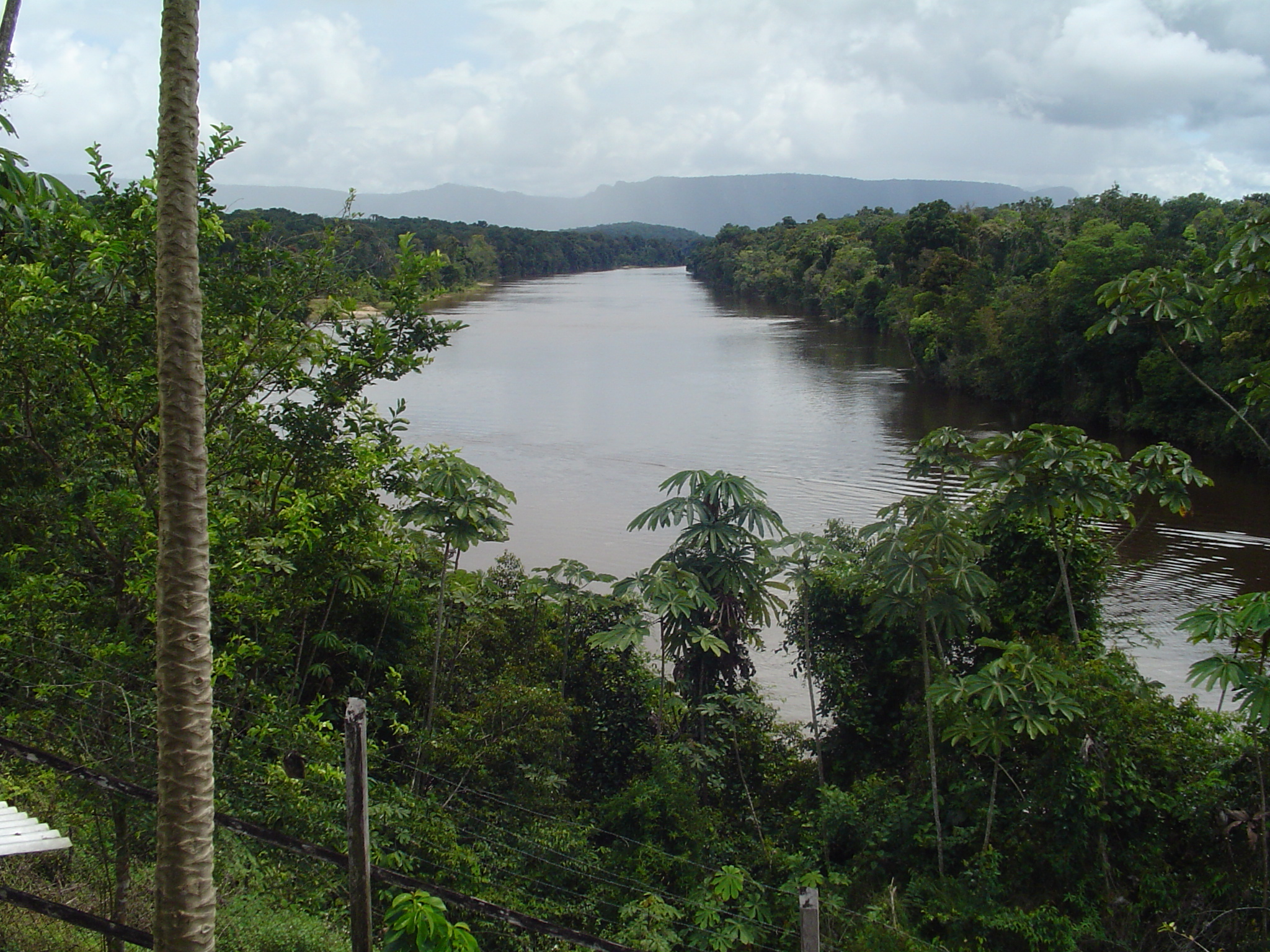
View of Potaro River at Pamela Landing

== Features ==
Nine waterfalls are found on the Potaro River, most notable being Kaieteur Falls and Tumatumari Falls. Below Kaieteur Falls lie Amatuk Falls and Waratuk Falls.

A 1930 Suspension bridge, the Garraway Stream Bridge crosses the river. As well, 'Two Islands' is found on the Potaro River.

== Minerals ==
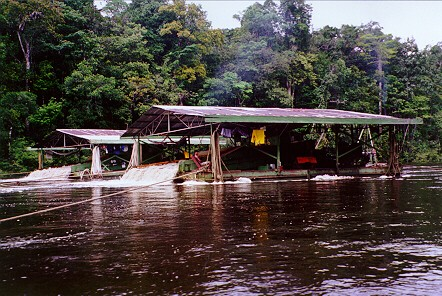
A gold dredger (known locally as a "missile") on the Potaro River

Placer gold and diamonds are extracted from the river in this mineral-rich area. Many thousands of ounces of placer gold have been recovered from the area's stream gravels, residual placers and saprolites.

The two largest gem-quality diamonds recovered in Guyana to date – 56.75 carats (11.35 g) from Little Uewang River and 25.67 carats (5.134 g) from Maple Creek – were recovered in the Potaro area.

Illegal dredging is used in mining, and is hard to monitor due to Potato River's isolation.

The mineral potarite is named for the river where it was first discovered by Sir John Burchmore Harrison.

== Settlements ==
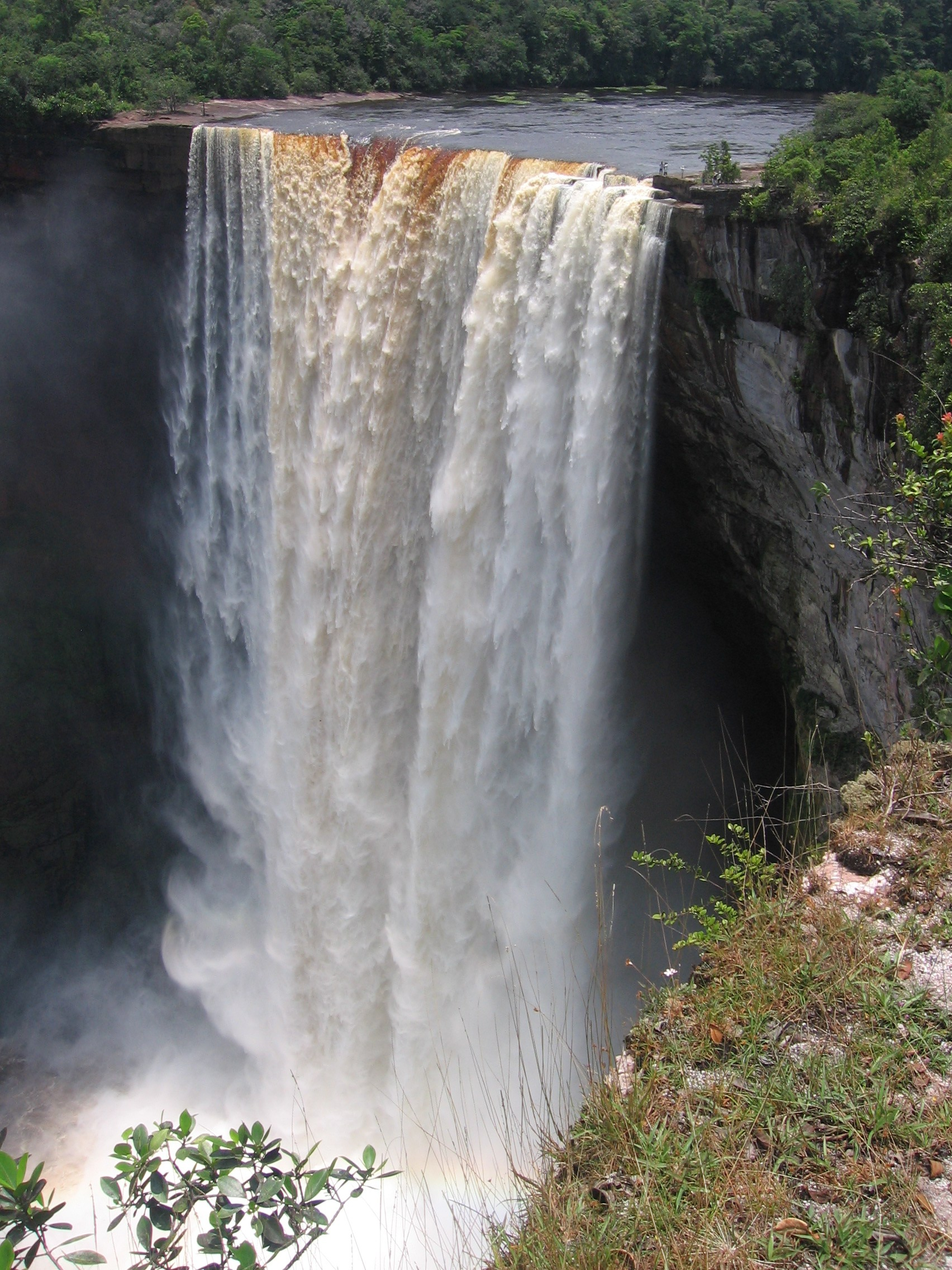
Kaieteur Falls September 2007

Villages along the Potaro include Micobie, Tumatumari, Chenapau (south of Kaieteur Falls), and Menzies Landing, a 20-minute walk upriver from Kaieteur Falls, is the main staging area for up river travel. Up river from the falls, the Potaro Plateau stretches out to the distant escarpment of the Pakaraima Mountains.

=== Potaro Landing ===
The Potaro River is navigable up to Potaro Landing. Further upstream, rapids and waterfalls make travel by boat impossible. In 1933, the Denham Suspension Bridge opened near Potaro Landing to shorten the access to the gold fields of the interior. There was a daily steamer service from Tumatumari Landing to Potaro Landing to transport passenger and freight to the interior.

The population of Potaro Landing and surrounding area was 112 people in 2012. Potaro Landing is located at 5.3565°N 59.1185°W

== See also ==
- Amaila Falls
- Kamarang Great Falls
- King George VI Falls
