= Giant Steps (art-project) =

International art project devoted to culture and environment

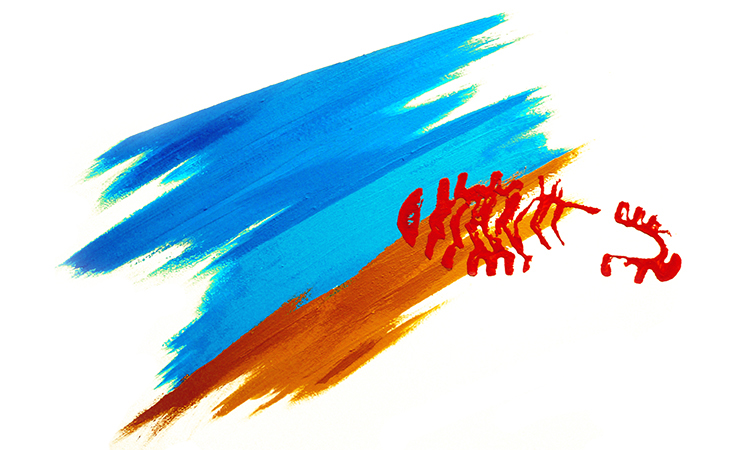
- Location: Lausanne, Switzerland
- Established: 2015; 11 years ago (first project implemented)

Other information
- Director: Viliam Mauritz
- Website: Giant Steps Home Page

Giant Steps is a non-profit art project that consists of a large-scale installation in the shape of a giant footprint and a cultural festival. The project carried out 5 installations in 4 different countries: Australia, Hungary, Brazil and Russia, focusing on the topics of local culture and environment. The author of the project is a Swiss-Hungarian painter and sculptor Viliam Mauritz.

== Concept ==
The project uses the image of a footprint, a strong and universally recognizable symbol, to encourage the viewer to reflect on the imprint of our everyday actions. The project is designed to "walk the world" shedding light on the cultural and ecological environment of local communities. The footprint represents the imprint our actions leave on the planet and the minds of the people. As the participants walk through the hundred-meter-long installation, they don't see the shape it takes, which highlights how we have to distance ourselves to see the imprint of our actions.

The installation is always constructed out of natural materials native to the area of the event.

== Projects ==
=== 1st Step. Australia (Brisbane). 2015. ===
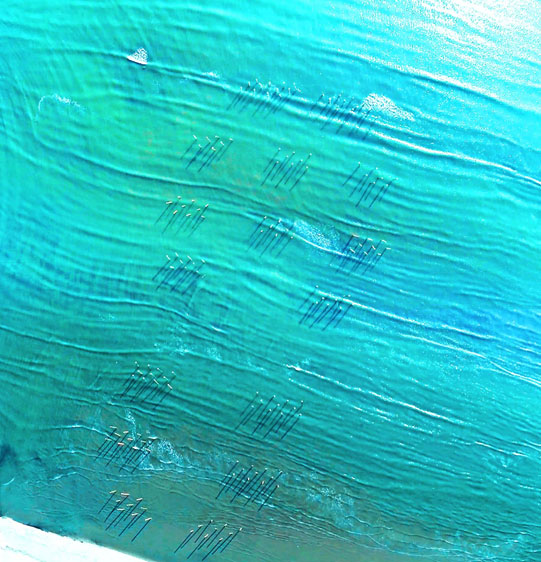
Aerial view of the installation at high tide.

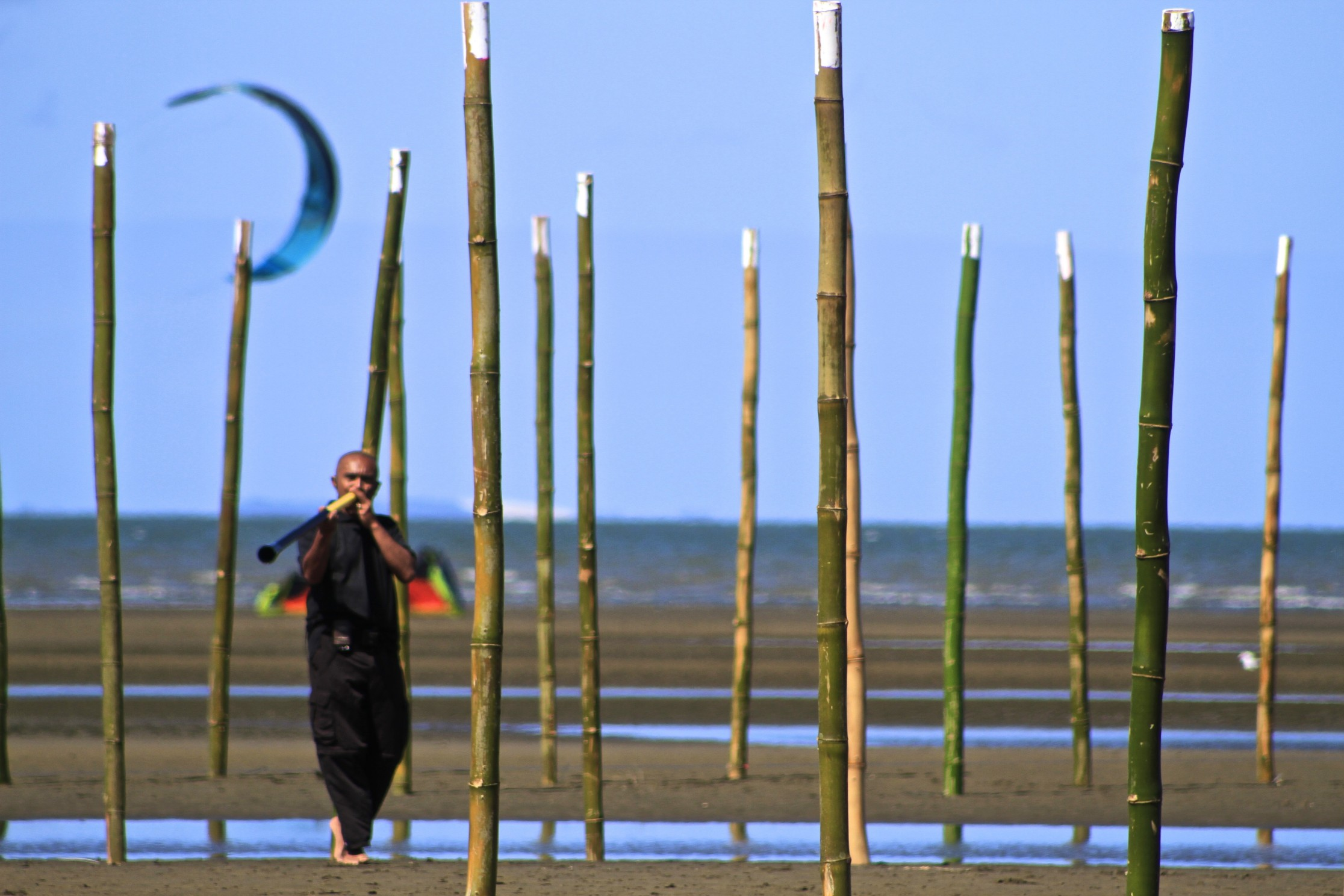
Didgeridoo performance at the Giant Steps installation in Australia.

In 2015, Viliam Mauritz opened a crowdfunding campaign on Indiegogo to implement the first Giant Step. The campaign gained 1 151 euros. Eventually, the project was implemented with the support of Music by the Sea, Elysium Theatre, Jared Cassidy from the Australian Council of Labour and many local volunteers. Loretta Henry, the creative director and writer of Elysium Theatre, acted as the project manager in Australia and the project took place on October 10–11, 2015 on Sandgate Beach in Brisbane, Australia.

The installation was created out of 152 local untreated bamboo poles placed on the shore at low tide. Native Australian musician Tjupurru was playing the didgeridoo while walking through the installation. The public was able to walk between the bamboo poles, without having any concept of the form taking shape.

=== 2nd Step. Hungary (Kaposmérő). 2017. ===
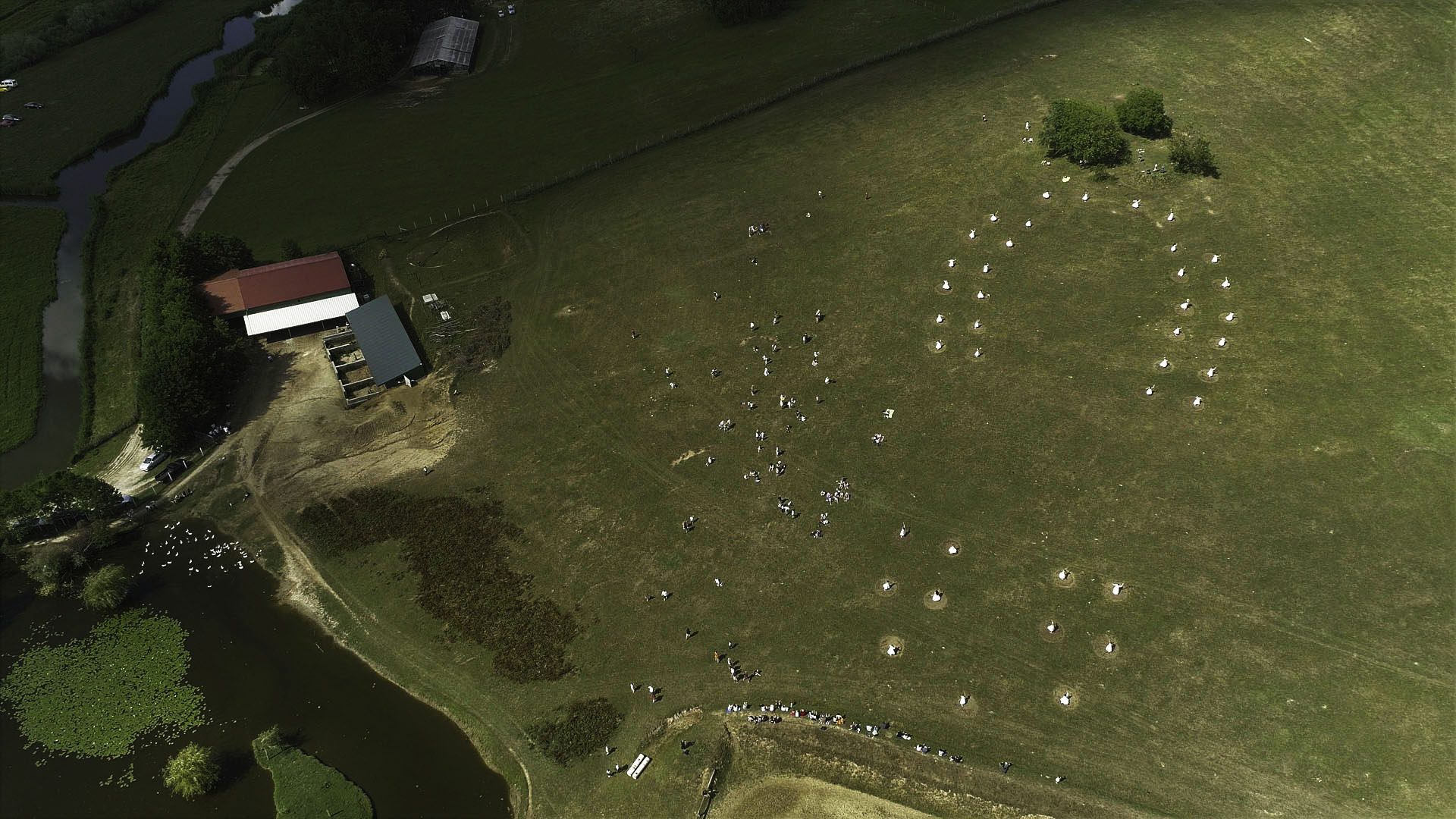
Giant Steps installation in Kaposmérő, Hungary.

The second "Step" was implemented in June 2017 in Kassai Valley – Kaposmérő, Hungary, where an ancient Hungarian tradition of horseback archery has left a deep imprint in the local culture. The installation took place on the property of Lajos Kassai, a multiple world champion in horseback archery. The project was managed by Tibor Szombathelyi, a Hungarian rural lifestyle guru, and supported by previous organizers as well as local volunteers.

The installation consisted of 39 circles mowed on the field and a woman in a white dress spinning in each circle. This installation was accompanied by traditional Hungarian music and dance, a craft fair and horseback archery exercises led by master Lajos Kassai. Hundreds of people camped in the valley to visit the Giant Steps event.

=== 3rd Step. Brazil (Raposa Serra do Sol). 2017. ===
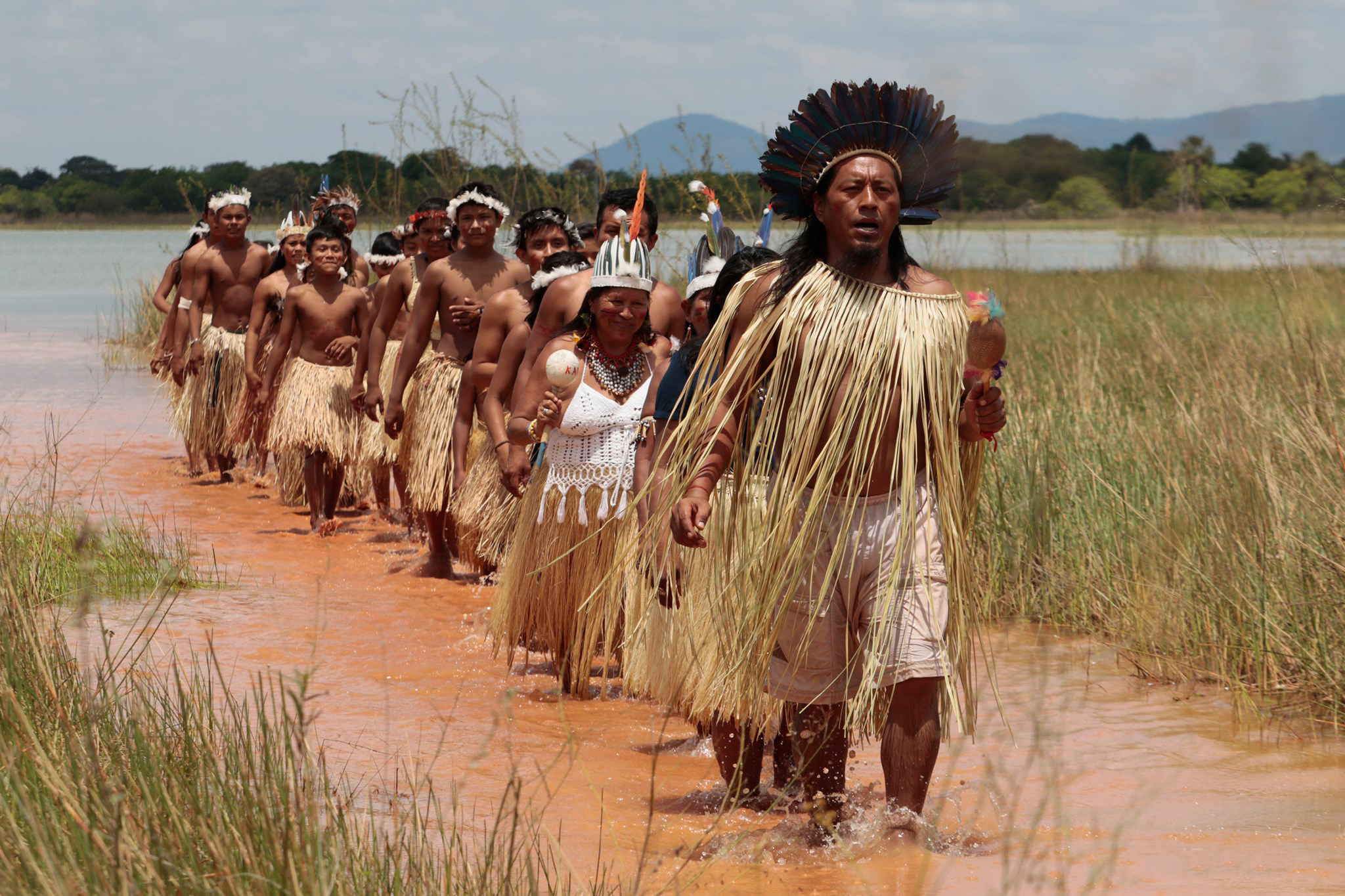
Jiader Esbell performing a Macuxi ritual.

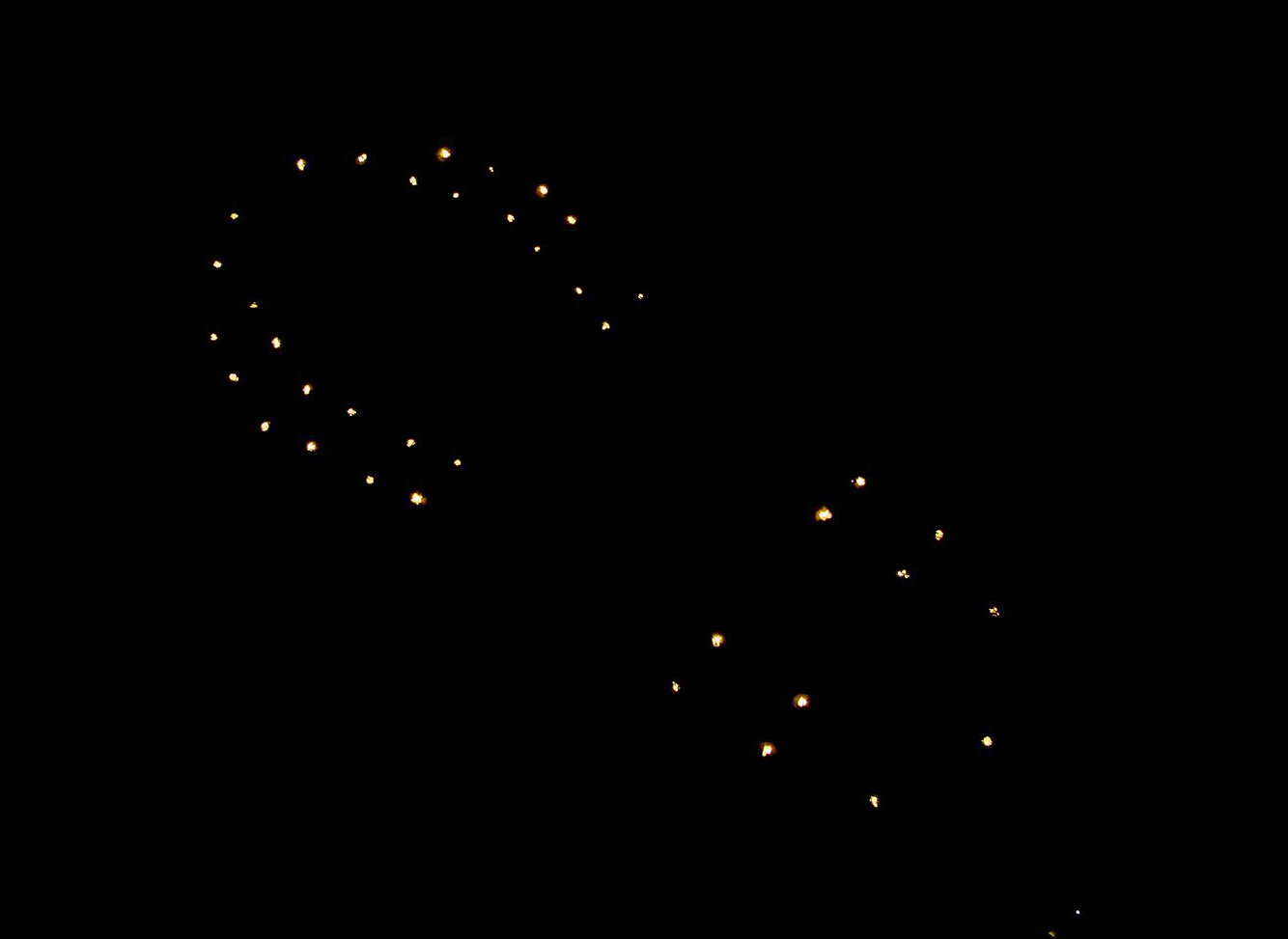
Giant Steps installation made of Macuxi bonfires.

In 2017, an indigenous Brazilian artist and activist Jaider Esbell contacted Viliam Mauritz inviting him to bring the Giant Steps project to his community of Raposa in Brazil to show the imprint of the indigenous Macuxi people's battle for their culture's survival. The Macuxi community found a deep spiritual connection with the project since it correlated with their mythology.

«In their mythology, a giant named Makunaima is the one who will free them. My project depicts a huge footprint as if left by a giant... That's why they accepted me and were convinced that I came to help them. I explained that I couldn't do it, but I would be happy to get the world to know about them.»

— Viliam Mauritz, in an interview with Život (Slovakia)

Jaider Esbell took the position of the project manager in Amazonia, Brazil, and together with Music By The Sea, Elysium Theatre and the anthropologist and translator Nina Vincent, they implemented the project in Raposa Serra do Sol, Roraima, the native land of the Macuxi people.

The "footprint" was made of 39 Macuxi bonfires and was accompanied by Macuxi rituals, dances, clay drawing and horse riding.

=== 4th Step. Russia (Ovstug). 2019. ===
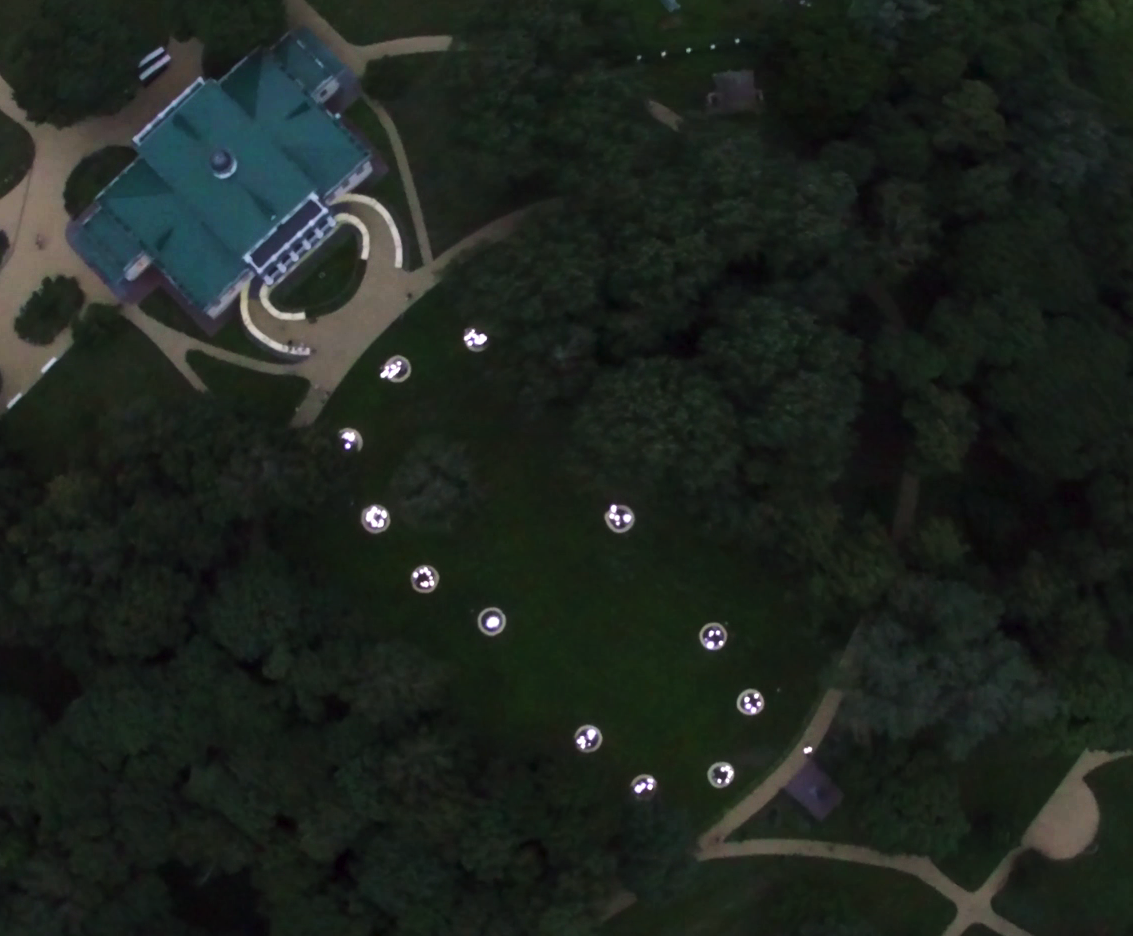
Giant Steps installation in front of Tyutchev's manor in Ovstug.

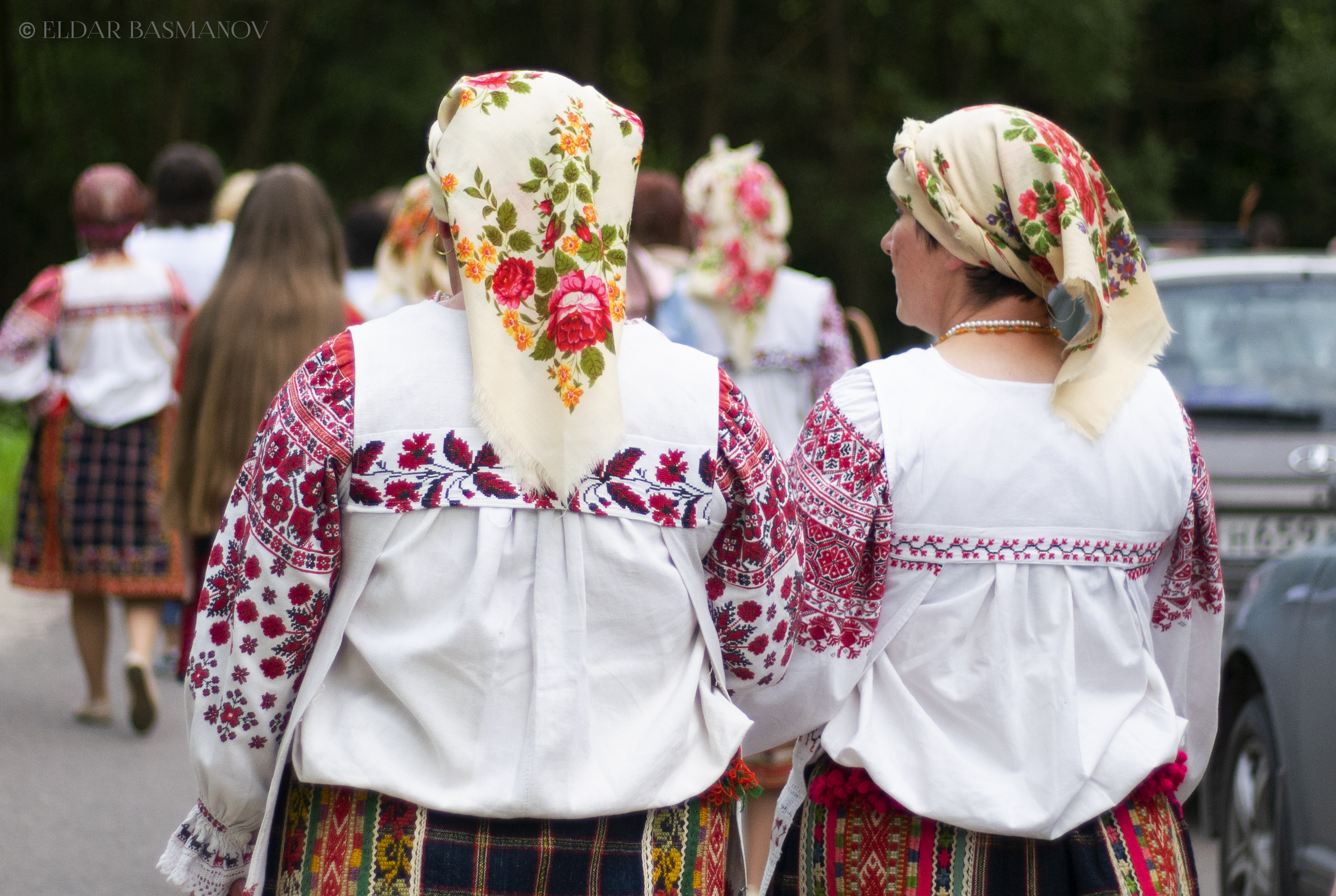
Women in traditional Russian clothing at the Giant Steps festival in Ovstug.

The 4th Step was dedicated to a famous XIX-century Russian poet Fyodor Tyutchev and his imprint on world culture. The project was implemented in collaboration with the State Memorial Museum of F. Tyutchev in Ovstug, Bryansk region. The former professor of Bryansk State University, Elena Burdina, took the position of project manager.

The project in Ovstug turned into a multicultural festival as the managers of the previous Steps, Loretta Henry (Elysium Theatre) and Zoli Mauritz (Music By the Sea) from Australia and Jaider Esbell from Brazil, took part in the festival.

The festival featured poetical and musical performances, calligraphy and ballroom dancing workshops, crafting workshops, traditional Russian games, lectures, art exhibitions and guided tours in Tyutchev museum. One of the most famous Tyutchev's poems, “Silentium”, was read in 5 languages of the project (French, English, Hungarian, Portuguese and Russian).

The installation consisted of 14 circles formed with the glowing sawdust on the field in front of Tyutchev's manor house and a volunteer in each circle reading Tyutchev's poems.

== Projects in development ==
=== Brazil (Caatinga) ===
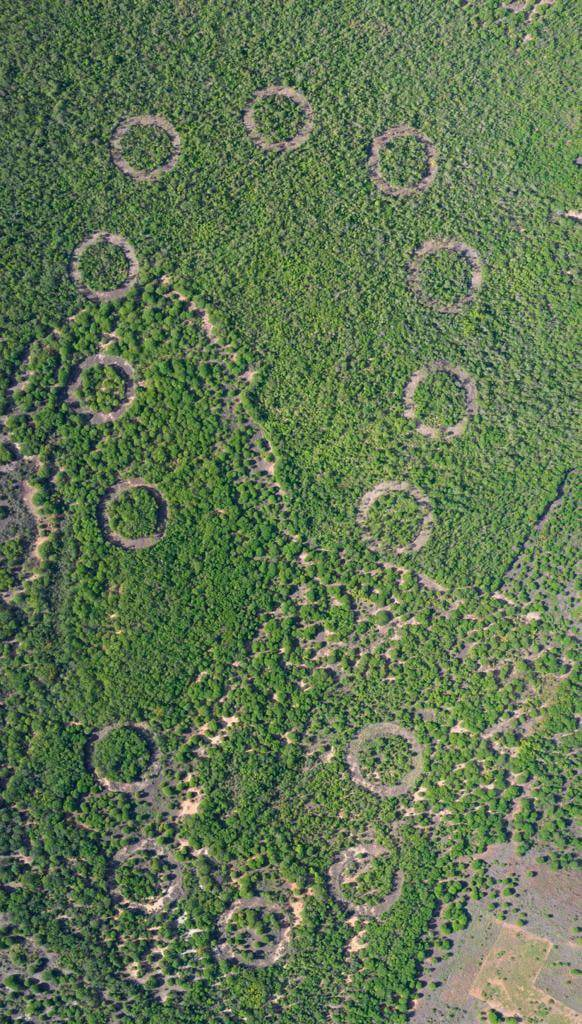
The 14 circles of the installation will be filled with plants, shrubs and trees.

During the Giant Steps project in Raposa in 2017, a Brazilian journalist Alvaro Severo approached Viliam Mauritz with a proposal to bring Giant Steps to his home region, Caatinga, a unique biome which is turning into a desert due to deforestation. He proposed to make a several kilometre-long footprint, which the local community can later populate with plants, shrubs and trees with the goal to create an agroforest in Caatinga.

In 2020, Viliam Mauritz opened a crowdfunding campaign on Indiegogo to fund the 5th Step in Caatinga.

By November 2022, Alvaro's team finished the 14 circles that make up the giant footprint. Alvaro is currently working in cooperation with researchers from Federal Rural University of Pernambuco to populate the circles with vegetation.

=== Russia (Pleistocene Park, Siberia) ===
In 2020, Viliam Mauritz started working with Nikita and Sergey Zimov, the director of Pleistocene Park in Siberia, Russia, to carry out the installation dedicated to the “gigantic footprint” the Pleistocene Park is leaving with their effort to preserve permafrost and stop global warming.

The installation in Pleistocene Park is being planned as a part of a bigger initiative called "The Arctic Circle Walk" which would involve the creation of a Giant Steps installation in every country of the arctic circle, which would point attention to the problem of melting permafrost in Siberia, Alaska, Canada, Greenland, Iceland, Norway, Sweden and Finland.
