= Francisco da Silva =

Francisco da Silva is the name of:

- Francisco da Silva (politician) (1957–2010), president of the National Assembly of São Tomé and Príncipe
- Francisco da Silva (fencer) (born 1945), Portuguese Olympic fencer
- Chico da Silva (1910–1985) Brazilian painter
