= Giant Steps (disambiguation) =

Giant Steps is a 1960 album by jazz musician John Coltrane.

Giant Steps may also refer to:

== Music ==
- Giant Steps (band), dance pop duo from England that consisted of vocalist Colin Campsie and bassist/keyboardist George McFarlane
- Giant Steps (The Boo Radleys album), 1993
- Giant Steps (Tommy Flanagan album)
- Giant Steps, a compilation album by Gentle Giant
- "Giant Steps" (composition), the first track on the album of the same name by John Coltrane

== Other ==
- Giant Steps (book), autobiography of Kareem Abdul-Jabbar, which he co-authored with Peter Knobler
- Giant Steps (art-project), international art project devoted to culture and environment

== See also ==
- Mother May I?, a children's game
