= Alister Charlie =

Guyanese politician

Alister Charlie MP

Member of the Parliament of Guyana for Region 9 - Upper Takutu-Upper Essequibo
- Incumbent
- Assumed office 2015

Personal details
- Born: 1977 or 1978 (age 47–48)
- Party: People's Progressive Party/Civic

Alister Charlie is a Guyanese politician. He is a member of the National Assembly. He is of indigenous descent, specifically of the Wapishana and Macushi.

== Controversies ==
In January 2020, he was charged with perversion of the course of justice and for sexual assault.
