= Lajos Kassai =

Hungarian bowyer, archer and equestrian

Lajos Kassai (born 16 September 1960) is a Hungarian bowyer, archer and equestrian. He is primarily known for his work reviving the traditional art of mounted archery, including adapting it into a modern sport. For his work he received the Officer's Cross of the Order of Merit of the Republic of Hungary.

== Bow-making ==
Lajos Kassai started making his bows in the mid-1980s and was competing successfully in field archery. Then based on the work of Karoly Cs. Sebestyen and Dr Gyula Fabian, using modern materials and technologies, he reconstructed and as first one in the world started series production of the traditional Hungarian bow used in the age of the Hungarian Conquest. Eventually bow-making became his primary profession, and he became the first in the world to mass-produce this style of bow. Besides Hungarian, Kassai makes other types of traditional bows, including; Scythian, Hun (asymmetric type), Avar, and Mongol.

== Equestrian archery ==
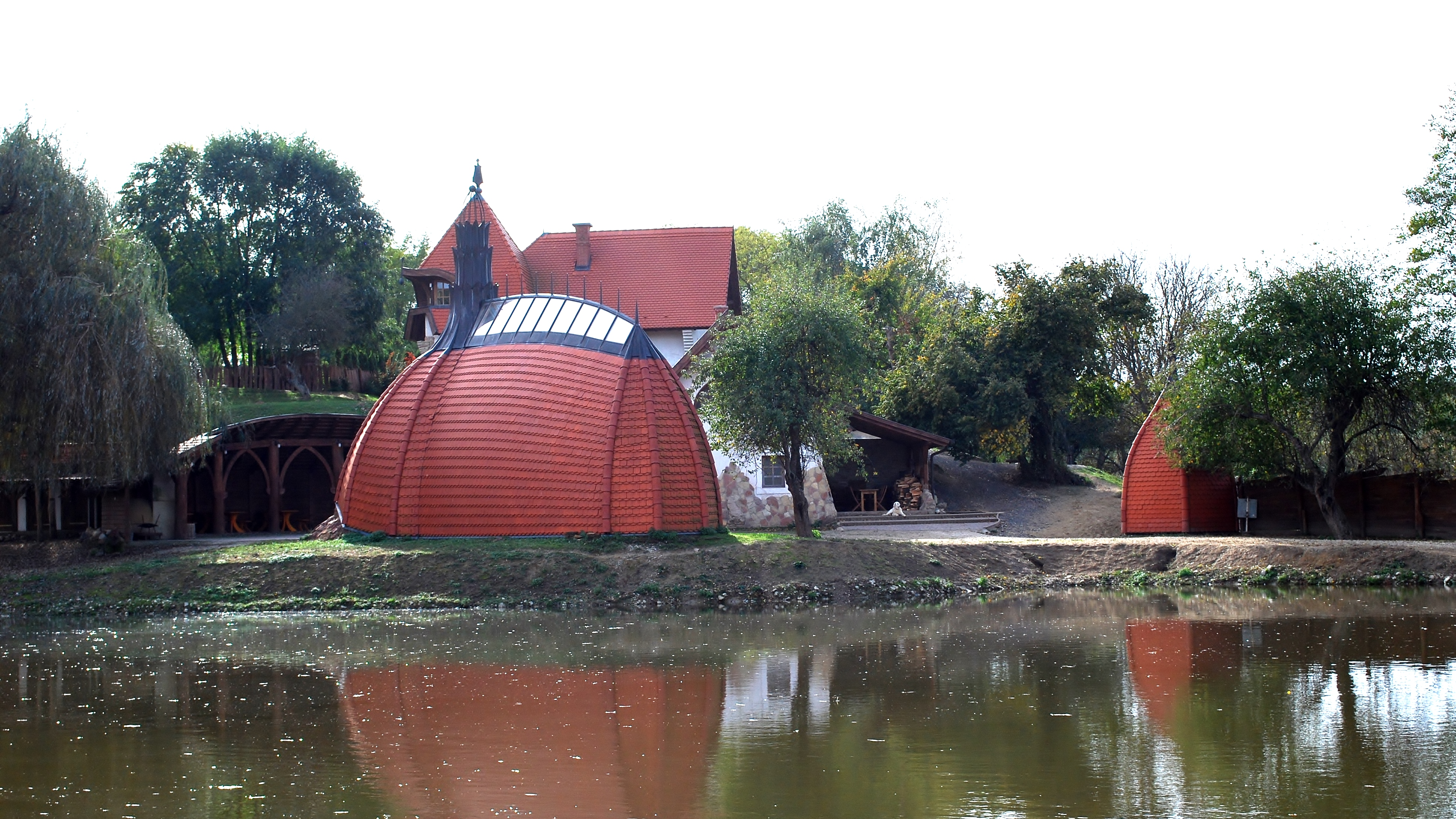
Kassai-völgy.

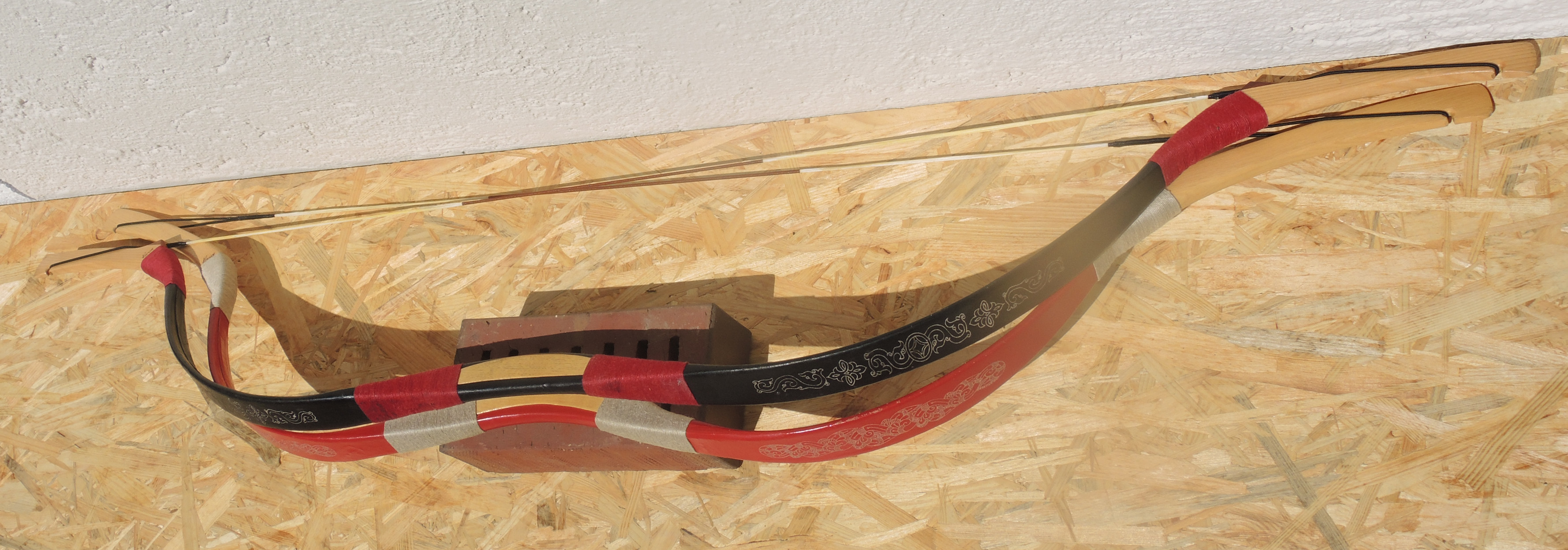
Ölyv (red) and Farkas II. (black) bows

We are not to follow our ancestors, we are to follow what they were following.

— Lajos Kassai,

Kassai created the competitive rule system of horse archery in the late 1980s, and started to propagate this new sport, first in Hungary, and from the 1990s in the rest of Europe, the United States and Canada. He made himself familiar with kyūdō in Kamakura, Japan, and travelled to Shaolin in China to study.

He summarized his experiences in his book Lovasíjászat ('Horse Archery'), which since its issue has been translated into German, English and Russian.

He founded the center of Hungarian horse archery, Kassai-völgy, near Kaposmérő. Horse archery centers based on the Kassai school are currently operating in fourteen countries, and organize world cups regularly.

In 2011, the University of Physical Education accepted the education practice developed by Kassai and began horse archery training. Hungary is the first country in the world where one can get a teaching diploma in horse archery.

His life and work was dramatized by Géza Kaszás in the film A lovasíjász ('The horse archer'), which premiered in January 2016.

== Achievements ==
Lajos Kassai won all competitions he entered from 1994 to 2019, among them countless World Cup rounds and international equestrian archery competitions, and the Equestrian Archery Open World Championship in 2014.

== Guinness World Records of Lajos Kassai ==
He set five Guinness World Records:

2011: In December, he shot 14 discs under 19.85 seconds in front of an 8,000 member audience and set his fifth Guinness World Record at the Budapest Sport Arena.

2009: In December, he set his fourth record in the Budapest Sports Arena. He shot 12 pieces of 30 cm diameter flying discs (thrown by his students) from the back of a galloping horse in 17.80 seconds.

2006: Riding 12 horses, Kassai Lajos did equestrian archery continuously for 24 hours during 661 competition runs, he achieved a total score of 15,596.43 points with 5,412 shots. His average point per standard competition (9 runs) was 212.35 points.

2002: Riding 12 horses, during 12 hours of continuous equestrian archery, he managed to achieve a total score of 7,126.05 with nearly 3,000 shots in 323 competition runs, breaking his previous record. His average point per standard competition was 198.55 points.

1998: Riding 12 horses, shot more than 1,000 targeted shots in 286 competition runs during 12 hours of continuous equestrian archery. His average point per standard competition was 133 points.

== Awards, merits ==
- Teleki Pál merit (2021)
- World Ethnosport Confederation – Special award (2020)
- University of Veterinary Medicine, Budapest – Riding instructor honorary award (2018)
- Granite Lion Award – Finalist in the public role model category (2017)
- "For the Hungarian nation" – Silver medal (2017)
- From the Hungarian Equestrian Association – Count István Széchenyi Equestrian Commemorative Medal (2017)
- Pongrátz Gergely cross of merit (2017)
- Middle Cross of the Order of Merit of Hungary (2016)
- Pro Comitatu Somogy award (2016)
- "For the Hungarians of the World" public award (2014)
- The Original Kassai System equestrian archery method was included in the (Hungarikum) Collection of Hungarian Values (2013)
- Golden Arrowhead Award (2013)
- Szent István University, Gödöllő – Riding instructor honorary award and Silver Laurel Wreath Award (2013)
- Bárdudvarnok – Honorary citizen (2013)
- Hungarian Heritage Award (2012)
- The Original Kassai System equestrian archery method was included in Intangible Cultural Heritage in Hungary (2012)
- Knight of the Hungarian Culture (2012)
- Equestrian Archery was included into the university education first time in the world in Hungary, Budapest (2011)
- Person of the year – Somogy County (2010)
- The Kassai Equestrian Archery School won the (Kaposvár Városért díj) – Award for the city of Kaposvár (2009)
- Árpád Shield Award (2008)
- Our Heritage – Somogy County's treasure award (2008)
- Kaposmérő – Honorary citizen
- Officer's Cross of the Order of Merit of the Republic of Hungary (2003)

== Travels to foreign countries ==
2020. Turkey: Antalya – 2. International Traditional Sport Award

2020. Qatar: Doha – training camp

2020. South Africa: Pretoria – training camp and track initiation

2019. Romania: Miercurea Ciuc – track initiation

2019. France: Charron La Rochelle – track initiation

2019. Russia: Volgograd – training camp and track initiation

2019. China: Wuhan – training camp and track initiation

2018. Canada: Nova Scotia – training camp and track initiation

2018. USA: Hamilton, MT – training camp and track initiation

2018. Luxemburg: Limpach – training camp and track initiation

2017. USA: Arlington, WA – training camp and track initiation

2017. Canada: Ottawa – training camp

2017. USA: Solvang, California – training camp at Monty Roberts' farm (Flag is up)

2015. Malaysia: Penang, Turf Club, International Festival with Horses – training camp and presentation

2015. (November) Qatar: Doha – training camp

2015. (August) Qatar: Doha – training camp

2015. China: Peking – CCTV, Impossible Challenge China – presentation

2015. China: Peking, Tsingtao – training camp

2015. Germany: Köln, Baasem – track initiation

2015. France: Maulde – track initiation

2014. China: Guangzhou, Shenzhen, Peking – training camp

2014: Qatar: Doha – training camp and presentation

2014. China: Chinghai, Tsingtao, Tongwancheng, Inner Mongolia – training camp

2013. China: Hsian, Hohhot, Xilinhot, Wuhan – presentation

2013. China: Peking – presentation

2013. France: Avignon, (Cheval Passion 2013) – presentation

2012. Turkey: Denizli – presentation

2012. China: Peking, Ordosz – presentation

2012. China: Peking, Csengtu, Sanghaj, Hangcsou, Sencsen – presentation

2012. Switzerland: Zürich (Mercedes SCI Cup) – presentation

2011. France: Paris (International Agricultural Exhibition) – presentation

2010. France: Saint Sébastien sur Loire – presentation

2009. Spain: Seville (Sicab) – presentation

2007. Austria: Mariensee – presentation

2006. Greece: Athens (European Archery Championship, 2006) – presentation

2006. Germany: Berlin – training camp and presentation

2002. USA: Fort Dodge, Iowa – presentation

2000. USA: Fort Dodge, Iowa – presentation

1999: China: Shaolin – study trip

1999. Ausztria: Bécs (Wiener Stadthalle) – presentation

1996. USA: Pennsylvania – training camp and presentation

1996. Japan: Kamakura – study trip

1992. Netherlands: Amsterdam – presentation

1992. Italy: Forli – presentation

Presentations - Attended by royal families of the countries:

- 2019. England: London (Royal Windsor Horse Show)
- 2015. Malaysia: Pinang
- 2014. Malaysia: Kuala Lumpur
- 2012. Jordan : Al Faris
- 2009. Morocco: El Jadida

== Family ==
Kassai is married and has three daughters. His wife is Vanda Kassainé Olter.

== See also ==
- Kassai Lajos életrajz (magyar nyelven). lovasíjászat.hu. (Accessed: 2016-01-23)
- A magyar harcművészet reklámfilmje – A lovasíjász filtekercs.hu, 2016-01-20.
- Kassai Lajos: Nincs lovasíjászgénünk, Origo.hu, 2017-03-10.
