= Chico da Silva =

Brazilian painter (c. 1910–1985)

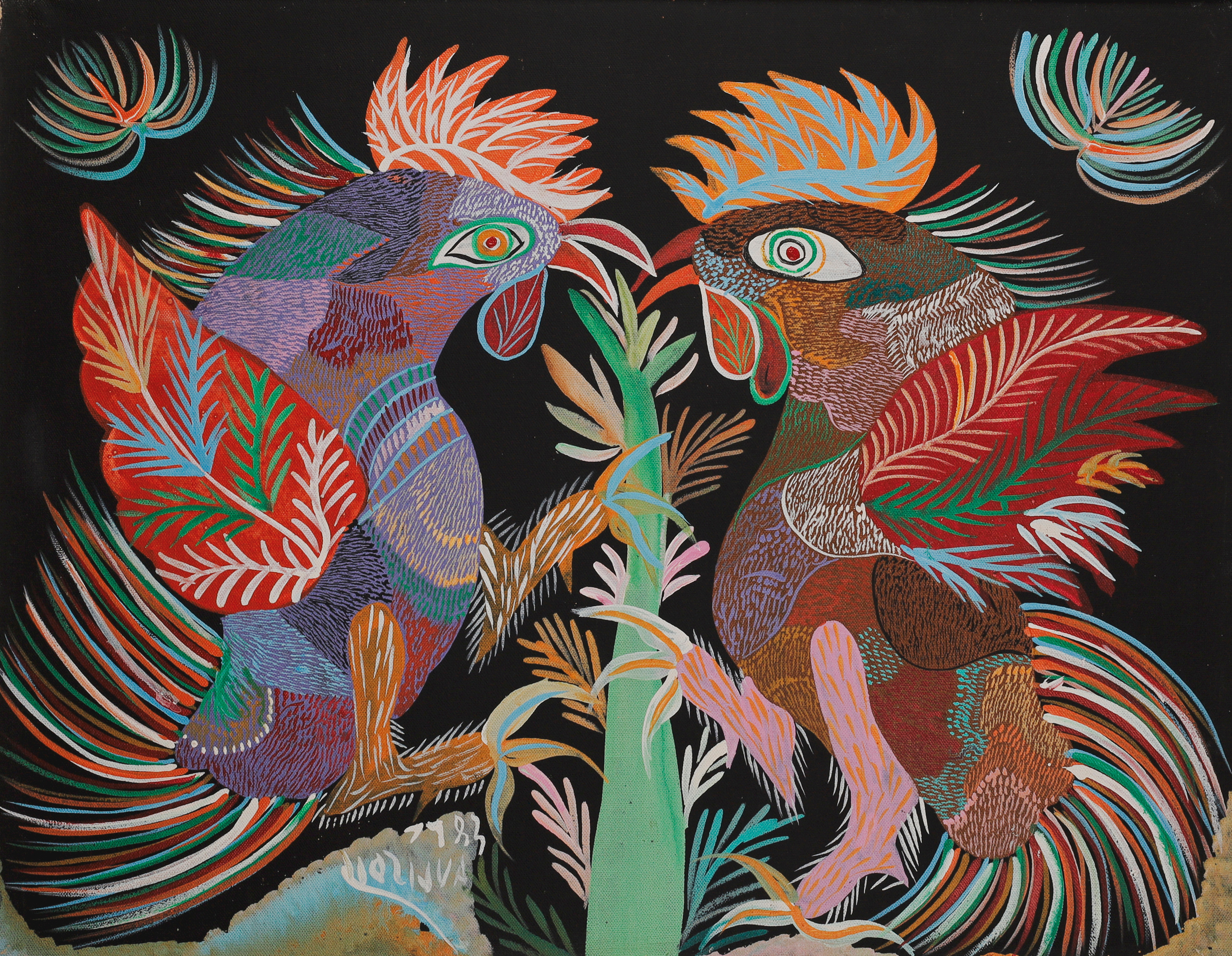
- Galos de Briga (Cockfight), 1983, acrylic on canvas, 50 × 70 cm. João Cunha Collection
- Born: Francisco Domingos da Silva c. 1910; Alto Tejo, Acre, Brazil
- Died: 6 December 1985; Fortaleza, Ceará, Brazil
- Resting place: Parque da Paz cemetery, Fortaleza
- Known for: Painting
- Notable work: Homens Trabalhando (1977)
- Movement: Naïve art
- Awards: Honourable mention, 33rd Venice Biennale (1966); Anchieta Medal (1978); Medalha da Abolição (1984)

Francisco Domingos da Silva (c. 1910 – 6 December 1985), known as Chico da Silva, was a Brazilian painter. Illiterate all his life, he began around 1937 by drawing with charcoal, chalk and pieces of brick on the whitewashed walls of the shacks at Praia Formosa, in Fortaleza, and signed his pictures "F. D. Silva", with a thumbprint beside the name.

In 1943 the Swiss painter Jean-Pierre Chabloz, who was in Fortaleza working for the wartime rubber campaign, saw the walls and went looking for whoever had painted them. He gave him gouache, paper and brushes, bought what he produced and took the work to Europe, where in December 1952 he published the article "Un indien brésilien ré-invente la peinture" in the Paris journal Cahiers d'Art. In 1959, back in Fortaleza, Chabloz introduced him to the rector of the Federal University of Ceará, who hired him to paint on the premises of the art museum the university was then setting up. From that group of about forty works came the twelve gouaches that represented Brazil at the 33rd Venice Biennale in 1966, where he received an honourable mention. The following year he took part in the 9th São Paulo Biennial.

His repertoire changed little in forty years: dragons, flying fish, birds and snakes in flat colour, without depth and without empty space, first in gouache on paper and later in acrylic on canvas. Critics classified him in turn as primitive, naïve and folk, and he rejected the most repeated reading of his subjects, that they were a memory of an Amazonian childhood. The largest public group of his works is in the museum of the Ceará university, and there is work also at Tate, at the Museu de Arte do Rio and at the naïve art museum of Laval, in France.

Demand outran what he could paint, and a collective workshop formed around him in the Pirambu district of Fortaleza, where pupils and relatives executed in stages the paintings he finished, signed and sold. It became known as the Escola do Pirambu, the Pirambu School. The arrangement became public in 1969, when Maria Augusta do Carmo Moreira, then fifteen, told the newspapers that she was the author of canvases signed by him. A decade of industrial-scale forgery followed, with his name on pictures sold as souvenirs at the doors of Fortaleza hotels, and the authorship of his work is still disputed. Ill and poor, he spent his last ten years between hospital stays for cirrhosis and alcoholism, and died in 1985. His work returned to museums in the 2020s, when curators began presenting him as an Indigenous artist, a classification that scholarship debates.

== Early life ==
Chico da Silva was born at the Alto Tejo, on the banks of the river of the same name in the Territory of Acre, near the Peruvian border, in an area that then belonged to the municipality of Cruzeiro do Sul and is now part of Marechal Thaumaturgo. He had no birth record, and the sources give dates almost twenty years apart: 1910 on his identity card, the date used by Roberto Galvão and by current scholarship; 1914 or 1916 in the painter's own interviews with the same author; 16 March 1922 in the catalogue of his first solo show; and 2 May 1928 in a 1972 conversation with the critic Luiz Ernesto Kawall. He had given the same year to the Correio da Manhã in June 1966, when he also said the family had moved to Fortaleza when he was eleven. The critic Estrigas argued for 1922 or 1923 and blamed the 1910 date on an error passed from catalogue to catalogue, among them Roberto Pontual's Dicionário das Artes Plásticas no Brasil.

He was the son of Minervina Félix de Lima, a woman from Ceará who had followed the rubber trade into the Amazon, and of a Peruvian caboclo surnamed Domingos da Silva, whom Galvão supposes to have been of Kampa origin. The 1961 catalogue names the father as Luiz Domingos da Silva. According to the son, his father owned boats and took the boy along on journeys upriver. The family returned to his mother's home state while he was still a child, and his father died in Ceará of a rattlesnake bite. He lived in Quixadá and then in the hills of Guaramiranga, and reached Fortaleza as a young man, settling in Pirambu, a strip of dunes and fishermen's shacks on the west side of the city.

He was illiterate all his life. As an adult, at the university museum, he learned to draw his own signature, and the thumbprint came later. Before he lived by painting he worked at whatever came: clog maker, shoemaker, barber, umbrella mender, and he made tin stoves to sell. A profile in the Fortaleza daily Unitário in 1967, by which time he was selling through galleries, still introduced him as a shoemaker who had taken up painting in his spare time. Around 1937 he began drawing on the whitewashed walls of the shacks at Praia Formosa, near the Passeio Público and the Poço da Draga.

== Chabloz and the first gouaches ==
In 1943 the Swiss painter Jean-Pierre Chabloz, in Fortaleza on the wartime rubber campaign, went with other artists on an outing to Praia Formosa and saw the paintings on the walls. He asked who had made them and was told it was an Indian who turned up, drew, and left. He left his address with the residents, and the two met months later. Chabloz commissioned work on paper, supplied the materials and paid in advance: sheets of bristol board, India ink, gouache, pastel, pencils, pens and brushes. Over his stays of 1943–1945 and 1947–1948 he built a collection of about twenty gouaches.

Before he became known, the neighbourhood took him for a simpleton, a judgement Estrigas would reject, describing him as quick and skilful, with no schooling. The first gouaches entered the Fortaleza salons in 1944, at the third Salão Cearense de Pintura. In 1945 Chabloz organised a show of artists from Ceará at the Askanasy gallery in Rio de Janeiro that included his work, and the first national criticism came out of it.

In that decade the pictures were barely sold at all. With no art market in Fortaleza, they circulated as gifts to members of the city's cultural elite, and a specialised trade only appeared in the 1960s, with the painter himself among the first names to sustain it.

Chabloz went back to Europe in 1948, taking the collection, and Chico da Silva put down his brushes for about ten years. The Fortaleza daily O Nordeste recorded his departure in August of that year. The pictures travelled without him: Geneva, at the Salon Beauregard, in 1949, where the Journal de Genève listed a show of "gouaches primitives" by the Amazonian Indian painter Francisco Silva, running to 12 October; Lausanne, at the Galerie Pour l'Art, in 1950; Lisbon, at the Brazilian embassy, in 1951; and Paris in 1952, where Chabloz showed them to André Malraux and to the critic Christian Zervos. Malraux replied by letter asking that walls be entrusted to the painter. In December 1952 Chabloz published "Un indien brésilien ré-invente la peinture" in Cahiers d'Art. From November 1955 to February 1956 the work was in Le Brésil, the survey of Brazilian primitive, popular and modern art that opened the ethnographic museum's exhibition hall in Neuchâtel, Switzerland.

== The university museum and the market ==
In November 1959, back in Fortaleza, Chabloz found him no longer painting and introduced him to Antônio Martins Filho, rector of the Federal University of Ceará, who was setting up the university's art museum. Hired by the university, Chico da Silva painted on the museum's own premises, and from there came the roughly forty works that form the core of that collection. His own account of the job was different: he told the Correio da Manhã in 1966 that he had lasted two days and left because he was shouted at, and a Fortaleza profile of 1967, which confirms that the rector took him on at a good salary, has him leaving with the remark that he was not a man to work for a boss. He took part in the museum's opening exhibition on 25 June 1961 with six gouaches. His first solo show had opened two months earlier, on 10 April, at the offices of the Diários Associados, and ran for a week. Surveys of Ceará artists published in Fortaleza in 1965 and 1967 still credited the Diários Associados with launching him.

Around 1963 he met Henrique Bluhm, a German opera singer who owned a snack bar in central Fortaleza, who became his first dealer and organised shows in Rio and São Paulo. Bluhm was the first person in Fortaleza to call himself a marchand, and after him came Maurício Xerez and José Edilson Pitombeira, known as Dão. In September of that year a solo show at the Galeria Relevo in Rio, organised by Jan Boghici, opened the southeastern market to him. Chabloz broke with him after returning from Europe in November 1962, having lost interest in what he called exploits "more worldly than artistic".

== Venice, 1966 ==
The critic Clarival do Prado Valladares put Chico da Silva in the Brazilian delegation to the 33rd Venice Biennale, choosing twelve works from the university museum's holdings in January 1966, and held out against pressure to drop him, which Roberto Galvão attributed to prejudice against primitive art and to market interests. In a letter that September, Valladares wrote that he had been "terribly opposed" in Venice by Brazilians hostile to the painter's presence. He did not travel. Four gouaches were hung, and the jury gave him the honourable mention after the critic showed five of its members the gouaches that had been left off the walls; the Brazilian commission withheld its approval of the award, which Valladares described as the first ever given to a primitive painter at the Biennale. The Biennale's own archive lists the four as Serpente della serra luminosa, Uccello e pesce roni, Drago con serpente and Tronco d'albero con serpente, all of them gouaches, and records the award as a menzione. Estrigas records that the prize Valladares had sought went to Arthur Luiz Piza, and treats the mention as the only award the painter received in his lifetime. It never reached his hands: in 1974 the mayor of Fortaleza was still trying to send him to Rio de Janeiro to collect it. The year after the Biennale he took part in the 9th São Paulo Biennial.

He never left Brazil, but told of journeys he had not made, to countries that included one he called Juberlano, and spoke of an audience with Queen Elizabeth II and a handshake from Charles de Gaulle. In 1977, asked by reporters to show it, he produced a passport that had expired ten years earlier with no exit visa in it.

== The Pirambu School ==
=== The workshop ===
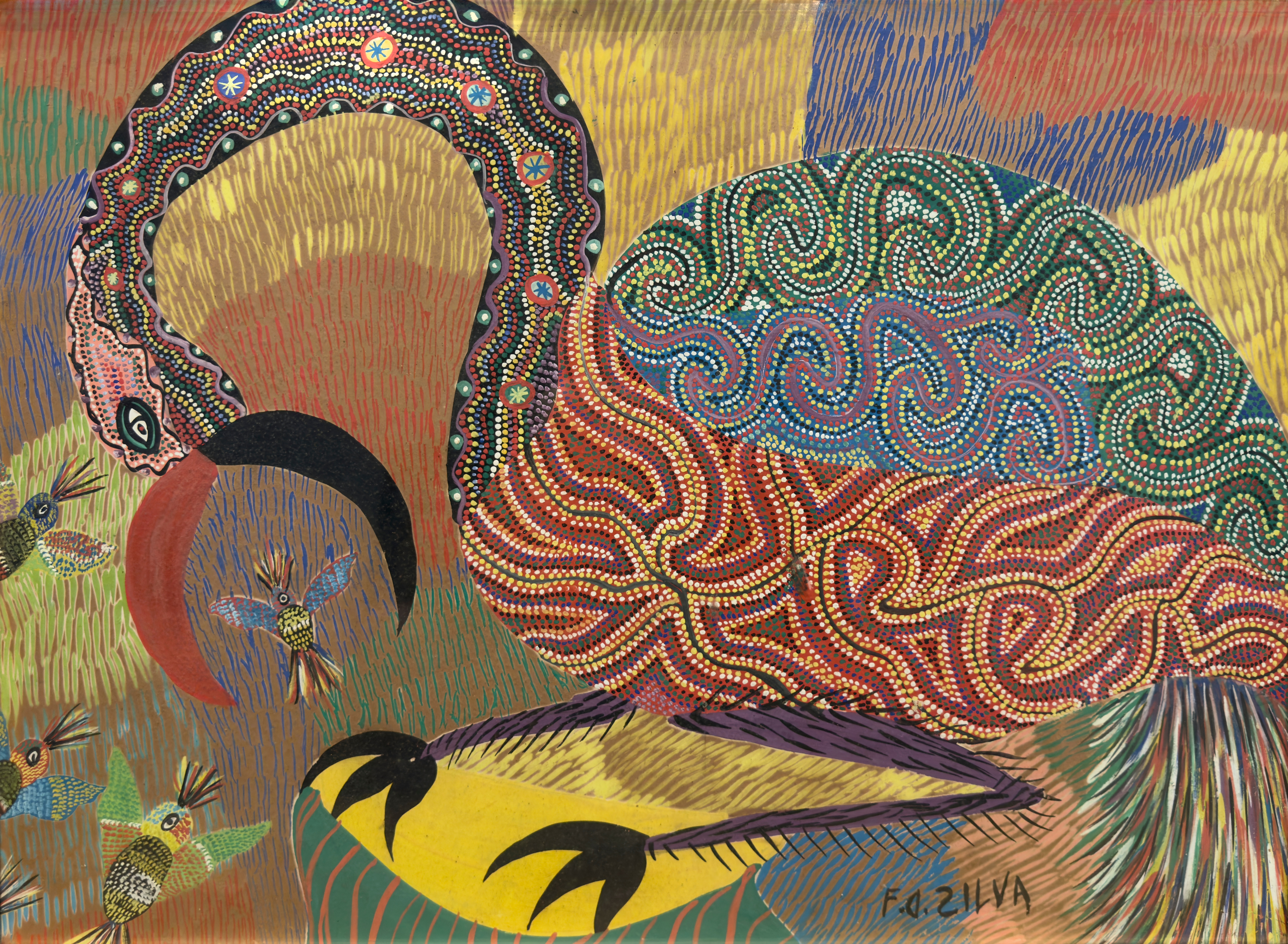
Ave Fantástica e Filhotes (Fantastic Bird and Fledglings), c. 1969. Gouache on paper, 43 × 59 cm. The stippling that covers the surface was the assistants' stage.

Demand outran what he could deliver, and between late 1963 and early 1964 he began working with assistants, boys from the neighbourhood. The initial core was five, aged between twelve and eighteen: Babá (Sebastião Lima da Silva), Claudionor (José Claudionor Nogueira), Garcia (José dos Santos Gomes), Ivan de Assis (Ivan José de Assis) and Chica (Francisca Silva), the painter's daughter. The work was divided by stage: Claudionor, Ivan and, rarely, Chico himself did the drawing; Babá, Ivan and Garcia filled in the colour and did the stippling; and he kept for himself the finishing, the varnish applied with a flit gun, the signature and the sale. Training was graded: an apprentice first filled in the outlines, then moved on to stippling, and only later was allowed to invent creatures of his own. All of them were paid for the work they did, and how much is the disputed point: Chica remembered being given thirty cruzeiros for a picture sold for a hundred.

Each of them left a mark on the repertoire: Babá's mandala-like algae, Ivan's mythological animals, Claudionor's human figures, Chica's rosettes and Raimundo Neto's monochrome gradients. Babá's handling became the standard the whole school worked towards, and some thought it better than the master's.

The workshop ran on anonymity. When a customer's car pulled up outside, the assistants had to leave over the back fence, because he did not want buyers to know the workshop existed. Galvão names twenty-seven people who painted as Chico da Silva, among pupils, relatives and workers in the parallel workshops, and reckons that at the peak the direct pupils came close to three dozen. A 1975 news report estimated that five hundred people in the district lived off the sale of these pictures.

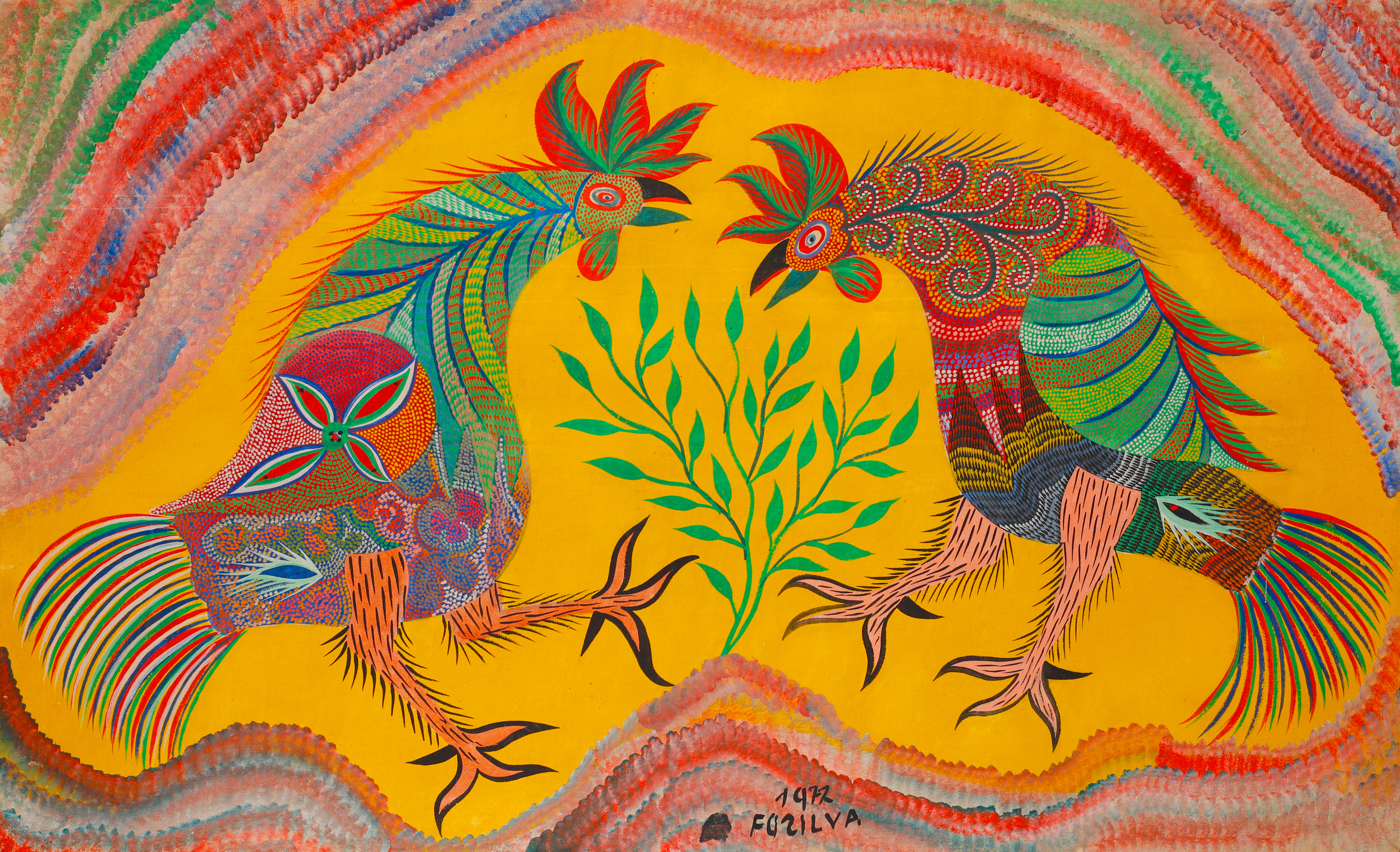
Briga de Galos (Cockfight), 1972. Gouache on canvas, 60 × 100 cm. It was through the parallel workshops that canvas replaced card.

Production soon left the house. Bluhm set up a workshop of his own in 1965, where Babá painted and Chico came by at the end of the day to sign. Silberstein, who followed the circuit closely, recorded that from then on the goods were treated as one and that Chico da Silva was often paid for the signature alone: finished batches arrived at his house from the parallel workshops to take his name, for a sum agreed on the spot. Maurício Xerez set up the second in 1967, with Ivan de Assis doing everything from the drawing to the stippling, and it was through these workshops that canvas replaced card: it was easier to work on and sold for more. A third bought sheets that had only been drawn on and hired a sign painter to colour them.

=== The 1969 case ===
The first public scandal came in February 1966, when the Jornal do Brasil reported that pictures sold in Rio as his had been commissioned from Babá; in the same article Bluhm turned the accusation around, saying that the painter was industrialising his own art with assistants who painted the canvases while he confined himself to signing them. That same year, with a solo show of his open at the Petite Galerie in Rio, his wife, Dalva da Silva, went to the police in Fortaleza to report that there were fakes among the works on display; he publicly contradicted his own wife and claimed the paintings as his. On 12 June, the day before that show opened with 35 works on paper, he had told the Correio da Manhã that gallery owners bought his pictures for a few thousand cruzeiros and resold them in Brazil and abroad for large sums, and that being barely literate left him open to it. Weeks before the Biennale, Valladares had already noted in a letter that, to keep up with demand, the artist was producing with the help of others, and that the assistants did the "filling".

On 12 June 1969 the Fortaleza newspaper Gazeta de Notícias published the statement of Maria Augusta do Carmo Moreira, aged fifteen: for almost five years she had painted for Chico da Silva, who then signed the pictures and sold them. She was paid two new cruzeiros for every three works, and said she had never smelled the money they brought in. The case went national within six days, with the test on the front page of O Globo, where she painted dragons, fish and birds in front of reporters. He denied everything, argued that the girl had not been born when he started painting, and offered to submit to any test; invited to paint beside her on television, he did not turn up. Chabloz, who had discovered him, told the press that the painter's art had been "vilely turned into a picture industry", and nicknamed the workshop the "Chico da Silva Picture Factory Ltd". In a signed article in the Jornal do Brasil that August he wrote that the poet-artist of former days had given way to the actor, the industrialist and the tradesman. His version of the accusation was an intermediate one: Maria Augusta had painted nothing, only coloured compositions sketched by Chico da Silva, which is precisely the first stage of training that Galvão describes.

=== Forgery and authentication ===
From the early 1970s the parallel production had no connection with the workshop at all. A travel guide published in the Jornal do Brasil in 1972 was already warning visitors that most of what was sold at hotel doors was fake. In 1974 the Ceará state culture council asked the Federal Police to identify the forgers, who had been at work for about three years, and pictures bearing his signature were sold in any square in Fortaleza for ten to fifty cruzeiros. The appeal was reported as far north as Belém, where a newspaper set it beside the painter's own statement that he had painted almost nothing in those same three years.

In 1976 the Jornal do Brasil estimated that anyone with a Chico da Silva painted after 1972 on the wall owned, in nine cases out of ten, a forgery, and spoke of 28 painters in Pirambu keeping up what it called a canvas industry. The same figure appears in the literature with a different frame: Galvão reckons that ninety per cent of what circulates under his signature came out of the School, and treats that as collective production rather than forgery. In the same years the price of a picture depended entirely on where it was bought: in 1977 an "authentic" work on the street went for thirty to fifty cruzeiros, and an authentic one from a dealer for twenty-five to thirty thousand.

The scale of the parallel circuit shows in the figures of the day. In March 1977 a column in the Correio do Ceará reckoned that Fortaleza was trading two to three thousand works bearing his name every month, and recorded the seizure of some three thousand apocryphal pictures by the Federal Police in the stalls of the old jailhouse market. The right to paint in his manner ended up restricted to the family, which created the market categories of "a Chico by Chica" and "a Chico by Roberto"; in June 1976 Chica told the newspapers she would start signing with her own name.

Against the copies, the painter and his intermediaries assembled an arsenal of marks: the signature with the stroke of the F underlining the name, the thumbprint beside it, certificates notarised and glued to the back of the canvases, and live painting sessions in front of buyers. None of it settled the question, and Gerciane Oliveira notes that every one of these markers was forged inside the same circuit that produced the works. As early as 1977 Lélia Coelho Frota wrote that he no longer executed the works circulating with his name and his "supposed fingerprint" on them. After a criminal case went nowhere, he began registering works at a notary's office. In 1979 he went back to the newspapers to accuse forgers, had his house stoned at night and asked for a police inquiry, and began denying in public that the Pirambu School existed at all: "there can be no school without a teacher", he said that July, "I never taught anyone anything, except my children Roberto and Chica". Between 1982 and 1983 the Fortaleza police seized more than six hundred fakes.

=== The Pirambu painters ===
The group's answer took shape in 1977. A study group had formed in late 1976 around the physician Hélio Rôla, the conservator Gilberto Brito and the political scientist David Silberstein, and in March 1977 the five pupils exhibited at the third Exanor as "Os Pintores do Pirambu", the occasion on which they began signing pictures with their own names. In April, in front of an audience and over seven days, the five painted with their master the panel Homens Trabalhando ("Men at Work"), four metres by two, which Rôla entered in the conceptual art category of the 27th Salão de Abril. Chico da Silva left hospital daily, where he was being treated for cirrhosis, to work on it, and signed it at the end. Silberstein, who took part, compared the scene to a small orchestra, with the master drawing the figures and then signalling each man's turn by gesture. In July three papers on the case were presented at the annual meeting of the Brazilian Society for the Advancement of Science.

Ownership of the panel stayed open for decades. In 2022 Flávia Muluc, Hélio Rôla and Garcia filed a dossier with the federal prosecution service asking that the university acquire it formally; the service agreed and opened a consensus process, and in 2023 the work entered the museum's collection, the same museum where the painter had worked in the 1960s. The original group had already scattered. Garcia left for São Paulo in 1973, because what the workshop paid was not enough to live on, and only returned to painting around 2000; Claudionor stopped painting canvases over the authenticity row and took it up again in about 2004, when the pupils came back into contact. Claudionor died in 2010, and Garcia was the only one of the five still living in 2024.

== Illness and death ==
His health began to give way in the mid-1970s. After a hospital stay in 1974 or 1975 he relapsed in May 1976 and was rushed to the infirmary of the naval apprentices' school with cirrhosis of the liver aggravated by chronic tuberculosis; in June he spent 48 hours in the intensive care unit of the university hospital. That September he became delirious and was moved to a clinic with a diagnosis of alcoholic psychosis, where he spent almost a year, painting as occupational therapy. He blamed his ruin on drink himself.

On 29 December 1974 the state and the city had given him a house with a studio in Pirambu, presented as a guarantee of provenance for anyone buying directly from the artist; the support facilities promised with it were never built, and after 1977 he did not live there again. Speaking for him in that last decade were Francisca Margarida da Silva and Agostinho Ramires, a couple who said they were his niece and nephew and who took him out of the clinic in August 1977. Galvão attributes to them the turn of 1979, when the painter began denying that the School existed. Two days after the death his son Roberto put to the Fortaleza press the demand he was still making in 1986: that the couple, who ran the booth at the airport, hand over his father's paintings, press cuttings, photographs and awards. A thrombosis in 1978 and another in February 1981 paralysed his right side and left him bedridden for more than eight months; he was left-handed and went on painting. From 1981, with a booth at Pinto Martins airport obtained through Luíza Távora, then the state's first lady, he painted about three pictures a week, to pay, he said, for his own funeral. In June 1983 Ceará granted him a life pension of two minimum wages by law. On 28 March 1984 he received the Medalha da Abolição, the state's highest decoration, from governor Gonzaga Mota.

Chico da Silva died at 3:20 am on 6 December 1985 at the Policlínica in Fortaleza, of a stroke arising from chronic pulmonary emphysema, four days after being admitted. His body lay at the Casa de Cultura Raimundo Cela and was buried the same afternoon at the Parque da Paz cemetery, where Chabloz had been buried eighteen months earlier. The state paid for the funeral, and there were four wreaths on the coffin. The next day O Povo ran the front-page headline "Ceará perde Chico da Silva e poucos vão ao cemitério" ("Ceará loses Chico da Silva and few go to the cemetery"), with the governor's remark about the ingratitude of those who had ignored him while he lived. He died without property: his children were left the house the government had given him and the medal. An agency obituary carried the news as far as Cuiabá, and remarked that the dealers who had promoted him at his peak did not come to the cemetery.

== Personal life ==
The companion the record names is Maria Dalva da Silva, whom he said he had met in Salvador, the daughter of a Bahian woman who sold acarajé in the Pelourinho. The press treated her as his wife, but he denied ever having married, and there is no civil record of a union. Dalva died in the mid-1970s, and he pointed to her death as the beginning of his ruin. The number of children he claimed varied with the interview, from four in 1961 to twelve or thirteen in the 1970s, but only two appear anywhere in the record: Francisca, known as Chica, who painted in the workshop and later signed with her own name, and Roberto. In his last year he was cared for by his daughter-in-law, Alderisa da Silva.

Contemporary profiles describe him as short and thickset, with a broad face and narrow eyes, dressed in white linen and white shoes, talkative and quick with a rhyme, and known in the district as "Dr. Chico". He had healthy teeth pulled to fit a gold denture, which he showed off when he laughed and pawned when money was short. By 1979 a profile in the Santos daily A Tribuna reported that not even the gold denture had survived. A retail group gave him a car in 1975, and five years later he told the newspapers he had had to sell his telephone to keep up the payments on it. He said he had no religion, but confessed and took first communion in hospital in May 1976.

== Work ==
=== Technique and materials ===
The murals at Praia Formosa were made with charcoal, chalk and pieces of brick and roof tile on the whitewash, and with pigment he pulled out of leaves by rubbing them on the wall itself. Four decades later he described the beginning in the same terms: "when I started I painted with charcoal, green leaves from the bush, white and red brick".

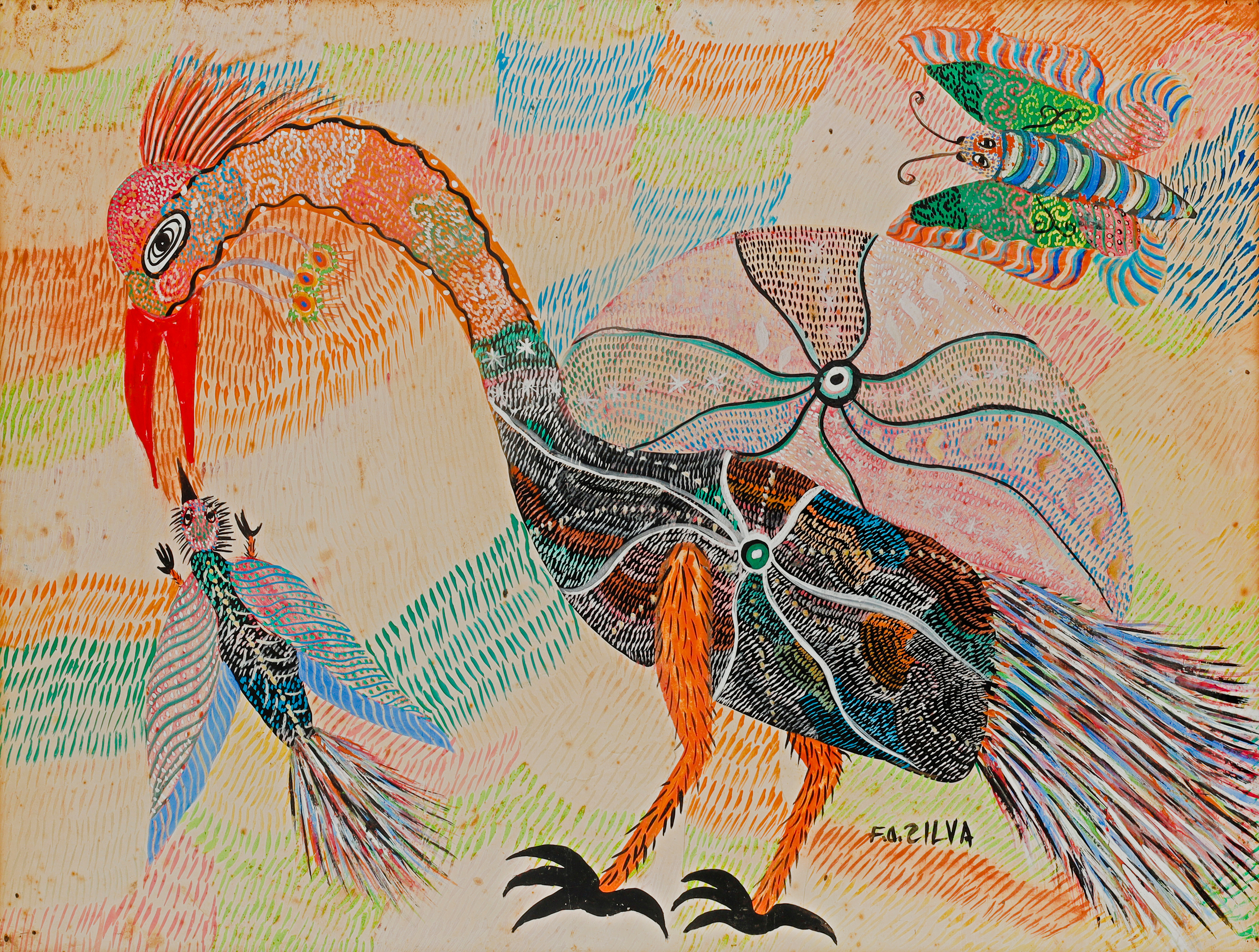
Aves Fantásticas e Borboleta (Fantastic Birds and Butterfly), c. 1967. Gouache on paper, 55 × 76 cm. Trading the wall for paper brought more durable colour and easel scale.

Trading the wall for paper, he gained a wider and more durable range of colour, and began working at easel scale. Chabloz refused to teach him oil painting, which he thought too heavy and too opaque for that work, and talked him out of painting the human figure. He thought the logical outcome of that body of work would have been fresco, and asked the Ceará authorities to send the painter to learn the technique.

Chico da Silva was left-handed and painted fast: "it is as if I had a sewing machine inside my arm", he said in 1972. He made no preparatory study of the composition, and drew the outline of the first figure without minding whether it ran off the edge of the sheet. The card was tacked to the wall with cobbler's pins, and there were always spare drawings waiting for colour. Colour went on flat, without gradation, and over it came the stippling, called pigmentação in the workshop, done with a brush loaded with two or three colours at once. The finishing was his, with a coat of varnish applied from a flit gun.

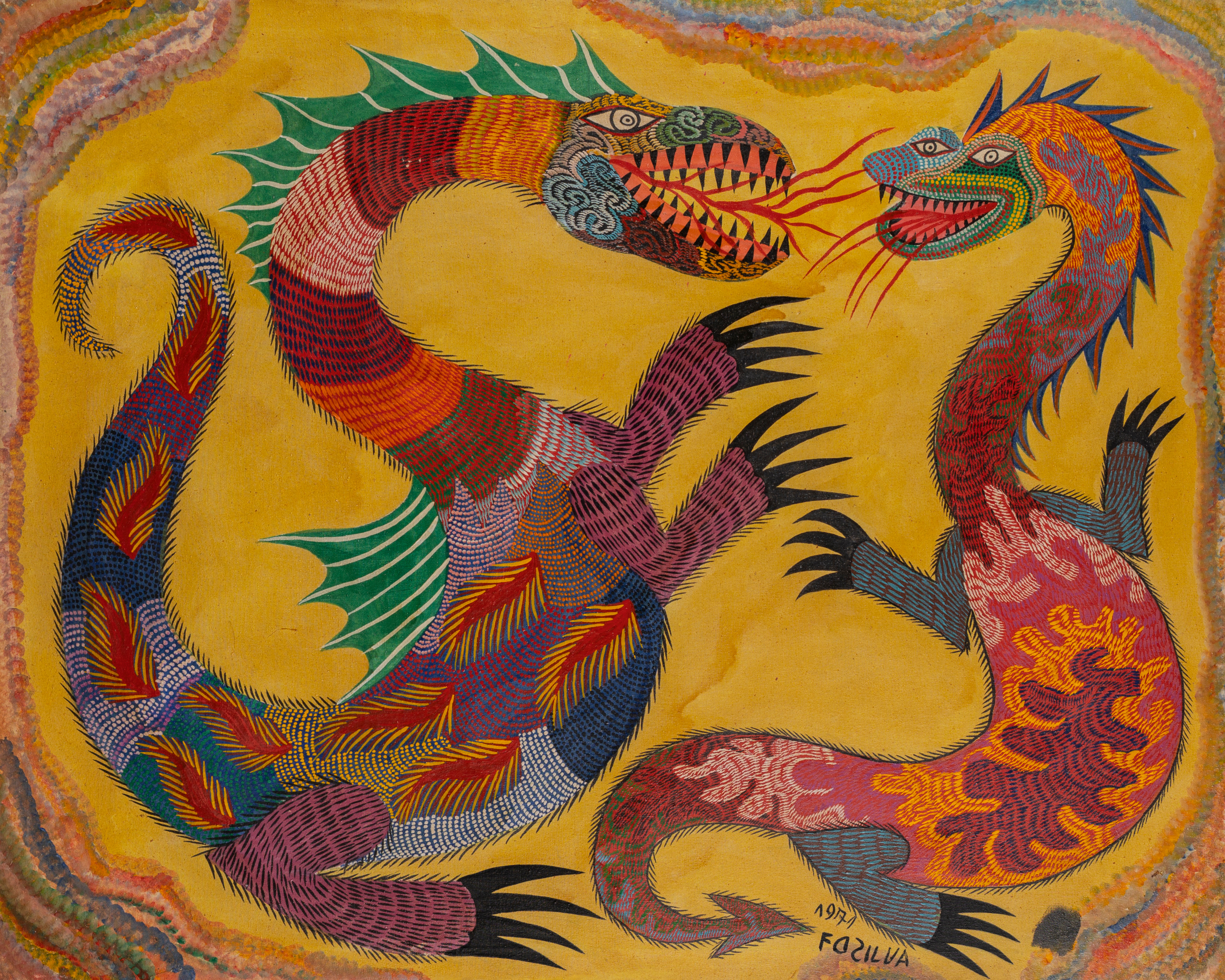
Dragões (Dragons), 1971. Acrylic on canvas, 64 × 80 cm. Colour goes on flat, and the stippling comes over it.

The support changed three times in forty years: from the wall to bristol board and card, then to coloured duplex paper, which spared him painting the ground, and finally to canvas. Acrylic paint appears in catalogue entries from the late 1970s, on board and on canvas, and coexisted with gouache and tempera to the end. Outside the gallery circuit he also painted on kraft paper, cloth, plywood, hardboard and on earthenware jars, pots and bowls. The usual formats are small and medium, and the large panel is the exception. He signed "F. D. Silva" and stamped his thumbprint beside it, dipped in the same paint as the picture. The letters are unevenly formed in surviving examples: on a canvas of 1983 catalogued in the João Cunha Collection the name is inscribed at the lower centre with the D and the S reversed.

=== Subjects ===
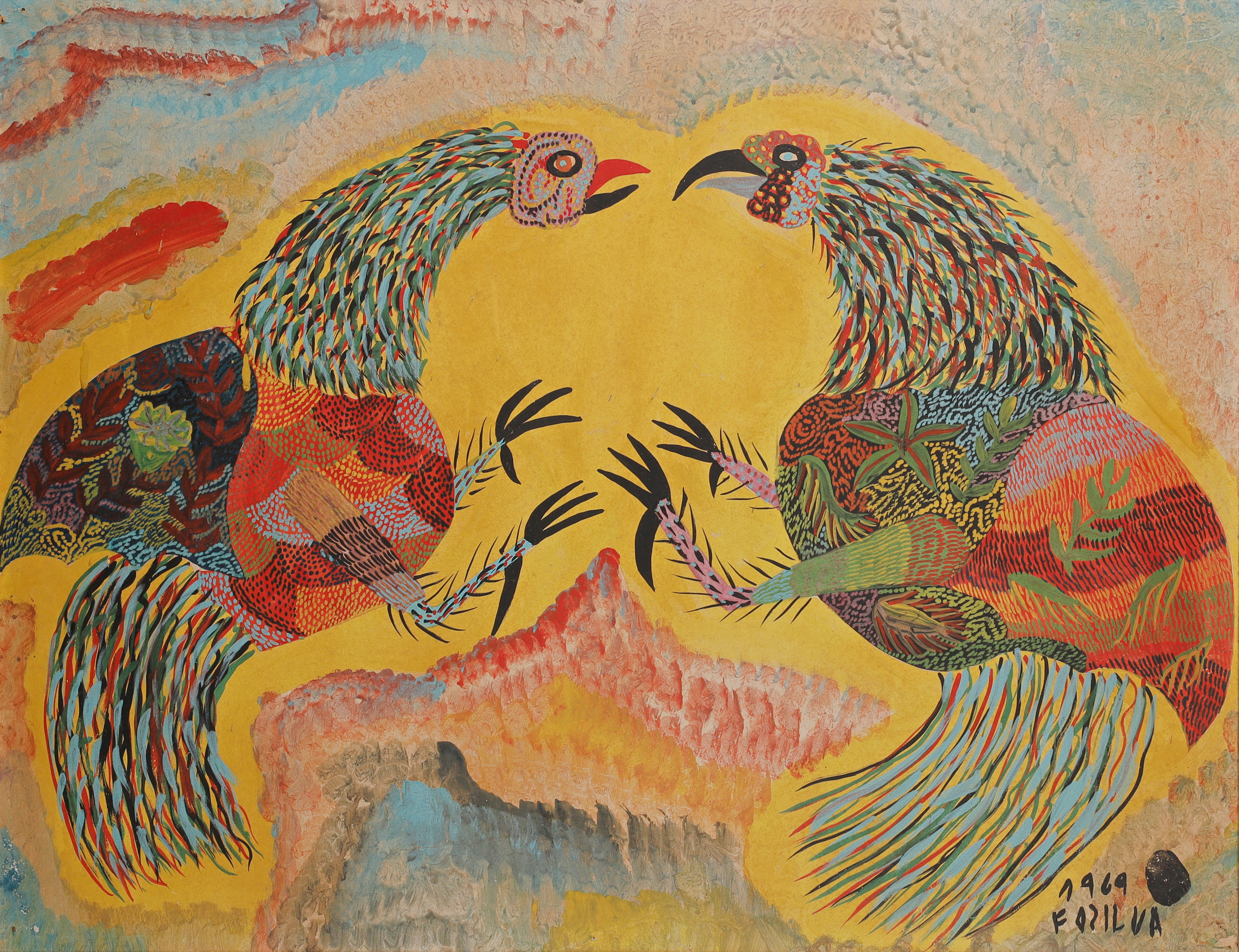
Rinha de Galos (Cockfight), 1969. Gouache on paper laid on hardboard, 53 × 67 cm. The cockfight entered the repertoire at a buyer's request.

The repertoire settled early and changed little. What Chabloz saw on the walls in 1943 was already most of it: large birds of elegant line, somewhat monstrous fish, and ghost ships. Thirty years later the painter listed the same cast: "dragons, fish, birds, roosters, the monstrous snakes, the butterflies and a few wattled jacanas". The colours are raw and flat, without gradation or any suggestion of depth, and the surface leaves no empty space.

Critics read the work as a memory of an Amazonian childhood from the first review on, and the painter rejected that reading. In 1972 he told Kawall that the worlds he painted were not a boy's recollections: "this is called imagination, occult sciences, astronomy". For the monsters he offered two other explanations, the cinema and drink: he thought they existed because he had seen them in films, and called the visions "hallucinations that come with cachaça".

For Gerciane Oliveira the simplification of the repertoire from the 1960s on has a material and economic cause: the motifs were pared down into standard models precisely so that many hands could execute them.

Two motifs the public associates with him came later, at buyers' request. The cockfight came from the roosters of Aldemir Martins, and both Galvão and Garcia credit the adaptation to Ivan de Assis, who is said to have started from the cover of a school notebook. The dragons came from the alligator stamped on the tin of Querosene Jacaré, and Galvão credits that borrowing to Claudionor, on Estrigas's information. The black ground, which became the mark of the workshop's output, was adopted because it sold, and who thought of it changes with the source: Galvão credits the black grounds to Soldadinho, Oswald Barroso credits them to Raimundo Neto, and the 2024 catalogue credits no one. With collective production the handling changed in kind: the stippling grew colder and closer to a halftone screen, and the colour more sharply contrasted.

Three canvases from the early 1970s: the repertoire pared down into models many hands could execute

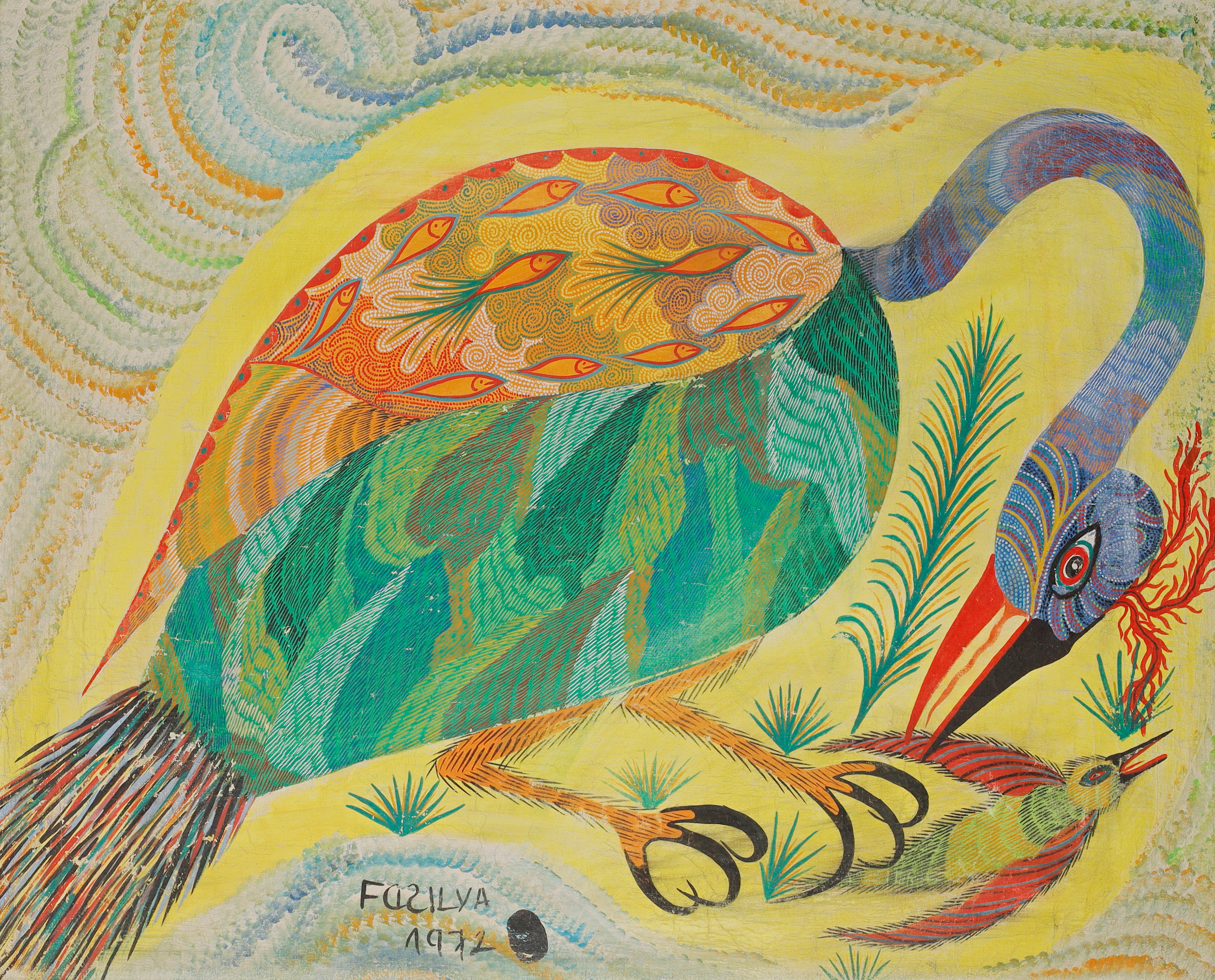
Sem título (Untitled), 1972. Acrylic on canvas, 77 × 89 cm

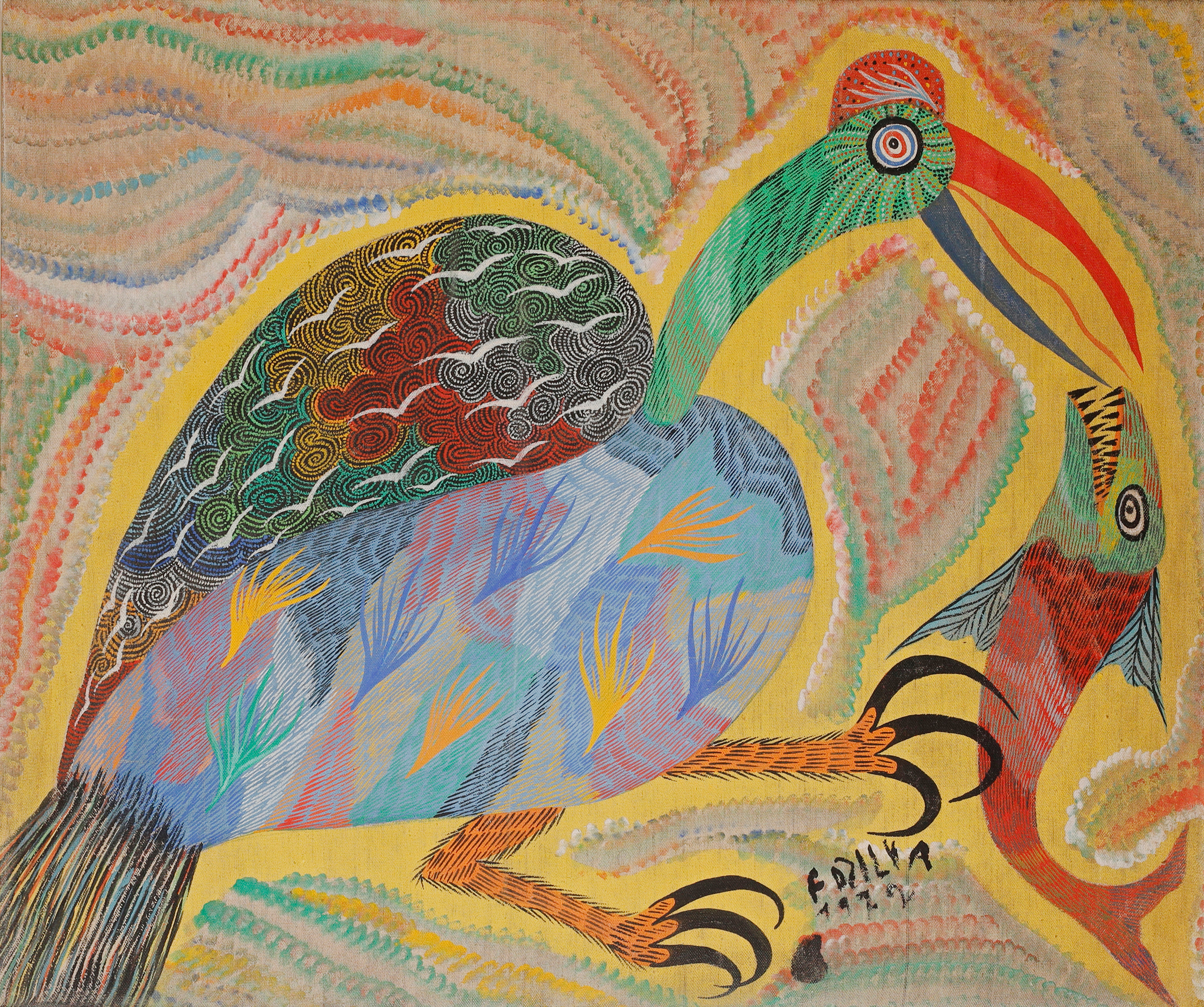
Sem título (Untitled), 1972. Acrylic on canvas, 60 × 72 cm

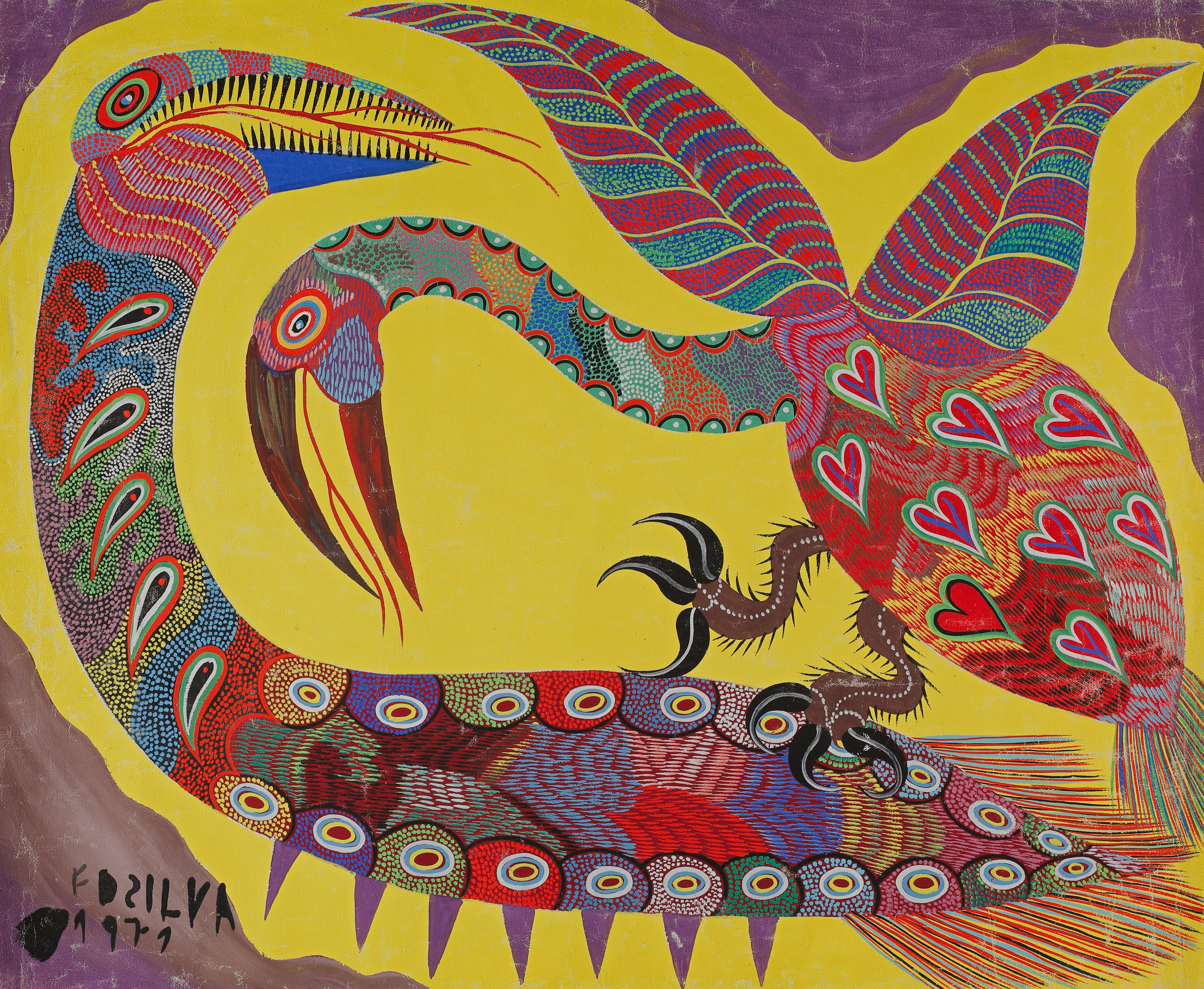
Sem título (Untitled), 1971. Acrylic on canvas, 57 × 71 cm

== Critical reception ==
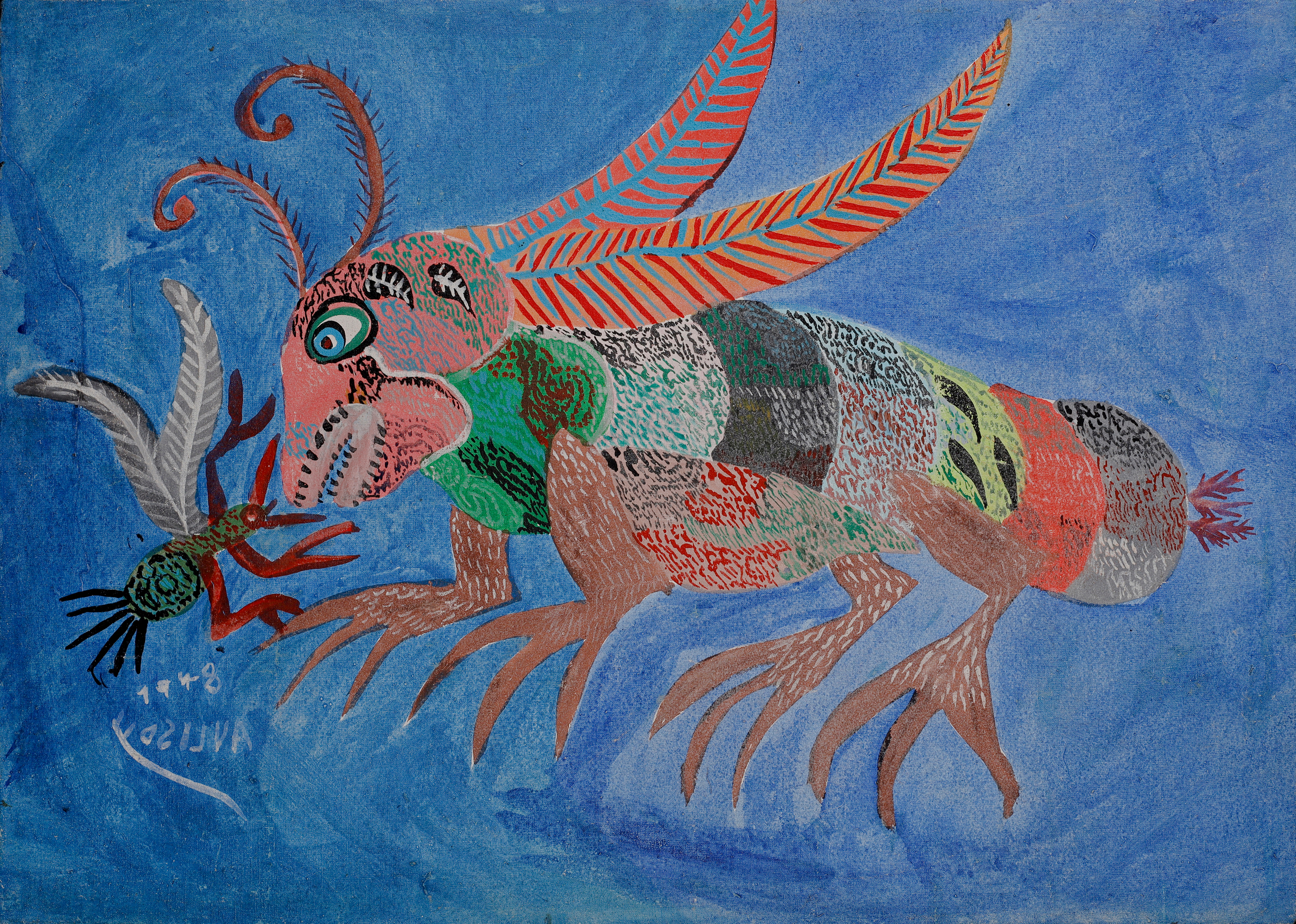
Animais Fantásticos (Fantastic Animals), 1978. Acrylic on canvas, 42 × 60 cm. Chabloz and Frota allowed only the first phase, the gouaches of the 1940s.

The first national criticism came with the 1945 show in Rio de Janeiro, introduced by Rubem Navarra, for whom the gouaches were "something very serious indeed" and an example of what lay in potential in Indigenous sensibility. In Fortaleza the painter Mário Baratta rejected Navarra's comparison with Salvador Dalí and saw "far greater affinities" with Raoul Dufy, in a text that also founded the argument from uncontaminated purity.

The international reception came from Chabloz, who later disowned it. In the Cahiers d'Art article of 1952 he argued that the painter had travelled alone, in a few years, the whole cycle of Western painting, from archaism to the modern. In art journals he presented him as "gloriously primitive, divinely illiterate" and, above all, as a remarkable artist who had lacked nothing but an opportunity. In 1969 he broke with him publicly, and in 1980 told a newspaper that he had become a celebrity, lost his originality and turned into a doubtful painter. Against the primitivist current, Valladares argued in 1966 that Chico da Silva was in no way crude, but a professional with nearly thirty years of practice, and read the work as one man's fixing of an oral Amazonian mythology.

Out of the break came the yardstick the market still uses: Chabloz argued in 1969 that only the gouaches of 1943–1945 and 1947–1949 resisted imitation, and Frota, in 1977, would save only that first phase. The comparison with the great workshops of art history came up while the case was still hot: in July 1969 the critic José Roberto Teixeira Leite set the Pirambu workshop beside those of Rubens and Caravaggio, with the caveat that they supervised what left under their names. In 1976 the critic Walmir Ayala gave his column in the Diário de Notícias over to the case and proposed a division in three: the painter's own work, the school that painted under his supervision and received his thumbprint, and those who painted without him. With pupils painting as well as the master, he argued, establishing authorship had stopped mattering, and a buyer would do better to pick the best picture than the authentic one.

In 1977 two studies of the case appeared side by side in the same issue of the Revista de Ciências Sociais of the Ceará university. Lélia Coelho Frota proposed the category of liminality to describe the painter's position between two worlds, claimed "primitive" as a positive term, and judged the late work the most extreme case of a primitive undone by the market. David Silberstein reversed the charge: he read the case through colonialism, explained Chabloz's attack by nostalgia for a lost paradise, and argued that criticism had reduced the work to Amazonian exoticism and erased what was north-eastern and urban in it. The same year the newspaper Movimento asked why the work of Chico da Silva and the other poor painters was called an industry rather than a school. The magazine Arte Hoje, in 1978, answered that the collective character had never been a secret and that the market preferred not to see it.

=== Naïve, primitive, Indigenous ===
The classification of the work has changed several times and has always been contested. The press of the 1970s alternated between primitive, naïve, primitivist and folk. From 2020 curators began presenting him as an Indigenous artist: Jochen Volz, director of the Pinacoteca do Estado de São Paulo, wrote in 2023 that the work had for decades been superficially labelled naïve, regional and decorative, and the international coverage of that year treated the painter as a forerunner of a generation of Indigenous artists.

The curators behind the return also changed the terms of authorship. Thierry Freitas, who organised the 2023 exhibition, proposes replacing the primitive genius with the cultural mediator and rejects the idea of copying, arguing that every member of the School made "Chicos" and that each of those is singular. Oswald Barroso holds that there was no forgery but a collision between collective making and a market that demands an individual signature. The curator Raphael Fonseca, who presented the 2022 solo show in São Paulo, ties the revision to the current prominence of Indigenous artists.

The sociologist Gerciane Oliveira, who has studied the case since 2015, calls the movement a reclassification and observes that it rehabilitates not so much the painter as his condition as an Indigenous artist. She argues that neither the formal traits nor paternal descent are enough to ground the classification, above all given the artist's own denial of tribal ancestry, and notes that the Indigenous key pushes into the background his place in Pirambu, an urban and peripheral territory, along with the cinema and advertising references in the work. Among Indigenous artists themselves the reading is not unanimous: Jaider Esbell, who cited his influence, referred to him as a mixed-race artist.

== Rediscovery and market ==
The market had already collapsed in his lifetime. In October 1980, of the nine Rio galleries the Jornal do Brasil canvassed, only three admitted to holding work by him, and all reported falling prices and doubts about authorship. By 1983 he could not sell a picture for more than fifty thousand cruzeiros, and that year one of his paintings was knocked down at auction for twenty thousand, against more than a million paid for works by Antônio Bandeira and Aldemir Martins. In January 1986, a month after his death, a dealer told a Fortaleza newspaper that Chico da Silva had no market value.

What kept him in circulation over the next two decades was Ceará. In 1989 a retrospective in Fortaleza gathered the late work under the title "Do delírio ao dilúvio", which became the title of Galvão's book, and in 2001 the state bought the surviving gouaches from the collection Chabloz had taken to Europe, bringing them back in the exhibition "Chico da Silva vê Chabloz vê Chico da Silva". For the family the interval changed little: in 1999 a grandson, Gerardo da Silva, showing his own painting in Fortaleza, told the Diário do Nordeste that they were still asking the government for the painter's house back in order to make a museum of it.

The work returned to institutions in the 2020s. In 2020 El Museo del Barrio in New York included two of his gouaches in "Popular Painters & Other Visionaries", the museum's first online exhibition, curated by Rodrigo Moura, whose text expressly rejects the naïve and primitive labels. In 2022 there were two solo shows in São Paulo, at the Museu de Arte Sacra and at the Gomide&Co gallery, and a monographic presentation at the Independent fair in New York, brought by the São Paulo gallery Galatea. In March 2023 the Pinacoteca do Estado de São Paulo opened "Chico da Silva e o ateliê do Pirambu", curated by Thierry Freitas, with 124 works made between 1943 and 1984, presented by the institution as the largest ever devoted to the artist, and which travelled in July to the Pinacoteca do Ceará with 148 works and a new title, "Chico da Silva e a Escola do Pirambu". On 27 October that year the David Kordansky Gallery opened his first major solo show in New York, with some 25 paintings and works on paper from the 1960s and early 1970s. In March 2024 the gallery BANK, in Shanghai, presented "Chico da Silva: Amazônian Legend" as his first solo exhibition in Asia. Between November 2024 and January 2025 Mendes Wood DM put his paintings in dialogue with those of Alvaro Barrington in São Paulo. In March 2025 the David Kordansky gallery opened "Amazônico" in Los Angeles, his first solo show in the city, which brought together paintings of the 1980s alongside works of the 1960s. From June to September 2026 Nottingham Contemporary is showing "And the soul is for the birds", which the institution presented as his first solo exhibition at a European institution; the title translates something he said to Kawall in 1972, "e a alma é para passarinho".

The market followed. On 14 November 2023 Sotheby's sold Serpente da serra luminosa, a gouache of about 1966 on paper laid on board measuring 119 by 203 cm, in New York, for $330,200 with buyer's premium against an estimate of $60,000 to $80,000, about four times the high estimate. The other big houses followed. Phillips has brought nine of his lots to sale, the dearest of them Bichos e Pássaros at $76,200; Christie's sold untitled works in London for £35,280 and in New York for $32,760; and Bonhams put canvases of the 1970s into sales in London in 2024 and Paris in 2025.

The New York Times described him in October of that year as one of the first Brazilian artists of Indigenous descent to reach international fame, and reported that contemporary Brazilian Indigenous artists, among them Denilson Baniwa and Jaider Esbell, have cited his influence. In the same article the dealer David Kordansky said he wanted to draw attention to the legacy of an artist who had opened the way for the Indigenous generation then emerging in Brazil, and defended the workshop by asking why the practice was acceptable in Andy Warhol's Factory and not in Pirambu. Graham Steele, who organised the New York show with the dealer Alexandra Mollof, held that Chabloz had been as much the painter's coloniser as his champion, and placed the work among Brazilian modernists such as Lygia Pape, Lygia Clark, Hélio Oiticica and Mira Schendel.

== Exhibitions and collections ==
After the Venice Biennale the shows multiplied, mostly in Rio and São Paulo. In November 1970 he opened a solo exhibition of 35 canvases at the Galeria Portal on Avenida Paulista. In September 1972 he showed about forty pictures at the Sudene gallery in Recife; in February 1973, 63 works at the Pinacoteca do Estado do Amazonas in Manaus, the city nearest his birthplace that his work ever reached; and in 1974, fifty pictures by the school in the annexe of the Chamber of Deputies in Brasília, in a charity show. In 1979, already ill, he had shows at Infraero in Brasília, the Galeria Arte Brasileira in São Paulo and Paratur in Belém. Abroad, besides the shows Chabloz took over in the 1940s and 1950s, Estrigas's list records the Galerie Jeanne Bucher in Paris in 1952, the Galerie Jacques Massol, also in Paris, in December 1965, and a solo exhibition in Moscow in 1966.

The art museum of the Federal University of Ceará holds 78 of his works and keeps a permanent room devoted to the artist; most of that collection is made up of the gouaches he painted on the museum's own premises in the early 1960s, among them the twelve that represented Brazil in Venice; a further forty came in 2014, given by Vera Bezerra. In 2024 the Pinacoteca do Ceará put on public view twenty works from its own holdings, by him, by Garcia and by Chica da Silva. The Museu de Arte Moderna in Rio has two paintings in its Gilberto Chateaubriand collection, one of them dated 1966, and the Museu de Arte Contemporânea of the University of São Paulo has one. The Museu de Arte do Rio has two gouaches from the 1960s, given by the Fundo Max Perlingeiro, which it showed in 2014 in "Encontro de Mundos" and in "Pororoca: a Amazônia no MAR", the latter running from September to November of that year and organised by Paulo Herkenhoff around the museum's Amazonian holdings. In Belém, the city's art museum lists him among the artists in the collection of some two thousand pieces it began forming in 1991. In Brasília, the Chamber of Deputies holds an untitled 1973 painting, acrylic on canvas measuring 200 by 248 cm, on display at the Green Hall Coffee Shop.

Outside Brazil, the naïve art museum of Laval, in France, holds Animaux fantastiques, a gouache of 1966. The collection the Brazilian dealer Cérès Franco built in Paris, now at the La Coopérative museum in Montolieu in southern France, holds an untitled gouache of 1966 measuring 56 by 77 cm, and lent six drawings of the same year to the Fondation Cartier for the exhibition "Histoires de voir" in 2012. The Rollins Museum of Art in Florida received Fighting Roosters, a 1974 gouache on canvas, in 2024, as a gift from the collection of Benjamin Ortíz and Victor P. Torchia Jr. Tate has held The Great Bird, a 1966 gouache on plywood measuring 150 by 220 cm, on long-term loan from the Tate Americas Foundation since 2022. Alongside the 2023 exhibition, the Pinacoteca de São Paulo acquired a work by him for its permanent collection for the first time. The Centre Pompidou in Paris holds two works given by the São Paulo gallery Galatea in 2023 and inventoried the following year: Luta de dragões, a gouache of 1960 on paper laid on card and hardboard, and A luta pela vida, of about 1964, both in the graphic arts cabinet of the Musée national d'art moderne.

== Honours ==
In 1978 the São Paulo city council awarded him the Anchieta Medal, and the same year he was invited to the first Latin American Biennial. In 1984 the government of Acre gave him the Order of the Star of Acre. In 1975 Pedro Jorge de Castro made a documentary about him that won the following year's prize for best film in the visual arts category at the first national documentary festival in Curitiba, and in 1978 was selected for the international festival of films on art at Asolo, Italy. In December 2019 the city of Fortaleza declared 2020 a commemorative year for the artist, with a seminar and the dedication of the 71st Salão de Abril.

== Sources ==
- Barroso, Oswald (2019). Antropologia da arte (in Portuguese) (3rd ed.). Fortaleza: EdUECE.
- Estrigas (1988). A saga do pintor Francisco Domingos da Silva (in Portuguese). Fortaleza: Edições Tukano.
- Frota, Lélia Coelho (1977). "Liminaridade da obra de Francisco da Silva face aos modos "normais" da criação artística no Brasil". Revista de Ciências Sociais (in Portuguese). VIII (1–2). Fortaleza: Universidade Federal do Ceará: 205–217.
- Galvão, Roberto (1986). Chico da Silva e a Escola do Pirambu (in Portuguese). Fortaleza: Secretaria de Cultura e Desporto.
- Galvão, Roberto (1989). Chico da Silva: do delírio ao dilúvio (in Portuguese). Fortaleza: Costa Gráfica.
- Galvão, Roberto (2005). Chico da Silva em três dimensões (in Portuguese). Fortaleza: Centro Cultural Banco do Nordeste.
- Herkenhoff, Paulo (2014). "A arte de ciclos da borracha: seringueiros artistas". Pororoca: a Amazônia no MAR (in Portuguese). Rio de Janeiro: Museu de Arte do Rio. pp. 195–207.
- Muluc, Flávia, ed. (2024). A Escola do Pirambu: um legado de Chico da Silva (in Portuguese). Fortaleza: Gráfica LCR. ISBN 978-85-7915-557-4.
- Oliveira, Gerciane Maria da Costa (2017). "Autenticidade, produção coletiva e mercado de pintura". Revista de Ciências Sociais (in Portuguese). 48 (1). Fortaleza: 69–88.
- Oliveira, Gerciane Maria da Costa (2017b). "Quando um estilo artístico individual se torna uma maneira de pintar? O caso do artista naïf Chico da Silva". Crítica Cultural (in Portuguese). 12 (2). Palhoça: 305–313.
- Oliveira, Gerciane Maria da Costa (2019). "Entre lógicas distintas de comercialização de pintura". Sociedade e Estado (in Portuguese). 34 (2). Brasília: 440–453.
- Oliveira, Gerciane Maria da Costa (2024). "Chico da Silva, o pioneiro da arte indígena? A dinâmica de reclassificação do artista acreano em recentes exposições". MODOS: Revista de História da Arte (in Portuguese). 8 (2). Campinas: 706–726. doi:10.20396/modos.v8i2.8675001.
- Oliveira, Gerciane Maria da Costa (2025). "Reclassificações e reconhecimentos: o papel dos museus e curadorias na trajetória de Chico da Silva". Anais do 49º Encontro Anual da ANPOCS (in Portuguese). São Paulo.
- Silberstein, David A. (1977). "Colonialismo e cultura popular: o caso de Chico da Silva". Revista de Ciências Sociais (in Portuguese). VIII (1–2). Fortaleza: Universidade Federal do Ceará: 219–232.
