= Bernaldina José Pedro =

Brazilian activist, tribal leader, and shaman (1945–2020)

- Born: Koko Meriná Eremunkon; 25 March 1945; St. Cuthbert's Mission, Guyana
- Died: 24 June 2020 (aged 75); Boa Vista, Roraima, Brazil
- Occupation: Tribal leader

Bernaldina José Pedro (25 March 1945 – 24 June 2020), commonly known as Grandma Bernaldina, (Portuguese: Vovó Bernaldina) was a Brazilian activist, tribal leader, and shaman. A member of the Mascushi people, she was known for her knowledge of tribal customs. Pedro was also known for her strong support of Pope Francis. She died in 2020 from complications related to COVID-19.

== Biography ==
Pedro was born Koko Meriná Eremunkon on 25 March 1945 in Guyana. She was part of the Macushi people, an indigenous people who live in Guyana, Northern Brazil, and Venezuela. Pedro eventually married into a Macushi family living in Northern Brazil, and over the years she became a leader of her new community. She became known as an advocate for indigenous people's rights, advocating for the establishment of a land reservation for the Macushi people. In addition, she became known as someone who was knowledgeable about traditional medicine, music, crafts, and culture. A strong supporter of Pope Francis II, in 2018 Pedro met the Pope at a public event in Rome.

During the COVID-19 pandemic, Pedro managed her village's response to the pandemic. She eventually contracted the virus and died of complications on 24 June 2020.
