= Jaider Esbell =

Macuxi artist (died 2021)

- Born: 1979; Normandia, Roraima, Brazil
- Died: November 2021 (aged 41); São Paulo, Brazil
- Education: Federal University of Roraima
- Occupations: artist, writer, indigenous rights activist

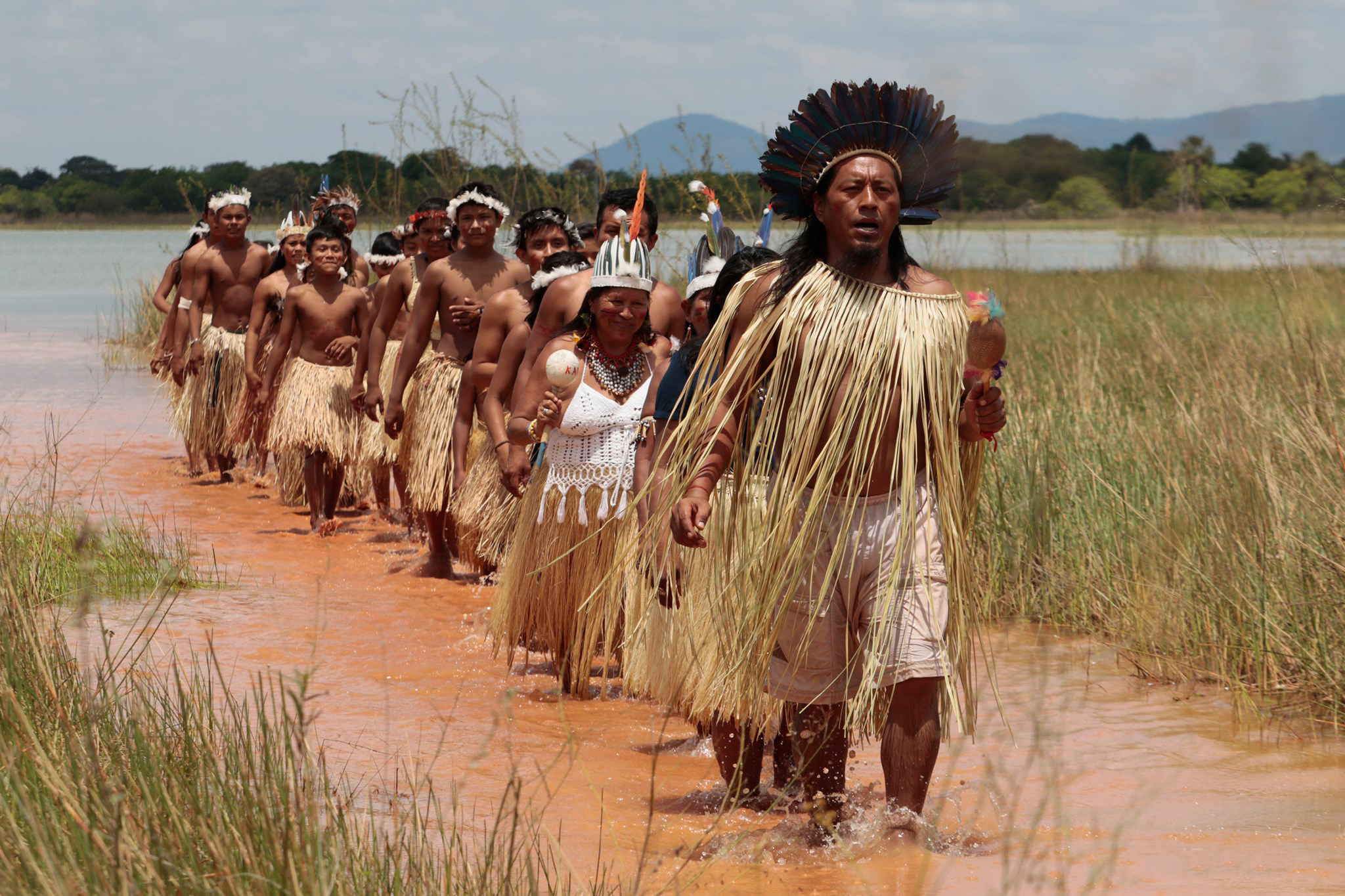
Jaider Esbell with Macuxi people

Jaider Esbell (1979 in Normandia – November 2, 2021, in São Paulo) was a Brazilian writer, artist, art educator, curator, geographer, and indigenous rights activist.

He was one of the most renowned Macuxi artists in Brazil, his works were displayed at the 2021 São Paulo Biennial and 2022 Venice Biennale.

== Biography ==
Jaider was born in a village of the Macuxi people in Raposa Serra do Sol indigenous territory, Roraima, in 1979. He was homeschooled by his adoptive mother Bernaldina José Pedro, a famous Macuxi activist, tribal leader, and shaman, who died in June 2020 from COVID-19. Already as a young man, Jaider started to engage in social activism.

He left his village at the age of 18 to continue his studies in Boa Vista. He started working as an electrician at Eletrobras, which allowed him to travel around the country and expand his knowledge of the indigenous culture. It was at that time that he made his first attempts at painting and writing but ended up destroying everything he had created. In 2007, he graduated in geography from the Federal University of Roraima and, in 2009, he obtained a specialization in Environmental Management and Sustainable Development from the Faculty of International Technology.

In 2010, he won a scholarship from the National Arts Foundation (Funarte) to write his first book, Terreiro de Makunaima – Myths, Legends and Stories in Experiences, which was published in 2012. From then on he started to pursue his artistic vocation.

== Career ==
Jaider Esbell played a key role in the movement for institutional acknowledgement of indigenous art, alongside such artists as Denilson Baniwa and Isael Maxakali. And in 2013, when he organised the I Meeting of All Peoples (I Encontro de Todos os Povos), he became the central figure in the consolidation of contemporary indigenous art in Brazil, acting as an artist, curator, writer, educator, activist and cultural producer.

In his paintings, texts and installations, he sought to popularise the history and traditions of the indigenous peoples through contemporary art and preserve the ancestral cultural heritage which is being lost due to violence, discrimination and threats to landowning.

According to the art critic Leandro Muniz, indigenous imagery and aesthetics are at the basis of Jaider Esbell's work. But in addition to transposing these elements to Western techniques, his paintings reflect Macuxi's ways of thinking in the way they are constructed with superimposed layers, with elements of the past, the present and the future, showing time "as the simultaneity and interaction between the subjective and social, magical and political, a transit between worlds".

He had his first solo exhibitions in Normandia and Boa Vista in 2011, and later at the Gustavo Schnoor Gallery of the Rio de Janeiro State University, the Arts Center of the Federal University of Amazonas, the Memorial dos Povos Indígenas, Sesc in Boa Vista and the Millan Gallery in São Paulo. He participated in group exhibitions that took place at Barbara Hinshaw Gallery (Grove House, US), Espace Philippe Noiret (France), Paço das Artes, the Arts Center of the Fluminense Federal University, the Centro Cultural Banco do Brasil, the Art Museum of the Federal University of Paraná and the Pinacoteca do Estado de São Paulo.

In 2021, he became the highlight of the 34th São Paulo Art Biennial. He was the curator of an exhibition organized in the São Paulo Museum of Modern Art, parallel to the Biennial, titled "Moquém-Surarî: contemporary indigenous art", which brought together the works of indigenous artists from different peoples. He developed several art-education projects, published multiple books and articles, gave lectures at universities, and participated in debates and collective art actions.

He was the winner of the 2016 PIPA Prize and one of the nominees in the 2021 edition.

== Death ==
Jaider was found dead in his São Paulo apartment on November 2, 2021.
