= Macushi =

Indigenous people of Brazil

Makuusi
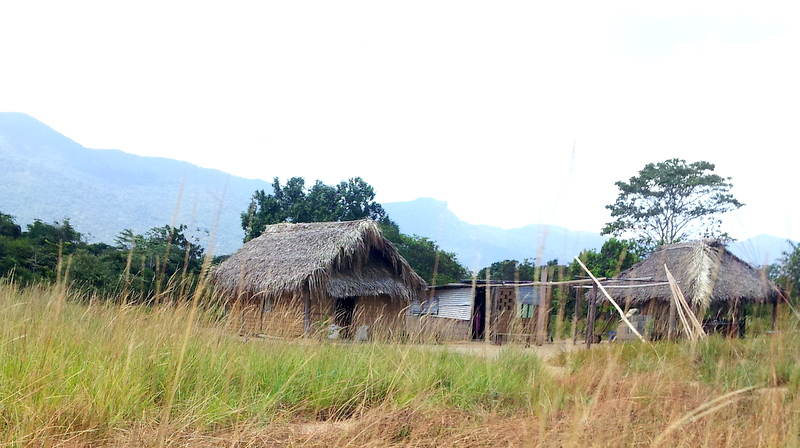
- Macushi village in Brazil

Total population
- 43,192

Regions with significant populations
- Brazil: 33,603 (2014)
- Guyana: 9,500 (2011)
- Venezuela: 89 (2011)

Languages
- Macushi, Portuguese, English and Spanish

Religion
- Indigenous religion, Roman Catholicism

The Macushi (Makuusi, Portuguese: Macuxi) are an Indigenous people living in the borderlands of southern Guyana, northern Brazil in the state of Roraima, and in an eastern part of Venezuela.

== Identification ==
The Macushi are also known as the Macusi, Macussi, Makushi, Makusi, Makuxi, Teueia, and Teweya people. Macushi, as well as the Arecuna, Kamarakoto, and Taurepan are considered sub-groups of Pemon.

== Language ==
Macushi people speak the Macushi language, a Macushi-Kapon language, which is part of the Carib language family. Some in Brazil also speak Portuguese, while some in Venezuela speak Spanish, and some in Guyana speak English. The Macushi language is written in the Latin script, and the New Testament was translated into the language in 1996.

Macushi were hesitant to teach their language to outsiders, thus the language was threatened in the 1950s, as it was considered "slang" compared to the official Portuguese.

== Housing and lifestyle ==
They live in villages linked together by tracks and paths, with houses built round a central courtyard. When married, the Macushi couple lives in the wife's family's village and the father-in-law is of great importance in Macushi kinship.

Macushi practice hunting and agriculture methods such as shifting cultivation and fish-poisoning.

Similar to other Indigenous groups in the area, Macushi traditional life relies a great deal on the bitter cassava, and cultivation tasks are divided by gender. Men traditionally clear the land and women tend and harvest. In Macushi lore, cassava was created for cultivation purpose and is overseen by a Cassava Mother (kisera yan). Women are the main processors, and the main products are cassava bread, farine, parakari, wo (drink), starch tapioca, and casereep. Village status is correlated to success in cassava farming.

== History and culture ==
Macushi oral history describes them as descendants of the sun's children, the benevolent Insikiran (Inshkirung) and his malevolent brother Makunaima (or Negi) who created fire, as well as diseases, and they also believe they discovered Washacá, the Tree of Life. The Macushi believe in the life principle – stkaton – and they believe it comes from the sun. Similar to other Amerindian groups (such as Patamona or Akawaio people) is the importance of the piaiman, a medicine-man or spiritual leader and belief in keinaimi (kanaima), a type of evil spirit that is personified as an "outsider" that brings death and misfortune. Kanaima have been associated with shape-shifting (usually animals such as jaguars, bats, or armadillos) and attacks are often directed at individuals when they are alone, in which they would be assaulted and die some days later. Another use of the term applies spiritual context to stealth, assassin-like tactics as a form of protection, but can come back to harm the beneficiaries as well.

The earliest recorded mentions of Macushi was in 1740 in context of Luso-Brazilian slave raids led by Irishman Lourenço Belforte. From the 1700s to the late 1800s, the Macushi were pushed north by Portuguese and Brazilian raids, and south by Caribs and Akawaio proxies for the Dutch and English, limiting the extent of their lands to the Rupununi Savannah. While there are reports of Macushi selling their own into slavery, it has also been noted that this was done under duress. In the 1800s, Macushis "specialized in producing hammocks, various crafts, and a potent form of curare" which were traded among other Amerindian groups in the region often for cassava graters and blow-pipes.

Prior to European colonization, Macushi were semi-nomadic, but permanent settlements have since formed usually around Catholic or Anglican missions or government-built schools. By the 1900s, many Macushi worked as laborers doing balata-bleeding or cattle-ranching. Brazilian Indigenous policies have had a more visibly significant effect on Macushi culture compared to the Guyana side, which on the most part had been to leave them alone.

=== Brazil ===
During the 18th century in Brazil, non-native people occupied Macushi territory, establishing mission villages and farms and forcing Macushi people to relocate.

The Brazilian Government have set up schools, as well as hospitals for the Macushi and since 2005 they are campaigning for land rights to be recognized throughout Brazil. Macushi are the largest Indigenous group in the Roraima, and make up a segment of the population of Boa Vista. Raposa Serra do Sol is a recognized Indigenous area of the Macushi.

=== Guyana ===
In Guyana, the Macushi settled in the Northern Rupununi Savannah. Cuthbert Cary-Elwes, a Jesuit missionary settled among the Macushi of the Rupununi Region (Guyana) in 1909, learned the language and stayed with them for more than 23 years. The Iwokrama International Centre is managed by Macushi and the villages of Annai, Kwatamang, Surama, Rewa, Crash Water, Karasabai and Yupukari are considered Macushi settlements. In the southern Rupununi, St. Ignatius and Moco-Moco also Macushi settlements.

The Rupununi Uprising which was led by prominent European and Amerindian ranching families, covered much of the traditional Macushi territory and many Macushi were also killed.

== Notable people ==
- Sydney Allicock (~1954), Guyanese Vice-President.
- Alister Charlie, (born 1977 or 1978), Guyanese politician
- Jaider Esbell (1979-2021), Brazilian artist, activist, author
- Bernaldina José Pedro (1945–2020), Brazilian activist and tribal leader.
