= Kaposmérő =

- Village
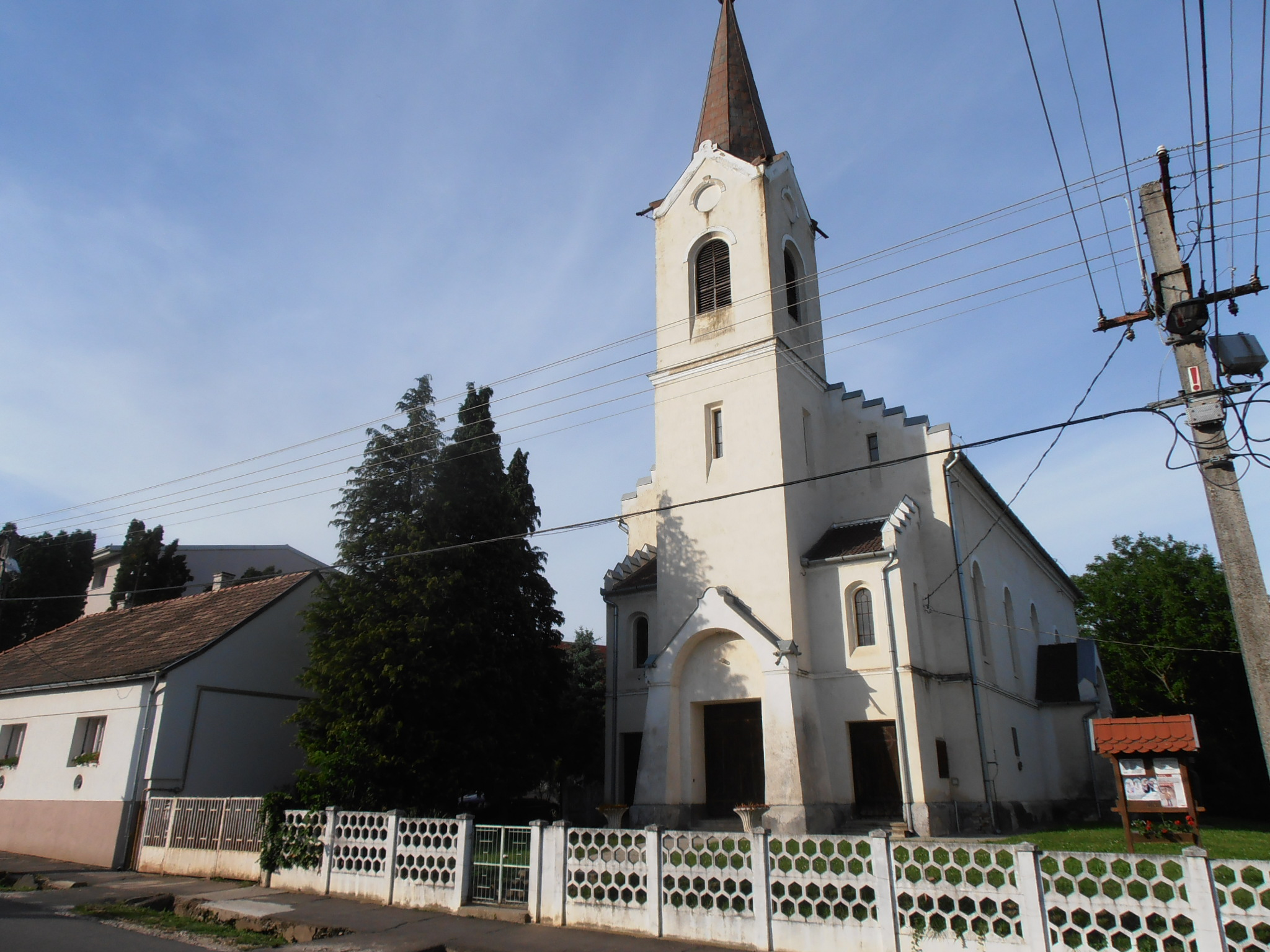
- Reformed Church of Kaposmérő

- Coat of arms

- Location of Somogy county in Hungary

- Location of Kaposmérő
- Coordinates: 46.36011°N 17.70243°E
- Country: Hungary
- Region: Southern Transdanubia
- County: Somogy
- District: Kaposvár
- RC Diocese: Kaposvár

Area
  - Total: 13.98 km^{2} (5.40 sq mi)

Population (2017)
  - Total: 2,448
  - Density: 175.1/km^{2} (453.5/sq mi)
- Demonym(s): mérői, kaposmérői
- Time zone: UTC+1 (CET)
  - Summer (DST): UTC+2 (CEST)
- Postal code: 7521
- Area code: (+36) 82
- NUTS 3 code: HU232
- MP: Attila Gelencsér (Fidesz)
- Website: Kaposmérő Online

Kaposmérő is a village in Somogy county, Hungary.
