= Sydney Allicock =

Guyanese politician

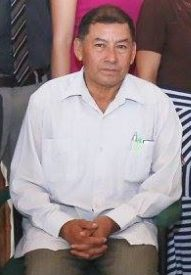
- Allicock in 2016

Vice President of Guyana
- In office May 2015 – August 2020
- President: David A. Granger

Minister of Indigenous Peoples' Affairs
- In office May 2015 – August 2020
- Succeeded by: Pauline Campbell-Sukhai

Toshao of Annai
- In office 1989–1994

Personal details
- Born: Sydney Charles Allicock c. 1954 North Rupununi, Upper Takutu-Upper Essequibo, British Guiana
- Party: Guyana Action Party (since 2001)
- Other political affiliations: People's National Congress (1989-2001)
- Occupation: Politician

Sydney Charles Allicock (born c.1954) is a Guyanese politician. He was minister of Indigenous People's Affairs in Guyana from 2015-2020, and was vice-president of Guyana from 2015-2020.

== Career ==
Allicock was born in North Rupununi, Upper Takutu-Upper Essequibo region. He was elected Toshao (chief) of the Annai, in Region No. Nine, the North Rupununi in 1989. He is currently the chairman of the North Rupununi District Development Board.

His father was one of the founders of the Iwokrama International Centre for Rain Forest Conservation and Development and Allicock has been one of the key tutors in their training program.

He pioneered Amerindian Heritage Day, which was later adopted as a national event.

From May 2015 to August 2020, he served as Minister of Indigenous Peoples' Affairs and one of the vice presidents in the cabinet of David A. Granger representing the Guyana Action Party.

== Recognition ==
In 2010, Allicock was the recipient of the Anthony N. Sabga Caribbean Awards for Excellence for his public service work.

He received the Responsible Tourism Showcase Award from the US Educational Travel Conference, New Orleans, in 2009.

In 2020, Sydney Allicock Highway was commissioned and named in his honor. The highway runs through the Rupununi, starting from Central Lethem and running through Hiawa, Nappi and Parashara.
