= Kwitaro River =

Coordinates: 3.2545°N 58.7871°W

Location
- Country: Guyana

Physical characteristics
- Mouth

The Kwitaro River is a tributary of the Rupununi River in Guyana.

The Kwitaro is a part of the Rewa River Basin, which is a tributary of the Rupununi River in the larger Essequibo drainage system and within Upper Takutu-Upper Essequibo. It lies at approximately 120 m. elevation. River depth is highly variable, and water level by altimetry varies from a low of 86.53 m. to a high of 94.28 m.; averaging 89.30 m.

Vegetation is lowland seasonally inundated and terra firma evergreen tropical forest.

The Kwitaro breaks off into Pobawau Creek (3º16’3.1”N, 58º46’42.7”W). Cacique Mountain (3º11’29.5”N, 58º48’42.0”W) is 10 km. southwest of Pobawau Creek.

== Economy and Settlement ==
The area is mostly untouched, but has had human impact evidenced from slashes on balata trees that indicate bleeding for latex. Mining, usually in the form of dredging, is prohibited. It is an important waterway for Wapishana people.

Amerindian villages that are a part of the Kwitaro River ecosystem include Aishalton, Awarewaunau, Maruranau and Shea.

== See also ==
- List of rivers of Guyana
