= Rewa, Guyana =

Amerindian village in Upper Takutu-Upper Essequibo, Guyana

Rewa
- village
- Location in Guyana
- Coordinates: 3.8816°N 58.8070°W
- Country: Guyana
- Region: Upper Takutu-Upper Essequibo

Government
  - Senior Councilor: Daniel Haynes

Area
  - Total: 479 km^{2} (184.8 sq mi)

Population (2012)
  - Total: 237

Rewa is an Amerindian village in the Upper Takutu-Upper Essequibo region of Guyana.

== Overview ==
Rewa is a satellite village to Massara and received its land title in 2008. It is situated on the left bank of the Rupununi River at the confluence of the Rewa River. It is also in proximity to Awarmie Mountain and near the western border of Brazil. Languages spoken in the village include Macushi and Wapishana. Economic activities of the village include subsistence farming, fishing, small grocery shops, and an eco lodge which opened in 2005. Public services include a primary school and health post.

In 2014, Rewa applied for an extension to their land grant to prevent damage to the surrounding environment due to commercial logging.

Annai Village is the next closest town and the regional center.

== History ==
The name “Rewa” comes from the Wapichan word for a tree called the iliwa tree. Between the 1940s and '50s, the Booker Brothers, McConnell and Company came to the area and introduced bleeding batata from the bullet wood tree, attracting people to work in the area through the 1970s until the industry dried up. Two men were involved in this operation: George William and Nicolas Edwards. Edwards and his family moved to the area in 1975, becoming the first family of the village. As the main village of Massara expanded, many residents moved to Rewa.

In the dry season of 2015, assisted efforts of the Iwokrama International Centre for Rain Forest Conservation and Development to rescue and relocate 27 arapaima, a highly endangered species that has been subject to extreme overfishing. Stephanu Honorio from the Rewa Village Council, is a trained specialist in arapaima relocation.

Rewa Eco-Lodge was awarded Most Outstanding Community-led and Owned Tourism Enterprise by the Guyana Tourism Authority in 2018.

In 2020, Rovin Alvin, a Rewa native, was a guide for Gordon Ramsay in an episode of Gordon Ramsay: Uncharted, which features cuisines of remote and indigenous communities around the world. The episode featured traditional Amerindian foods made with cassava, Spectacled caiman, black piranha, arowana, and goliath birdeater as well as Ramsey recreating Guyanese pepperpot.
