= Taruma =

Taruma may refer to:

- Tarumã, city in São Paulo, Brazil
- Taruma language, indigenous language of Brazil
- Taruma people, indigenous people of Brazil, Guyana and Suriname
- Tarumanagara, Java
- Vitex montevidensis, commonly called tarumã
