= Achiwib =

- Village
- Location in Guyana
- Coordinates: 2°18′N 59°35′W
- Country: Guyana
- Region: Upper Takutu-Upper Essequibo

Government
  - Toshao: Sidwell Johnson (2012-)

Area
  - Total: 167 sq mi (430 km^{2})

Population (2012)
  - Total: 586

Achiwib is a village in the Upper Takutu-Upper Essequibo Region of far southern Guyana. Achiwib (alternate spellings: Achawib, Achiwuib) is an Amerindian community that borders Brazil, the main language spoken in the village is Wapishana language.

== Overview ==
Achiwib is named after wild garlic which is plentiful around the settlement. The village was founded by Atorad and its sub-tribes. Macushi and Wapishana later joined the village. In 1842, Achiwib was visited by Moritz Richard Schomburgk.

In 2017, the Government of Guyana partnered with the Brazilian Army to drill wells in the communities of Achiwib and Baishaidrun to provide access to potable water following the installation of distribution networks by GWI in collaboration with community members.

The major economic activity in the area is subsistence farming. The village is served by a health post. It has a nursery and a primary school, which also served the satellite village of Baishaidrun (Bashaizon) until a school was built there in 2019. Projects for providing internet access and solar lights have been initiated since 2019.

Nearby villages include Aishalton, which is the administrative center of the deep south area.
