= Wowetta =

- Village
- Location in Guyana
- Coordinates: 3°57′N 59°08′W
- Country: Guyana
- Region: Upper Takutu-Upper Essequibo

Government
  - Toshao: Mark George (2012)

Population (2012)
  - Total: 332
- Time zone: UTC-4 (GYT (Guyana Time))

Wowetta is an Indigenous village in the Upper Takutu-Upper Essequibo Region in Guyana. The village is mainly inhabited by Macushi people.

The village had a population of 332 inhabitants according to the 2012 census. The village got its meaning as "get soft" that dates back to historic time. The people depend on subsistence farming and use of natural resources to sustain their livelihood. The men predominantly go hunting, fishing, and gather non-timber forest products for their families on a seasonal basis.

== Geography ==
Wowetta is surrounded by the Pakaraima Mountains and Makarapan Mountain to the east, range of the Kanuku Mountains that divides the Rupununi savannah in half, creating the North Rupununi Savannah that is predominantly occupied by the Macushi people, and the South Rupununi Savannah that is occupied by the Wapishana people and the Wai-wai people. The village is surrounded by pristine tropical rainforest and is one of the villages that border the Iwokrama International Rainforest Protected area. The people of the North Rupununi have all rights to continue their traditional rights, such as hunting as well as gathering non-timber forest Products in the Protected area. There is a signed Community Management Agreement (CMA) between Iwokrama and a standing Memorandum of Understanding (MOU) to be signed with the North Rupununi District Development Board (NRDDB). Additionally, the village benefits from a 15% paid to the NRDDB as forest users’ fee that is used for the further development of the various villages that surround that area. As such Wowetta is a member of the North Rupununi District Development Board that is bisected by the Georgetown to Lethem highway.

== Population ==
The people speak predominantly Macushi language as their first language, and English as their second language. Their main staple foods are cassava bread, farine and pepper pot. The men are skilled craftsmen who produce crafts that the women use to process the various by-product of the cassava. The men also practice traditional hunting, using bows and arrows, and traditional traps. The fish using line and hook, traps, and poisoning of small waterways. The homes are made of adobe wall and thatched roofs from the kokarite palm. Women engage in cotton weaving, making slings and hammocks.

The people rely heavily on their agricultural products as well as their handicrafts to earn their income. The average household income that a household earns per month is about $5,000 (25 USD) per month. The village has a number of projects that contribute to income generation, some of which are ecotourism, farine production, a village shop, vegetable garden, and a youth joinery project. These earn a small percentage of income generated from revenues paid for the use of resources, such as non-timber forest products and timber. These projects employ about 10% of the residents and the remainder go out into the gold mines, and often seasonally migrate to Brazil. Additionally, some of the villagers practice small scale forestry to support their families.

== Politics ==
Wowetta is located in the Upper Takutu-Upper Essequibo Region 9, approximately 450 km South of the capital city, Georgetown. It is a satellite village to Annai, and is governed by a Village Council along with four other villages, Surama, Kwatamang, Rupertee, and Annai. These five villages hold one land title with a population of 1,500 people (2006 census) with a total land area of 188,000 km^{2}, and falls under the administration of the Ministry of Amerindian Affairs, Georgetown, and the Regional Democratic Council.

The Village Council of Wowetta ensures that the people are adequately represented based on issues affecting individuals. The village Council is mandated to manage natural resources on communal land and to develop rules and regulations that control the use by outsiders. The village council holds its statutory meetings on a quarterly basis. At these meetings persons are given the opportunity to raise issues, as well as an update of the village operation. The issues of individual are noted and taken on board at various levels. The village council consists of seven Councillors, headed by a Toshao (Chief), and has a three term in office before they are replaced or re-elected.

Additionally, the development of the Linden-Lethem road link will contribute to positive and negative development for the people, hence there is need to resolve the problem in order to prepare the people for the imminent changes that will emerge with the various developments.

== History ==
Wowetta is located about 7 miles to the northeast of Annai. The local Macushi name is aweta nî pî which means "get soft", but the non-Macushi corrupted the name to Wowetta. The first people to settle here were the Payako. Almost all were all wiped out by a terrible sickness – fever, vomiting and diarrhoea – which led to the severe dehydration and death in the early 1960s. The survivors moved away to the riverain locations like Makapa, Crash Water and Rewa. From that time the place was named Aweta, since the sickness made the people's flesh ‘get soft’, putrid.

After that, other Payako came from the south Pakaraima to settle in this place. They traded parrots, beads and earthen pots with the Arekuna who came from far off Roraima, receiving in exchange files, cutlasses and cloth. The Caribs came to hear of this trade and waged war on the Macushi Payako. Out of envy, the Caribs killed all the men and took away the women. The few survivors had to flee, leaving the Caribs in possession of these lands. The Payako sought help from the Arekuna of Roraima, returning to battle the Caribs.

The Caribs had firearms but the Arekuna and Macushi used their clubs, taike. There was one pitched battle at Karanambo, others elsewhere. The other enemies of the Macushi were the Brazilians who also captured Macushi women and took them away.

As a result of their alliances to fight the Caribs, the resulting people of the Annai area are a mixture of Arekuna and Payako Macushi. Their tactics involved setting the Caribs camps alight during the night. Over time they succeeded in chasing the Caribs north of the coast where they can be found to this day.

== Economy ==
Wowetta has a number of economic activities that assist the village generate income, such as eco-tourism, agricultural processing and activities.

=== Tourism ===
Eco-tourism helps to promote the conservation of natural resources as well as help to gather information on the existence of other natural resources that can be managed by the community. Wowetta has a unique by-product that is a tourist attraction, the Guianan Cock-of-the-Rock (Rupicola rupicola). When visitors visit the site they observe the mating rituals of the male and female birds.

=== Agro-processing ===
Cassava has been cultivated by the Macushis and Wapishana for centuries. They produce their staple food by processing the cassava into end products of Cassava bread, farine, cassareep and tapioca. This is their main meal, with fish or meat.

The women's group of Wowetta has started to process cassava into large quantities that is supplied to the Ministry of Amerindian Affairs as part of its relief program to help the problem of flood affected villages. The processing takes the effort of a number of women who are engaged in processing, such as the initial harvesting to the final stage. This project is supported by a mill that makes it somewhat less labor-intensive. The processing requires harvesting the cassava, and soaking the cassava for four days, while the women return to their farm to harvest fresh bitter cassava. When it is transported to the processing site, the women scrape the skin outside of the cassava. The peeled cassava is then washed and placed into the cassava mill. In 2018, a factory was opened for milling farine.
