= Astrothelium lucidostromum =

Scientific classification
- Kingdom: Fungi
- Division: Ascomycota
- Class: Dothideomycetes
- Order: Trypetheliales
- Family: Trypetheliaceae
- Genus: Astrothelium
- Species: A. lucidostromum

Binomial name
- Astrothelium lucidostromum Aptroot (2016)

Species of lichen

Astrothelium lucidostromum is a species of corticolous (bark-dwelling) lichen in the family Trypetheliaceae. Found in Guyana, it was formally described as a new species in 2016 by Dutch lichenologist André Aptroot. The type specimen was collected by Harrie Sipman about 45 km (28 miles) south of Aishalton (Upper Takutu-Upper Essequibo) at an altitude of 230 m (750 ft); there, it was found in a savanna forest growing on smooth tree bark.

The lichen has a smooth and somewhat shiny, pale yellowish-grey thallus with a cortex but lacking a prothallus, which covers areas of up to 7 cm (2.8 in) in diameter. The presence of the lichen does not induce the formation of galls in the host plant. The pseudostromata contains lichexanthone, a lichen product that causes that structure to fluoresce when lit with a long-wavelength UV light.

The main characteristics of the lichen distinguishing it from others in Astrothelium are the UV+ pseudostroma; the fused ascomata; and the immersed pseudostroma that have a white cover (contrasting with the thallus colour). Astrothelium eustomuralis is a similar species, but in that species, lichexanthone only occurs in the ostiole, not the entire pseudostroma.
