= Pyrenula perfecta =

Scientific classification
- Kingdom: Fungi
- Division: Ascomycota
- Class: Eurotiomycetes
- Order: Pyrenulales
- Family: Pyrenulaceae
- Genus: Pyrenula
- Species: P. perfecta

Binomial name
- Pyrenula perfecta Aptroot & Sipman (2013)
- Holotype: southern Rupununi savannah, Guyana

Species of lichen-forming fungus

Pyrenula perfecta is a species of corticolous (bark-dwelling) crustose lichen in the family Pyrenulaceae. The species forms an extremely thin yellowish-gray crust on smooth bark and produces tiny hemispherical fruiting bodies 0.3–0.6 mm across with relatively large ascospores measuring 30–35 micrometres in length. It is known only from its type locality in scrubland along a creek in the southern Rupununi savannah of Guyana.

== Taxonomy ==
This species was described as new by André Aptroot and Harrie Sipman in 2013. The holotype was gathered by Sipman from the Arakwai outpost in the Dadanawa Ranch, located in the Upper Takutu District, Guyana; in this location in the southern Rupununi savannah, it was collected from scrub along a creek.

== Description ==
This species has an extremely thin, yellow‑gray thallus that lacks pseudocyphellae and a border. Its fruiting bodies (perithecia) are superficial and hemispherical, 0.3–0.6 mm in diameter, and remain simple rather than fusing. Each has a brown apical pore. The hamathecium is clear and contains no oil droplets. Each ascus bears eight ascospores arranged in two uneven rows. The spores have three cross‑walls and are relatively large, 30–35 μm long and 13–16 μm wide. In young spores the internal cavities are elongated and nearly merge into a single band; with maturity the cavities are separated by dark lines of spore wall material. A thickened inner wall is present at the tips. No asexual structures or lichen substances have been observed.

== Habitat and distribution ==
At the time of its original description, Pyrenula perfecta was known only from the type locality, where it grows on smooth bark in montane forest. No additional location were reported by Aptroot in his 2021 world key to the genus Pyrenula.

== See also ==
- List of Pyrenula species
