= Aishalton =

- Amerindian Village
- Location in Guyana
- Coordinates: 2°31′N 59°15′W
- Country: Guyana
- Region: Upper Takutu-Upper Essequibo
- Sub-section: South/Deep South

Government
  - Toshao: Bernard Conrad (2012)

Area
  - Total: 166 sq mi (430 km^{2})
- Elevation: 614 ft (187 m)

Population (2012)
  - Total: 1,069
  - Ethnicities: Wapishana

Aishalton is an Amerindian village that is situated in the Rupununi savannah of southern Guyana, in the Upper Takutu-Upper Essequibo Region (Region 9) of the country.

It is the administrative centre for the southern sub-district of Region 9. In 2012, an official census recorded a population of 1,069 people in Aishalton, making it the third most highly populated village in Region 9 (after St. Ignatius and Lethem), and the most populated village in the southern sub-district.

== History ==
=== Archaeology and the Aishalton Petroglyphs ===
Makatau mountain, which is situated approximately 3 km outside Aishalton village, is one of Guyana's most well-known archaeological sites. It is particularly well known for the numerous petroglyphs (known locally as "timehri") that are found on Makatau and on rock-formations in the surrounding area. In the 1970s, the Guyanese anthropologist, Denis Williams, undertook a detailed archaeological study of the area. His research uncovered 686 petroglyphs (known as the "Aishalton Petroglyphs") that are mainly representations of humans, animals and plants as well as geometric arrangements. Williams estimated the date of the petroglyphs at 3000–5000 BCE, and described them as belonging to a specific "type" of petroglyph—subsequently referred to as the "Aishalton type"—that is defined by a distinctively figurative style. Williams also discovered 84 stone tools that had been used in the carving of the petroglyphs. They were the first tools of this kind to be found in Guyana.

== Location ==
Aishalton village is located in the Rupununi savannah lands in the South of Guyana, at an altitude of 187 metres. Neighbouring villages are Karaudarnau to the west and Awarewaunau to the east. Lethem, the regional capital of the Upper Takutu-Upper Essequibo region, is situated 180 km north west of Aishalton; and Dadanawa Ranch is located approximately halfway between these two centres.

=== Transport ===
The main transport route between Aishalton and the Guyana coastlands (the most populated region of Guyana, and the home of the country's capital, Georgetown) is the unpaved Linden-Lethem Road. From Lethem, travelers use private vehicles to traverse the 180 km dirt track between Lethem and Aishalton. Up until 2008, the Rupununi River Bridge at Katoonarib afforded a crossing-point between Aishalton and Lethem. In 2008 however, the bridge—which cost 16 million Guyanese dollars to construct—collapsed. In the 1990s an Airplane landing strip was built in Aishalton. The IATA airport code of the Aishalton Airport is AHL.

== Services and facilities ==
Aishalton is served by a Rural Library Centre that was established in 1976 as part of the National Library of Guyana's expansion of its rural library service.

Aishalton District Hospital was founded in 1982, and it is the only hospital in the southern sub-section of Region 9. It serves over seven villages, with between 20 and 40 outpatients being treated on a daily basis, and approximately 20 patients admitted every month. It has a staff-force of around 18 people. According to a report in Stabroek News that was based on interviews with hospital staff members, Aishalton District Hospital suffers from limited resources and a number of other problems. The supply of electricity to the hospital has been limited to three hours per day since the hospital generator provided by Remote Area Medical ceased to work in 2008. Hospital staff also reported an inadequate supply of water, and insufficient staffing. Patients with serious conditions have to be transferred to hospitals in either Lethem or Georgetown, but the hospital also struggles with a lack of transportation and reliable transport routes.

Aishalton has both primary school and secondary schools. Aishalton Secondary School was established in 1999, and serves the six villages of the South sub-section of Region 9. In 2009, the secondary school was reported to be suffering from overcrowding.

An internet service was introduced in the village in the 1990s. Prior to the introduction of internet, communications facilities in Aishalton were limited to radio as there is no telephone service in the village or the surrounding area.

== Population and culture ==
The population of Aishalton is predominantly Wapishana Amerindian. The last remaining Taruma speakers are also located in the area.

The main religion in the village is Christianity, with the majority of inhabitants identifying as Roman Catholics and smaller numbers as Pentecostal Christians, Seventh-day Adventists and Anglicans. A very small number of people belong to Hindu and Muslim faiths. The principal economic activities in the village are farming, fishing, and forestry.

Every year, Aishalton takes part in the August Games—a sporting festival for the six villages of the South sub-section of Region 9, which was inaugurated in 1995. The games involve football, softball cricket and volleyball competitions. On the last day of the games a number of competitions are held to celebrate the Wapishana way of life, including traditional Wapishana activities such as cassava-grating and ant-stinging.

Local cuisine is reflective of traditional Wapishana culture. Cassava is the main staple that is used in cooking, and is used to make cassava bread, a marinating sauce called cassareep, farine (similar to cous-cous), and an alcoholic drink called parakari. The production of parakari involves a complicated process with thirty different stages, and the use of a sophisticated fermentation technology. The fermentation of parakari involves the use of an amylolytic mold (Rhizopus), and it is the only known fermented drink to be produced by the indigenous peoples of the Americas that involves the use of an amylolytic process.
