= Yupukari =

- Village
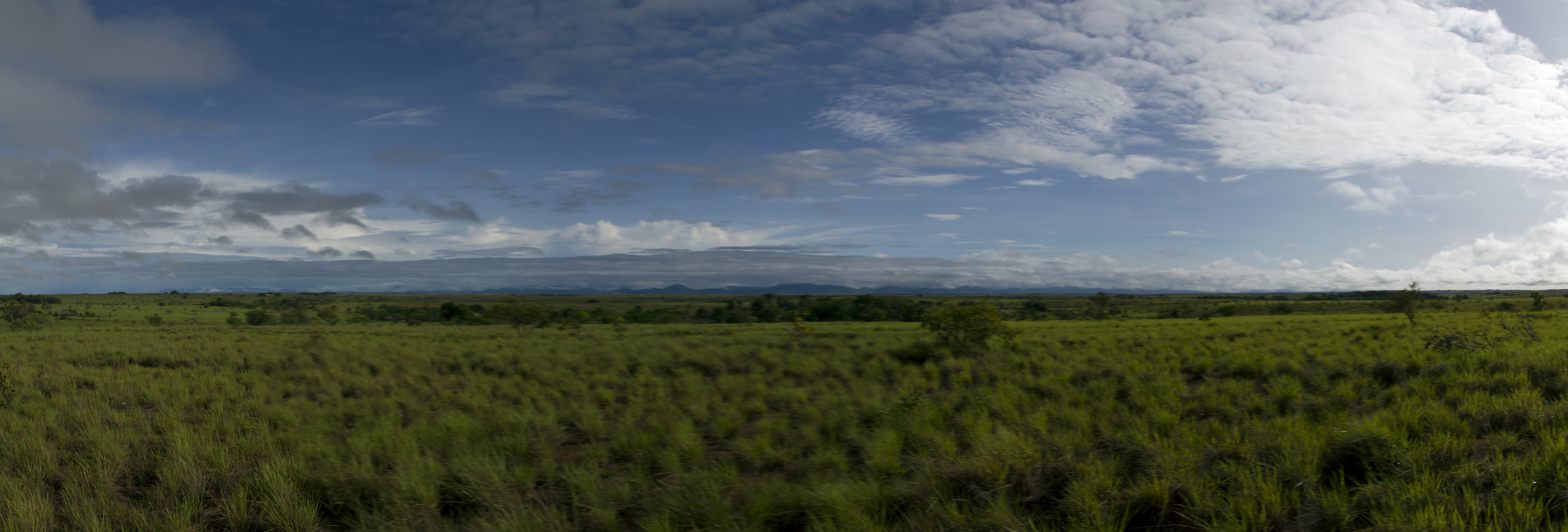
- Panorama at Yupukari

- Location in Guyana
- Coordinates: 3.6618°N 59.3557°W
- Country: Guyana
- Region: Upper Takutu-Upper Essequibo

Government
  - Toshao: Rudolph Roberts Senior

Population (2012)
  - Total: 548

Yupukari (also: Eupukari) is an Indigenous village of Macushi and Wapishana Amerindians in the Upper Takutu-Upper Essequibo Region of Guyana. It is located between the Kanuku and Pakaraima Mountains along the Rupununi River.

== Overview ==
Around the start of the 20th century, Yupukari was founded as an Anglican mission called Saint Mary’s Anglican Mission.

Yupukari has a school, and a health clinic. The village is connected to Lethem by road. The economy is based on subsistence farming, hunting, fishing and tourism. The Caiman House Eco Lodge is located in the village. Free Wi-Fi has been made available for the village.

== Nature ==
Yupukari is known for the great variety of butterflies who visit the region. The Yupukari Wildlife Club has constructed a community butterfly farm in the village. Yupukari is also home to river turtles. Arrau turtles (Podocnemis expansa) and yellow-spotted river turtles (Podocnemis unifilis) can be found near the village.
