= Astrothelium mediocrassum =

Scientific classification
- Kingdom: Fungi
- Division: Ascomycota
- Class: Dothideomycetes
- Order: Trypetheliales
- Family: Trypetheliaceae
- Genus: Astrothelium
- Species: A. mediocrassum

Binomial name
- Astrothelium mediocrassum Aptroot (2016)

Species of lichen

Astrothelium mediocrassum is a species of corticolous (bark-dwelling), crustose lichen in the family Trypetheliaceae. Found in Guyana, it was formally described as a new species in 2016 by Dutch lichenologist André Aptroot. The type specimen was collected by Harrie Sipman south of the Kuyuwini Landing (about 45 kilometres (28 mi) south of Aishalton, Upper Takutu District) at an altitude of 230 m (750 ft). The lichen has a somewhat shiny, smooth, pale green thallus that covers an area of up to 12 cm (4.7 in) in diameter. Its ascospores are hyaline, spindle-shaped (fusiform), and muriform (i.e., divided into internal chambers by transverse and longitudinal septa), with dimensions of 70–80 by 22–25 μm. This is the smallest ascospore size of Astrothelia species. The middle, or median, septum of the spore is thickened in comparison with the others. No lichen products were detected using thin-layer chromatography. It is somewhat similar in appearance to Astrothelium octosporum, but that species has lichexanthone in its thallus and pseudostromata.
