= Sawariwau =

Sawariwau Sawari Wa'o
- Village
- Location in Guyana
- Coordinates: 2.6732°N 59.6537°W
- Country: Guyana
- Region: Upper Takutu-Upper Essequibo

Government
  - Toshao: Gregory Thomas

Population (2017)
  - Total: 521

Sawariwau (Wapishana: Sawari Wa'o) is a village in the Upper Takutu-Upper Essequibo Region of Guyana. Sawariwau is inhabited by Wapishana Amerindians. It is located about 70 miles (110 km) south of Lethem in the Rupununi savannah. The main language spoken in the village is Wapishana.

== History ==
The name of the village translates to grandfather spirit of fishes. Sawariwau was founded by chief Suubau, and is one of the oldest Wapishana villages. Father Cuthbert Cary-Elwes, SJ was the first missionary to arrive in the village, and a church was constructed in 1919.

Katoonarib used to be a satellite of Sawariwau, but has become independent. Sawariwau was in a Neighbourhood Democratic Council (municipality) with Ireng and Lethem, however the municipality was dissolved in 2012. The village is again governed by a Toshao (village chief) with 11 councillors. In 2013, the land was demarcated, however as of 2017, the demarcation is still in dispute.

== Overview ==
The economy is based on subsistence farming and cattle ranching. The village has a primary school, a secondary school, a health centre, and a community centre. Internet connection is provided via free Wi-Fi. Digicel has installed a communication mast in the village. The village depends on rain water for drinking. There is no electricity other than private diesel generators and solar panels.
