= Peanut production in Guyana =

Peanut production in Guyana plays an important role in some areas of the country. In the remote Rupununi region of Guyana, peanut farming dominates the local economy and farmers depend upon the crop as their main source of income. Recent agricultural developments have enhanced production from 1,100 pounds per acre to over 2,500 in four years. As a result of increasing yields Guyanese farmers have not only benefited from local markets in Guyana but have increasingly seen the export of Guyanese peanuts in the Caribbean market.

== Cultivars ==
Runner-type varieties include Florunner, Guyana Jumbo, and C99R. Spanish-type include AK 62, GN 94-A2, and Basanti.

== Production ==
273 metrics tonnes of peanuts were produced in 2018.

In 2005, a peanut butter factory was built by Amerindian women in the Aranaputa village of North Rupununi with the support of various agencies. The Aranaputa Processors Friendly Society produced snacks for the regional school district, but their success was hampered by competition from cheap peanut butter imported from China. Lower domestic demand has the village seeking ways to enter the international market with their peanut butter.

== Poisoning concerns ==
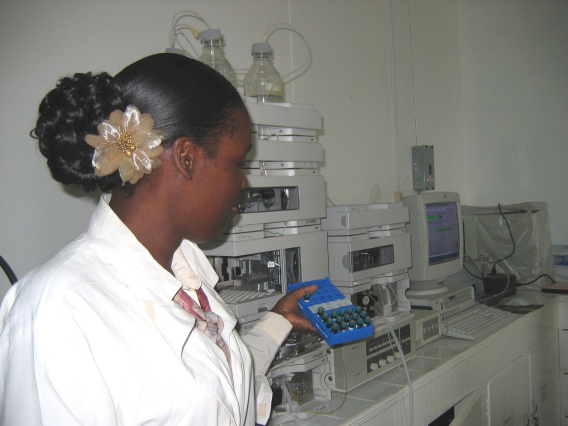
A technician at the Guyana Food and Drug Department Laboratory in Georgetown, Guyana selecting peanut samples to be tested with new equipment.

In Guyana, peanut exports have been notably affected by food safety concerns. In the Rupununi region in particular, the local peanut crop needs to be tested for aflatoxins, a group of carcinogenic toxins that occur in the soil. Guyanese farmers are obliged to comply with the Guyanese Food and Drug Department (FDD) and cannot sell peanuts unless they are certified as free of all aflatoxins. Current food safety testing and certification mechanisms cannot keep up with the increased demand for testing, leaving peanut harvests ineligible for export. USAID has been involved with the FDD in training specialists and technicians from the FDD, the University of Guyana, and private companies to improve peanut sampling testing in the country.
