= Maruranau =

Maruranau Marora Naawa
- Village
- Location in Guyana
- Coordinates: 2.7468°N 59.1599°W
- Country: Guyana
- Region: Upper Takutu-Upper Essequibo

Government
  - Toshao: Ambrose Bento (2021)

Area
  - Total: 282.61 km^{2} (109.118 sq mi)

Population (2012)
  - Total: 830
  - Density: 2.9/km^{2} (7.6/sq mi)

Maruranau (Wapishana: Marora Naawa; also: Maruranawa) is an Indigenous village of Wapishana Amerindians in the Upper Takutu-Upper Essequibo Region of Guyana. It is located in the Rupununi savannah near the Kwitaro River on the edge of the Kanuku Mountains. A minority of Taruma also inhabit the village.

== History ==
The Wapishana used to live in small settlements. They were concentrated in larger settlements by the Catholic missionaries. In 1919, it was decided by the village leadership and the priest to relocate 5 miles (8.0 km) north to the present location of Maruranau due to frequent flooding. The name of the village means "Giant Armadillo Hill".

== Overview ==
In October 1947 the first primary school was established in Maruranau. The village has a health centre and shops. There is no electricity, internet or mobile phone. In 2018, water wells were drilled as part of a joint exercise of the Guyana Defence Force and the Brazilian Army. The economy is mainly based on subsistence agriculture, ranching, hunting and fishing. Balata bleeding, a natural latex, used to be part of the economy. The main religions are the Catholic Church and the Open Brethren.

== Languages ==
Wapishana is the primary language in Maruranau, and English the secondary language. It is one of the few villages which has kept their language alive. Maruranau is also home to three speakers of the Taruma language. They were formerly regarded as its only speakers, but another family has since been discovered in Lethem.

== Transport ==
Maruranau can be reached by road from Lethem which takes about 4 hours by bus. The village can be accessed by air via the Maruranawa Airport.
