= Aishalton Airport =

Airport in Guyana

- IATA: AHL; ICAO: SYAH

Summary
- Serves: Aishalton
- Elevation AMSL: 591 ft / 180 m
- Coordinates: 2°28′20″N 59°19′20″W

Map
- Location in Guyana

Runways
Direction	Length		Surface
Direction	m	ft	Surface
06/24	915	3,002	Grass
- Sources: Google Maps GCM

Aishalton Airport (IATA: AHL, ICAO: SYAH) is an airport serving the village of Aishalton, in the Upper Takutu-Upper Essequibo Region of Guyana. Its only runway is a 915-meter grass surface.

== See also ==
- List of airports in Guyana
- Transport in Guyana
