= Karaudarnau =

Karaudarnau Lumid Pau
- Village
- Location in Guyana
- Coordinates: 2.4068°N 59.4589°W
- Country: Guyana
- Region: Upper Takutu-Upper Essequibo

Government
  - Toshao: Arnold Stephens

Area
  - Total: 453.32 km^{2} (175.03 sq mi)

Population
  - Total: 1,053
  - Density: 2.323/km^{2} (6.016/sq mi)

Karaudarnau (also Lumid Pau) is an Indigenous village of Wapishana Amerindians in the Upper Takutu-Upper Essequibo Region of Guyana. It is located in the Rupununi savannah on the Rupununi River.

== Name ==
The name Karaudarnau means "snake hill" in Wapishana and refers to a legend that a snake lives underneath the village. A big black rock in the centre of the village is claimed to be the head of the snake.

== Overview ==
Karaudarnau has a school, a health post, a community centre, and two churches. As of 2017, education is bilingual in Wapishana and English. The community has close links to the Brazilian Wapishana community who live in the Jacamim Indigenous Territory. The village has no access to the telephone network or internet,

Karaudarnau has been awarded a territory of 453.32 square kilometres (175.03 sq mi). There is a 2am curfew, and liquor has been banned in the community. In 2018, the village was given access to clean drinking water by a joint exercise of the Brazilian Army and the Guyana Defence Force. In May 2020, during the COVID-19 pandemic the community blocked access to the gold mine.

== Transport ==
The nearest town is Lethem which is accessible by road. Karaudarnau can also be reached from the Lumid Pau Airport.

== Economy ==
The economy of the village is based on livestock in particular cattle ranching and pig farming, agriculture, and industrial-scale gold mining at the Marudi Mountain by Romanex Guyana Exploration.
