= Rappu Falls =

Coordinates: 4°12′00″N 58°48′0″W

Rappu Falls is a waterfall on the Essequibo River, Guyana, approximately 17 km north of the confluence with the Rupununi River.

It is among a cluster of other cataracts that make traversing the upper Essequibo a challenge, including such as King William IV Falls, Ackramukra and Murray's cataract.

It is named for the particular type of bamboo that grows there, which is used for producing lanceolate arrows by the Wapishana and Macushi peoples. Using this bamboo has the effect of paralyzing the hunter's target.
