= Toka, Guyana =

Toka
- Village
- Location in Guyana
- Coordinates: 3.9115°N 59.3844°W
- Country: Guyana
- Region: Upper Takutu-Upper Essequibo

Government
  - Toshao: Micah Davis

Area
  - Total: 32 km^{2} (12.5 sq mi)

Population
  - Total: 207

Toka is an Indigenous village of Macushi Amerindians in the Upper Takutu-Upper Essequibo Region of Guyana. It is located in the North Rupununi Wetlands.

== Overview ==
The main language spoken in Toka is Macushi with English as a secondary language. The village has a primary school and a health care centre. In 2021, a water system was installed in the village. The economy is based on farming and trade. Internet connection is provided via free Wi-Fi.

In 1969, Toka was one of the villages which rebelled against the Burnham government in the Rupununi Uprising. The uprising was dispersed, and the village was set on fire by the Guyana Defence Force.

Toka is located on the Linden–Lethem road.
