= Cuthbert Cary-Elwes =

British missionary

Cuthbert Cary-Elwes (1 October 1867, Boulogne (France) - 22 August 1945, London) was an English Jesuit priest, itinerant missionary and founder of the Rupununi Mission, in South-Guyana.

== Youth and Formation ==
After studying at Downside Abbey and Stonyhurst College he joined the Society of Jesus on 7 September 1887. He followed the regular course of philosophical studies at St Mary’s Hall, Stonyhurst (1890-1893) and Theology with the French Jesuits, first at Jersey and then Lyons (1897–1901). He is ordained priest the 18 July 1900, in London.

== Missionary calling ==
Inspired by an uncle, missionary in South Africa, he writes in 1902 to the Superior General of the Jesuits, Luis Martin, offering to be sent to any mission land, China or ‘the wild Indians of Brazil’. The General leaves the decision to the local provincial who accedes to the desire of Cary-Elwes and sends him to British Guyana in 1904.

After three years in Georgetown, headquarter of the British colony, Cary-Elwes is finally sent to the interior of the country. He is stationed first at Morawhanna, at the border of Venezuela where he does catechism and pastoral work.

But a new mission is to be opened further south in Guyana, close to the Brazilian border. Cary-Elwes is chosen for the challenging task. In 1909 he travels through the Amazonian forest to reach the Takutu River. He is in Macushi and Wapishana territory, two Amerindian groups whose langue he learns. For two years he has to rely entirely on interpreters for communicating with them. But soon his progressive fluency in the languages allows him to make himself understood among the Patamona people who receive him well. He builds many simple houses and a few churches. Quite a few people receive baptism.

His pastoral area covers 300 square miles (780 km^{2}) through which he walks for hours and days, finding this more helpful for prayer: «without a real spirit of prayer my life as a missionary would be impossible». Once he had mastered the Makushi language he used to sit long hours into the night, surrounded by men, women and children, talking, singing and instructing them in an informal way. Rupununi people called him ‘Little padre’, an affectionate title.

== Return to England ==
In January 1923, struck by a severe mental breakdown that left him disoriented in the forest for several weeks he was taken back to Georgetown and repatriated to England. He recovered fairly well, but a return to Guyana was deemed unthinkable. His Rupununi congregation of Christians kept on asking news about his ’Little padre’ but Cary-Elwes had to remain in England.

For another 20 years he gave lectures, missions and retreats, and published his notes on the Makushi, and other tribal languages of the region. Keeping in touch with the mission he used to compose hymns in Wapishana. Cuthbert Cary-Elwes died in London on 23 August 1945.

== Recognition ==
Acknowledging the great contribution the simple missionary made to the people of the Amazonian forest made, the Guyana postal department issued in 2007 a stamp in honour of the Missionary among the Amerindians.

== Bibliography ==
- J. Bridges (ed): Rupununi Mission: The story of Cuthbert Cary-Elwes, London, 1985.
- Audrey Butt Colson, Fr Cary-Elwes S.J. and the Alleluia Indians, Amerindian Research Unit, University of Guyana, 1998.
