= Lumid Pau Airport =

Airport in Guyana

- IATA: LUB; ICAO: SYLP

Summary
- Serves: Lumid Pau
- Elevation AMSL: 551 ft / 168 m
- Coordinates: 2°23′40″N 59°26′15″W

Map
- Location in Guyana

Runways
Direction	Length		Surface
Direction	m	ft	Surface
12/30	1,000	3,281	Grass
- Sources: Google Maps GCM

Lumid Pau Airport (IATA: LUB, ICAO: SYLP) is an airport serving the village of Lumid Pau, in the Upper Takutu-Upper Essequibo Region of Guyana. The 1-km long runway has a grass surface.

== See also ==
- List of airports in Guyana
- Transport in Guyana
