= St. Ignatius, Guyana =

St. Ignatius
- Amerindian village
- Location within Guyana
- Coordinates: 3.3549°N 59.7995°W
- Country: Guyana
- Region: Upper Takutu-Upper Essequibo
- Named for: Ignatius of Loyola

Government
  - Toshao: Yusa Xavier (2012)

Population (2012)
  - Total: 1,276

St. Ignatius is an Amerindian village in the Upper Takutu-Upper Essequibo region of Guyana, near the regional capital Lethem and the border of Brazil. It was originally a mission founded by Jesuit priests to serve the Amerindians in the Rupununi savannah.

Kumu and Quarrie are satellite villages of St. Ignatius.

== Demographics ==
The area was settled by Macushi and Wapishana people, later supplemented by Arawak.

The village is mainly Roman Catholic or other Christian denominations. Wapishana, Macushi, and Patamona languages are spoken, while English and Portuguese are prominent second languages.

== History ==
Jesuit Priest Cuthbert Cary-Elwes established a mission in 1909 to cater to the Amerindians of the Rupununi. The spot chosen was Ariwa (a Makushi word for a particular type of fish) and located on the right bank of the Takutu River River, near the Kanuku Mountains. The missionaries dedicated the mission to the founder of the Jesuits.

Today St. Ignatius village is one of the largest Amerindian communities in the central Rupununi. "Self-help" is a part of the village culture, meaning to resolve issues without outside assistance.

In 2020 as a result of the COVID-19 pandemic, a guarded gate was constructed on the road to regulate traffic to the Takutu River, which had been used for illegal border-crossing from Brazil.

== Economy ==
Cattle rearing, brick making, farming, fishing, and construction are all major economic activities of the village.

Helping Hands Women Producers Cooperative Society has a factory that was built with assistance from the Canadian International Development Agency. It produces packaged snacks including cashew nuts and cassava bread, as well as school meals. Roasted cashews are a popular snack food in the area and grow wild in the Rupununi area.

== Services ==
The village has a nursery, primary, and secondary school. The secondary school in St. Ignatius was opened by the Catholic missionaries, and is the oldest and largest in the region, with boarding facilities for students from remote areas. In 2017, a bilingual education program was launched for Wapishana language and English. There is a catholic church as well as a Jesuit-run Presbytery training Centre.

St. Ignatius is on Lethem's electrical grid. In 2019, The Guyana Water Inc commissioned a $15M water supply system in the village which expanded the community's access to piped water.

Governance is by an elected village council of toshao, deputy and councilors.

The village is located on the main Georgetown-Lethem road and is separated from Lethem by the Moco-Moco Creek.
