= Surama =

- Amerindian village
- Location in Guyana
- Coordinates: 4°8′13″N 59°4′6″W
- Country: Guyana
- Region: Upper Takutu-Upper Essequibo
- Founded: 1974
- Founder: Fred and Theo Allicock

Government
  - Senior Councilor: Michael Allicock (2012)

Area
  - Total: 13 km^{2} (5 sq mi)

Population (2012)
  - Total: 274
  - Density: 21/km^{2} (55/sq mi)

Surama is an Amerindian village in the North Rupununi area and the Upper Takutu-Upper Essequibo Region of Guyana, with a population of 274 people as of 2012.

The village is primarily inhabited by Makushi people.

== History ==
The area of land in which Surama is located has been inhabited sporadically for many years. An established cattle-trail ran through the area in the early twentieth century, and Surama was an important stopping-point on that trail. As the cattle-trail dwindled, however, so did the number of inhabitants in the area, and by the 1970s Surama was completely deserted. The modern village of Surama was founded in the 1974 by two brothers, Fred and Theo Allicock.

=== Eco-Tourism ===
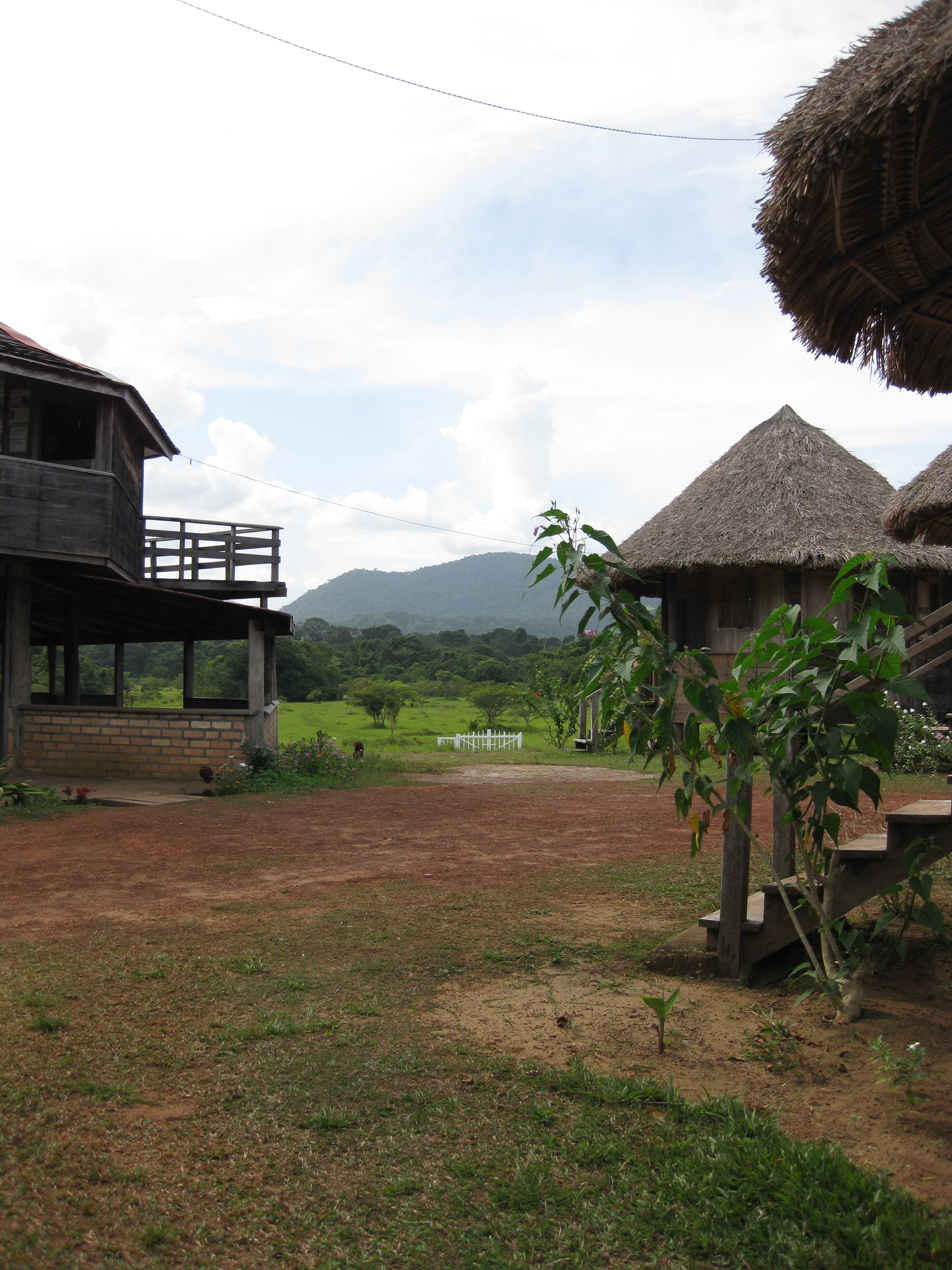
Surama Eco-Lodge (2009)

Following the construction of the Linden-Lethem road in the mid to late 1970s, Surama and surrounding areas became more accessible to the general public. In 1996, Surama received its first tourists, and the money they gave the community to pay for their stay funded the construction of Surama's first guest-lodge. Since that time the village has become a leader in community-based, eco-tourism in Guyana. In 2011, Surama Eco-Lodge was listed by the National Geographic as one of the "best hotels in Colombia, Guyana and Venezuela"; and in the same year it was the joint winner of the Caribbean Tourism Organisation Excellence in Sustainable Tourism Award, along with Harrison's Cave in Barbados.

== Description and location ==
Surama village extends across 12.95 squared kilometres (5 square miles) of land, and is located in a valley on the border of the Guyanese rainforest and the North Rupununi savannahs. It is bounded by Iwokrama Forest protected area, the Burro-Burro River, and the Pacaraima Mountains. Surama Mountain lies to the East of the village.

== Economy ==
Up until the mid-1990s, Surama's economy relied primarily on subsistence agriculture, with a minority of male villagers taking paid jobs as loggers or gold-miners in the North-West region of Guyana or across the border in Brazil. Following the increasing success with eco-tourism, however, Surama Eco-Tourism now provides approximately 60% of Surama's income, with 75% of households deriving income from the tourist trade.
