= Awaruwaunau Airport =

Airport in Guyana

- IATA: none; ICAO: SYAW

Summary
- Serves: Awarewaunau
- Elevation AMSL: 797 ft / 243 m
- Coordinates: 2°38′50″N 59°11′40″W

Map
- Location in Guyana

Runways
| Direction | Length | | Surface |
| Direction | m | ft | Surface |
|---|---|---|---|
| 09/27 | 570 | 1,870 | Grass |
- Sources: Bing Maps GCM

Awaruwaunau Airport (ICAO: SYAW) is an airport serving the village of Awarewaunau, an Amerindian village in the Upper Takutu-Upper Essequibo Region of Guyana. The grass-surface runway is merely 570 meters long.

== See also ==
- List of airports in Guyana
- Transport in Guyana
