= Katoonarib =

Village in southern Guyana

Katoonarib Katoonaru Iribi
- Village
- Location in Guyana
- Coordinates: 2.7676°N 59.5756°W
- Country: Guyana
- Region: Upper Takutu-Upper Essequibo

Government
  - Toshao: Marcus Alexander

Area
  - Total: 180 km^{2} (68 sq mi)

Population (2021)
  - Total: 382

Katoonarib (short for Katoonaru Iribi) is a village in the Upper Takutu-Upper Essequibo Region of Guyana. Katoonarib is inhabited by Wapishana, Macushi and other Amerindians. It is located near the Rupununi River. The main language spoken in the village is Wapishana with English as secondary language.

== Overview ==
The name of the village translates to Bush Island. Katoonarib used to be a satellite of Sawariwau, but has set up its own traditional government. The economy is based on subsistence farming and cattle ranching. The village has a primary school, a health centre, and a community centre. Internet connection is provided via free Wi-Fi. Water is supplied by wells. There is no electricity other than private diesel generators and solar panels.

== Transport ==
Katoonarib can be reached by road from Lethem. A bridge over the Rupununi River was commissioned in 2004. On 27 May 2008, the bridge collapsed under the weight of an excavator.
