= Audrey Butt Colson =

British social anthropologist (1926–2026)

Audrey Joan Butt Colson
- Born: Audrey Joan Butt; 15 March 1926; Gloucestershire, England
- Died: 23 October 2026 (aged 100)
- Education: University of Oxford
- Known for: Study of the Amerindian peoples of Guyana, Brazil and Venezuela
- Spouse: Robin Colson
- Scientific career
- Fields: Social anthropology
- Thesis: Systems of belief in relation to social structure and organisation (with reference to the Carib-speaking tribes of the Guianas) (1954)

Audrey Joan Butt Colson (15 March 1926 – 23 October 2026) was a British social anthropologist with a particular interest in the Amerindian peoples of Guyana, Brazil and Venezuela. She was, together with Peter Rivière, one of the pioneers of Amazonian anthropology at the University of Oxford.

Part of the permanent endowment of the University of Oxford is a fund to support South American Amerindian Studies known as the Butt Colson Amerindian Studies Bequest.

== Oxford University ==
Audrey Butt was born on 15 March 1926. She studied at Oxford under Edward Evans-Pritchard, and carried out fieldwork among the Akawaio people in Guyana in 1951–1952 and in 1957, later broadening her study to include other Pemon and Kapon groups in Brazil, Guyana and Venezuela. She obtained the Diploma in Ethnology in 1949, the B.Litt. degree in 1950, and the D.Phil. in 1955. She then spent a year in Spain to learn Spanish in preparation for further fieldwork in South America.

In 1956 she lectured on South American societies at Oxford's Department of Ethnology.

== Pitt Rivers Museum ==
The South American collections of the Pitt Rivers Museum contain 310 Amerindian objects donated by Butt Colson as a result of her fieldwork. The museum also holds two reels of 16mm film shot by Bassett Maguire in 1952 and a BBC recording of Akawaio music and songs made in 1961, all produced with Butt Colson's assistance.

== Amerindian land disputes ==
In 2012 a judge in the Demerara High Court ruled that Dr. Colson could not appear as an expert witness in a land suit brought by Akawaio and Arekuna Amerindian communities because of her prior support of the plaintiffs' position.

In September 2013 Survival International published her report, Dug out, dried out or flooded out? Hydro Power and Mining Threats to the Indigenous Peoples of the Upper Mazaruni District, Guyana, demonstrating that the government of Guyana's plans to build hydroelectric dams on the upper Mazaruni River would flood the entire territory of the Akawaio indigenous people.

== Death ==
Butt Colson died on 23 October 2026, aged 100.

== Works ==
=== Books ===
- Butt, Audrey J. (1952). The Nilotes of the Anglo-Egyptian Sudan and Uganda. London: International African Institute. ISBN 9780853020295.
- Baxter, Paul Trevor William; Butt Colson, Audrey (1953). The Azande, and related peoples of the Anglo-Egyptian Sudan and Belgian Congo. Ethnographic survey of Africa. London: International African Institute. OCLC 3352883.
- Stewart Wavell, Audrey Butt, Nina Epton, Trances (London: Allen & Unwin, 1966)
- Butt Colson, Audrey (1998). Fr Cary-Elwes S.J. and the Alleluia Indians. Georgetown, Guyana: Amerindian Research Unit, University of Guyana. ISBN 9789766240103. (see also Cuthbert Cary-Elwes)
- Butt Colson, Audrey (2009). Land: its occupation, management, use and conceptualization. The case of the Akawaio and Arekuna of the Upper Mazaruni District, Guyana. Panborough: Last Refuge. ISBN 9780954435073.

=== Journal articles and chapters in books ===
- Butt, Audrey J. (April 1956). "Ritual blowing: Taling – a causation and cure of illness among the Akawaio". Man. 56: 49–55. doi:10.2307/2793660. JSTOR 2793660.
- Butt, Audrey J. (1958). "Secondary urn burial among Akawaio". Timehri. Journal of the Royal Agricultural and Commercial Society of British Guiana. 37: 74–88.
- Butt, Audrey J. (January 1960). "The birth of a religion: the origins of a semi-Christian religion among the Akawaio". Journal of the Royal Anthropological Institute. 60 (1): 66–106. doi:10.2307/2844219. JSTOR 2844219.
- Butt, Audrey J. (1961). "Symbolism and ritual among the Akawaio of British Guiana". New West Indian Guide. 41 (1): 141–161. doi:10.1163/22134360-90002345.
- Butt Colson, Audrey J. (1971). "Hallelujah among the Patamona Indians". Antropológica. 28: 25–58. OCLC 883788082.
- Butt Colson, Audrey J. (1973). "Inter-tribal trade in the Guiana Highlands". Antropológica. 34: 1–70. OCLC 883788237.
- Butt Colson, Audrey J. (1976). "Binary oppositions and the treatment of sickness among the Akawaio", in Loudon, J.B. (ed.), Social Anthropology and Medicine, London: Academic Press, pp. 422–499.
- Butt, Audrey J. (1977), "The Akawaio Shaman", in Basso, Ellen B. (ed.), Carib-speaking Indians: culture, society, and language, Tucson: University of Arizona Press, pp. 43–65, ISBN 9780816504930.
- Butt Colson, Audrey J. and Morton, J. (1982). "Early Missionary Work among the Taruma and Waiwai of Southern Guyana". Folk. Journal of the Danish Ethnographical Association. 24: 203–206.
- Butt Colson, Audrey J. (1983–84). "The Spatial Component in the Political Structure of the Carib Speakers of the Guiana Highlands: Kapon and Pemon". Antropológica. 59-62: 73-124.
- Butt Colson, Audrey J. (1985). "Routes of Knowledge: An Aspect of Regional Integration in the Circum-Roraima Area of the Guiana Highlands". Antropológica. 63-64: 103–149.
- Butt Colson, Audrey J. (1989). "La naturaleza del ser: conceptos fundamentales de los Kapón y Pemón (Area del Circum-Roraima de las Guayanas)", in Bottasso, J. (ed.), Las religiones amerindias. 500 años después, Quito: Ediciones Abya-Yala, pp. 53–90.
- Butt Colson, Audrey J. (1994–96). "'God's Folk'. The evangelization of Indians in Western Guiana and the Enthusiastic Movement of 1756". Antropológica. 86: 3–111.

=== Reports ===
- Dug out, dried out or flooded out? Hydro Power and Mining Threats to the Indigenous Peoples of the Upper Mazaruni District, Guyana, Survival International, September 2013.
