= North Rupununi =

Area in south-west Guyana

The North Rupununi District in located in south-west Guyana consisting of a mixture of forest, savannah and wetlands ecosystems and is considered one of the most diverse areas in South America. Located on the eastern margin of the larger savannah system which extends into Brazil and is separated by the Ireng and Takutu rivers that come together to form the Rio Branco. The Guyana Rupununi system is divided into the North and South Rupununi by the Kanuku Mountains.

== Geology ==
The North Rupununi is situated on the Guiana Shield, precambrian rock with a complex geology that includes plutonic, volcanic, metamorphic and sedimentary rocks and various rifting, uplifting, sedimentation and erosion events. The geology of the North Rupununi is critical because it fundamentally defines the topography, soils, hydrology and ultimately the economy of the area.

The North Rupununi is part of a Mesozoic graben, the Takutu Basin. The basin is 280 kilometers long and 40 kilometers wide, is over 7 kilometers deep, and covers more than 11,200 square kilometers in Guyana and Brazil.

== The people ==
The 2001 population data indicates that approximately 9000 people live within the 8000km2 in the north Rupununi in twenty seven different villages. The North Rupununi Wetland catchment is the traditional home of the Makushi people. Although the Makushi are still the primary ethnic group in the area, many communities contain a mixture of other indigenous groups and immigrants from the more populated coast. That said, North Rupununi is inhabited mostly by Amerindian peoples, 81% Makushi and 12.6% Wapishana in 2007. Hunting, fishing, and farming livelihoods are being increasingly threatened by mining and road development. Wildlife represents a major local food source in the North Rupununi. Mammals and fish in particular provides the majority of the protein intake for villagers (Watkins et al., 1999). According to a study by the Makushi Research Unit (Forte, 1996) over 100 species of fish are eaten by Makushi. As such, fishing is an extremely important subsistence activity.

== Indigenous peoples in Guyana ==
Officially, Guyana is home to 9 Amerindian tribes, although some tribal designations refer to the descendants of several, formerly linguistically distinct, groups–notably the Wai-wai and Wapishana. The majority are of the Carib linguistic branch - true Caribs, Akawaio, Patamona, Arecuna, Makushi and Wai-wai - coastal Arawak (more accurately termed Lokono) and Wapishana speak Arawakan languages, and the Warrau are Guyana's sole representatives of the Warrau branch. The most recent census showed Amerindian people to number around 47,000 in Guyana, around 8% of the country's total population [Forte 1990a]. However, the concentration of the majority of the non-indigenous population on the coast means that Amerindians form a demographic majority in many parts of the interior. Despite this, industrial development in the interior has tended to by-pass Amerindian populations, and rarely been designed to cater for their needs [La Rose 1994]. Though this situation is being remedied with a greater focus on consultation with Amerindians in current development programmes [e.g. Bishop 1996], the problem of ensuring their full participation in and benefit from the changes that are taking place in Guyana remains. The need for this is compelling - though no comprehensive economic surveys have been performed, conventional economic indicators suggest that Amerindian poverty is a continuing phenomenon [Forte 1993: 6-8].

== Economics and livelihood ==
The cattle and balata latex industries were the economic mainstay of the area from the 1900s to the 1980s. Since then, tourism has grown slowly as has the interest in conserving this global treasure through the work of Conservation International, the Iwokrama Centre, WWF and other community based NGOs and governmental organizations. Recently, the Government has entertained the idea of large scale agricultural initiatives and small scale industrial development in Lethem. The establishment and strengthening of the Georgetown-Lethem road is designed to support increased access to the area.

Aside from subsistence and economic value, the North Rupununi also feature prominently indigenous culture and folklore, and have significant aesthetic value, serving as a primary place of recreation for local residents. Although these communities have legal title to some of their traditional lands, all of the communities currently practice customary user rights to their surrounding land and resources.

The North Rupununi may have a historical comparative advantage in conservation and tourism development. The main competitor for an area like this is the Pantanal in Brazil which has a longer product development and marketing history than the North Rupununi. Although the impacts of the communities on biodiversity have been relatively low, there are several growing threats to biodiversity and to the integrity of the area. Notably the construction of the cross border Takutu River Bridge to Brazil, improvement of the Lethem-Georgetown Road which runs near the Kanuku Mountains and through the Rupununi savannahs, allowing increased access to natural resources, increased population growth in Lethem, the nearest town to the Kanukus, fire, over-harvesting of wildlife for sale to Brazil, and illegal wildlife trade.
