= National Library of Guyana =

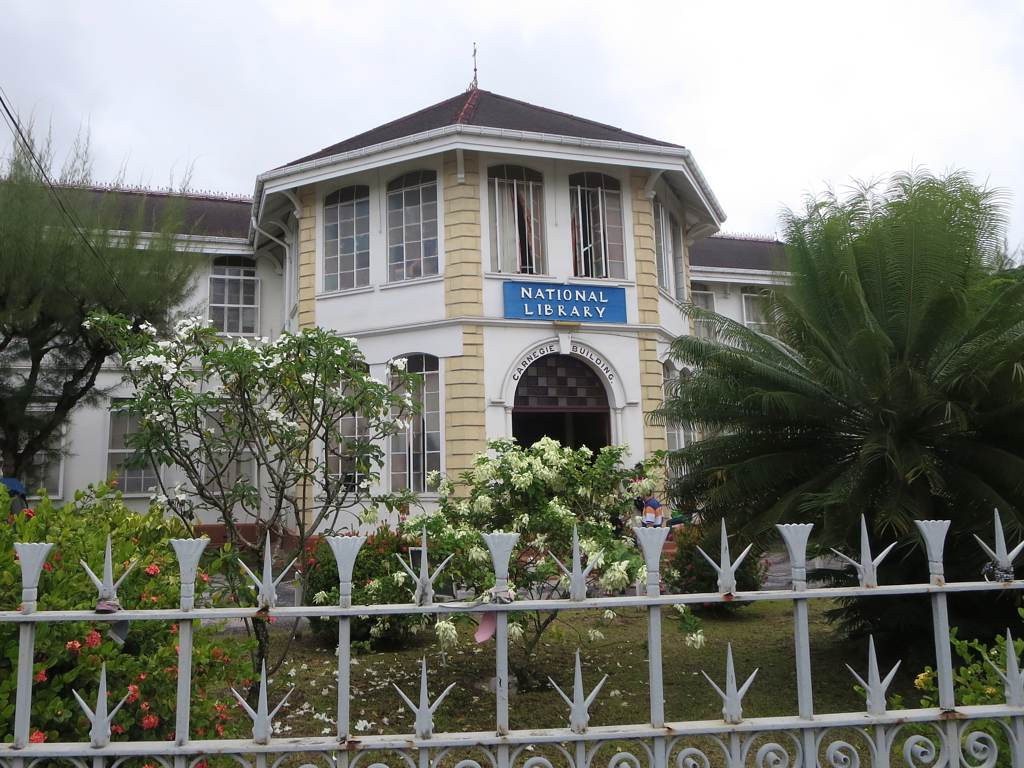
- 6.813805°N 58.164614°W
- Location: Georgetown, Guyana
- Type: National library and Public library
- Established: 1909
- Branches: 5 (New Amsterdam Branch Library; Linden Branch Library; Ruimveldt Branch Library; Bagotville Branch Library and Corriverton Branch Library)

Collection
- Items collected: Books, historical documents, manuscripts, phonograph recordings
- Size: 397,893 (2007)
- Legal deposit: Yes, as enshrined in the Publications and Newspapers Act of 1972

Access and use
- Population served: 200,000 (1990)
- Members: 22,058 (2007)

Other information
- Budget: 700,000 Guyanese dollars (1990)
- Director: Committee of the National Library
- Employees: 60 (1990)

The National Library of Guyana (formerly known as the Carnegie Free Library, the Georgetown Free Public Library and the Free Public Library) is the legal deposit and copyright library for Guyana. Unlike many national libraries, it is also a public lending library and the headquarters of Guyana's public library service, with branches extending throughout the country. Founded in 1909, the National Library of Guyana is situated on the corner of Church Street and Main Street in central Georgetown. In 2007, the library recorded a collection of 397,893 books and a total of 22,058 members. Its collection includes the papers of A. J. Seymour and Ian McDonald.

== History ==
=== Beginnings: The Carnegie Free Public Library ===
The National Library of Guyana has its origins in an initiative by the Scottish-American philanthropist Andrew Carnegie, who donated a sum of £7,000 to enable the construction of a public library in Georgetown, British Guiana (now Guyana), in 1907. The initiative was part of a Caribbean-wide library expansion organised and sponsored by Carnegie, and the National Library of Guyana was one of a number of Carnegie libraries that were built in the region in the early twentieth century.

In 1907, the Governor of the Colony, F. M. Hodson, appointed a Provisional Committee to implement a proposal for the establishment of a Public Free Library using the funding provided by Carnegie. In July 1908, Ordinance No. 12 of 1908, known as the "Public Free Library Ordinance", was passed, which entrusted the maintenance of the library to the Mayor and the Town Council of Georgetown, and to the Combined Court. Construction of the library building began on 28 April 1908, when the foundation stone was laid.

In September 1909 the library, which was initially called the Carnegie Free Library, and later the Georgetown Public Free Library, was opened to the public. Initially it ran on a closed access system by which the public were separated from the books by an iron grille, and requests were written and passed to the librarian through a small window. The library opened with an initial book collection of 57,000 books, which were chosen by the librarian of the Westminster Public Libraries at the request of the Crown Agents of the Colonies, and which were purchased on a budget of £900. 1,500 members had enrolled by the time of opening. The first librarian was Emily Murray, who served at the library from 1909 to 1940. On 4 April 1910, the library opened its lending service with a stock of 5,700 books.

=== Developments: The Georgetown Free Public Library (1911–1949) ===
In 1934, the Carnegie Corporation of New York commissioned a report on the Carnegie libraries in British and American colonies in the Caribbean, which was undertaken by Ernest Savage, the secretary of the Library Association of the UK. Savage's report resulted in a $10,000 grant towards a centralized library system in the Eastern Caribbean and British Guiana region, into which the Georgetown Public Free Library was integrated. In 1940, the library introduced an open access system, allowing members to browse the shelves to select books, which increased membership dramatically.

=== Expansion: The Free Public Library (1950–1971) ===
In 1950, the Government of British Guiana passed a major amendment to legislation relating to the Georgetown Public Free Library, which was titled Ordinance 13 of 1950 or the "Public Free Library Ordinance". This amendment extended the scope of the government's obligation to the public library service to include library branches and other library services anywhere else in the colony. From this moment, therefore, the Georgetown Free Public Library became the headquarters of a national public library service, and was renamed the Free Public Library. In August 1950, the deputy director of the Eastern Caribbean Regional Library, Mr J. Smeaton, came to British Guiana to advise the librarian, Ruby Franker, on the reorganisation of the Public Free Library and the development of a Rural Library Service to provide library services to areas outside of Guyana's major cities, towns and settlements.

Following the Ordinance of 1950, the Public Free Library began to extend its reach throughout Guyana with the establishment of branches in major settlement areas and the introduction of a number of additional services. The first branch of the Public Free Library was opened in New Amsterdam on 23 April 1953. Its initial collection included 2,000 books, and the library was guaranteed a $1,000 annual grant from the New Amsterdam Town Council. In February 1955 a branch was opened in the township of MacKenzie (now part of Linden) with a collection of 3,021 books. The library building was provided by the Demerara Bauxite Company (DEMBA).

In 1950 the Public Free Library introduced a Rural Library Service, in accordance with the advice provided by Smeaton. The first Rural Library Centre was established in Hague Village in West Coast Demerara in Region 3 on 27 August 1950. This was followed by the establishment of Rural Library Centres in Stanleytown (January 1951), Agricola (May 1951), Bagotsville (June 1952), the Essequibo Boys School (February 1953) and Enmore Government School (May 1954).

On 1 December 1966, the year of Guyanese Independence, the Free Public Library took over the prison library service from the Red Cross. The service was extended to the prisons in Georgetown, New Amsterdam, the Mazaruni and Sibley Hall.

In 1970, the Public Free Library began to operate a mobile service after the British Ministry for Overseas Development presented the library with the gift of a mobile library in that year. The first areas to be served by the mobile service were Tocville and Peter's Hall.

=== The National Library (1972-present) ===
In 1972, the Public Free Library Ordinance was amended and a new piece of legislation was passed – the Publication and Newspapers Act (Act 4 of 1972) – in order to establish the Public Free Library as a National library, with the additional responsibility of serving as a depository of books printed in Guyana. To reflect its new responsibilities as both a public library and a national library, the library was renamed the National Library of Guyana. These legislative changes also endowed the National Library of Guyana with the responsibility of producing a Guyanese National Bibliography.

In 1969 the National Library launched a Building Fund Appeal to raise money to add a third story to the Georgetown library building. The British Government were approached for assistance, and in 1973 they donated steel frames for the extension. In 1997 the Government of Guyana approved the extension plans and committed funds for the work, which began the following year.

In 1993, the National Library purchased and installed its first computers, and in 2002 it installed a free internet service.

In 2013, the National Library of Guyana celebrated its centenary. It marked the event with a series of public readings and discussions that focused on oral and folkloric narrative traditions in Guyana.

== Branches ==
The National Library of Guyana has five branches in different parts of the country. These are:

- The New Amsterdam Branch Library (established 1953)
- The Linden (formerly MacKenzie) Branch Library (established 1955)
- The Ruimveldt Branch Library (established 1975)
- The Bagotville Branch Library
- The Corriverton Branch Library (established 1993)

== Services ==
=== National Library Services ===
Since 1972, the National Library of Guyana has served as the legal copyright library for the Cooperative Republic of Guyana. As such, it is entitled to a copy of every publication that is printed in Guyana, and is responsible for storing and conserving this national collection. Since that time, the National Library has also been responsible for compiling and storing the Guyanese National Bibliography, a comprehensive list of every publication that is printed in Guyana. The Guyanese National Bibliography has been in publication since 1973.

=== Public Library Services ===
As a public library, the National Library of Guyana provides a nationwide library service. In addition to its Reference and Lending Departments, the central library in Georgetown runs a Juvenile Department, a phonograph records service (established in 1969) and a toy library service (established in 1981). Since 2002, it has also provided a free internet service. Areas of Guyana that are not served by the central library, or its five branches, are catered for by the Rural Library Service, the Mobile Service and the Prison Service.

==== The Rural Library Service ====
The Rural Library Service was inaugurated in 1950 with the establishment of a Rural Library Centres in Hague Village in August of that year. In 2012 the number of rural library centres throughout the country was listed at twenty-one. There are rural library centres in Aishalton, Albion, Anna Regina, Bartica, Buxton, Crabwood Creek, Hague Village, Mocha, Lethem, Santa Mission and Woodley Park. Rural library centres are managed by volunteer librarians and assistants. In 1955 a training-program was introduced for all voluntary assistants in the rural library centres.

==== The Mobile Service ====
Introduced in 1970, the Mobile Service caters for areas that are not covered by the National Library, its branches, or the rural centres. The National Library of Guyana operates two Mobile Services, the first introduced in 1970 (and serving areas such as Tucville, Peter's Hall, Houston, Providence and Soesdyke) and the second introduced in 1976.

==== The Prison Service ====
Inaugurated in 1966, the Prison service provides library services to the prisons in Georgetown, New Amsterdam, Mazaruni and Sibley Hall. Prison Service collections are managed by prison officers, who are provided with relevant training.

== Collection ==
In 2007, the National Library of Guyana listed a collection of 397,893 books. The collection includes rare historical documents and manuscripts, a special collection of materials pertaining to Guyana, and the papers of two important Guyanese writers: A. J. Seymour and Ian McDonald.
