= Taruma language =

Language isolate of South America

Taruma
- Saluma
- hodjasu dzudzu
- Native to: Guyana, formerly Brazil & Suriname
- Region: South of Aishalton
- Ethnicity: Taruma people
- Native speakers: 3 (2025)
- Language family: Language isolate

Language codes
- ISO 639-3: tdm
- Glottolog: taru1236
- ELP: Taruma

Taruma (Taruamá) is a nearly extinct, divergent language isolate of northeastern South America. It has been reported to be extinct several times since as far back as 1770, but three speakers still live in Maruranau among the Wapishana, and Eithne Carlin is documenting the language. The people and language are known as Saluma by the Tiriyó people in Suriname.

== Classification ==
Taruma is a language isolate. It has been proposed to be distantly related to Katembri, but this relationship has not been repeated in recent surveys of South American languages.

== History ==
Taruma was spoken around the mouth of the Rio Negro during the late 1600s, but the speakers later moved to southern Guyana. In the 1940s, the Taruma tribe were reported to no longer exist as a distinct group. However, their presence has recently been confirmed in the Wapishana village of Marunarau, where they are recognized as a distinct tribe. Only one of the three knows Taruma well enough to produce "coherent texts", and the other two have "a much weaker knowledge" of Taruma.

== Language contact ==
Jolkesky (2016) notes that there are lexical similarities with the Chibchan, Katukina-Katawixi, Arawak, Jeoromitxi, Tupi, Arawa, Jivaro, Karib, Mura-Matanawi, Tukano, Yanomami, and Kwaza language families due to contact.

Similarities with Chibchan (especially with the Magdalena and Dorasque-Changena subgroups) may be due to the former presence of Chibchan speakers in the Northeast Amazons. Similarities with Tucanoan suggest that Taruma had originated in the Caquetá basin.

== Phonology ==
=== Consonants ===
Taruma consonants
		Bilabial		Alveolar		Retroflex	Palatal	Velar		Glottal
		voiceless	voiced	voiceless	voiced	Retroflex	Palatal	voiceless	voiced	Glottal
Nasal			m		n					
Plosive	plain	p	b	t	d			k	g	ʔ
Plosive	lab.							kʷ	gʷ	
Fricative	plain			s		ʐ	ɕ			h
Fricative	lab.	ɸʷ								
Tap					ɾ					

=== Vowels ===
Taruma vowels
	Front		Central		Back	
	plain	nasalized	plain	nasalized	plain	nasalized
Close	i	ĩ	ɨ	ɨ̃		
Mid					o	õ
Open			a	ã		

== Vocabulary ==
For a list of Taruma words from Jolkesky (2016), see the corresponding Portuguese article.

=== Loanwords ===
The following table illustrates some of the aforementioned borrowing situations:

Loanwords in Taruma by language
gloss	Taruma	Damana (Chibchan)	Katukina	Wapishana (Arawakan)	Mawayana (Arawakan)	Arikapu	Proto-Tupian	Proto-Arawan	Proto-Jivaroan	Proto-Cariban	Mura	Proto-Tucanoan
father	aide	ade	-	-	-	-	-	-	-	-	-	-
sister	aʧi	asi	-	-	-	-	-	-	-	-	-	-
mouth	kukana	kəka	-	-	-	-	-	-	-	-	-	-
bird	zuri	suri	-	-	-	-	-	-	-	-	-	-
snake	báhũ	-	paɡo	-	-	-	-	-	-	-	-	-
wood	u	-	-ʔu	-	-	-	-	-	-	-	-	-
tick	piʤíʤi	-	piːʧiN	-	-	-	-	-	-	-	-	-
tobacco	suma	-	uːba	suuma	-	-	-	-	-	-	-	-
bow	kobara	-	-	sumara	-	-	-	-	-	-	-	-
star	wire	-	-	wiiʐi	-	-	-	-	-	-	-	-
go	maku	-	-	makʰu-n	-	-	-	-	*maku 'leg'	-	-	-
monkey	rumi	-	-	ruumi	-	-	-	-	-	-	-	-
worm	pararu	-	-	pʰaʐaru	-	-	-	-	-	-	-	-
egg	dani	-	-	ʤani	-	-	-	-	-	-	-	-
chest	duku	-	-	ɗukʰuri	-	-	-	-	-	-	-	-
flea	kuwaba	-	-	kʰuwaiɓa	-	-	-	-	-	-	-	-
bottle	pateli	-	-	pater	-	-	-	-	-	-	-	-
howler monkey	rumi	-	-	rumi	-	-	-	-	-	-	-	-
calabash	gŏlie	-	-	-	kawalie							
caiman	hiri	-	-	-	-	uhiri	-	-	-	-	-	-
deer	konia	-	-	-	-	kudi	-	-	-	-	-	-
dance (v.)	kabihwi	-	-	-	-	kəwi	-	-	-	-	-	-
eat	ko	-	-	-	-	-	*kˀu	-	-	-	-	-
path	afe	-	-	-	-	-	*ape	-	-	-	-	-
arrow	kupa	-	-	-	-	-	*ekʷˀɨp	-	-	-	-	-
salt	wuka	-	-	-	-	-	*wukɨt	-	-	-	-	-
deer	hiʧi	-	-	-	-	-	*ɨʧɨ	-	-	-	-	-
axe	bade	-	-	-	-	-	-	*bari	-	-	-	-
wild dog	hi	-	-	-	-	-	-	*-hi	-	-	-	-
forest	nukuda	-	-	-	-	-	-	*nuku 'mountain'	-	-	-	-
peccary	baki 'tapir'	-	-	-	-	-	-	-	*paki	*pakira	-	-
leaf	ʤuka	-	-	-	-	-	-	-	*nuka	-	-	-
sweet-potato	aɸi	-	-	-	-	-	-	-	-	*napi	-	*jãpi
canoe	kanawa	-	-	-	-	-	-	-	-	*kanawa	-	-
hand	aɸũ	-	-	-	-	-	-	-	-	*apô 'arm'	-	-
earth	dudu	-	-	-	-	-	-	-	-	*nono	-	-
poison	kʷima	-	-	-	-	-	-	-	-	*kuma	-	-
fire	hʷa	-	-	-	-	-	-	-	-	-	hũai	-
breast	iwa	-	-	-	-	-	-	-	-	-	iiwe	-
mountain	uwai	-	-	-	-	-	-	-	-	-	uwe 'forest'	-
foot	apa	-	-	-	-	-	-	-	-	-	apai	-
tongue	njebena	-	-	-	-	-	-	-	-	-	-	*tʲʔeme
water	dja	-	-	-	-	-	-	-	-	-	-	*tʲʔia 'river'
three	wikʲã	-	-	-	-	-	-	-	-	-	-	*ɨtˀia
woman	ɡumi-	-	-	-	-	-	-	-	-	-	-	*tʔõmi-
