= Awarewaunau =

- Village
- Location in Guyana
- Coordinates: 2.6426°N 59.1919°W
- Country: Guyana
- Region: Upper Takutu-Upper Essequibo

Government
  - Toshao: Johnny Duncan (2012-)

Area
  - Total: 782.0 km^{2} (301.93 sq mi)

Population (2021)
  - Total: c. 600

Awarewaunau (also: Awaruwaunawa) is a village in the Upper Takutu-Upper Essequibo Region of Guyana. Awarewaunau is inhabited by Wapishana Amerindians.

== Overview ==
In 1909 missionaries arrived in the area. Awarewaunau was founded in the 1920s. The name is Wapishana and means Windy Creek Hill. The main religion of the villagers is Christian.

The economy of Awarewaunau is based on subsistence farming and livestock. The village has a primary school and a health centre. Secondary education is offered in Aishalton. As of 2019, the village is connected to the internet. In 2018, water wells were constructed in the village as part of a joint exercise of the Brazilian Army and the Guyana Defence Force.

== Transport ==
Awarewaunau is served by the Awaruwaunau Airport. In 2018, a contract was awarded to construct a road from Lethem to Shea via Awarewaunau.

== Nature ==
Awarewaunau is on the edge of a large pristine rainforest which is home to cock-of-the-rocks, harpy eagles, and bush dogs. The forest is part of the Wapichan Conserved Forest, a planned 1,400 square kilometres (540 sq mi) protected area.
