= Taruma people =

Indigenous people of Brazil, Guyana and Suriname

Taruma
Hojasu
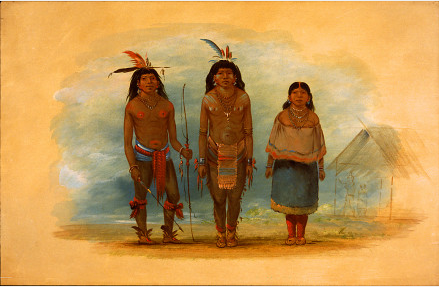
- Painting of three Taruma Amerindians by George Catlin (1854-1875)

Total population
- Uncertain; descendants found among neighboring tribes

Languages
- Various local languages (e. g. Wapishana) & Taruma (endangered)

Religion
- Christianity

Related ethnic groups
- Wai-wai, Tiriyó

The Taruma (Saloema in Suriname; Tarənos in the Tiriyó language, Taruma: Hojasu) are an Indigenous people found in the northern Brazil, southern Guyana, and southern Suriname. They used to speak Taruma which is considered critically endangered and is spoken only by three people today. The Taruma in Suriname have merged with the Tiriyó, in Brazil they merged with the Wai-wai. The Wapishana village of Maruranau in Guyana still recognises the tribe.

== History ==
The Taruma used to inhabit the Kutari, Trombetas and the Paru de Oeste Rivers. They used to trade extensively with the Tiriyó people and the Ndyuka and specialised in hunting dogs. The Encyclopaedie van Nederlandsch West-Indië of 1917 remarked that they should not be confused with the Taruma on the Essequibo River, because they spoke a different language; however, they are probably the same people, and those living along the Essequibo had lost their language due to contact with the Wai-wai.

In 1843, first contact was made by Robert Schomburgk at the source of the Trombetas. In 1907, Claudius de Goeje led the Tumuk Humak expedition. The Ndyuka guides did not want to pass through the Taruma-held territory because of hostility between the two people, but de Goeje decided to contact the group, because he needed local guides to reach the Sipaliwini River. In 1910 they were visited by Johan Eilerts de Haan as part of the Courantyne expedition who noted that the Taruma lived on the Kutari and the Tiriyó on the Sipaliwini. In the 1930s there was a war between the Tiriyó and Taruma in the Suriname-Brazil border area which resulted in the Taruma moving further south into Brazil. The Taruma have since been considered a lost tribe in Suriname. In Guyana, they are also not listed as an Amerindian tribe.

During the 1960s, the Amerindians in Suriname and Brasil were concentrated in larger villages by the North-American missionaries. In 1963 and 1964, they were visited by the anthropologist Peter Rivière. During a visit a Tiriyó told him: "Those Tiriyós in Alalapadu are not really Tiriyós, but Tarənos". After investigating, it turned out that Taruma had merged with the Tiriyó and they presently have a minority presence in Kwamalasamutu, Suriname. The Taruma on the Brazilian and Guyanese side had merged into the Wai-wai. A group is living with the Wapishana in Maruranau, Guyana, and they are recognised by the Wapishana community.

Although traditional historical literature has pointed to the Taroma language as completely extinct, academic investigations and reports in the early 21st century have brought new evidence regarding the survival of the language. As recorded by professor Bessa Freire, linguist Eithne Carlin from Leiden University in the Netherlands identified a remnant group of fluent Tarumã speakers during her field research on Amerindian languages in the Guianas region (Suriname, French Guiana, and former British Guiana). Following this discovery, Carlin initiated a systematic linguistic documentation project with the last remaining speakers of the ethnic group.
