= Nina Epton =

British radio producer, broadcaster and travel writer

- Born: 1913
- Died: 29 October 2010 (aged 96–97); Peacehaven, East Sussex, England
- Citizenship: British
- Education: University of Paris
- Occupations: radio producer, travel writer
- Writing career
- Years active: 1949–1977
- Period: 20th century
- Genre: travel writing
- Notable works: Love and the French (1959); Love and the English (1960); Love and the Spanish (1961)

Nina Consuelo Epton (1913 – 29 October 2010) was a British radio producer, broadcaster and travel writer, particularly active in the 1950s and 1960s. She was renowned globally for her explorations and radio commentary and travelled alone through Spain, North Africa, and Indonesia. In the 1970s she published a number of historical works about royalty, two books about cats, and a novel based on the life of Jane Digby.

Her greatest commercial success was a series of literary, historical and sociological books about amorous relationships: Love and the French (1959), Love and the English (1960), Love and the Spanish (1961). In various combinations these were translated into French, German and Spanish. All three were reprinted by Penguin Books in 1964–1965.

== Life ==
=== Early life ===
Epton was born in Hampstead to a Scottish father and a Spanish mother. She was educated partly in England and partly in France, graduated from the University of Paris, and travelled widely.

=== Career ===
During the 1950s she was the producer of the BBC's French-Canadian department, with particular responsibility for BBC contributions to the Canadian Broadcasting Corporation's French-language newsreel, Revue de l'actualité. Between 1953 and 1969 she was also an occasional contributor to the BBC Home Service and the BBC Light Programme as a presenter, interviewer, and panellist.

As a travel writer she was considered something of a novelty in the early 1950s, as a good-looking woman who travelled alone and engaged deeply and critically with local conditions.

Epton died on 29 October 2010.

==== Advocacy for Moroccan Independence ====
In the summer of 1946, Nina Epton encountered Moroccan nationalists during her travels in Tangier, swiftly aligning herself with their cause. Upon her return to London, Epton wrote critical articles about French colonial policies, giving the nationalists considerable publicity. She became the first mainstream Western journalist to portray the Moroccan nationalist movement sympathetically.

Epton also wrote a book dedicated to the nationalists, chronicling her meetings with nationalist leaders who believed in the power of world public opinion to secure Moroccan independence. She expressed optimism that the United Nations would address North African independence and that American support would follow. Her work was praised for portraying Morocco from a Moroccan perspective, giving credibility to the nationalist struggle on the world stage. While the Moroccans valued Epton's advocacy, the colonial authorities perceived her as a threat, leading to her arrest and interrogation in 1947.

== Publications ==
=== Articles ===
- "A Visit to Xavier, the Birthplace of St Francis ", in The Tablet, 23 Oct. 1954.
- "What about Santa Claus? A Child's Christmas in Spain", in The Tablet, 17 Dec. 1955.
- "Medieval Echoes in Modern Texas", in The Tablet, 21 Dec. 1968.

=== Books ===
- Journey under the Crescent Moon (London: V. Gollancz, 1949).
- Oasis Kingdom: The Libyan Story (London: Jarrolds, 1952).
- Islands of the Sunbird: Travels in Indonesia (London and New York: Jarrolds, 1954).
- The Islands of Indonesia, 4 volumes (London: Pitman, 1955)
- The Valley of Pyrene (London: Cassell, 1955).
- Grapes and Granite (London: Cassell, 1956)
- The Palace and the Jungle (London: Oldbourne Press, 1957)
- Navarre: The Flea between Two Monkeys (London: Cassell, 1957)
- The Golden Sword: Being the dramatized story of Sir Thomas Stamford Raffles, 1781–1826 (London: Oldbourne, 1957)
- Saints and Sorcerers: A Moroccan Journey (London: Cassell, 1958).
- Love and the French (London: Cassell, 1959)
- Love and the English (London: Cassell, 1960)
- Love and the Spanish (London, 1961)
- Milord and Milady (London: Oldbourne, 1962)
- Seaweed for Breakfast: A Picture of Japanese Life Today (London: Cassell, 1963)
- Madrid (London: Cassell, 1964)
- Spain's Magic Coast, from the Miño to the Bidassoa: A personal guidebook (London: Weidenfeld & Nicolson, 1966)
- Trances (London: Allen & Unwin, 1966); with Stewart Wavell & Audrey Butt
- Spanish Fiestas: including romerías, excluding bull-fights (London: Cassell, 1968)
- Andalusia (London: Weidenfeld & Nicolson, 1968)
- Victoria and Her Daughters (London: Weidenfeld and Nicolson, 1971).
- The Spanish Mousetrap: Napoleon and the Court of Spain (London: Macdonald and Co, 1973)
- Cat Manners and Mysteries (London: Michael Joseph, 1973)
- The Burning Heart: A novel based on the life of Jane Digby, Lady Ellenborough (London: Macdonald and Jane's, 1974)
- Magic and Mystics of Java (London: Octagon Press, 1974)
- Josephine: The Empress and Her Children (London: Weidenfeld and Nicolson, 1975)
- Dora Bell's Village Cats (London: Joseph, 1977)
