= Dadanawa Ranch =

- Estate
- Location in Guyana
- Coordinates: 2°50′N 59°31′W
- Country: Guyana
- Region: Upper Takutu-Upper Essequibo

Population (2012)
  - Total: 391

Dadanawa Ranch is located on the Rupununi River in the Rupununi savannah in the Upper Takutu-Upper Essequibo Region of Guyana. It is the largest and one of the most isolated cattle ranches in Guyana.

== Location ==
Dadanawa Ranch is one of the most remote ranches in the world containing about 6,000 cattle. The ranch area is said to be 1,700 sq mi (4,400 km^{2}; 1,100,000 acres). It is located on the Rupununi River in the South Rupununi savannahs, in the Upper Takutu-Upper Essequibo Region of Guyana. The habitat of the area is diverse, "ranging from riparian forest/scrub along the Rupununi River to savanna with few scattered trees".

Tourists often stay at Dadanawa and use the ranch as a base for further journeys throughout the South Rupununi.

== History ==
The name "Dadanawa" is a distortion of the local Wapishana Amerindian name of Dadinauwau, or "macaw spirit creek hill".

Dadanawa started out as a trading post by a man of the name DeRooie about 1865 and was sold with 300 head of cattle in the late 1880s to H.P.C. Melville, a gold prospector from Barbados who found himself lost and near-dead of malaria in the area several years before. The ranch was sold to investors and established as the Rupununi Development Company in 1919.

== Workers ==
Ranch cowboys are called "vaqueros", most of whom are Wapishana Amerindians who operate barefoot and are responsible for managing ranch livestock. The ranch supports over 40 people in the main compound including the direct and extended families of the manager and staff, some of which extend for three generations.

The ranch is now run by Duane de Freitas, his wife Sandie and son Justin along with his Irish partner, Erin Earl. They run an ecotourism business from the ranch and visitors from all over the world come to birdwatch or go on river trips in the savannahs and Amazon rainforest. Duane and Justin have set up the Rupununi Conservation Society to protect the highly endangered siskins and other bird and river turtle species.

== Harry E Turner ==
Harry E Turner was an English ex-cavalry officer who said that he had ridden in the last British army cavalry charge in the Middle East during the First World War. He was the manager of Dadanawa up to 1965, and retired to England that year.

== Bibliography ==
- The Rupununi Development Company Limited -The Early History, 1972, *Turner, Harry E.
