= Wichabai =

- Ranch
- Location in Guyana
- Coordinates: 2°52′0″N 59°31′59.88″W
- Country: Guyana
- Region: Upper Takutu-Upper Essequibo

Wichabai is a community in the Upper Takutu-Upper Essequibo Region of Guyana, located at 2°52′0″N 59°31′59.88″W, altitude 157 metres. Wichabai is a cattle ranch in the Rupununi savannah that caters to eco-tourism. The ranch can be reached from Wichabai Airport.
