= Aranaputa =

- Village
- Location in Guyana
- Coordinates: 3°58′00″N 59°10′00″W
- Country: Guyana
- Region: Upper Takutu-Upper Essequibo

Government
  - Chairman: Gillian Rodrigues

Population (2012)
  - Total: 353

Aranaputa is an Amerindian village in the Upper Takutu-Upper Essequibo (Region 9), Guyana. It is located in the Pacaraima Mountains.

The name Aranaputa comes from the Makushi word for 'burnt up', due to various instances of fire in the village.

The 2012 census population is 353. In addition to English, Wapishana, and Macushi language are also commonly spoken languages. It has a nursery and a primary school, but secondary schooling is done in Annai Secondary situated at Bina Hill in Kwatamang. Healthcare is provided by a public health centre. Major economic activities include peanut production, livestock rearing, and tourism.

It has a satellite village, Kuribu. Chairman of their Community Development Council is Aiden Jacobus.

== History ==
Amerindians have historically resided in the area, however settlement was often temporary. In 1958, the government demarcated plots of land and leased it out to coastlanders, while designating another area as an Amerindian reservation. By 1940, the village had 4 coastland families, 3 of Portuguese origin and 1 Afro-Guyanese. Ranching and growing tobacco were their main economic trades.
