= Stewart Brooke-Wavell =

British broadcaster and writer in Malaysia

Stewart Brooke-Wavell, or Stewart Wavell (1921–2010), was a British Malayan broadcaster, sound recordist and writer, and a member of the Malaysian Branch of the Royal Asiatic Society.

== Life ==
Born in British Malaya, Wavell became a broadcaster with Radio Malaya, presenting programmes about the course of the Malayan Emergency in 1953, establishing their Sound Library, and pioneering their phone-in broadcasting. Between 1954 and 1962 he also produced or participated in a number of programmes or segments for the BBC, including coverage of the royal tour of the Commonwealth in 1954, and a profile of Tom Harrisson broadcast on 30 September 1960. His main interests were folklore, cultural anthropology, and exploration, and he was known for his field recordings in these areas. In 1960 he was the BBC's Burmese programme organiser, and in 1963 he accompanied a Cambridge University expedition to locate the ancient "lost" kingdoms of Langkasuka and Tambralinga.

In the late 1960s he served as director of training for the Ceylon Broadcasting Corporation, and wrote a training manual for them. By 1976 he was living in Surrey, England, and working as head of the BBC's Far Eastern Service. He died in Croydon on 16 September 2010.

His brother was Bruce Brooke-Wavell.

== Publications ==
- The Lost World of the East (1958)
- The Naga King's Daughter (1965)
- with Audrey Butt and Nina Epton, Trances (1966)
- The Art of Radio (1969)
- A Dream of Kinabalu (1988)
- Great Cobra Mountain (1990)
