= Hiawa =

- Village
- Location in Guyana
- Coordinates: 3.3899°N 59.6288°W
- Country: Guyana
- Region: Upper Takutu-Upper Essequibo

Government
  - Councillor: Anastasia Clementino

Population
  - Total: c.278

Hiawa is an Indigenous village of Macushi Amerindians in the Upper Takutu-Upper Essequibo Region of Guyana. It is located in the Rupununi savannah. Hiawa is considered a satellite of Nappi.

== Overview ==
Hiawa has a school, a health hut, and a church. The nearest big village is Nappi. In 2016, a road was built connecting the village to Lethem. In 2019, a multi-purpose building was constructed in the village.

In 2016, the residents of Hiawa launched a protest, because their requests for land extensions were not being processed while private developers are encroaching on their territory.

The economy of the village is based on agriculture. The main products are corn, sweet cassava, sweet potatoes, and bananas.
