= Nappi, Guyana =

Nappi
- Village
- Location in Guyana
- Coordinates: 3.4130°N 59.5789°W
- Country: Guyana
- Region: Upper Takutu-Upper Essequibo

Government
  - Toshao: Walter Henrico

Area
  - Total: 221.20 km^{2} (85.406 sq mi)

Population
  - Total: 652
  - Density: 2.95/km^{2} (7.63/sq mi)

Nappi is an Indigenous village of Macushi Amerindians in the Upper Takutu-Upper Essequibo Region of Guyana. It is located in the Rupununi savannah along the Nappi and Maipaima creeks on the edge of the Kanuku Mountains.

== History ==
Nappi was settled around 1800 by Karu’ku and Nan’pi, two Amerindians had escaped tribal war in the Rio Negro region of Brazil. The Kanuku mountains were named after Karu'ku, and Nappi was named after Nan’pi. On 28 May 1838, Nappi was visited by the explorer Robert Hermann Schomburgk. The arrival of missionaries in Crashwater resulted in part of the village relocating to Nappi. The main religion in the village is Christian.

== Overview ==
The main language spoken in Nappi is Macushi with English as a secondary language. The village has a primary school and a health care centre. The economy is based on farming. Balatá bleeding, a sort of rubber, was an important economic activity in the past. Internet connection is provided via free Wi-Fi. Water is provided by a reservoir. There are diesel generators and solar panels.

Two waterfalls can be found near Nappi: the Nappi Falls and Jordan Falls. There is a guest lodge in the village for tourists. The village has two satellites: Parishara, and Hiawa.

Nappi can be reached by car from Lethem via the Sydney Allicock Highway. The nearest airport is Manari Airport.
