= Iwokrama International Centre for Rain Forest Conservation and Development =

The Iwokrama International Centre for Rain Forest Conservation and Development is an autonomous non-profit institution established by Guyana and the Commonwealth.

It started in 1989 as a gift to the Commonwealth by late president Desmond Hoyte, and the Iwokrama Act signed by late President Cheddi Jagan in 1996 officially established the center.

The Iwokrama Programme received its first sizeable financial input in 1993 when the "United Nations Development Programme - UNDP" office in Guyana implemented the first Iwokrama project and secured a "Global Environment Facility - GEF" grant of US$3Million as seed money for establishing the programme. The UNDP/GEF project document was signed in early 1993 and it was closely implemented by UNDP and the Government of Guyana. The essential objectives of the project were inter-alias, to provide support for the establishment of the -Iwokrama International Center for Rain Forest Conservation and Development-, to undertake baseline studies, surveys and inventories, to establish a base camp and other facilities at the Programme site, to promote and support the full participation of local communities, to prepare a draft research strategy for the Iwokrama Programme, to articulate a long-term financing plan and resource mobilization strategy. The project forged strong partnerships with the Smithsonian Institution, the University of Guyana, and various other research organizations. UNDP Guyana extended additional support to the "Iwokrama Programme" by funding the “North Rupununi Poverty Eradication Project.” This initiative tackled poverty and other challenges in villages and indigenous communities in the region, enhancing their ability to support and contribute to the success of the Iwokrama initiative.

Iwokrama Centre offers compensation in the form of capital to residents of surrounding communities. One third of incomes provided by Iwokrama employment exceed Guyana’s poverty threshold of $282. Financial (or other) compensation for residents can be integral to continued community support of conservation initiatives, and can reduce the likelihood of locals leaving in search of other work in mines or other enterprises in the country.

King Charles has been a patron of the centre since 2000. The centre also works with the University of Guyana's science programme with a focus on biodiversity.

Despite conservation efforts, illegal logging and mining threatens the area. Under the Iwokrama Act, illegal operations can result in a fine of up to GYD $100,000 or imprisonment for a period of one year.
