= Upper Takutu-Upper Essequibo =

Region of Guyana

Coordinates: 2.900996°N 58.93517°W

Upper Takutu-Upper Essequibo Region 9
- Administrative Region
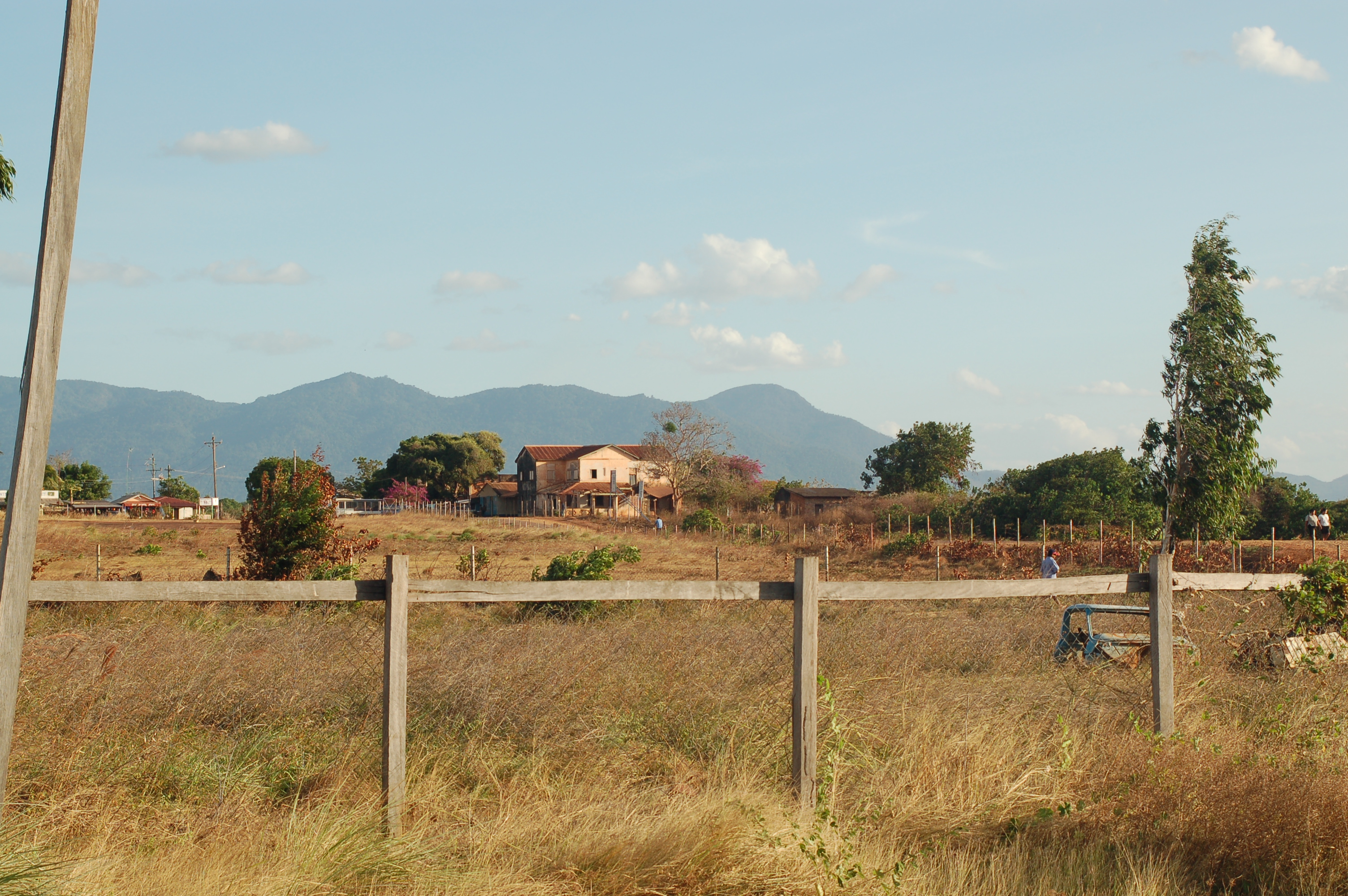

- Flag

- Map of Guyana showing Upper Takutu-Upper Essequibo region
- Country: Guyana
- Capital: Lethem

Area
  - Total: 57,750 km^{2} (22,300 sq mi)

Population (2022 census)
  - Total: 29,944
  - Density: 0.5185/km^{2} (1.343/sq mi)

Upper Takutu-Upper Esequibo (Region 9) is an administrative region of Guyana. Located along the Guyana's border with Brazil, it is spread over an area of 57,750 km^{2} (22,300 sq mi). As per the 2022 census, it had a population of 29,944 inhabitants. The region largely consists of elevated terrain such as the Kanuku and Kamoa highlands, forests, and Rupununi savannah. The economy is dependent on livestock rearing, mining of semi-precious stones, and agriculture.

== Geography ==
Upper Takutu-Upper Essequibo (Region 9) is one of the ten administrative regions of Guyana. It is located along the international border with Brazil, which is situated to its west and south. It is spread over an area of 57,750 km^{2} (22,300 sq mi), and is the largest of the ten regions of Guyana by area. Its capital is at Lethem.

The region largely consists of elevated terrain such as the Kanuku and Kamoa highlands, forests, and Rupununi savannah. The Kanuku mountains divide the region into roughly two parts consisting of savannahs on either side of it. The Rupununi savannah and wetlands are watered by South America’s largest rivers–Amazon and Essequibo, and supports a wide range of wildlife including several endangered species. The region has about 4.5 million hectares of forested area, covering almost 80% of its land area.

Located at an elevation of 384.51 m (1,261.5 ft) above sea level, the district has a tropical rainforest climate (Köppen climate classification: Af). The average annual temperature is 29.22 °C (84.60 °F). The district receives an average annual rainfall of 8.1 cm (3.2 in) and has 149.2 average rainy days in a year.

=== Dispute with Venezuela ===
Venezuela claims the Essequibo region, which is situated west of the Essequibo River, as a part of its territory. The status of the border controversy is subject to the Geneva Agreement, which was signed by the United Kingdom, Venezuela and British Guiana on 17 February 1966. As of December 2020, the matter is being addressed by the International Court of Justice.

== Economy ==
The economy is dependent on livestock rearing, mining of semi-precious stones, and agriculture. Major agricultural produce include tobacco, rice, and peanuts. The Rupununi savannah is known as "cattle country", due to the large scale cattle farming for dairy and meat. The beef is exported to Brazil. Semiprecious stones are mined in the foothills of the Kamoa and Marundi mountains.

== Demographics ==
As per the official census in 1980, the region had a population of 12,873 inhabitants. It increased to 15,058 and 19,387 in the 1991 and 2002 census respectively. As per the 2022 census, it had a population of 29,944 inhabitants. The Rupununi is home to several Indigenous communities.

== Communities ==
List of communities:

- Achiwib (Achiwuib Village)
- Aishalton (Aishalton Village, Ishalton)
- Annai (Anwai)
- Apoteri
- Aranaputa
- Awarewaunau (Awaruwaunawa)
- Basha Village (Bashaidrun)
- Dadanawa
- Hiawa
- Kaibarupai Village
- Kanashen (Konashen)
- Karanambo
- Karasabai (Karasabai Village)
- Karaudarnau (Lumid Pau)
- Katoonarib
- Kumu Village
- Kwaimatta (Kwaimatta Village, Kwaiwatta Village, Kwamatta)
- Lethem (Lethen)
- Maruranau (Maruranawa, Marurawaunawa, Marurawaunawa Village)
- Massara (Massara Village)
- Moco-Moco (Moco-Moco Village)
- Nappi
- Parabara
- Parishara (Parishara Village)
- Rewa
- Sand Creek
- Sawariwau
- Shea (Shea Village, Shoa)
- Shulinab (Shulinab Village, Village Shulinab)
- St. Ignatius (Saint Ignatius Mission)
- Surama (Surama Village, Surumatra)
- Tiger Pond Village
- Tipuru (Tipuru Village)
- Toka
- Warimure
- Wichabai
- Wowetta (Woweta, Woweta Village)
- Yakarinta
- Yupukari (Eupukari, Yupukarri)

== See also ==
- Rupununi Uprising
