= Rupununi =

Region and river in Guyana

The Rupununi /rʌpəˈnʌni/ is a region in the south-west of Guyana, bordering the Brazilian Amazon. The Rupununi river, also known by the local Indigenous peoples as Raponani, flows through the Rupununi region. The name Rupununi originates from the word rapon in the Makushi language, in which it means the black-bellied whistling duck found along the river.

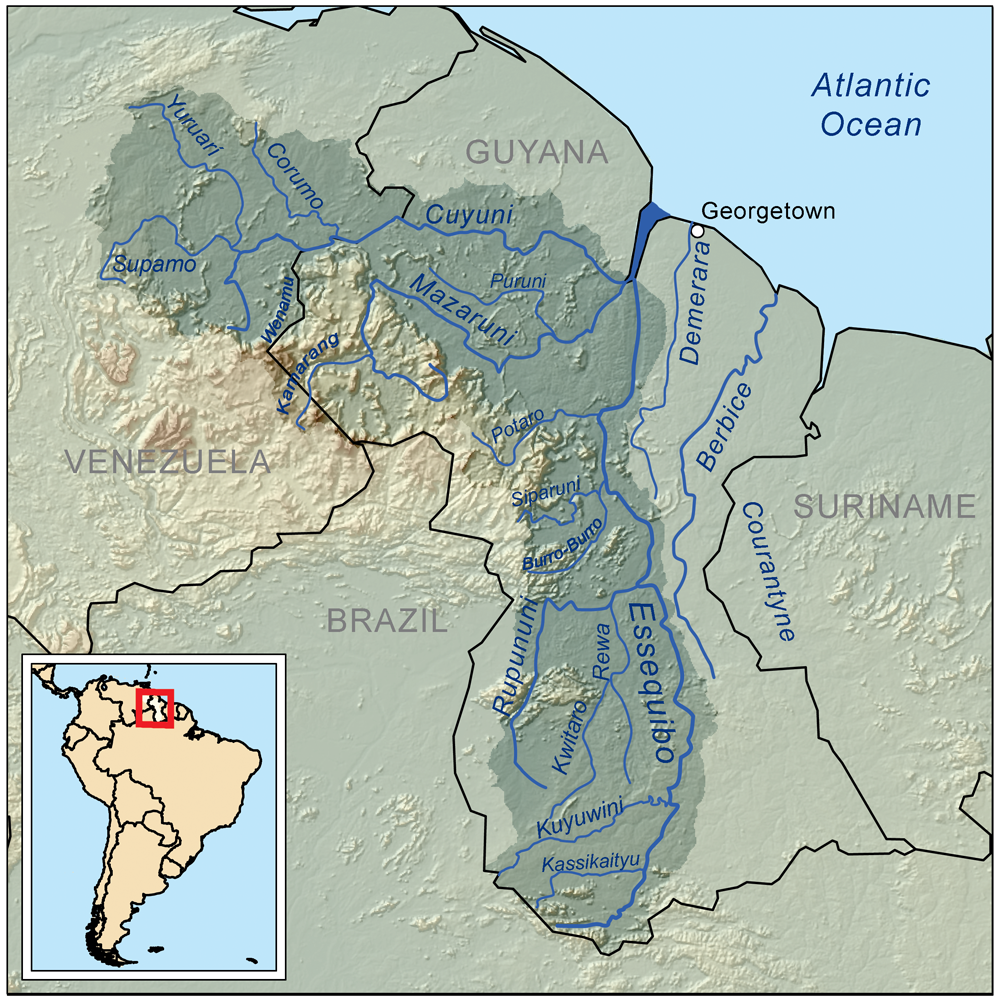
A map of the rivers, including the Rupununi, that flow through Guyana

== Geography ==
The Rupununi River is one of the main tributaries of the Essequibo River and is located in southern Guyana. The river originates in the Kanuku Mountains, which are located in the Upper Takutu-Essequibo region. The Rupununi River flows near the Guyana–Brazil border, and eventually leads into the Essequibo River. Throughout the flood season, the river shares a watershed with the Amazon and is connected to the Takutu River by Pirara Creek. The region surrounding the Rupununi River includes savannah, wetlands, forest, and low mountain ranges. The area of Region 9 is 57,750 square kilometers and has over 80 communities. Most people live within the Rupununi Savannah area, while the jungle covered areas are only populated near major rivers.

== Geology ==
The geology of this area is divided into four main zones. Furthest south are areas of Rhyacian meta-sediments, meta-volcanics (Kwitaro Group), and associated granites, all intruded by Orosirian rocks of the Southern Guyana Granite Complex. The Kanuku Mountains consist of high grade gneisses in a NE-SW belt. The Takutu Graben is a NE-SW fault bounded basin initially filled by basaltic lava, then Mesozoic sediments, including the Takutu Formation. To the north of the Takutu Graben almost flat lying Statherian sandstones and conglomerates of the Roraima Group sediments overly Iwokrama Formation felsic volcanics and associated Orosirian granites. Relict Hadean zircons (xenocrysts) in the Iwokrama Formation suggest that older crust must occur at depth.

== Animal life ==
The areas both in and surrounding the Rupununi river are home to a great diversity of terrestrial and aquatic ecosystems that harbor many species extirpated from other areas of South America. The Rupununi's freshwater eco-regions are areas of exceptional species richness, comparable to that of the Amazonia. Flora and fauna flourish in the Rupununi river because of the Rupununi's isolation from human activity. During an expedition, the South Rupununi Biodiversity Assessment Team (BAT), described the Rupununi river as being "very diverse". "The Northern Rupununi has more than fourteen hundred species of vertebrates, more than twenty-eight hundred species of plants, and countless species of invertebrates" (Rupununi, Rediscovering a Lost World).

=== Birds ===
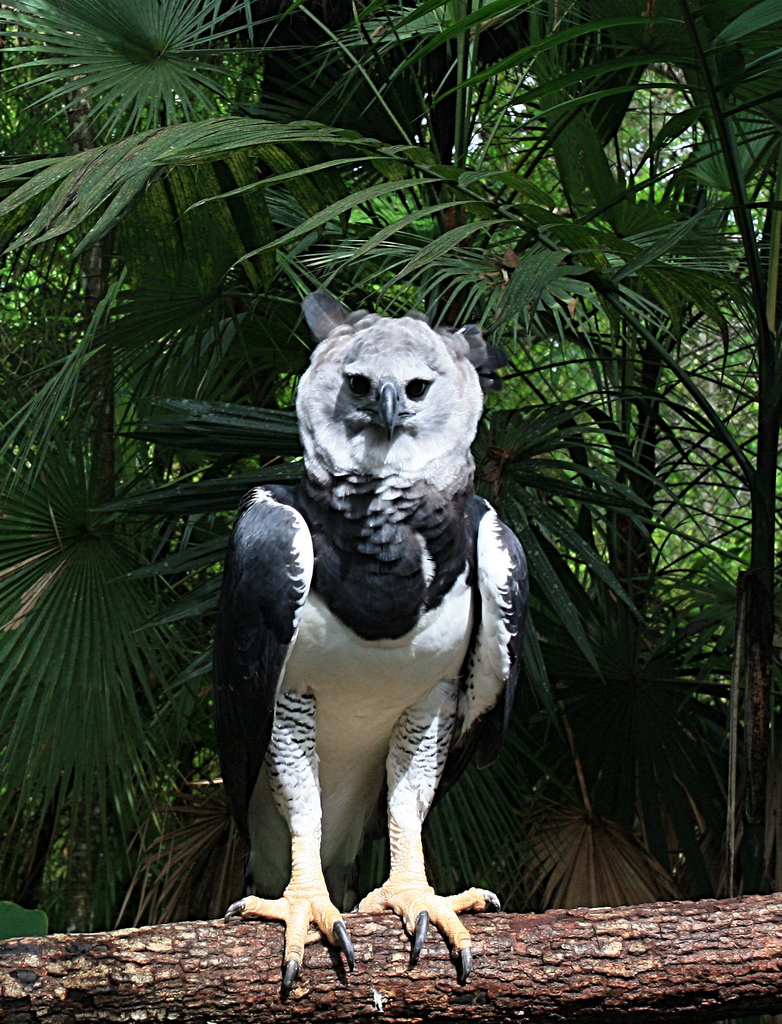
Adult Harpy Eagle

The largely undisturbed forest along the Rupununi River is a haven for birdlife. A biodiversity study conducted by BAT (South Rupununi Biodiversity Assessment Team) discovered a total of 306 bird species living along the river. Another avian-survey of the North Rupununi river, conducted by David C. Morimoto, Gajendra Nauth Narine, Michael D. Schindlinger and Asaph Wilson (DCM, MDS), showed that "4243 individuals, 292 species, and 58 families" of birds inhabited the Northern Rupununi river. Rare bird species that were found in the survey were the Crested Doradito and the Sun Parakeet. The Harpy Eagle also inhabits the Rupununi and is the largest aerial predator in South America. The critically endangered Red Siskin is one of the many species of bird that was rediscovered in the Rupununi river region. A 253,800 ha site in the south central Rupununi catchment has been designated an Important Bird Area (IBA) by BirdLife International because it supports a population of red siskins.

Notable species include:

- Harpy Eagle (Harpia harpyja)
- Red Siskin (Carduelis cucullata)
- Rufescent Tiger-Heron (Tigrisoma lineatum)
- Wattled Jacana (Jacana jacana)

=== Reptiles ===
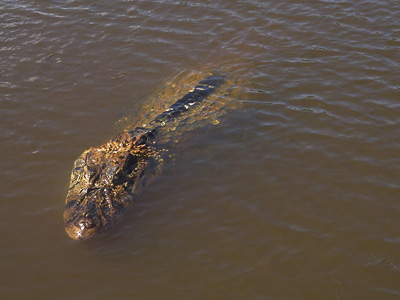
A swimming black caiman.

Reptiles thrive in the Rupununi river, preying on small fish and crustaceans. In another study conducted by the BAT (South Rupununi Biodiversity Assessment Team), it was discovered that 34 different species of reptiles were living along the river. The black caiman is the largest predator in the Rupununi, measuring up to 5 m long; however, it has become endangered due to hunting for their belly skins throughout the 1930s to 1970s.

Notable species include:

- Black caiman (Melanosuchus niger)
- Emerald tree boa (Corallus caninus)
- Green anaconda (Eunectes murinus)
- Red-footed tortoise (Chelonoidis carbonaria)
- Neotropical rattlesnake (Crotalus durissus)
- Giant River Turtle (Podocnemis expansa)

=== Large mammals ===
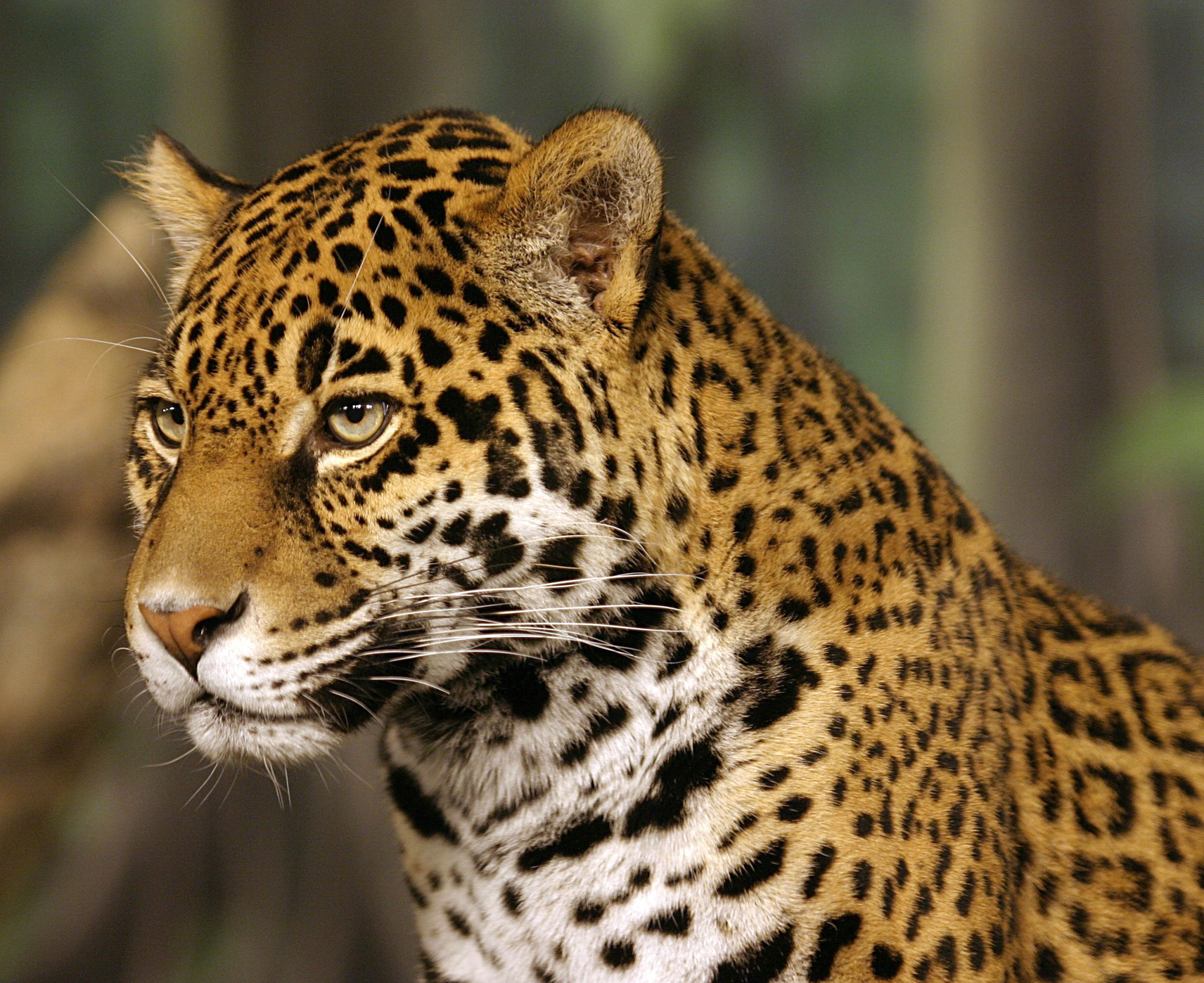
The elusive Jaguar

The Rupununi is home to relatively healthy populations of the South America's giant mammals, including the largest feline terrestrial predators, the jaguar and the puma. Both the jaguar and the puma are extremely elusive cats, adept at hunting anything from turtles to domesticated dogs. However they are seen as threats to livestock, and are hunted, which has ultimately resulted in a decline in their population numbers. Another large mammal that lives in the Rupununi is the giant otter, which is the largest otter in the world. Various species of primates and smaller terrestrial herbivores and insectivores such as the tapirs, also live and forage along the Rupununi river.

Notable species include:

- Jaguar (Panthera onca)
- Puma (Puma concolor)
- Giant Otter (Pteronura brasiliensis)
- Howler monkeys (Alouatta)
- Capybara (Hydrochoerus hydrochaeris)
- Giant Anteater (Myrmecophaga tridactyla)

=== Aquatic life ===
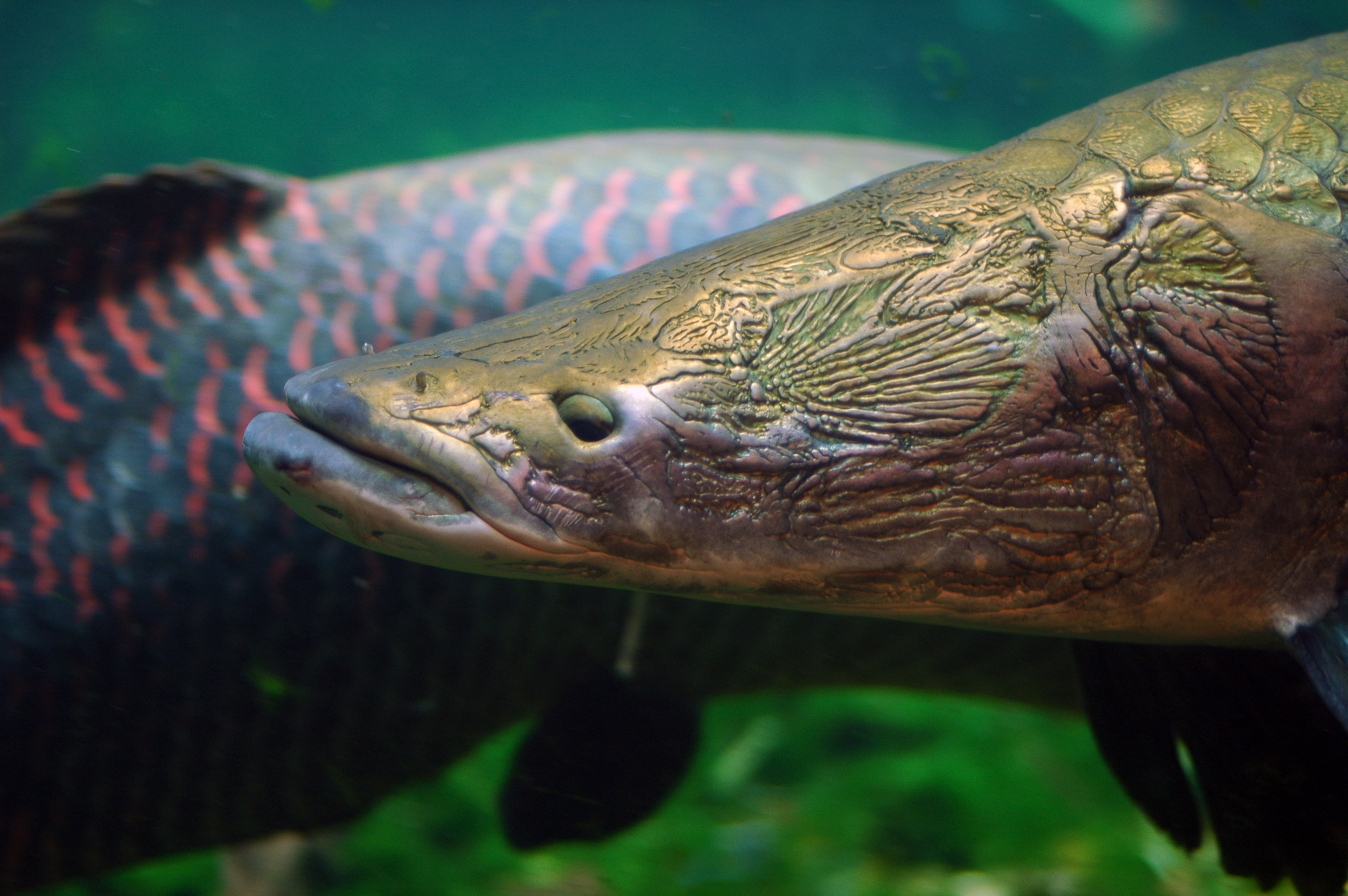
Arapaima close-up

The Rupununi has one of the most diverse aquatic ecosystems on the planet. A total of 410 species of fish inhabit the Rupununi, surpassing that of French Guiana (298 species) and Suriname (309 species). However, since there is a lack of freshwater fish taxonomists and researchers studying the area, it is estimated that there are at least 600 different species of fish in the Rupununi. Giants also lurk in the waters of the Rupununi. The arapaima (Arapaima) and the Lau-Lau (B. filamentosum) each measuring approximately 2, and in some exceptional cases 4 meters in length, have been found in the most remote corners of the Rupununi river. However, these river monsters are seldom seen and are rarely ever caught. Overexploitation and overfishing have forced these two species of fish to migrate deeper into unexplored territory in the Rupununi.

Notable species include:

- Arapaima (Arapaima)
- Lau-Lau (B. filamentosum)
- Red-Bellied Piranha (Pygocentrus nattereri)
- Lukanani, Butterfly Peacock Bass
- Redtail Catfish (Phractocephalus hemioliopterus)

== History ==
=== Precolonial civilization ===
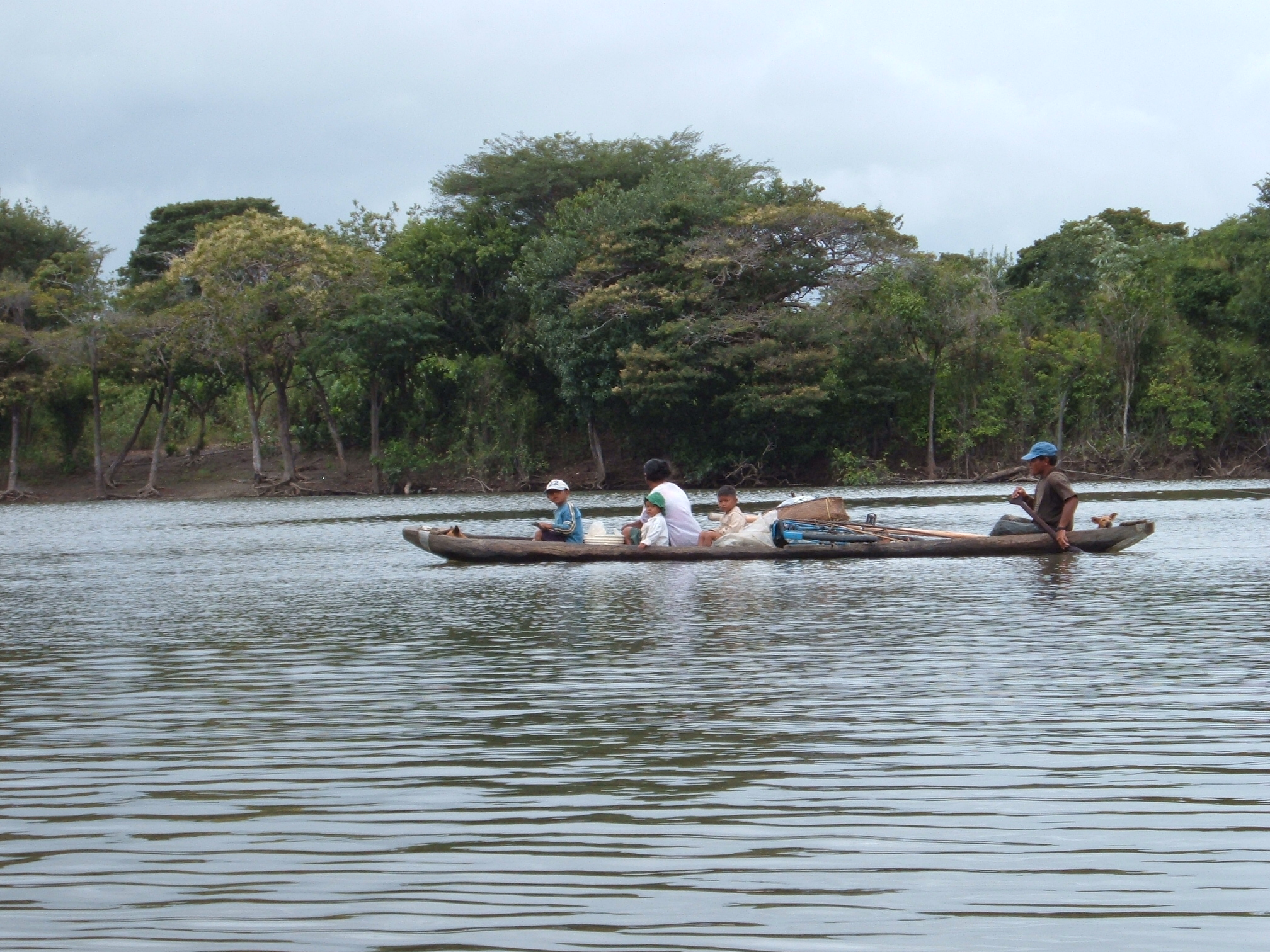
An Amerindian family traveling on the Rupununi River

Indigenous peoples have been part of the Rupununi landscape for millennia. Anthropologists have discovered Paleo-Indian petroglyphs, dated to be several thousands of years old along the course of the Rupununi river. Before the colonization of Guyana and the Rupununi region, the Makushi Amerindians, Wai-Wai and the Wapishana all inhabited the area. The Makushi migrated from what is now known as modern Brazil and Venezuela, to the northern areas of the Rupununi river, more than 400 years ago. The Makushi Amerindians continue to live in the Rio Branco savannahs and northern Rupununi, surviving off of the abundance of fish, wildlife, and forest resources of the area.

=== Age of European exploration ===
Sir Walter Raleigh claimed that the Rupununi was where the famed El Dorado was situated, however he never explored the river. Other early explorers such as Charles Waterton and Robert Schomburgk attempted to locate El Dorado, and successfully managed to visit the supposed location of the South American myth, which is in fact part of the northern Rupununi. However they never found El Dorado.

=== 20th-century development ===
Guyana is a developing country that lacks sustainable economic, environmental, and investment growth. Exploiting the Rupununi's resources through corporate agriculture, mining, and petroleum extraction are potential pathways that Guyana could undertake. Extant roads such as the one connecting the Rupununi and the state of Roraima are being upgraded to travel all the way to Georgetown. A bridge has also been constructed on the Guyana-Brazil border that links Lethem (Guyana) to Bonfim (Brazil). This infrastructure will facilitate the transportation of goods throughout the area; however, it poses a threat to the Rupununi's fragile ecosystem.

In order to formally protect the Rupununi's ecosystem, NGO's and the Guyanese government have partnered up to attempt to enforce legislation to ban any prejudicial human activity towards the environment and wildlife in the Rupununi.

==== Ecotourism and adventure tourism ====
Ecotourism in the Rupununi is an important part of Guyana's economy, especially for the local Amerindian people. There are many ranches and lodges such as the Karanambu Ranch, a protected area for giant otters and other endangered species in the Rupununi, started by Tiny McTurk (1927), that generate revenue from tourists visiting the Rupununi. Near to Karanambu is the ecolodge Caiman House, a social enterprise that drives revenue to a public library, raising the pass rate into secondary school from near-zero in 2005 to 86% in 2019.

Conservation International host a website on the Rupununi that includes details of ecotourism accommodation. Some tourists travel overland from Georgetown to Lethem via the Rupununi and on to Brazil, but the travel is very slow in the rainy season when the dirt roads degrade, and may be impossible. Rock View Lodge and The Pakaraima Mountain Inn are both near Annai 3 to 5 hours from Lethem. The Rupununi / Lethem Rodeo is a tourist attraction at Easter (during the dry season).

== See also ==
- List of rivers of Guyana
- Rappu Falls
- Rupununi Uprising
