= Wapishana =

Indigenous people of Brazil

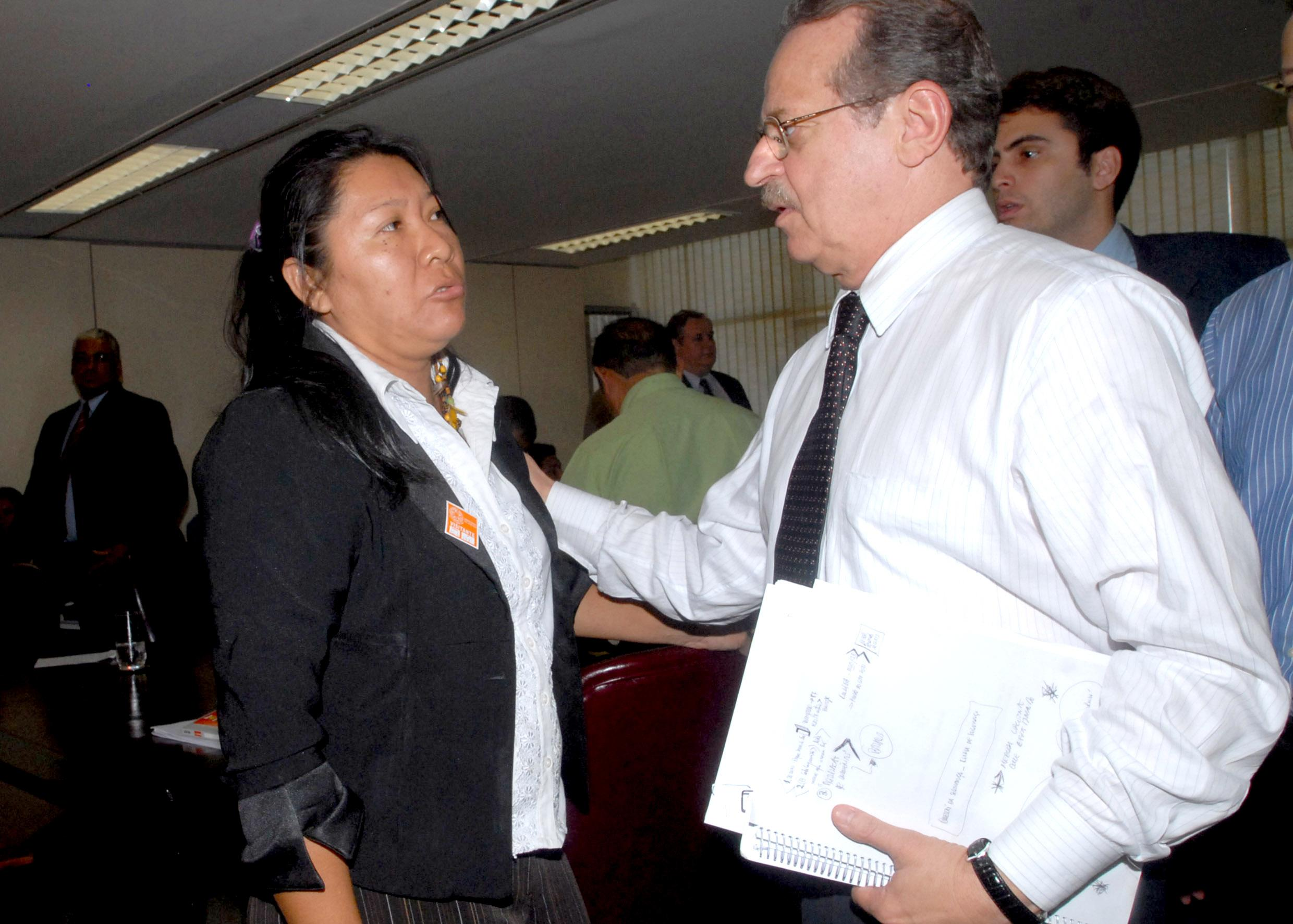
- Joenia Wapichana and Minister Genro at the Indigenous Council of Roraima (2008)

Total population
- 15,500

Regions with significant populations
- Brazil: 9,441
- Guyana: 6,000
- Venezuela: 37

Languages
- Wapishana; Various local languages

Religion
- Animism, Christianity

The Wapishana or Wapichan (or Wapisiana, Wapitxana, Vapidiana, Wapixana) are an Indigenous group found in the Roraima area of northern Brazil and southern Guyana.

== Location ==
Currently the Wapishana are located in the State of Roraima, Brazil, northern and eastern Boa Vista, as well as in the southern Rupununi savannas of Guyana. In their villages, one can find ranches, settlements, small towns, and commercial developments of Brazilians. In Guyana, the Wapishana villages are located between the Takutu, Rupununi, and Kwitaro rivers, bordering the Macushi territory in the Kanuku Mountains to the north, and extending as far as the Wai-Wai territory to the south. In Brazilian territory, in the north eastern portion of Roraima, the Wapishana villages are mostly located in the Serra da Lua (Moon Ridge) region between the Branco River and one of its affluent, the Tacutu. On the lower Uraricoera River, another affluent of the Branco, most of the villages contain a mixed population of Wapishana and Macushi.

Historical boundaries extend as far up as the Rio Branco basin, but the Wapishana were driven south by the Macushi under pressure by European colonizers.

== Demographics ==
Wapishana population totals around 9,441 in Brazil (2014 estimate), 6,000 in Guyana (1990 estimate), and 37 in Venezuela (2011 estimate).

Previous population estimates were between 10,000 and 11,000 people in 1997, approximately 5,000 Wapishana in Southern Rupununi, southern area of Guyana bordering Brazil in 1991, and only 2,995 Wapishana in twenty Brazilian villages estimated by the Fundação Nacional do Índio in 1984.

== Language ==
Wapishana is classified as a member of the Arawak language family. Wapishana is the only remaining Arawakan language in the circum-Roraima area. The term Arawak is more generally used to refer to the Arawakan or Lokono languages spoken in Venezuela, Guyana, Suriname, French Guiana and in some of the Antilles Islands. Most Brazilian Wapishana often speak Portuguese, instead of Wapishana and many Guyanese Wapishana speak English in addition to Wapishana. Portuguese is the dominant language among the Wapishana who live in urban areas that are bilingual in Portuguese and Wapishana, especially among the younger generations. According to Migliazza, more than 80% of Wapishana can speak the national language with which they are in contact, Portuguese in Brazil or English in Guyana. Since someone can cross the border between the two countries so easily, it is common to find people who speak Portuguese and English, as well as the maternal language.

== History ==
The Wapishana's first indirect contact with Europeans was in 1498, Columbus's third voyage, which reached the coast of South America. Information and objects were quickly exchanged through developed Indigenous networks of trade. The Portuguese initially attacked the Indigenous population, who then occupied the Branco River, in Brazil, on slave-raiding expeditions. Village settlements were later settled there at the end of the century. The Wapishana were brought to work at the Portuguese fort on the Rio Branco by the late 1700s.

== Settlements ==
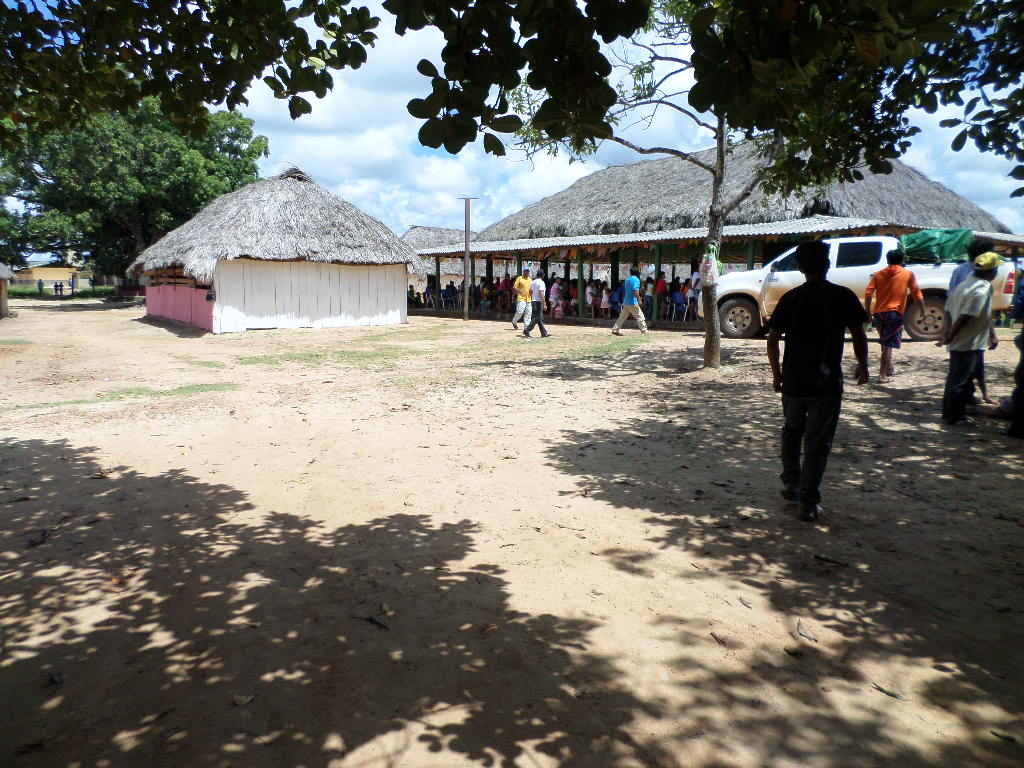
The village of Jacamim in Bonfim, Roraima

Early Wapishana settlements were temporary clusters of homes, but this has changed since the twentieth century, with permanent villages usually surrounding a church. The government has provided schools, meeting houses, and even shops to village centers. Villagers meet, usually at the church or in school to discuss local issues and make plans. After these meetings, men frequently play soccer in open areas nearby In some places, the Wapishana have customarily preferred to live in the open country, at some distance to their agricultural areas. Structures may be built by these farms for food processing, and while a small number of families live on their farms, it is not looked upon well by others in the community.

The Brazilian government organized Wapishana villages, but has not yet separated Wapishana lands; every village is enclosed. Although The Wapishana people are limited to smaller spaces, they do not believe in the private ownership of land, they demonstrate flexibility in the assignment of house and garden space. Before settling in an area, newcomers must make sure they have permission from villagers. In Brazil, Wapishana villages contain an average population of 150 inhabitants, while on the other hand the number of inhabitants is higher for villages in Guyana, which average around 500 inhabitants.

== Economy ==
The Wapishana material culture is similar to other nearly peoples such as the Pemon, Kapon, and Wai-wai. Cassava is an important crop for the Wapishana society. "Wapisiana women grate the cassava, express its juice, sieve it, and then toast it on iron griddles into flour", basically thick flat breads, also locally called "Beiju". They also farm sweet potatoes and other roots, squashes, tomatoes, greens, onions, dozens of different kinds of hot peppers, and numerous other crops. Wapishana men are in charge of hunting deer, agouti, wild turkeys, and birds. Everyone in the family goes fishing. Wapishana raise cattle, swine, chickens, ducks, and many other animals that have been introduced in the past 200 years, and have since become a part of the regular diet. The exchange of produce, animals, and homemade food provides smalls amounts of cash for purchases of store-bought food and household goods.

Wapishana men craft wooden stools and baskets, sieves, and squeezers for use in the preparation of cassava and other foods. They also make arrows, fencing wire into points, but these arrows and bows they buy or get hold of from other Indians have been almost entirely replaced by shotguns. Women make clay cooking pots and spin cotton and weave the thread into baby slings and hammocks. Introduced crafts include needlework, dressmaking, and rustic furniture making.

Peddlers sometimes try to trade with the Wapishana, but these transactions are described as exploitative, and they are avoided by all but those who are too isolated to understand.

== Culture ==
=== Religion ===
Traditionally, certain Wapishana men became specialists in healing; they beat leaves and "blew" cures. They could also use the same techniques to make people sick or to kill them. Now, no Wapishana admits to these rituals and only a small number actually follow them, but a number of men and women do perform a sort of curing that is influenced by Catholicism, northeastern Brazilian folk medicine, and other non-Indian practices. In most villages, a Wapishana man is the catechist who leads the Sunday service in the absence of a priest.

=== Marriage and family ===
Polygyny once practiced by leaders has nearly disappeared, possibly from the pressure missionaries put on them. Most marriages are now consecrated by a Catholic priest. Divorce is not uncommon and is initiated by either spouse. A village leader may get involved and try to convince a couple to stay together. The nuclear family along with a grandparent is the common arrangement in a household. Often a man who is leader will surround his large house with smaller homes for his sons' and daughters' families. As an essential part of their way of life, young children act as a companion to adults. They stay with their mothers and help with house and garden work.

By tradition, men have control over the labor of their wives and daughters, unmarried sons, and younger sons-in-law in their households. Married daughters usually build their house close to their maternal house. They raise their children alongside their own mother, sharing food and labor.

=== Death ===
Deaths were recognized to evil spirits or to kanaima, who were healers that had evil intentions and solely used their powers for that reason. Kanaima are considered evil, acting out of envy to kill those who are wiser, beloved and more fortunate. Contemporary Wapishana describe illnesses hepatitis, malaria, and pneumonia to identify causes of death, but they often still believe that the true cause is kanaima or another malevolent spirit. Kinship and social cooperation of a tribe's members indicates that the concept of Kainaima is associated with outsiders, or enemies of the social group.

A person's prized possessions are buried with them in the Wapishana culture for use in the afterlife.

== Wapishana relations with other groups ==
The Wapishana have been known for their distrust of outsiders. This is reflected in their relationships with other tribes. "Their relationship with their closest neighbors, the Macushi, has traditionally been one of suspicion and mistrust". In 1929, a marriage was reported between a Wapishana man and a Macushi woman and today there are a few mixed marriages in the Kanaku Mountains area of Guyana. A number of coastal Lokono are settled in Wapishana communities, they are mostly schoolteachers from Moruca area in northwest Guyana, their relationships with Indigenous inhabitants can involve some tension, despite the fact that mixed marriages are more accepted now. There has been a drastic change in the relationship of the Rupununi area with the coast recently with the completion of road between Georgetown and Lethem, which leads to Roraima's state capital, Boa Vista.

=== In Brazil ===
Since the earliest days of European contact with the Wapishana, the political situation in Brazil has been different from the one in Guyana. According to Henfry, the Brazilian state of Roraima includes 23 Wapishana villages, which actually all include large non-Wapishana and mixed-race populations. The ancestors of these people were the first of Roraima's Indigenous population to encounter European explorers, who gained access to the area from time to time throughout the 18th century. A slight government interference before the mid-20th century left effective political control in the hands of cattle ranchers. By the 1970s it was reported that 60% of Brazil's Wapishana and Atorai were integrated, speaking Portuguese as their first language, and the rest were mostly bilingual and in permanent contact with the state.

=== In Guyana ===
The main difference between the Brazilian and Guyanese Wapishana is their rights to land. In Guyana, Amerindian villages are state elected administrative units but there is nothing relating to the reservation system and villages are in remote areas. Although the situation of Guyanese Wapishana is better than most part of the Brazilian population of Wapishana, it is still far from perfect. Entirely, Amerindians are the least privileged group of Guyanese society. Among their problems are health and education, unfortunately the Rupununi region is one of those Amerindian populations that are particularly suffering from these problems, according to a study demonstrated by the ARU.

== See also ==
- Indigenous peoples in Brazil
- Indigenous peoples in Guyana
