= List of airports in Guyana =

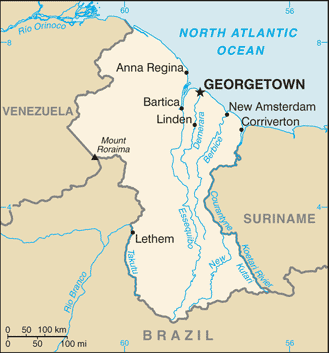
Map of Guyana

This is a list of airports in Guyana, sorted by location.

== Airports ==
Airport names shown in bold have scheduled passenger service on commercial airlines.

City served / location	Region	ICAO	IATA	Airport name	Comments
Aishalton	Upper Takutu-Upper Essequibo	SYAH	AHL	Aishalton Airport	
Annai	Upper Takutu-Upper Essequibo	SYAN	NAI	Annai Airport	
Apoteri	Upper Takutu-Upper Essequibo	SYAP		Apoteri Airport	
Awarewaunau (Awaruwaunawa)	Upper Takutu-Upper Essequibo	SYAW		Awaruwaunau Airport	
Baramita	Barima-Waini	SYBR	BMJ	Baramita Airport	
Bartica	Cuyuni-Mazaruni	SYBT	GFO	Bartica Airport	
	Barima-Waini	SYBE	BCG	Bemichi Airport	
Ebini	Upper Demerara-Berbice	SYEB		Ebini Airport	
Ekereku	Cuyuni-Mazaruni		EKE	Ekereku Airport	
Georgetown	Demerara-Mahaica	SYCJ	GEO	**Cheddi Jagan International Airport**	Main airport.
Georgetown/Ogle	Demerara-Mahaica	SYEC	OGL	**Eugene F. Correia International Airport**	
Good Hope	Pomeroon-Supenaam	SYGH		Good Hope Airport	
Imbaimadai	Cuyuni-Mazaruni	SYIB	IMB	Imbaimadai Airport	
Kaieteur National Park	Potaro-Siparuni	SYKA	KAI	**Kaieteur International Airport**	
Kamarang	Cuyuni-Mazaruni	SYKM	KAR	Kamarang Airport	
Kaow Island	Cuyuni-Mazaruni	SYKI		Kaow Island Airport	
Karanambo	Upper Takutu-Upper Essequibo	SYKR	KRM	Karanambo Airport	
Karasabai	Upper Takutu-Upper Essequibo	SYKS	KRG	Karasabai Airport	
Kato	Potaro-Siparuni	SYKT	KTO	Kato Airport	
Konawaruk	Potaro-Siparuni		KKG	Konawaruk Airport	
Kurukabaru	Potaro-Siparuni	SYKK		Kurukabaru Airport	
Kurupung	Cuyuni-Mazaruni		KPG	Kurupung Airport	
Kwakwani	Upper Demerara-Berbice	SYKW		Kwakwani Airport	
Lethem	Upper Takutu-Upper Essequibo	SYLT	LTM	**Lethem Airport**	
Linden	Upper Demerara-Berbice	SYLD		Linden Airport	
Lumid Pau (Lumidpau)	Upper Takutu-Upper Essequibo	SYLP	LUB	Lumid Pau Airport	
Mabaruma	Barima-Waini	SYMB	USI	Mabaruma Airport	
Mahdia	Potaro-Siparuni	SYMD	MHA	Mahdia Airport	
Maikwak	Potaro-Siparuni		VEG	Maikwak Airport	
Manari	Barima-Waini	SYMN		Manari Airport	
Maruranau (Maruranawa)	Upper Takutu-Upper Essequibo	SYMW		Maruranawa Airport	
Matthews Ridge	Barima-Waini	SYMR	MWJ	Matthews Ridge Airport	
Monkey Mountain	Potaro-Siparuni	SYMM	MYM	Monkey Mountain Airport	
Mountain Point	Upper Takutu-Upper Essequibo	SYMP		Mountain Point Airport	
New Amsterdam	East Berbice-Corentyne	SYNA		New Amsterdam Airport	
Orinduik	Potaro-Siparuni	SYOR	ORJ	Orinduik Airport	
Paramakatoi	Potaro-Siparuni	SYPM	PMT	Paramakatoi Airport	
Paruima	Cuyuni-Mazaruni	SYPR	PRR	Paruima Airport	
Pipillipai	Cuyuni-Mazaruni		PIQ	Pipillipai Airport	
Port Kaituma	Barima-Waini	SYPK	PKM	Port Kaituma Airport	
Sand Creek	Upper Takutu-Upper Essequibo	SYSC	SDC	Sand Creek Airport	
Skeldon	East Berbice-Corentyne		SKM	Skeldon Airport	Owned by Guyana Sugar Corporation.
Wichabai	Upper Takutu-Upper Essequibo	SYWI		Wichabai Airport	

== See also ==
- Transport in Guyana
- List of airports by ICAO code: S#SY - Guyana
- Wikipedia: WikiProject Aviation/Airline destination lists: South America#Guyana
