= Roraima Airways =

Regional airline in Guyana

IATA	ICAO	Call sign
-	ROR	RORAIMA
- Founded: 1992
- Hubs: Eugene F. Correia International Airport
- Secondary hubs: Cheddi Jagan International Airport
- Fleet size: 6
- Parent company: Roraima Group of Companies
- Headquarters: Guyana
- Key people: Gerald Gouveia
- Website: http://www.roraimaairways.com

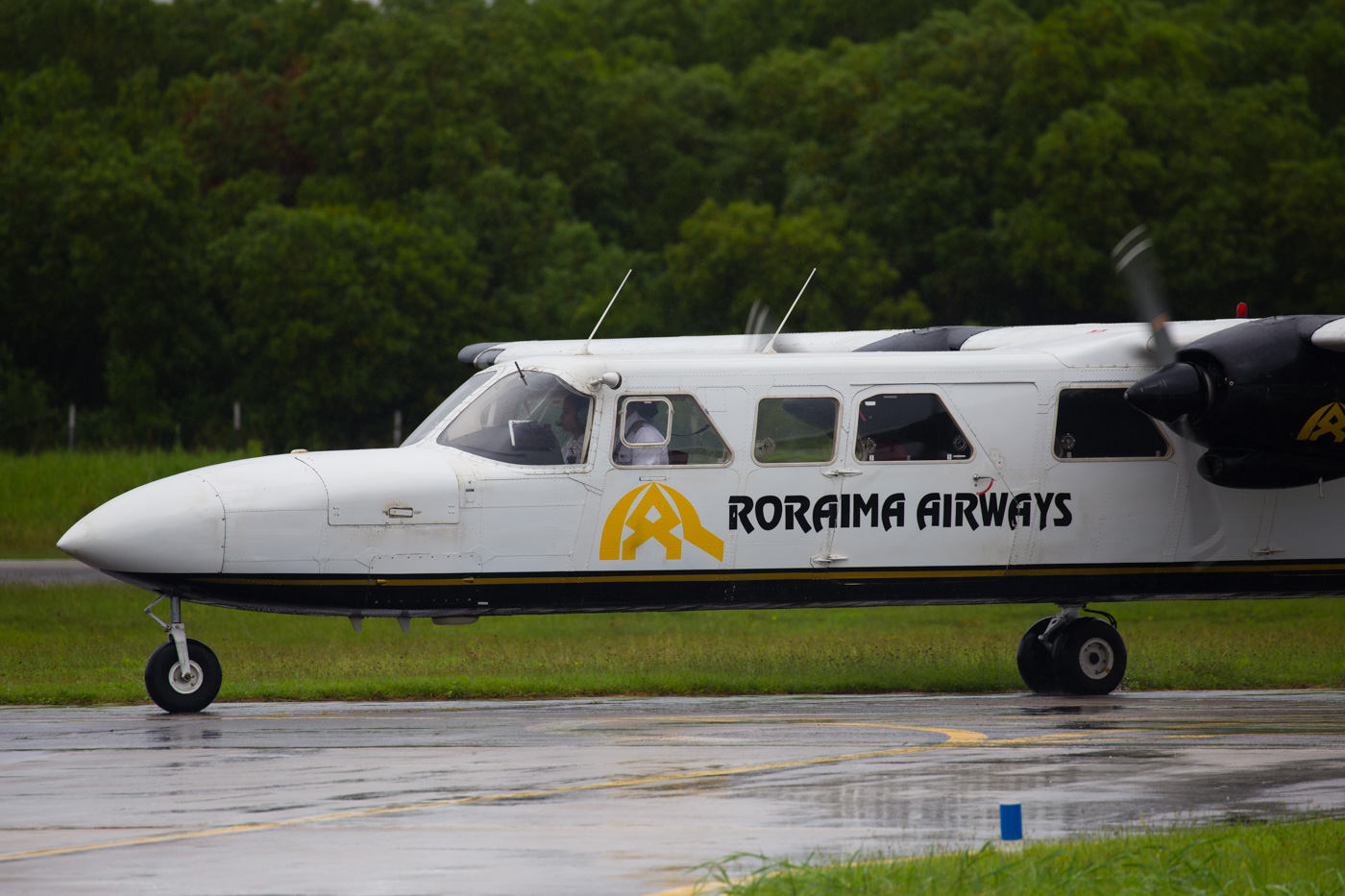
Britten-Norman Trislander operated by Roraima Airways

Roraima Airways is a regional airline of Guyana with its main hub at the Eugene F. Correia International Airport. Roraima Airways was founded in 1992, and is named after Mount Roraima.

== History ==
Roraima Airways was founded in 1992 to serve tourists to get them around Guyana to destinations like Kaieteur Falls, and also Mount Roraima. All flights begin or end at Georgetown's Cheddi Jagan International Airport or Eugene F. Correia International Airport. In addition to tourist flights, the airline provides charter services for passengers and cargo to practically any aerodrome in Guyana's Interior as well as critical Medivac services both locally and internationally.

== Destinations ==
Brazil

- Boa Vista
- Normandia

Guyana

- Aurora Gold Mine
- Baramita
- Eteringbang Mine
- Georgetown-Cheddi Jagan
- Georgetown-Ogle
- Kaieteur Falls
- Lethem
- Linden
- Mabaruma
- Mahdia
- Matthews Ridge
- Orinduik Falls
- Port Kaituma

Trinidad and Tobago

- Port of Spain (3 cargo flights per week on behalf of FedEx)

== Fleet ==
- 1 BN Islander twin engine aircraft
- 2 BN Trislander triple engine aircraft
- 3 Tecnam P2012 twin engine aircraft
