= Mabaruma Airport =

Airport in Guyana

- IATA: USI; ICAO: SYMB; WMO: 81100

Summary
- Airport type: Public
- Serves: Mabaruma, Guyana
- Elevation AMSL: 102 ft / 31 m
- Coordinates: 8°12′05″N 59°46′35″W

Map
- Location in Guyana

Runways
Direction	Length		Surface
Direction	m	ft	Surface
05/23	518	1,699	Asphalt
- Sources: HERE Maps SkyVector GCM

Mabaruma Airport (IATA: USI, ICAO: SYMB) is an airport serving the town of Mabaruma, capital of the Barima-Waini Region of Guyana.

Mabaruma Airport is located in the Hobo hill area of Mabaruma. It has two daily flights into Mabaruma every day of the week. It also has an afternoon flight every Wednesday. The two airlines that come in from Georgetown are Trans Guyana Airways and Air Service Guyana. The flight from Mabaruma Airport to Georgetown's Eugene F. Correia International Airport (formerly Ogle Airport) is roughly one hour.

In 2019 a new flight was included when Roraima Airways agreed to fly three times a week to Mabaruma.

The airport is also served by US missionary group Wings for Humanity.

== See also ==
- List of airports in Guyana
- Transport in Guyana
