= Kaieteur Airport =

Airport in Guyana

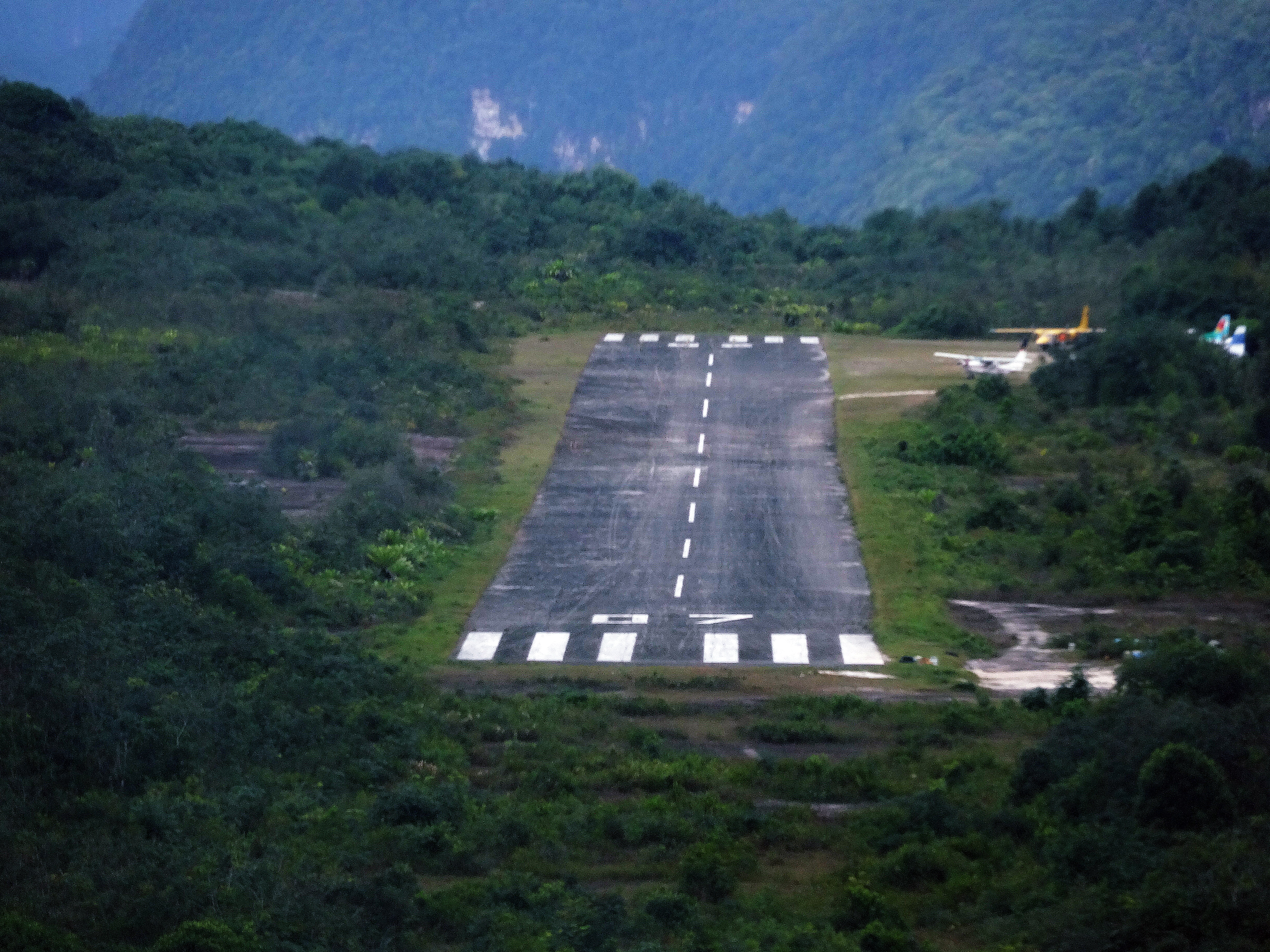
- IATA: KAI; ICAO: SYKA

Summary
- Airport type: Public
- Operator: Guyana Civil Aviation Authority (GCAA)
- Serves: Kaieteur National Park, Guyana
- Elevation AMSL: 1,520 ft / 463 m
- Coordinates: 5°10′40″N 59°29′15″W

Map
- Location of the airport in Guyana

Runways
Direction	Length		Surface
Direction	m	ft	Surface
07/25	615	2,018	Asphalt
- Sources: GCM Bing Maps

Kaieteur Airport (IATA: KAI, ICAO: SYKA) is an airport serving Kaieteur National Park in the Potaro-Siparuni region of Guyana.

The airport is less than 1 kilometre (0.62 mi) west of Kaieteur Falls, among the largest single-drop waterfalls in the world.

== Airlines and destinations ==
Airlines	Destinations
Roraima Airways	Georgetown–Cheddi Jagan, Georgetown–Ogle
Trans Guyana Airways	Georgetown–Ogle

== See also ==
- Transport in Guyana
- List of airports in Guyana
