= Gerry Gouveia =

Guyanese pilot and politician

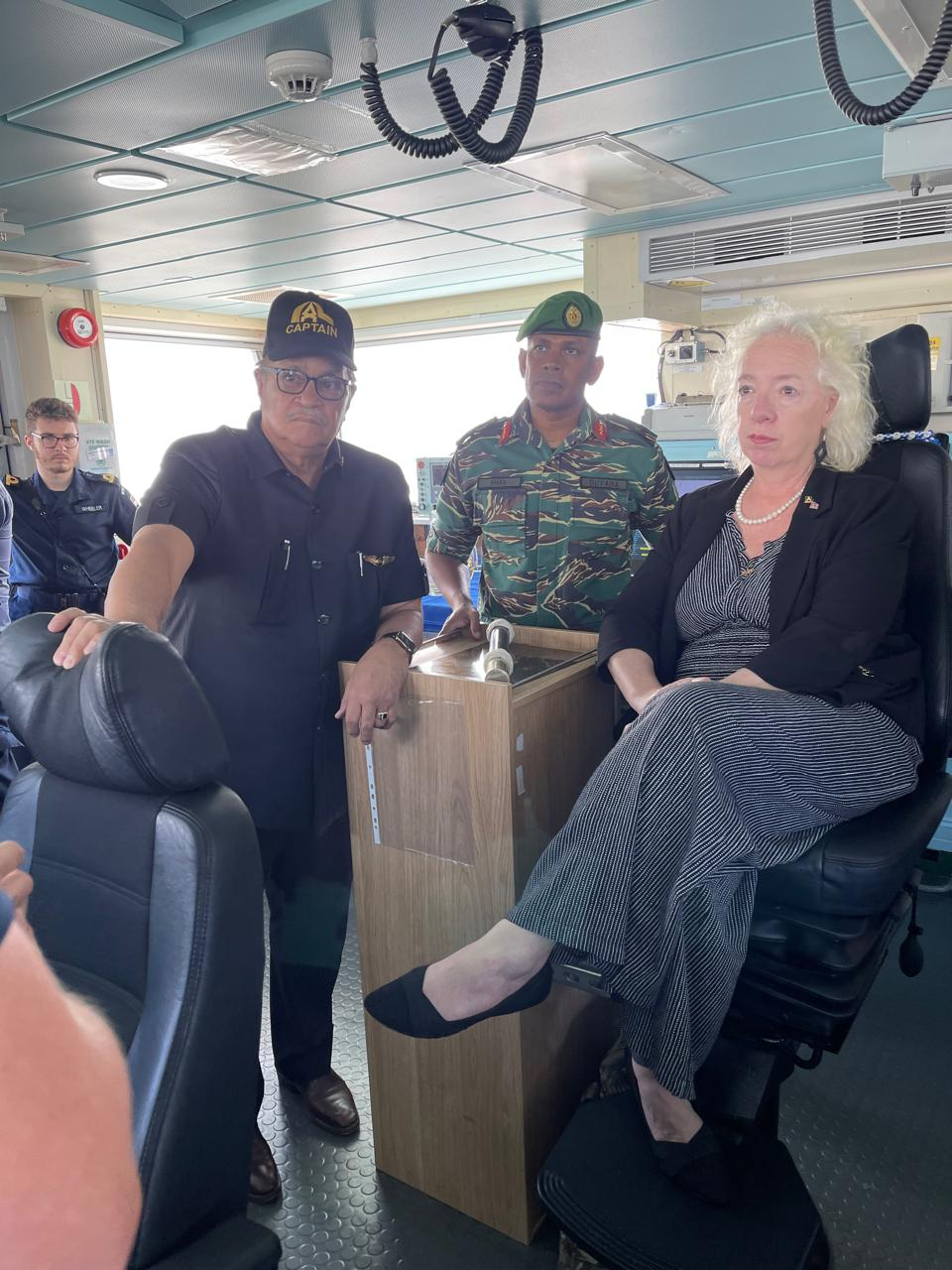
- Gerry Gouveia
- Born: Gerald Gouveia; 1955 or 1956 (age 70–71)
- Other name: Gerry
- Education: Embry Riddle Aeronautical University
- Occupations: Pilot, businessman, politician
- Known for: founder and CEO of Roraima Airways; National Security Advisor to the President of Guyana
- Spouse: Debra Gouveia
- Children: 1

Gerald "Gerry" Gouveia, Sr. (born 1955 or 1956) is a Guyanese pilot, airline administrator and politician. He is the founder and CEO of Roraima Airways and its holding company Roraima Group, and the current national security advisor to the President of Guyana. He is also one of five shareholders in Ogle Airport Inc., which holds ownership of Eugene F. Correia International Airport.

== Biography ==
Gouveia is Portuguese Guyanese. Gouveia graduated from Embry Riddle Aeronautical University in Daytona Beach, Florida, having received a scholarship from the Government of Guyana to attend. He also attended courses at NTSB Academy, George Washington University, and the William J. Perry Center for Hemispheric Defense Studies. Gouveia is a fellow at the National Defense University.

Gouveia served for more than a decade in the Guyana Defence Force (GDF), where he served as the Chief Pilot of the Army Air corps. He attained the rank of Major. Whilst a pilot in the GDF, Gouveia was one of the first people to arrive in Port Kaituma in the aftermath of the Jonestown massacre, and was actively involved in assisting survivors and transporting the bodies of the dead. As a part of this, Gouveia transported future congresswoman Jackie Speier when she urgently required medical attention following her injury at the Port Kaituma airstrip. He also transported journalists to Jonestown. In 2014, Gouveia was brought to testify at a Commission of Inquiry into the death of Walter Rodney in 1980. Gouveia may have piloted a plane carrying Gregory Smith to Kwakwani after the death of Rodney (Smith was accused of giving Rodney the car bomb that led to his death). Smith escaped to French Guiana, where he died in 2002.

After leaving the GDF, Gouveia moved to Canada, and became a flight instructor in Montreal. He returned to Guyana in the early 1990s to work for Golden Star Resources, a Canadian mining company.

Gouveia founded Roraima Airways in 1992 with his wife Debra. Roraima Group, the holding company for Roraima Airways, also holds ownership of a travel agency, airport operations services, two hotels and a nature resort. In September 1994, Gouveia was involved in a plane crash. Gouveia survived with light injuries.

Gouveia has been the president of multiple organisations in Guyana, including the Tourism and Hospitality Association of Guyana (THAG), The Guyana Association of Travel Agents (GATA), The Georgetown Chamber of Commerce & Industry (GCCI), The Caribbean Association of Travel Agents (CATA), and the National Air Transport Association (NATA).

Gouveia was elected as chairman of Guyana's private sector commission in 2019, and occupied the position previously in addition. In August 2020, Gouveia was appointed as a national security advisor to President Irfaan Ali, stepping down as chairman of the private sector commission. In 2021, Gouveia was named as the new head of the Guyana Prison Service Sentence Management Board. Gouveia has served as Honorary consul of Barbados to Guyana.

== Personal life ==
Gouveia is married to Debra Gouveia, who is also a pilot. He has a son, Gerald Gouveia Jr., who is also a pilot and an executive of Roraima Airways.

== Awards and recognition ==
Gouveia has been awarded The Golden Arrow of Achievement by the Government of Guyana. He was awarded Tourism Entrepreneur of the year in 2016 by the Guyana Tourism Association.
