= Mountain Point Airport =

Airport in Guyana

- IATA: none; ICAO: SYMP

Summary
- Serves: Sand Creek
- Elevation AMSL: 400 ft / 122 m
- Coordinates: 2°59′55″N 59°37′50″W

Map
- Location in Guyana

Runways
Direction	Length		Surface
Direction	m	ft	Surface
09/27	1,550	5,085	Grass
- Sources: Google Maps GCM

Mountain Point Airport (ICAO: SYMP) is an airport in the Upper Takutu-Upper Essequibo Region of Guyana. The nearest community is Sand Creek (13 km/8.1 miles east).

== See also ==
- List of airports in Guyana
- Transport in Guyana
