= List of airlines of Guyana =

== Active ==
This is a list of airlines which have an Air Operator Certificate issued by the Civil Aviation Authority of Guyana.

Airline	Image	IATA	ICAO	Callsign	Founded	Hub(s)	Notes
Air Demerara					2019	Cheddi Jagan International Airport	Planned
Air Guyana			WOL		1984	Cheddi Jagan International Airport	Formerly named Wings Aviation Limited
Air Services Limited					1978	Ogle Aerodrome, Ogle, East Coast Demerara	
Jags Aviation					2006	Eugene F. Correia International Airport	
Laparkan Airlines		LE			1995	Cheddi Jagan International Airport	
Roraima Airways			ROR	RORAIMA	1991	Cheddi Jagan International Airport	
Trans Guyana Airways			TGY	TRANS GUYANA	1956	Eugene F. Correia International Airport	

== Defunct ==
Airline	Image	IATA	ICAO	Callsign	Founded	Ceased operations	Notes
EZjet Air Services			EZJ		2011	2012	
Golden Arrow Airways					2014	2014	
Guyana Air 2000		GY	GYA		1999	2001	
Guyana Airways		GY	GYA	GUYAIR	1939	1999	Rebranded as Guyana Air 2000
Universal Airlines		UW	UVG	GUYANA JET	2001	2005	

== See also ==
- List of defunct airlines of Guyana
- List of airlines
