= Eduard Alexander Gummels Airport =

Eduard Alexander Gummels International Airport
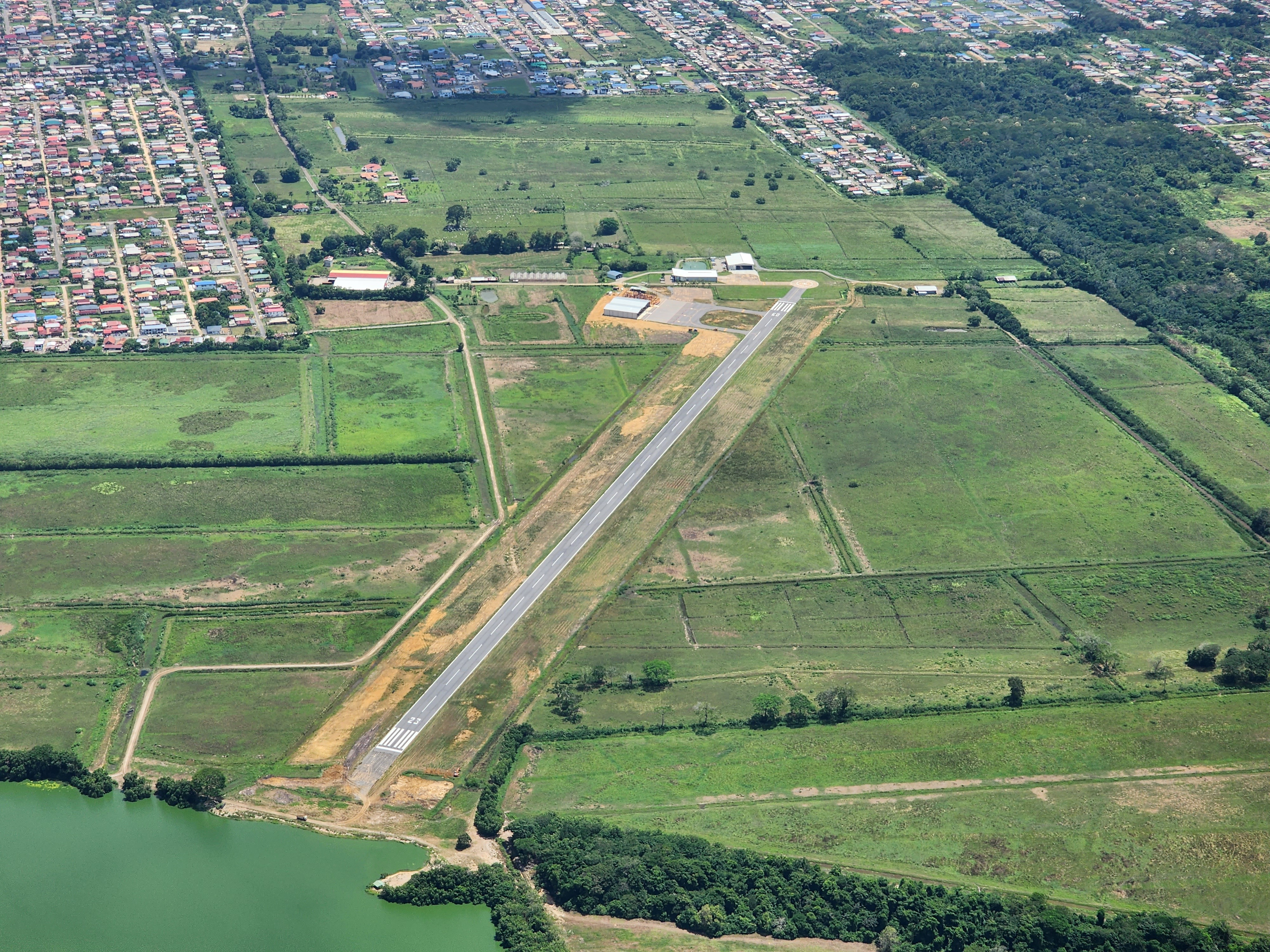
- IATA: EAX; ICAO: SMEG

Summary
- Airport type: Private
- Owner: EAG Airport Management
- Location: Kwatta, Suriname
- Coordinates: 5.8567°N 55.1930°W
- Website: http://www.eagairport.sr/

Map
- Location in Suriname

Runways
| Direction | Length | | Surface |
| Direction | m | ft | Surface |
|---|---|---|---|
| 05/23 | 1,199 | 3,934 | Asphalt |
- Sources: Google Maps

Eduard Alexander Gummels International Airport (IATA: EAX, ICAO: SMEG) is an airport at the north of Paramaribo in Suriname. The official opening as an international airport took place in March 2025.

The airport started as Gummels Heliport Paramaribo (ICAO: SMHP) and was later renamed to Eduard Alexander Gummels International Airport (SMEG). It has been the first dedicated Heliport built in Suriname in 2015 at the Gummelsweg in the neighborhood of Kwatta near the city of Paramaribo, Suriname. Privately owned and used by the Gummels family who also own the Gum Air airline and the crop dust service Surinam Sky Farmers. The heliport is mainly used for helicopter charters and primarily for offshore development activities. At the opening of the heliport in 2015 one hangar was built, but this was soon expanded by a second hangar at the heliport in 2017. By 2022 due to the expanding operations the addition of two more hangars was accomplished. With the increasing number of flights, reaching a peak of approximately 20 heli flights in a single day with 5 helicopters, limitations on the existing space were encountered at the heliport. During this period the idea of developing an airport from the small gravel crop dusters airstrip at Kwatta took root.

The Gummels family, in a public-private partnership with the Government of Suriname, has constructed a new 1,200 meter runway at this Gummels Heliport Paramaribo that was completed in 2025. The new airport has officially been opened as of the 24th of March 2025. EAG Airport Management is the operator of both the Heliport Paramaribo and the new Eduard Alexander Gummels Airport. EAG Airport Management is a sister Company of Surinam Sky Farmers N.V. and Gum Air N.V. and mainly facilitates offshore helicopter operations serving the Petrol hydrocarbon industry. The Gum Air airline utilizes their Cessna Grand Caravans, DHC6 Twin Otters, and their new Beechcraft 1900D for flights between Paramaribo, Georgetown, Port of Spain, and Cayenne. The new airport mainly supports the hydrocarbon (oil & gas) and cargo sectors with charter flights from 2024 on. Currently approximately 800 helicopter flights are carried out annually from this heliport in Suriname, this is including training, evacuation, search and rescue, medical and passenger flights.

The hopes the government of Suriname has for the airport is that it will help Suriname achieve its Sustainable Development Goals (SDGs) by increasing tourism and easing local trade.

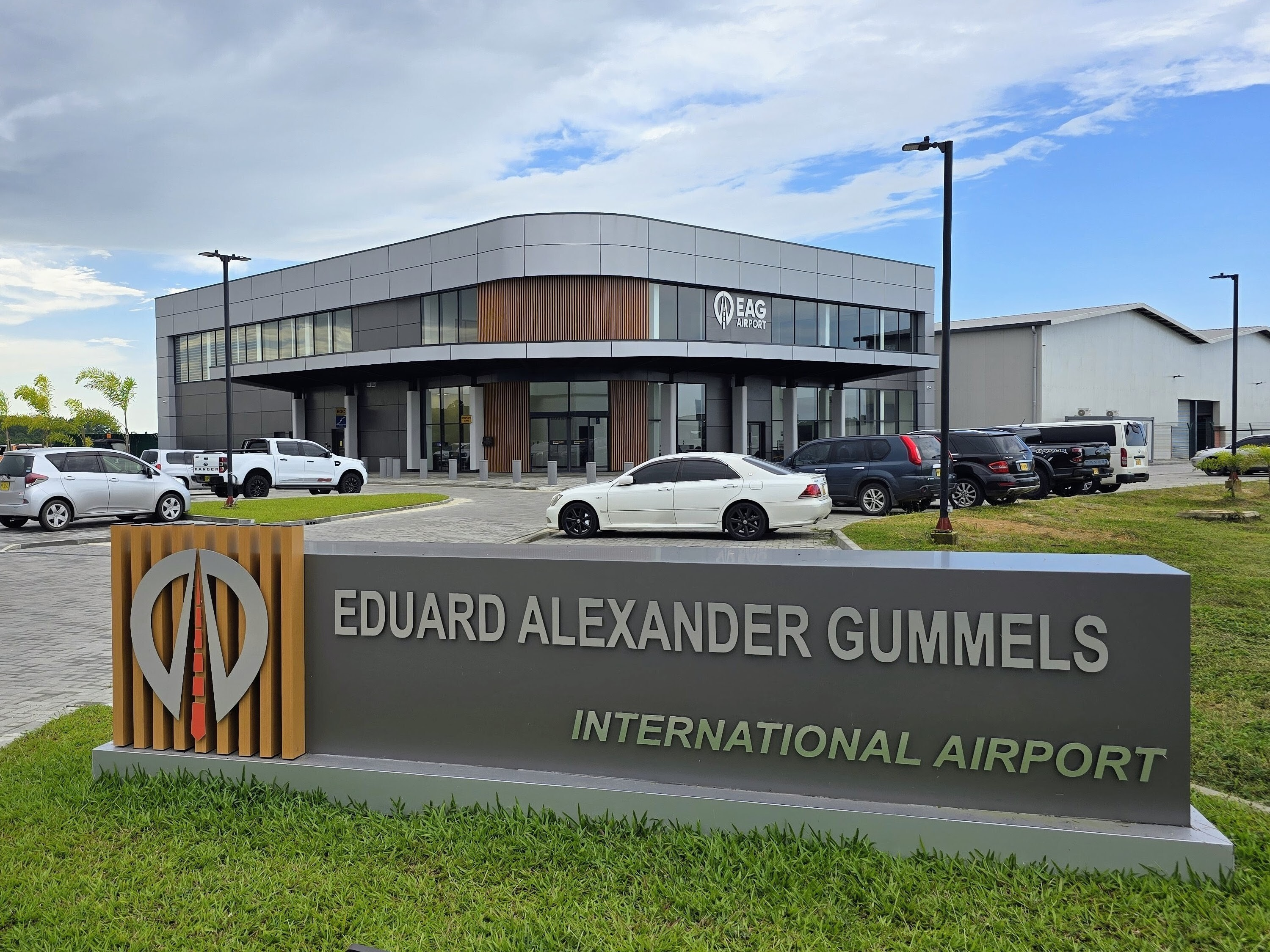
EAG Airport terminal building

== Charters ==
Major charter airlines and others serving this airport are:

- Bristow Helicopters
- Era Helicopters
- Gum Air
- Trans Guyana Airways
- Transportes Aereos Pegaso
- Armée de l'air et de l'Espace - French Air Force

== See also ==
- List of airports in Suriname
- Transport in Suriname
