= EZJ =

EZJ may refer to:

- EZJ, ICAO airline code for EZjet Air Services, a defunct airline of Guyana
- EZJ, London Stock Exchange symbol for EasyJet
- EZJ, abbreviation for EZ Jersey–Relentless Basketball, a team in the 2025 WMPBL Invitational Tournament
