= Port Kaituma Airport =

Airport in Guyana

- IATA: PKM; ICAO: SYPK

Summary
- Serves: Port Kaituma
- Elevation AMSL: 20 ft / 6 m
- Coordinates: 7°44′32.644″N 59°52′54.84″W

Map
- Location in Guyana

Runways
| Direction | Length | | Surface |
| Direction | m | ft | Surface |
|---|---|---|---|
| 06/24 | 700 | 2,297 | Paved |

Port Kaituma Airport (IATA: PKM, ICAO: SYPK) is an airport serving the village of Port Kaituma, in the Barima-Waini Region of Guyana.

Port Kaituma Airport made headlines on 18 November 1978 when US Congressman Leo Ryan and his team boarded a De Havilland Canada DHC-6 Twin Otter with registration 8R-GEJ. Ryan had been investigating the Peoples Temple cult of Jim Jones. The aircraft carrying 16 people was about to depart, when it was attacked by armed commune members. The attack resulted in five deaths including Ryan and 11 wounded. A Cessna 310G carrying six defectors from the cult was also attacked resulting in two injuries. The attack marked the beginning of the Jonestown massacre.

== Incidents and accidents ==
- On 18 November 1978, a De Havilland Canada DHC-6 Twin Otter and a Cessna 310G owned by Guyana Airways were attacked by members of the Peoples Temple resulting in five deaths and 13 injuries. The De Havilland was damaged, but was repaired and returned to service.
- On 20 August 2011, a Britten-Norman BN-2 Islander operated by Trans Guyana Airways with registration 8R-GHD, ran off the runway during take-off and crashed into a fence. There were some minor injuries, however the aircraft was damaged beyond repair.

== See also ==
- List of airports in Guyana
- Transport in Guyana
