= OGL =

OGL may refer to:

- Eugene F. Correia International Airport (IATA code: OGL), a Guyanese airport on the Atlantic coast
- Open Game License, a public copyright license by Wizards of the Coast
- Open General Licence, a license issued as part of export control in the United Kingdom
- Open Government Licence, a copyright licence for Crown copyright works published by the UK government
- OpenGL, a cross-platform API for computer graphics
