= KRM (disambiguation) =

KRM may refer to:

- Karanambo Airport, the IATA code KRM
- Keith Rupert Murdoch, the full name of Australian-American media mogul Rupert Murdoch
- Klasies River Main, consisting of 3 main caves and 2 shelters
- Kramatorsk, a city in Donetsk Oblast, Ukraine
- krm, a retired ISO 639-3 code for the Bom language, an endangered language of Sierra Leone
- KRM Commuter Link, the name of an early proposal for a 33-mile (53 km) rail service that would serve Kenosha, Racine, and Milwaukee in southeast Wisconsin
- Krueng Mane railway station, the station code KRM
