= Kurukabaru Airport =

Airport in Guyana

- IATA: none; ICAO: SYKK

Summary
- Serves: Kurukabaru
- Elevation AMSL: 3,198 ft / 975 m
- Coordinates: 4°42′50″N 59°54′40″W

Map
- Location in Guyana

Runways
Direction	Length		Surface
Direction	m	ft	Surface
05/23	1,000	3,281	Dirt
- Sources: HERE Maps SkyVector

Kurukabaru Airport (ICAO: SYKK) is an airstrip serving the Amerindian village of Kurukabaru, in the Potaro-Siparuni Region of Guyana. An international repair team arrived in 2021 and performed urgent repairs to various aids to navigation. The runway is a one kilometer long dirt airstrip.

== See also ==
- List of airports in Guyana
- Transport in Guyana
