= Bartica Airport =

Airport in Guyana

- IATA: GFO; ICAO: SYBT

Summary
- Serves: Bartica
- Elevation AMSL: 151 ft / 46 m
- Coordinates: 6°21′35″N 58°39′15″W

Map
- Location in Guyana

Runways
Direction	Length		Surface
Direction	m	ft	Surface
06/24	760	2,493	Asphalt
- Sources: Google Maps GCM SkyVector

Bartica Airport (IATA: GFO, ICAO: SYBT) is an airport serving the town of Bartica, in the Cuyuni-Mazaruni Region of Guyana. The airport's only runway is a 760-meter asphalt strip.

== See also ==
- List of airports in Guyana
- Transport in Guyana
