= Kit Nascimento =

Former Guyanese politician and journalist

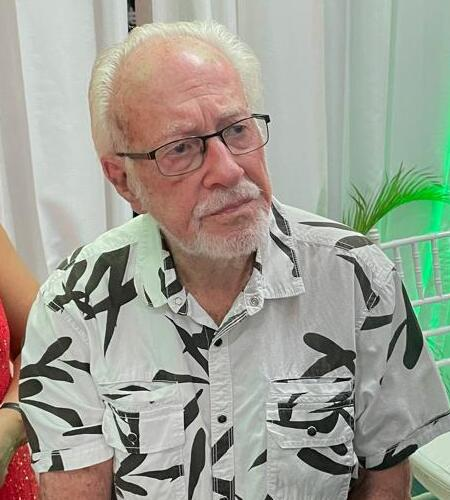
- Kit Nascimento at State House on 13 December 2024
- Born: Christopher A. Nascimento; 4 January 1932 (age 94); British Guiana
- Other name: Kit
- Education: Boston University
- Occupations: Journalist, politician, rugby administrator
- Known for: Official spokesperson for the Government of Guyana in the United States during the Jonestown massacre, and former president of GRFU, WIRU, NAWIRA, and NACRA

Christopher "Kit" A. Nascimento (born 4 January 1932) is a Guyanese journalist, rugby administrator and former politician who served in various ministerial roles under the premiership of Forbes Burnham, including Minister for Information and Minister of State for the Office of the Prime Minister. He was the spokesman for the Government of Guyana in the United States in the aftermath of the 1978 Jonestown massacre.

== Early life and education ==
Christopher A. Nascimento was born to a Portuguese Guyanese family on 4 January 1932. Nascimento was the nephew of Peter d'Aguiar, a prominent figure in Guyanese politics during the process of independence and the leader and founder of The United Force. Nascimento is an alumnus of St. Stanislaus College. He was later educated in Britain and at Boston University in the United States.

== Politics and journalism ==
=== Early career ===
Nascimento was banned from press conferences by Cheddi Jagan during his term as Premier of British Guiana. He was employed as a radio journalist at the time. Nascimento himself describes being ejected from one of Jagan's press conferences for asking "tough, difficult and awkward questions". Nascimento became a member of the United Force, before joining the PNC following Guyanese independence in 1966, when Nascimento left his graduate studies in Boston in order to return to take up the role of adviser to the Minister of Information in the new government headed by Forbes Burnham. Nascimento helped to compile a book of the Burnham's speeches, which became a book titled A Destiny to Mould, published in 1970.

Starting in 1973, Nascimento was Minister of State for the Office of the Prime Minister, a member of parliament, and a member of the PNC. He maintained this position in government during the events of the Jonestown massacre.

=== Jonestown ===
Nascimento visited Jonestown in 1977 while other government ministers were in Panama during the signing of the Torrijos–Carter Treaties. At the visit, Nascimento served Jones with papers related to the Stoen case by nailing the papers to a wooden wall, which then led to a state of emergency in Jonestown referred to as the "six day siege". Jones would go on to accuse Nascimento of being an agent for the CIA.

According to Nascimento's own account, he had contacted Forbes Burnham one month prior to the Jonestown massacre, with concerns about Jim Jones, leader of the People's Temple, after being contacted by people in San Francisco (where Jones was located before moving to Guyana). Following this contact, Guyanese government visits to the site increased along with visits from the U.S. Embassy. Nascimento was subsequently given documents by members of the People's Temple with testimonials on behalf of the People's Temple from high-ranking members of the US political system, including First Lady Rosalynn Carter, attempting to placate concerns about the Temple from the Guyanese government.

Nascimento was already in the United States at Guyana's consulate office in New York City on 18 November 1978, visiting his wife, who was very ill. At the office, he was contacted by Burnham immediately following the first reports of deaths in Jonestown. Following this, Nascimento became the spokesman for the Guyanese government in the United States, giving speeches at various universities and giving interviews to prominent American journalists such as Walter Cronkite and Tom Brokaw. Nascimento provided the viewpoint that the reputation of the United States was as much, if not more, at stake than that of Guyana's, and that the behaviour of Jim Jones and the People's Temple was a reflection of American society. He also stated that the American press covered Jonestown at a "very superficial and sensational level". Nascimento took the position that "both the victims and the murderers were Americans". Nascimento remained in the United States until at least 12 December.

Nascimento has since commented on Jonestown, completely denying any involvement of Burnham's PNC regime in the Jonestown affair. Nascimento also denied that Guyanese public officials had removed US$700,000 by plane from the Jonestown site. In 2024, Nascimento stated that the government of Guyana should not open the former Jonestown site as a tourist attraction, as such a move would not be in the interest of Guyana's international image, and would not be respectful of those who had died.

=== Later political and journalistic activities ===
In 1981, Nascimento was Minister for Mechanical Equipment in the Ministry of Works and Transport.

Following his political career in government, Nascimento became a communication consultant and public communications specialist, and has continued to publish opinion pieces in Guyanese newspapers and international newspapers such as the Trinidad Express. Nascimento has also served as a member of Guyana's private sector commission. Nascimento was a commentator on Vieira Communications Television (VCT) in the 1990s. As of 2025, Nascimento was a paid consultant for the President of Guyana, Irfaan Ali.

==== 2020 election ====
In May 2021, Nascimento and several Guyanese news outlets were sued for the sum of $2.6bn by President David A. Granger for letters published by Nascimento in various Guyanese newspapers following the 2020 Guyanese general election, where Nascimento had been an elections observer. Nascimento had been in a public row with Granger, with Granger accusing Nascimento of inflammatory and incorrect statements. Nascimento had accused Granger of attempting to rig the election.

== Other activities ==
=== Tourism ===
Nascimento opened a tourist resort, the Hurakabra River resort, on the Essequibo River near Bartica, in 2004, and was elected president of the Tourism and Hospitality Association of Guyana in 2013. Nascimento successfully encouraged the organisers of the Nereid Yacht Rally, an annual yacht rally, to permanently hold a stage in Guyana.

=== Rugby ===
Nascimento was capped as a player for the Guyana national rugby union team in the 1950s and 60s. Nascimento is a former president of the Guyana Rugby Football Union, serving in the role for 7 years in total. Nascimento was first elected president in 2001, after a number of years as vice-president. He also served as president of the West Indies Rugby Union, as well as the NAWIRA and its successor body, NACRA, being the first native West Indian to serve as president on any of those boards. He was then the first native West Indian to serve as a board member of the International Rugby Board. Following his retirement as president of GRFU on 14 May 2012, Nascimento was appointed as patron of the GRFU in 2014, and was reappointed patron in 2023.

== Personal life ==
Nascimento married Gem Madhoo, a former member of staff at Guyana National Cooperative Bank. He was previously married to Elayne Coyne, from Watertown, Massachusetts.

== Cultural depictions ==
Virgil Nascimento is a protagonist in Paradise Undone: A Novel of Jonestown by Annie Dawid, published in 2023. The character is based on Nascimento and Laurence Everil Mann, the Ambassador of Guyana to the United States from 1975 to 1981.
