= Ebini Airport =

Airport in Guyana

- IATA: none; ICAO: SYEB; WMO: 81010

Summary
- Serves: Ebini
- Elevation AMSL: 147 ft / 45 m
- Coordinates: 5°34′05″N 57°46′35″W

Map
- Location in Guyana

Runways
| Direction | Length | | Surface |
| Direction | m | ft | Surface |
|---|---|---|---|
| 10/28 | 1,000 | 3,281 | Gravel |
- Sources: HERE Maps SkyVector

Ebini Airport (ICAO: SYEB) is an airport serving the community of Ebini in the Upper Demerara-Berbice Region of Guyana. The 1-kilometer-long runway has a gravel surface.

== See also ==
- List of airports in Guyana
- Transport in Guyana
