= Karasabai Airport =

Airport in Guyana

- IATA: KRG; ICAO: SYKS

Summary
- Serves: Karasabai
- Elevation AMSL: 351 ft / 107 m
- Coordinates: 4°01′45″N 59°33′00″W

Map
- Location in Guyana

Runways
Direction	Length		Surface
Direction	m	ft	Surface
10/28	1,067	3,501	Gravel
- Sources: Google Maps SkyVector GCM

Karasabai Airport (IATA: KRG, ICAO: SYKS) is an airport serving the Macushi community of Karasabai in the Upper Takutu-Upper Essequibo Region of Guyana. A 1,067 meters long gravel strip is the airport's only runway.

== See also ==
- List of airports in Guyana
- Transport in Guyana
