= Lethem Airport =

Airport in Guyana

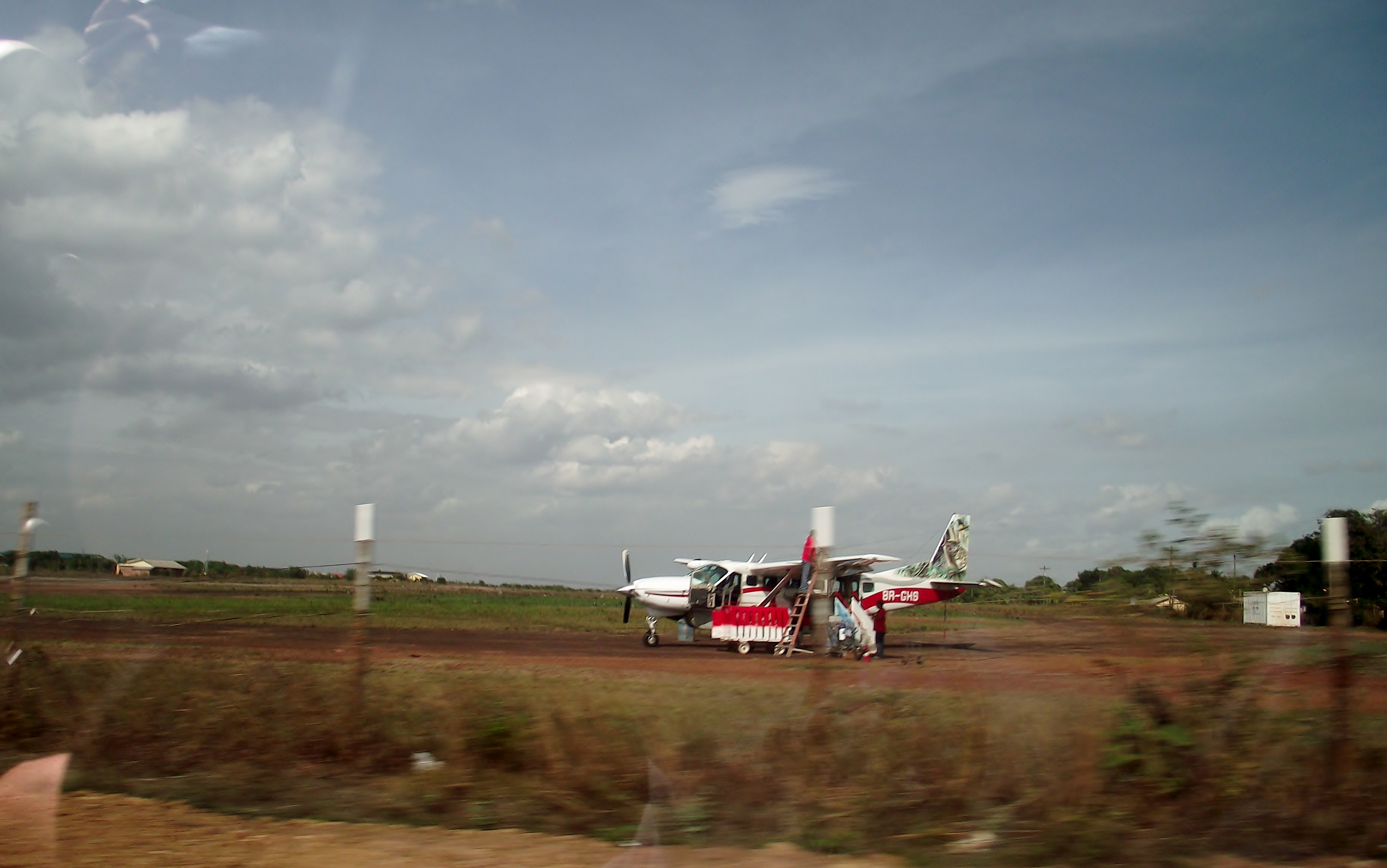
- IATA: LTM; ICAO: SYLT; WMO: 81006

Summary
- Airport type: Public
- Operator: Government
- Serves: Lethem
- Elevation AMSL: 351 ft (107 m)
- Coordinates: 3°22′20″N 59°47′25″W

Map
- Location of the airport in Guyana

Runways
Direction	Length		Surface
Direction	m	ft	Surface
07/25	1,825	5,988	Asphalt
- Source: DAFIF, GCM STV Google Maps

Lethem Airport (IATA: LTM, ICAO: SYLT) is an airport serving Lethem, a town in the Upper Takutu-Upper Essequibo region of Guyana. The airport has an 1,825-meter long, asphalt-surface runway.

== Airlines and destinations ==
Airlines	Destinations
Trans Guyana Airways	Georgetown–Ogle

== See also ==
- List of airports in Guyana
- Transport in Guyana
