= Apoteri Airport =

Airport in Guyana

- IATA: none; ICAO: SYAP

Summary
- Serves: Apoteri
- Elevation AMSL: 301 ft / 92 m
- Coordinates: 4°00′55″N 58°36′14″W

Map
- Location in Guyana

Runways
Direction	Length		Surface
Direction	m	ft	Surface
06/24	1,158	3,799	Grass
- Sources: HERE Maps GCM

Apoteri Airport (ICAO: SYAP) is an airport serving the village of Apoteri, in the Upper Takutu-Upper Essequibo Region of Guyana. The runway is a 1,158-meter grass strip.

== See also ==
- List of airports in Guyana
- Transport in Guyana
