= New Amsterdam Airport =

Airport in Guyana

New Amsterdam Airport Rose Hall
- IATA: none; ICAO: SYNA

Summary
- Serves: New Amsterdam
- Elevation AMSL: 3 ft / 1 m
- Coordinates: 6°14′40″N 57°28′25″W

Map
- Location in Guyana

Runways
Direction	Length		Surface
Direction	m	ft	Surface
08/26	790	2,592	Concrete
- Source: Google Maps

New Amsterdam Airport (ICAO: SYNA) is an airport serving the city of New Amsterdam in the East Berbice-Corentyne Region of Guyana.

== See also ==
- List of airports in Guyana
- Transport in Guyana
