= Rugby union in French Guiana =

Growing popularity of the sport

- Country: French Guiana
- Governing body: French Rugby Federation; Comité Territorial de Rugby de Guyane
- National team: French Guiana

Rugby union in French Guiana is a minor but growing sport.

== Governing body ==
The Comité Territorial de Rugby de Guyane is a committee under the umbrella of the French Rugby Federation which is the governing body for rugby union within French Guiana.

== History ==
Rugby was first introduced to French Guiana by the French. More talented players tend to leave for Metropolitan France.

There have been occasional games against sides from the Caribbean islands, and nearby countries such as Trinidad and Tobago and Guyana. Most of its rugby contacts are either with them, or with France itself.

== Honour board ==
National champions

- 2015 Stade Cayennais
- 2014 Stade Cayennais
- 2013 Stade Cayennais
- 2012 Stade Cayennais
- 2011 Stade Cayennais
- 2010 Stade Cayennais
- 2009 Stade Cayennais
- 2008 Stade Cayennais
- 2007 Stade Cayennais
- 2006 Rugby Club de Kourou
- 2005 Rugby Club de Kourou
- 2004 Rugby Club de Kourou
- 2003 Stade Cayennais
- 2002 Stade Cayennais
- 2001 Stade Cayennais
- 2000 Stade Cayennais
- 1999 Stade Cayennais
- 1998 Stade Cayennais
- 1997 CSA 3ème RSMA - Rugby Club du Tigre
- 1996 Stade Cayennais
- 1995 Stade Cayennais
- 1994 Rugby Club de Kourou
- 1993 Rugby Club de Kourou
- 1992 Stade Cayennais
- 1991 Stade Cayennais
- 1990 COSMA Rugby
- 1989 Stade Cayennais
- 1988 Stade Cayennais
- 1987 Stade Cayennais
- 1986 Rugby Club de Kourou
- 1985 Rugby Club de Kourou
- 1984 Rugby Club de Kourou
- 1983 Stade Cayennais
- 1982 Rugby Club de Kourou
- 1981 Rugby Club de Kourou
- 1980 Rugby Club de Kourou
- 1979 Rugby Club de Kourou
- 1978 Rugby Club de Kourou
- 1977 Stade Cayennais
- 1976 Stade Cayennais
- 1975 Stade Cayennais
- 1974 Stade Cayennais

Cup Winners

- 2015
- 2014
- 2013 Stade Cayennais
- 2012 Stade Cayennais
- 2011 COSMA Rugby
- 2010 Stade Cayennais
- 2009 Stade Cayennais
- 2008 Stade Cayennais
- 2007 Stade Cayennais
- 2006 Stade Cayennais
- 2005 Stade Cayennais
- 2004 Stade Cayennais
- 2003 Rugby Club de Kourou
- 2002 Stade Cayennais
- 2001 Stade Cayennais
- 2000 Stade Cayennais
- 1999 Stade Cayennais
- 1998 Stade Cayennais
- 1997 Stade Cayennais
- 1996 Stade Cayennais
- 1995 COSMA Rugby
- 1994 Rugby Club de Kourou
- 1993 Stade Cayennais
- 1992 Stade Cayennais
- 1991 Stade Cayennais
- 1990 Stade Cayennais
- 1989 Stade Cayennais
- 1988 Stade Cayennais
- 1987 Stade Cayennais
- 1986 Rugby Club de Kourou
- 1985 Stade Cayennais
- 1984 Rugby Club de Kourou

== See also ==
- Rugby union in France
