= Annai Airport =

Airport in Guyana

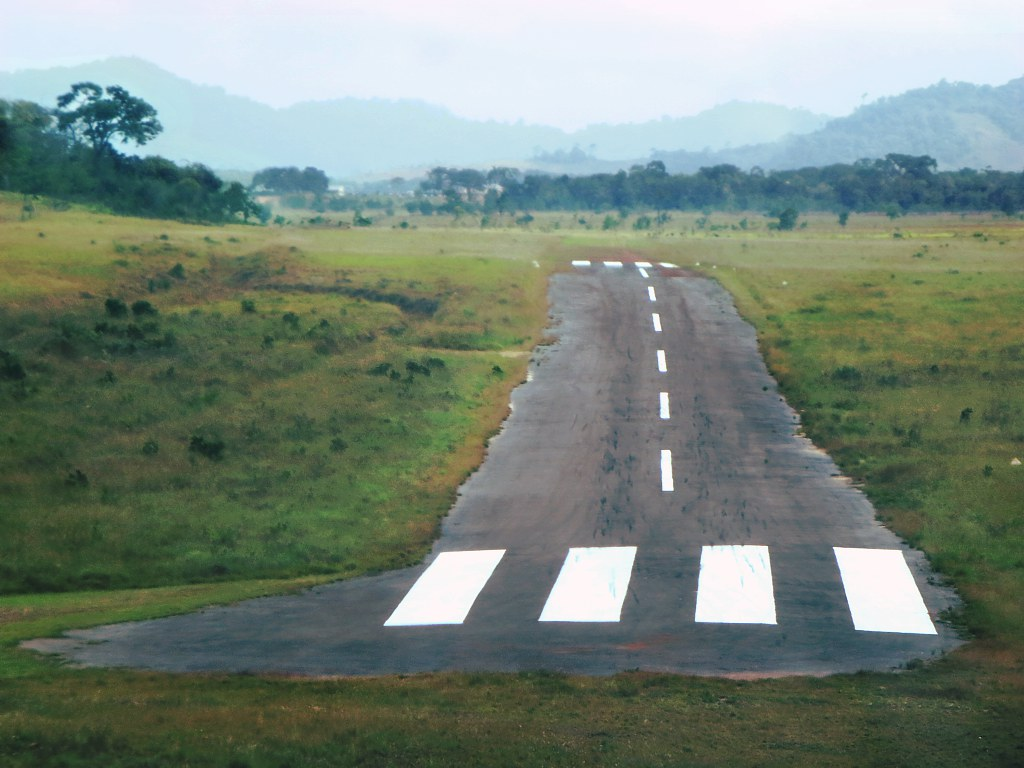
- Annai Airstrip (2014)
- IATA: NAI; ICAO: SYAN

Summary
- Serves: Annai
- Elevation AMSL: 301 ft / 92 m
- Coordinates: 3°57′45″N 59°07′15″W

Map
- Location in Guyana

Runways
Direction	Length		Surface
Direction	m	ft	Surface
07/25	1,000	3,281	Asphalt, grass
- Sources: Bing Maps GCM

Annai Airport (IATA: NAI, ICAO: SYAN) is an airport serving the village of Annai, in the Upper Takutu-Upper Essequibo Region of Guyana. The 1,000-meter runway has 640 metres (2,100 ft) of asphalt paving, with the remainder grass.

It is a small, hinterland airport that serves Guyana's tourism sector.

Since 2019, Annai utilizes the Automatic Dependent Surveillance Broadcast System (ADSB) for tracking planes.

== See also ==
- List of airports in Guyana
- Transport in Guyana
