= French Guiana Rugby Committee =

Comité Territorial de Rugby de Guyane
- Sport: Rugby union
- Website: rugby-guyane.com

The French Guiana Rugby Committee (French: Comité de Rugby de Guyane, —or officially: Comité Territorial de Rugby de Guyane) is a committee under the umbrella of the French Rugby Federation which is the governing body for rugby union within French Guiana.

It is not affiliated with the International Rugby Board (IRB) in its own right. As an overseas department of France, French Guiana can participate in international competition, but not for the Rugby World Cup.

== See also ==
- Rugby union in French Guiana
