= Mahdia Airport =

Airport in Guyana

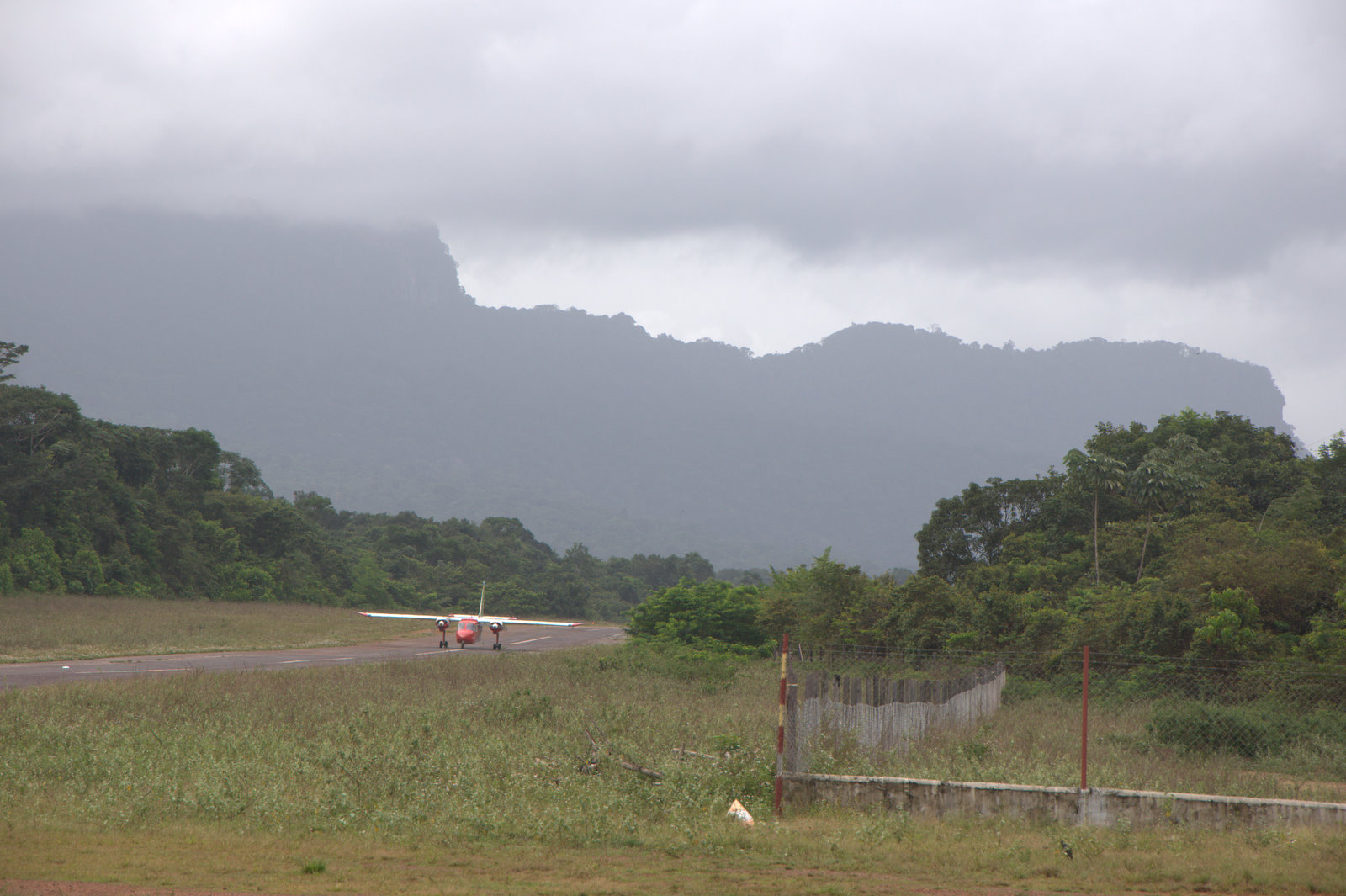
- IATA: MHA; ICAO: SYMD

Summary
- Serves: Mahdia
- Elevation AMSL: 300 ft / 91 m
- Coordinates: 5°16′10″N 59°08′50″W

Map
- Location in Guyana

Runways
Direction	Length		Surface
Direction	m	ft	Surface
17/35	1,067	3,501	Grass
- Sources: Google Maps GCM SkyVector

Mahdia Airport (IATA: MHA, ICAO: SYMD) is an airport serving the village of Mahdia, in the Potaro-Siparuni Region of Guyana. The airport's only runway is a 1,067-meter grass strip.

== See also ==
- List of airports in Guyana
- Transport in Guyana
