= Shrinivási =

Surinamese poet (1926–2019)

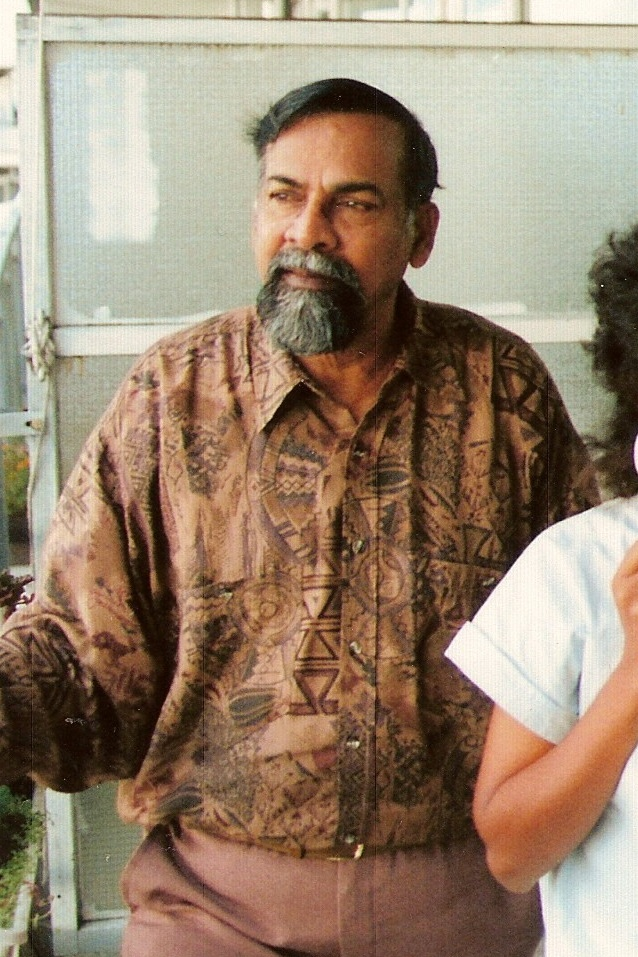
- Shrinivási (1989)
- Born: Martinus Haridat Lutchman; 12 December 1926; Vaderszorg, Kwatta, Suriname
- Died: 26 January 2019 (aged 92); Willemstad, Curaçao
- Occupations: Poet, teacher

Shrinivási (12 December 1926 – 26 January 2019) was a Surinamese poet, whose civil name is Martinus Haridat Lutchman. He was born in Kwatta, Suriname and a teacher by profession. In 1949 he moved to Curaçao where his earliest poetry was published as Fernando in the magazine Caraïbisch Venster. Lutchman decided to change his pseudonym to Shrinivási which means noble resident of Suriname, and published in Tongoni (1958-1959), Soela (1962-1964) en Moetete (1968). His first publication of a collection of poetry was Anjali in 1963. His best known collections are Pratikshā (1968), Om de zon (1972), and Sangam (1992).

The majority of poems were written in Dutch with the occasional poem in Hindi, but Pratikshá (1968) contains the first poetry ever publiced in Sarnami. His poetry is mainly about the fortunes and misfortunes of his native Suriname. Shrinivási tried to reconcile the prevailing opposites in his native country. In 1963, Shrinivási returned to Suriname. Later he became a nomad alternating between Suriname, Curaçao, and the Netherlands. The only known prose written by Shrinivási is Sint Annabaai.

In 1974 he was awarded the Gouvernor Currie Prize. He received the Suriname State Prize for Literature (1989-1991) for Sangam.
