= Port Kaituma Community School =

Educational institution in Port Kaituma, Guyana

Coordinates: 7°44′N 59°53′W

Port Kaituma Community School (PKCS) is a learning centre in Port Kaituma within the Barima-Waini administrative region of Guyana.

Incorporating the Nursery, Primary and Secondary departments, the Community School provides an important educational resource to its students, providing the opportunity to break free from employment in gold mining and its support services.

== History ==
Built in the times of Forbes Burnham, the then President of Guyana, PKCS was part of a major vision to populate Guyana's hinterland regions to make the country more self-sufficient. Nearby Matthew's Ridge was touted as a prospective new capital city due to its rich manganese resources.

During its heyday, the school boasted over 800 students from all over Guyana. Most of these students were housed in the nearby dormitories. The school had its own farm, ball field and agricultural patch.

The decline of the region following the deceased manganese operations and the abandonment of the hinterland population project meant Port Kaituma was no longer a priority; the area experienced an economic downturn. The school numbers fell and the dorms were abandoned towards the end of the 1980s. Most of the beds were transferred to Kaituma's more affluent neighbour Mabaruma and its North West Secondary School. The farm has since been invaded by the encroaching rainforest.

Such was the deterioration of the school (in 2002 a secondary pupil fell through the floorboards) that the matter was taken up with the World Bank. Only the secondary department was accepted for the project and following extensive refurbishment the school was re-opened amidst governmental celebration in time for the 2003/04 academic year.

Port Kaituma Teachers Quarters

There is a lack of teachers. Many of the underqualified primary teachers are required to step in and in 2002 Project Trust started sending two volunteer teachers per year to PKCS to bolster the teaching team. Since 2005 worldteach volunteers from America have been teaching at the primary and secondary schools. Peacecorps started this year to send volunteers but they are not officially attached to the school. In November 2007, Sir Adams was replaced as HM by Miss Brittlebank.
