= Karanambo Airport =

Airport in Guyana

- IATA: KRM; ICAO: SYKR

Summary
- Serves: Karanambo
- Elevation AMSL: 302 ft / 92 m
- Coordinates: 3°46′15″N 59°20′35″W

Map
- Location in Guyana

Runways
Direction	Length		Surface
Direction	m	ft	Surface
07/25	1,372	4,501	Dirt
- Sources: Google Maps GCM

Karanambo Airport (IATA: KRM, ICAO: SYKR) is an airport serving the village of Karanambo, in the Upper Takutu-Upper Essequibo Region of Guyana. The 1,372-meter long runway is a dirt surface.

== See also ==
- List of airports in Guyana
- Transport in Guyana
