= Linden Airport (Guyana) =

Airport in Guyana

- IATA: none; ICAO: SYLD

Summary
- Airport type: Public
- Operator: Government
- Serves: Linden, Guyana
- Elevation AMSL: 180 ft (55 m)
- Coordinates: 5°57′57″N 58°16′13″W

Map
- Location in Guyana

Runways
Direction	Length		Surface
Direction	ft	m	Surface
11/29	5,000	1,524	Asphalt
- Source: DAFIF Bing Maps

Linden Airport (ICAO: SYLD) is an airport serving Linden, the capital of the Upper Demerara-Berbice region of Guyana.

== Facilities ==
The airport elevation is 180 feet (55 m) above mean sea level. Its 1,524-meter runway, designated 11/29, has an asphalt surface.

== See also ==
- List of airports in Guyana
- Transport in Guyana
