= Gum Air =

Surinamese airline

IATA	ICAO	Call sign
—	GUM	GUMAIR
- Founded: September 16, 1971; 55 years ago
- Operating bases: Zorg en Hoop Airport
- Hubs: Eduard Alexander Gummels (EAG) Airport
- Secondary hubs: Gummels Heliport
- Fleet size: 11
- Headquarters: Paramaribo, Suriname
- Key people: Dean Gummels (MD)
- Website: www.gumair.sr

Gum Air is a Surinamese airline based in Paramaribo, Suriname. Gum Air cooperates with Trans Guyana Airways to provide daily flights between Eduard Alexander Gummels International Airport in Paramaribo, Suriname and Ogle Airport in Georgetown, Guyana.

It is on the List of airlines currently banned in the European Union.

== History ==
Gum Air was founded in 1971 by six brothers of the Gummels family. The company they started in March 1964, was agriculture air spray company named Surinam Sky Farmers and Gum Air its offspring focused more on domestic flights and regional charters. Whereas Surinam Sky Farmers has its base in the rice district of Nickerie at the Wageningen Airstrip together with Overeem Air Service maintaining Grumman Ag Cat aircraft, Gum Air has set up its domestic airline at the Zorg en Hoop Airport in the city of Paramaribo and its international operation at the new Eduard Alexander Gummels Airport since March 2025.

== Current operation ==
Gum Air has its domestic base at Zorg en Hoop Airport in the capital city Paramaribo and now mainly flies with single engine Cessna airplanes and twin-engined de Havilland Canada DHC-6 Twin Otter aircraft.

Gum Air also owns the new Eduard Alexander Gummels Airport (SMEG / EAX) formerly a dedicated Heliport, Gummels Heliport Paramaribo, built in Suriname at the Gummelsweg in the neighborhood of Kwatta near the city of Paramaribo, Suriname. Privately owned by the Gummels family the heliport is still mainly used for helicopter charters and primarily for offshore development activities within the country. Operators like Bristow Helicopters, Omni Helicopters from Brazil and Transportes Aereos Pegaso SA from Mexico have used this base.

Besides charter flights within Suriname from Zorg en Hoop Airport, Gum Air also operates scheduled interior services from Paramaribo to places like Benzdorp, Cottica, Gabaka, Drietabbetje and Stoelmanseiland.

Internationally Gum Air has an agreement with Trans Guyana Airways and together they provide regular scheduled flights between Eduard Alexander Gummels Airport, Paramaribo (Suriname) and Ogle Airport of Georgetown (Guyana).

Gum Air has flown various unique types of STOL Short Take Off & Landing aircraft from Suriname in the past such as Dornier DO 28D-1 Skyservant, GAF Nomad, Britten-Norman BN-2 Islander and also helicopter types such as Agusta-Bell 204B & Bell 206B Jet Ranger II.

== Future expansion plans ==
In September 2021, Gum Air placed an order at Cessna for a new Cessna 408 SkyCourier to become the first operator in the Caribbean and Latin America for this new type of twin engine turboprop aircraft planned for delivery after 2023. Gum Air constructed a new 3600-foot runway at its Gummels Heliport Paramaribo, and plans to utilize the SkyCourier for flights between Paramaribo, Georgetown, Port of Spain, and Cayenne. The new EAG Airport will mainly support the Oil & Gas, and Cargo sectors with charter flights and is scheduled for its official opening by the end of March 2025.

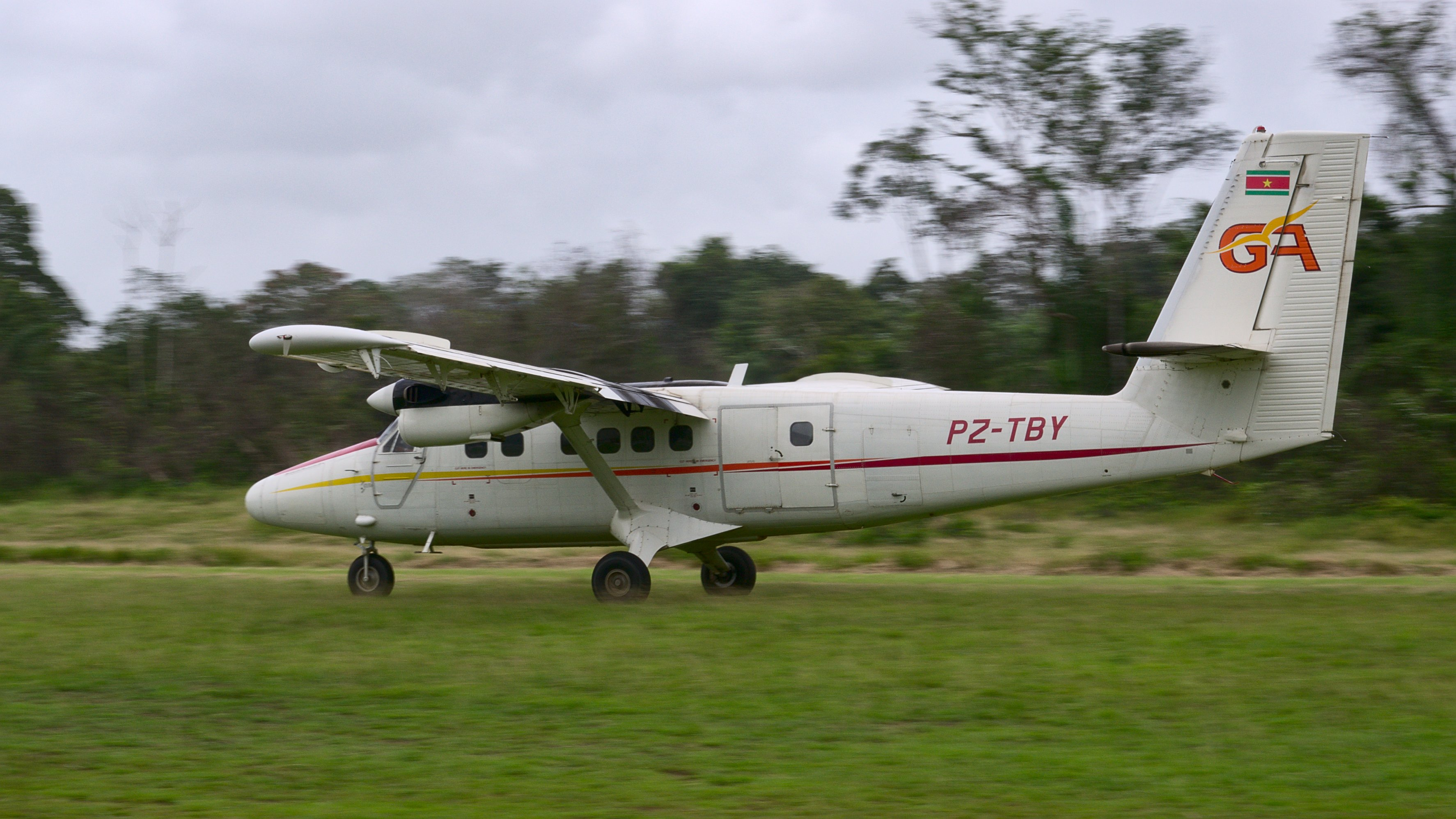
Gum Air De Havilland Twin Otter

== Fleet ==
Gum Air today owns a fleet of ten aircraft plus one helicopter, consisting of five types of aircraft varying from five to 19 seats. One Cessna SkyCourier is on order for delivery after 2023.

Aircraft	In Fleet	On order	Passengers	Notes
Beechcraft 1900D	1	1	2 pilots plus 19 passengers	(as of July 2026)
Cessna U206B/G Stationair 6/Super Skywagon	2		1 pilot plus 5 passengers
Cessna 208B Grand Caravan	4		1-2 pilots plus 8-9 passengers	(Max 14 passengers with FAR Part 23 waiver)
De Havilland Canada DHC-6-300 Twin Otter	2		2 pilots plus 19 passengers	(as of August 2025)
Total	9	1

== Accidents and incidents ==
- On 10 February 2001 Gum Air's GAF Nomad N24A, registered PZ-TBP was written off when it crashed on a flight from Paramaribo – Zanderij Johan Adolf Pengel International Airport (PBM/SMJP) to Njoeng Jacob Kondre Airstrip (ICAO: SMJK). The Nomad plane had lost radio contact. According to personnel at the airstrip in Jacob Kondre it was flying low and crashed into a mountain. All 9 passengers plus the pilot died.
- On 21 August 2008 a Gum Air's Cessna 207 Skywagon, PZ-TRR, ran off the airstrip at Poesoegroenoe Airstrip (ICAO: SMPG) during take-off when engine failure occurred. All 6 people on board survived, with only two slightly injured.
- On 22 November 2008 Gum Air's Cessna 404 Titan, registered PZ-TVC made a forced landing on the road near Gusterie, Suriname, after engine failures. The aircraft came to rest in the bushes and was reported destroyed. No injuries or fatalities occurred in this accident.
- On 15 May 2017 Gum Air's Cessna 206 Stationair 6 registered PZ-TVU had a landing gear failure during loading at airstrip Kwamalasamutu (ICAO: SMSM). Airplane gear was later repaired and flown back to homebase Zorg en Hoop Airport
- On 28 July 2021 Gum Air's Cessna 206 Stationair 6 registered PZ-TBG crash landed near the former mining area of Paranam in Suriname. This accident occurred following a loss of engine power, four passengers and female pilot survived with minor injuries.
