= Baramita Airport =

Airport in Guyana

- IATA: BMJ; ICAO: SYBR

Summary
- Serves: Baramita
- Elevation AMSL: 499 ft / 152 m
- Coordinates: 7°22′20″N 60°29′15″W

Map
- Location in Guyana

Runways
Direction	Length		Surface
Direction	m	ft	Surface
07/25	914	2,999	Grass
- Sources: HERE Maps GCM SkyVector

Baramita Airport (IATA: BMJ, ICAO: SYBR) is an airport serving the Amerindian village of Baramita, in the Barima-Waini Region of Guyana. The solitary, 914-meter runway of the airport is a grass surface.

== See also ==
- List of airports in Guyana
- Transport in Guyana
