= Portuguese Guyanese =

Guyanese of Portuguese birth or descent

Portuguese Guyanese people
Guianense português, Luso-guianense

Regions with significant populations
- Georgetown, New Amsterdam

Languages
- English (Guyanese) · Portuguese

Religion
- Christianity (Roman Catholicism · Presbyterianism)

Related ethnic groups
- Portuguese Trinidadian and Tobagonian · Portuguese Surinamese · Portuguese diaspora

A Portuguese Guyanese is a Guyanese whose ancestors came from Portugal or a Portuguese who has Guyanese citizenship. Around 1,910 people identified as Portuguese Guyanese according to the 2012 census

== Demographics ==
People of Portuguese descent were mainly introduced to Guyana as indentured labourers to make up for the exodus of former slaves who left the sugar plantations upon emancipation. The first groups arrived in 1835 until 1882, most having arrived by the 1860s. Most Portuguese trace their ancestry to the North Atlantic island of Madeira, which already had a long history of sugar production, but was beset with economic depression and political issues.

Those who stayed on after their indenture made up a Guyanese middle class, and were an important part of the commercial sector. The rum industry was predominantly owned by Portuguese Guyanese.

Portuguese of Guyana support Roman Catholic churches, schools, and maintain their language through periodicals such as A Voz do Português, A Liberdade, O Lusitano, Chronica Semanal and The Watchman.

In 1906, the first Portuguese Guyanese ran for public office. There is a 'Portuguese Arrival Day' on May 3 to mark the first arrival to Guyana.

Some have advanced the idea that the Portuguese presence in the Guianas predates 1834. Portuguese Sephardic Jews had settled in neighbouring Dutch Guiana in the 17th century before the Dutch arrived. Portuguese Jewish communities also exist in Aruba, Barbados, and Curaçao, some of whom had come from Dutch Brazil. Some of the Portuguese in Guyana may have their origins in these Dutch-speaking Portuguese groups. They were known as the "Curaçao Portuguese" within the larger Portuguese community.

The number of Portuguese Guyanese (4.3% of the population in 1891) has been declining constantly over the decades. Many Portuguese Guyanese have since emigrated onward and now live in London, Toronto, other parts of the Caribbean and the United States.

The general success of this group also led to animosity such as the 1856 ‘Angel Gabriel’ Riots in which Portuguese shops were looted and damaged. Even though being of European ancestry, they are viewed as a distinct from British Europeans for their language, religion, and former-indentured status.

== Notable Portuguese Guyanese ==
- Ivor Mendonca – Cricketer for the West Indies
- Peter D'Aguiar – Businessman and conservative politician
- Mary Noel Menezes – Roman Catholic nun and historian
- Olga Lopes-Seale – Guyanese-Barbadian radio personality
- Mark Teixeira – former professional baseball player
- Greg Ranjitsingh – professional football player; has Guyanese-Portuguese ancestry through his mother
- Dwayne De Rosario - former professional soccer player
- Priscilla Lopes-Schliep - former hurdler
- Kit Nascimento - Politician, rugby administrator and journalist; nephew of Peter D'Aguiar
- Gerry Gouveia - Founder and CEO of Roraima Airways

== See also ==
- Catholic Church in Guyana
