= Kaituma River =

Location
- Country: Guyana

Physical characteristics
- Mouth: Barima River
  - coordinates: 8°11′N 59°41′W

Basin features
- Inland ports: Port Kaituma

The Kaituma River is a river of Guyana in the Barima-Waini region. The mouth is at the upper Barima River, and the area is made up of mostly mangrove swamps.

The Kaituma and Barima Rivers were dredged to make enough room for ships to collect ore from the mines in the vicinity of Port Kaituma. It was a hiding place for escapees of the People's Temple massacre due to its proximity to the Jonestown settlement.

== Environmental concerns ==
Testing done by Guyana Water Inc. and the EPA found high rates of mercury in the river that has been linked to mining in the area. Residents of Port Kaituma and other villages have to obtain water from other sources, such as wells or delivered from outside the area because piped water is pumped from the river.

An indigenous practice of stunning fish by using 'canami' also impacts water quality.

== See also ==
- List of rivers of Guyana

== Bibliography ==
- Rand McNally, The New International Atlas, 1993.
