= Universal Airlines (Guyana) =

Airline of Guyana (2001–2005)

IATA	ICAO	Call sign
UW	UVG	GUYANA JET
- Founded: 2001
- Commenced operations: December 13, 2001
- Ceased operations: August 29, 2005
- Hubs: Cheddi Jagan International Airport
- Frequent-flyer program: UNI-MILES
- Fleet size: 1
- Destinations: 6
- Headquarters: Richmond Hill, Queens, New York, United States
- Key people: Sudarshan Singh (President)
- Founders: Chandramatie Harpaul; Ramashree Singh
- Website: universal-airlines.com

For the U.S.-based cargo airline which operated from 1966 to 1972, see Universal Airlines (United States).

Universal Airlines Co. was an airline based in Georgetown, Guyana and headquartered in Richmond Hill, New York. The airline operated a scheduled passenger service to the United States and to nearby Trinidad and Tobago until going bankrupt. Operations were suspended in 2005.

== History ==
The airline was established by Guyanese sisters Chandramatie Harpaul and Ramashree Singh to replace the defunct Guyana Airways in 2001. Operations started on December 13, 2001, with a Boeing 767-300ER leased from LOT Polish Airlines non-stop from New York City to Georgetown. The company was financed by 11 investors from Guyana. Catering mainly to Guyanese in the US, the airline focused on the specific needs of this customer base, offering larger baggage allowances and a non-stop route.

It subsequently leased an Airbus A320-200 from TACA Airlines, but was later repossessed in 2005, and Universal Airlines was forced to suspend operations on August 29, 2005. BWIA West Indies Airways assisted stranded passengers during that time.

== Destinations ==
Universal Airlines flew to the following destinations:

Brazil

- Manaus (Eduardo Gomes International Airport)

Guyana

- Georgetown (Cheddi Jagan International Airport) Hub

United States

- Fort Lauderdale (Fort Lauderdale–Hollywood International Airport)
- New York City (John F. Kennedy International Airport)

Suriname

- Paramaribo (Johan Adolf Pengel International Airport)

Trinidad and Tobago

- Piarco (Piarco International Airport)

== Fleet ==
Universal Airlines operated the following aircraft:

Aircraft	Total	Introduced	Retired	Notes
Airbus A320-200	1	2005	2005	Leased from TACA Airlines
Boeing 767-300ER	2	2001	2003	Leased from LOT Polish Airlines
Boeing 767-300ER	1	2003	2004	Leased from Air Atlanta Icelandic

== See also ==
- List of airlines of Guyana
