= Annai, Guyana =

Annai
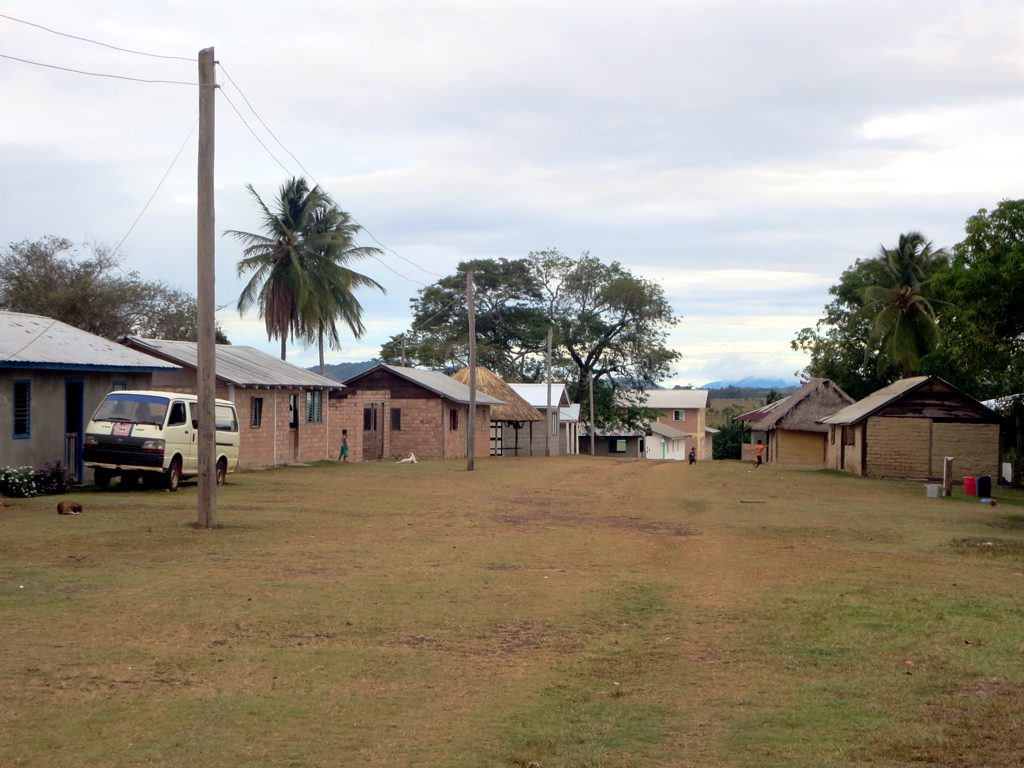
- Annai (2014)

- Location in Guyana
- Coordinates: 3°57′N 59°08′W
- Country: Guyana
- Region: Upper Takutu-Upper Essequibo

Government
  - Toshao: Michael George

Population (2012)
  - Total: 481

Annai is an Amerindian village in the Upper Takutu-Upper Essequibo Region of Guyana. Located in on the edge of the Rupununi savannah and the foothills of the Pakaraima Mountains, the village has an altitude of 95 metres (314 feet). It is approximately 15 miles (24 km) north of Karanambo and is 416 km (258 mi) by road from the nation's capital, Georgetown.

The population of the area are mainly Macushi people. Annai is one of the northernmost Macushi Amerindian villages in the North Rupununi Savannahs. It is mainly an agriculture community living on cassava and peanut farming, and cattle ranching. Electricity is provided by solar power. Public services include a nursery, primary, and secondary school as well as a public health centre. Annai's airstrip (NAI) allows light planes to land.

The Rock View Ecotourism Resort, built in the 1950s, is located in the village.

Kwatamang is a satellite village of Annai that was settled in 1948, and a school was built there in 1990.
