= Karasabai =

- Village
- Location in Guyana
- Coordinates: 4.0329°N 59.5449°W
- Country: Guyana
- Region: Upper Takutu-Upper Essequibo

Government
  - Toshao: Marlon Edwards

Population (2009)
  - Total: 1,600

Karasabai is an Indigenous village of Macushi Amerindians in the Upper Takutu-Upper Essequibo Region of Guyana. It is located in the South Pakaraima Mountains, and near the Ireng River which flows south to the Amazon River.

== Legend ==
According to the legends of the Macushi people, Makonaima descended to Earth and the Indigenous peoples are his offspring. On his travels, Makonaima passed a creek where a treasure was located. He decided to turn the treasure to stone. The village of Karasabai is located at the bay of that creek.

== Overview ==
Karasabai has a school, and a health care clinic. The nearest big town is Normandia in Brazil. The primary language of its inhabitants is Macushi with English as the secondary language. The major religion is Christianity.

In December 2020, an ambulance, which was customised for rough terrain, was delivered to the community. In March 2021, 112 tractors were delivered to Amerindian villages, Karasabai included to, 'to boost agriculture to ensure that food security across the hinterland is sustained and secured so our people will not go hungry in times of disaster, and that agriculture will be taken to a different level.' according to the Minister of Amerindian Affairs, Pauline Sukhi.

As of 2019, the village is negotiating indigenous land rights with the government of Guyana.

Karasabai is connected to Lethem by road. In 2016, a road was constructed to Monkey Mountain. The Karasabai Airport is located near the village. There are no radio or television signals. Telephone services and internet access are very limited.

The G$ 5M Karasabai's Community Development Project was launched on 20 January 2018 as part of the Amerindian Development Fund in order to set up a tourism industry.

== Economy ==
The economy of the village is based on subsistence farming, and cattle rearing.

Launched in January 2018, the Kezeé Eco Lodge is a tourist resort located in the village. Karasabai is one of the few places where the sun parakeet (ratinga solstitialis) can be observed in the wild.
