= Apoteri =

Village in Upper Takutu-Upper Essequibo, Guyana

- Village
- Location in Guyana
- Coordinates: 04°02′N 58°35′W
- Country: Guyana
- Region: Upper Takutu-Upper Essequibo

Government
  - Toshao: Clement Joseph

Area
  - Total: 71.88 sq mi (186.2 km^{2})

Population (2012)
  - Total: 271

Apoteri is a village in the Upper Takutu-Upper Essequibo Region of Guyana, near the confluence of the Rupununi River with the Essequibo, at an altitude of 53 metres (177 feet). Apoteri started to develop as the centre of the balatá industry. The population is mainly Amerindian of the Macushi and Wapishana people.

The village was founded in 1970 by Booker Brothers as a base for balatá production. Workers settled from villages in South Rupununi. In 1973 a school was established in the village.

Wildlife is plentiful in the area, and the village promotes itself for eco-tourism. The Apoteri Fishing Camp is located at the mouth of the Rupununi River. The Iwokrama International Centre which aims to conserve the rainforest and provide sustainable development is nearby.

The town is served by Apoteri Airport.
