= Sand Creek, Guyana =

Sand Creek Suburun Tao
- Village
- Location in Guyana
- Coordinates: 2.9952°N 59.5198°W
- Country: Guyana
- Region: Upper Takutu-Upper Essequibo

Government
  - Toshao: Lawrence Henry (2012-)

Area
  - Total: 360 km^{2} (140 sq mi)

Population (2021)
  - Total: 834

Sand Creek (Wapishana: Suburun Tao) is a village in the Upper Takutu-Upper Essequibo Region of Guyana. Sand Creek is inhabited by Wapishana Amerindians. It is located on the Rupununi River. The main language spoken in the village is Wapishana with English as secondary language.

== Overview ==
The economy of Sand Creek is based on livestock ranching and subsistence farming. The village has a primary and secondary school as well as a health centre.

The village is known for the Sand Creek Rodeo which takes place every Easter Monday. The rodeo started in the 1980s as a pastime for the villagers, but has turned into a professional rodeo attracting visitors from all over the country.

The beaches near the village are used by the yellow-spotted river turtle to lay their eggs. Traditionally both the turtles and eggs were considered a delicacy. The SRDC (South Rupununi District Council) embarked on a wildlife conservation program in Sand Creek. On 11 September 2021, the first turtle festival was held, releasing more than 200 turtles into the wild. The SRDC plans to make the festival an annual event.

In May 2021 the Rupununi River flooded, affecting 114 houses and many hectares of farm land.

== Transport ==
Sand Creek is served by the Sand Creek Airport. The village can be accessed by road from Lethem, however a stream has to be forded.
