= Rugby union in Guyana =

Rugby union located in Guyana

- Country: Guyana
- Governing body: Guyana Rugby Football Union
- National team: Guyana
- First played: Early 20th century
- Registered players: 1032

National competitions
- Rugby World Cup; Rugby World Cup Sevens; IRB Sevens World Series

Rugby union in Guyana is a minor but growing sport. As of 2011, the country is ranked 66th by the IRB, with 1032 registered players.

Guyana is geographically in South America, but competes in North American competitions, and is a member of NAWIRA as its rugby contacts tend to be with the Caribbean nations, rather than the Southern Cone

== Governing body ==
The national governing body is the Guyana Rugby Football Union.

== History ==
Guyana is a former British colony, known as "British Guiana", and the game there was introduced to there by the British. For a number of years, the local rugby scene was dominated by expatriates.

In 1954, the Argyll and Sutherland Highlanders regiment was stationed in Guyana, and formed their own team to play local sides in the colony. They played sides formed of British and Portuguese residents of Georgetown and the sugar estates. The soldiers had not played for a long while, but had an advantage due to their physical fitness.

Guyana has done particularly well in the Caribbean Sevens.

It also supports two national teams.

== See also ==
- Guyana national rugby union team
- Guyana women's national rugby union team
