= Karinambo =

Karinambo Karanambo
- village
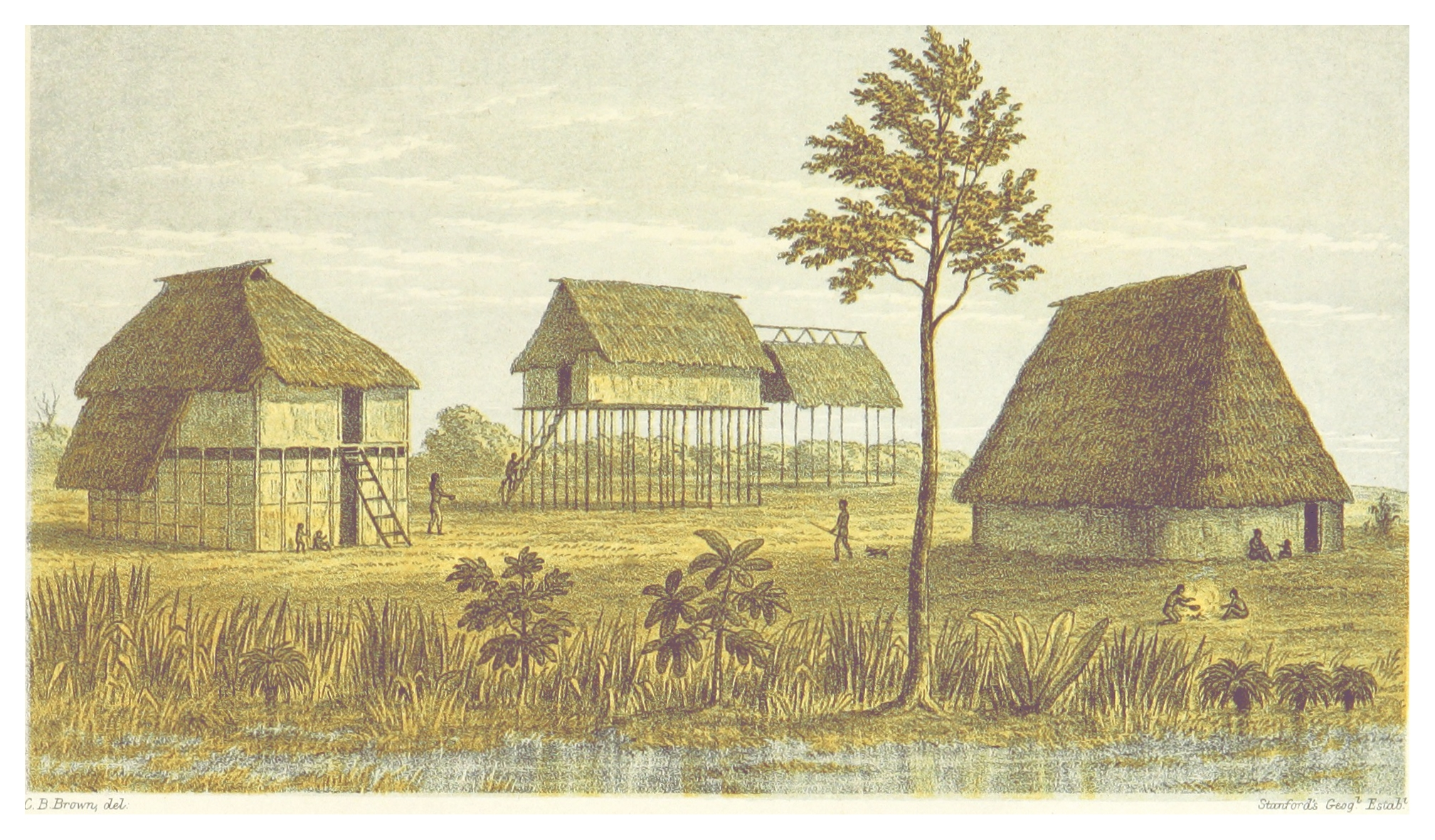
- Illustration of Karinambo from Canoe and Camp Life in British Guiana by Charles Barrington Brown

- Location in Guyana
- Coordinates: 3.7511°N 59.3118°W
- Country: Guyana
- Region: Upper Takutu-Upper Essequibo

Population (2012)
  - Total: 19

Karinambo (also Karanambo) is a village in Guyana. Charles Barrington Brown stayed in the Amerindian village near the Takutu Savanna in the 1870s.

It is situated along the upper Rupununi, 45 km north of the Kanuku Mountains. Karanambo's population as of the 2012 census is 19.

In the 1920s, Edward “Tiny” McTurk chose the area as a headquarters for balata bleeding midway between the confluence of the Essequibo and the Rupununi River. The area experiences heavy flooding during the rainy season, except at Karanambo, but the area was not already significantly settled due to negative legends about the area.

The Rupununi savannah became a major cattle producing region, and Karanambo was a ranch during that time. After the decline in beef prices, Karanambo came to use for eco-tourism; fishing, bird-watching, or other outdoor exploration. Considered "out of touch with the rest of the world", the area lacks phones, postal facilities, proper roads or public transport. Evelyn Waugh's A Handful of Dust is a fictionalized account of the author's experience in the region.

Karanambo Airport provides service into the area.
