= Port Kaituma =

Place in the Essequibo

Port Kaituma Small Town
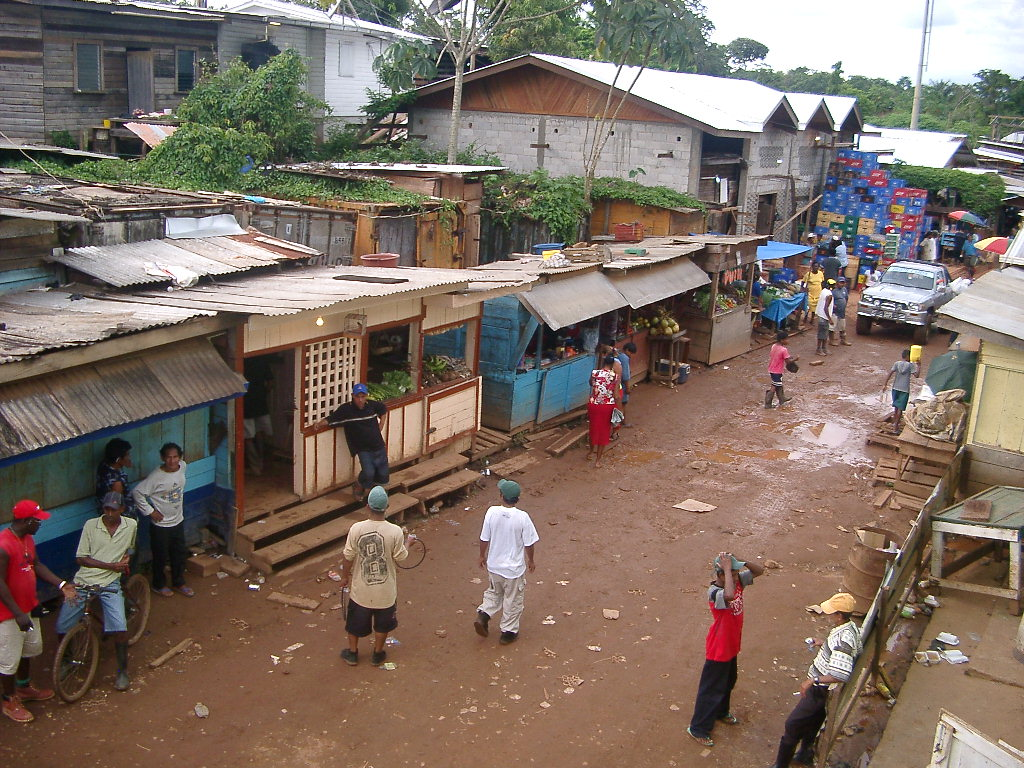
- Port Kaituma Compound

- Location in Guyana
- Coordinates: 7°43′34″N 59°53′3″W
- Country: Guyana
- Region: Barima-Waini

Government
  - Type: Neighbourhood democratic council

Population (2012)
  - Total: 1,152

Port Kaituma is a small village within the Barima-Waini administrative region of Guyana. It became known internationally as a gateway village to the Peoples Temple settlement in nearby Jonestown. It has long been a hub for mining in the area.

== History ==
Although Indigenous settlements existed along the Kaituma River for some time, it was only after the discovery of manganese at nearby Matthews Ridge that Port Kaituma was developed. As Matthews Ridge was not located on a navigable river, a canal was cut from the Kaituma River and Port Kaituma was constructed. It was officially declared a Port on July 2nd 1960 under the authority of the Governor of then British Guiana. At the time of the manganese mining, Port Kaituma had three separate areas. The mine managers' house and the guest house were in a large clearing separated by a short road through the forest from the main rail-head and manganese loading facility. A longer road led in the opposite direction to the area known as 'Bottom Floor' where the workers lived.

The manganese was transported from Matthews Ridge via a 64-kilometre (40 mi) railway and then shipped from Port Kaituma to Chaguaramas Bay in Trinidad, from where it was distributed for industrial use with a large proportion going to Stavanger in Norway. The project was operated by subsidiaries of Union Carbide.

Two Trinidadian oil tankers, the Ambrosio and the Inverrosa, were converted into manganese carriers as part of this project. They made the trip from Port Kaituma to Chaguaramas on a regular four-day cycle for much of the 1960s. With a displacement of just under 3,000 tonnes, they were originally built in the mid 1920s with a shallow draft to ship oil across shallow sand-bars at the mouth of Lake Maracaibo in Venezuela. The ability to slip over sand bars in very shallow water was essential to their being able to get across Waini Bar at the mouth of the Kaituma River.

Port Kaituma's significance grew further following the proclamation from the then-President of Guyana, Forbes Burnham, that Guyana should become more self-sufficient by populating the interior of the country. Matthews Ridge was highlighted as a potential new capital city, and within Port Kaituma a large secondary school was constructed to educate students sent from all over Guyana. During its heyday, the school boasted more than 800 students, of which most were housed in two large dormitory buildings.

In the 1970s, Jim Jones' commune of Jonestown was built 11 kilometres (7 mi) away from Port Kaituma. The first killings of the November 1978 Jonestown deaths occurred in Port Kaituma when Leo Ryan, a US Congressman from California, and others were gunned down while boarding a small Twin Otter aircraft on the local airstrip. In the aftermath and clean-up operation that ensued, the Guyanese Government prohibited any dead bodies from being buried on the site of the commune. This however didn't stop locals from scavenging the items left behind at the property.

Over the next 25 years, a large foreign-owned logging company came and went, the manganese factory at Matthews Ridge ceased working and the railway linking Matthews Ridge and Port Kaituma was closed and in some parts cut up. The school's importance diminished and fell into a state of disrepair.

Today, Kaituma serves as the gateway to the nearby jungle where the now predominant industry of small-scale gold mining takes place. The transient nature of many of these pork-knockers (gold miners) has led to problems of gun crime, robbery, murder and bribery in the unpoliced hinterlands. This however does not perturb a continual flow of workers through the town, including a recent influx of Brazilians.

== Public services ==
Port Kaituma Community School provides nursery through secondary education. A hospital was commissioned in 2020. Also in 2020, Guyana Gold Board opened an office in Port Kaituma for testing and buying gold.

== See also ==
- Mining in Guyana
