= Trans Guyana Airways =

Guyanese airline

Trans Guyana Airways (TGA)
IATA	ICAO	Call sign
TG	TGY	TRANS GUYANA
- Founded: 1951; 75 years ago
- Commenced operations: 1956; 70 years ago
- Hubs: Eugene F. Correia International Airport
- Fleet size: 10
- Destinations: over 22
- Parent company: Correia Group of Companies
- Headquarters: Ogle, East Coast Demerara, Guyana
- Key people: Michael Correia Jr.
- Website: https://transguyana.net/

Trans Guyana Airways Limited is a Guyanese airline which commenced operations in 1956 in Georgetown, Guyana, with a single float airplane. Since then, the company has expanded its fleet to provide domestic and regional transportation, and to Guyana's remote areas.

Trans Guyana Airways is a member of the Correia Group of Companies along with Caribbean Aviation Maintenance Services, Evergreen Adventures, Baganara Island Resort and the Correia Mining Company.

In addition to serving Guyana's interior, Trans Guyana Airways works in cooperation with Gum Air to provide a scheduled air-link between Paramaribo (Suriname) and Georgetown (Guyana). The carriers operate seven days a week between Eugene F. Correia International Airport (SYEC) and Zorg en Hoop Airport (SMZO).

Trans Guyana linked with KLM in 2019 to provide flights from Guyana to the Netherlands via Suriname in 12 hours.

== Fleet ==
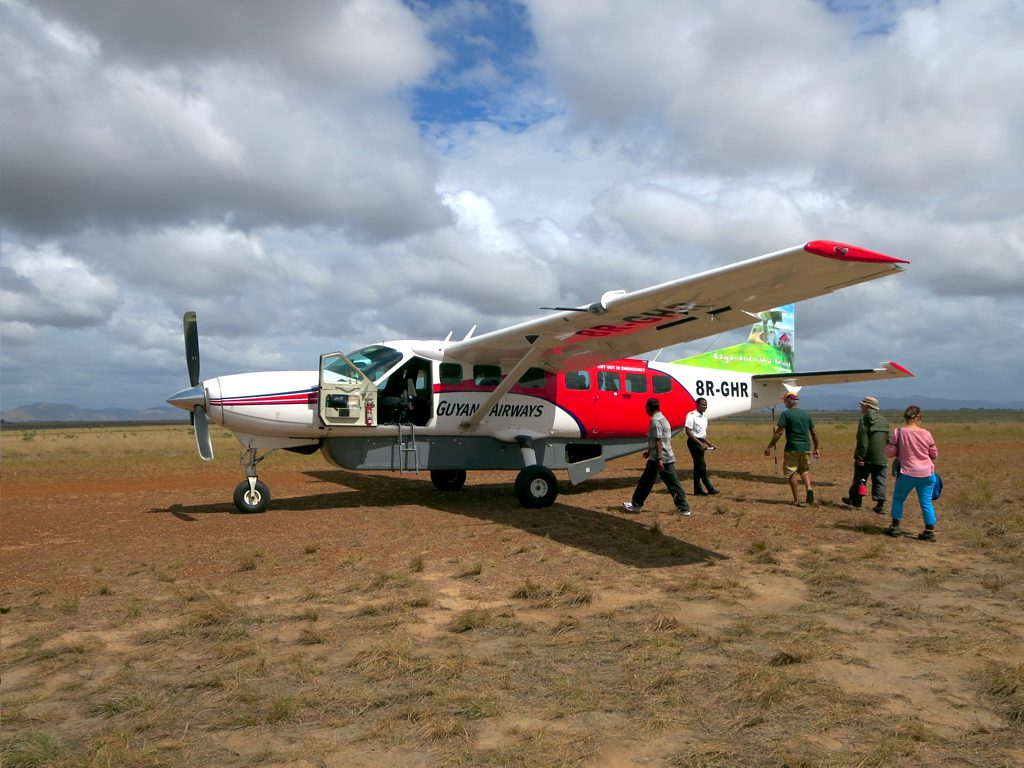
A Cessna 208 of Trans Guyana Airways at Karanambu Lodge

Trans Guyana Airways operates a fleet of 14 aircraft with capacity varying from nine to 20 seats.

Trans Guyana Airways fleet
Aircraft	In fleet	Passengers	Notes
Cessna 208B Grand Caravan	10	1 pilot plus 13 passengers	
Britten Norman BN-2A-27 Islander	1	1 pilot plus 9 passengers	
Beechcraft 1900D	3 (as of July 2026)	2 pilots plus 19 passengers	
Total	14		

== Destinations ==
Trans Guyana Airways offers scheduled commercial services to the following interior locations:

=== Guyana ===
- Region 1
  - Mabaruma
  - Matthews Ridge
  - Port Kaituma
  - Baramita
- Region 4
  - Georgetown (Eugene F. Correia International Airport), hub
- Region 7
  - Baganara Island/Bartica
  - Bartica
  - Chi-Chi West
  - Ekereku Bottom
  - Ekereku Center
  - Imbaimadai
  - Kamarang
  - Kurupung
  - Olive Creek
  - Aurora
- Region 8
  - Kaieteur Falls
  - Iwokrama Forest
- Region 9
  - Orinduik Falls
  - Annai
  - Karinambo
  - Lethem

=== Suriname ===
- Paramaribo (Zorg en Hoop Airport, Johan Adolf Pengel Airport, Eduard Alexander Gummels International Airport)

=== Barbados ===
- Bridgetown

=== Brazil ===
- Boa Vista
