= Eugene F. Correia International Airport =

Airport in Guyana

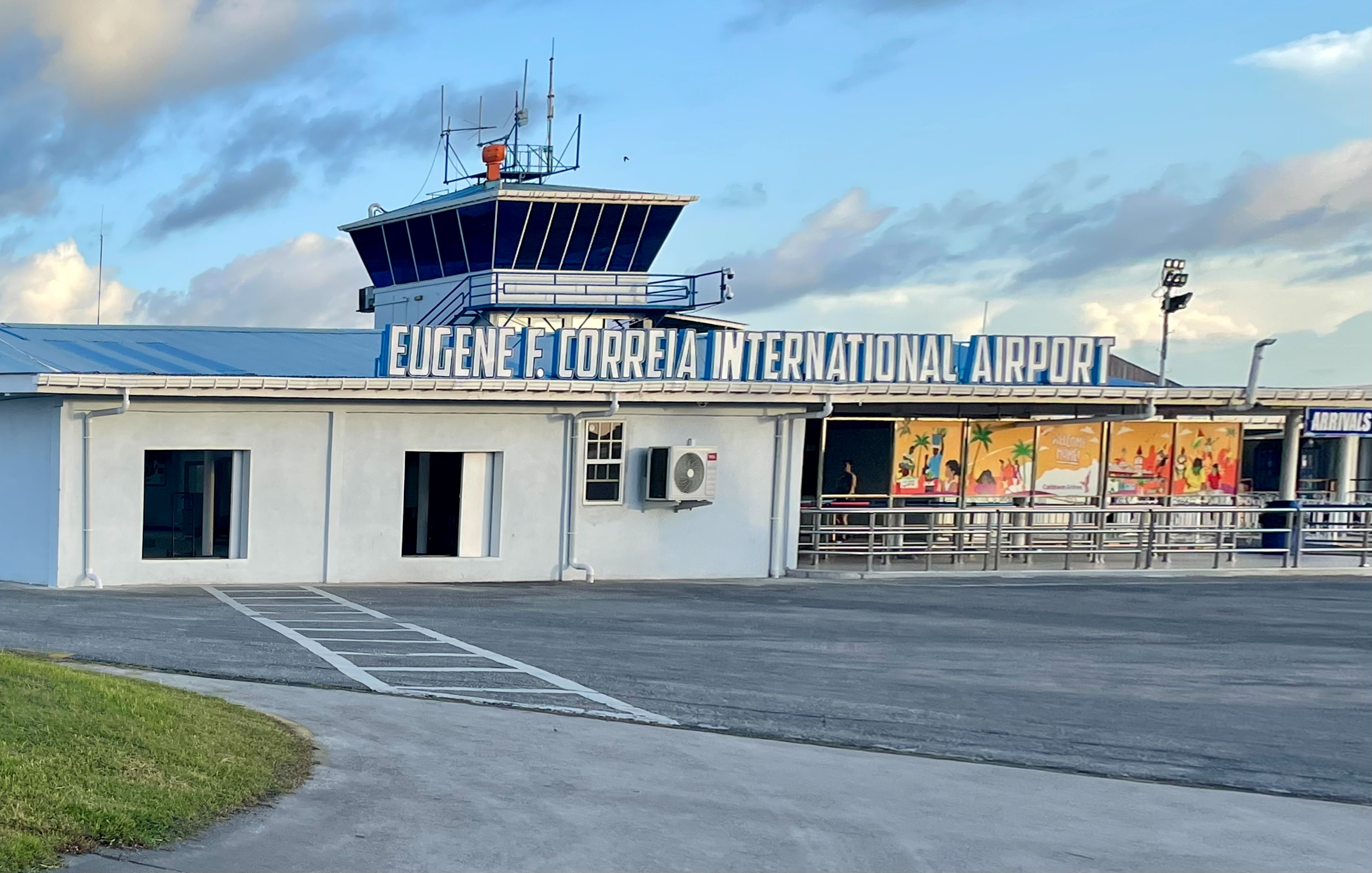
- IATA: OGL; ICAO: SYEC

Summary
- Airport type: Public
- Operator: Ogle Airport Inc.
- Serves: Georgetown, Demerara-Mahaica, Guyana
- Elevation AMSL: 10 ft / 3 m
- Coordinates: 6°48′26″N 58°06′21″W
- Website: ogleairportguyana.com

Map
- Location of the airport in Guyana

Runways
Direction	Length		Surface
Direction	m	ft	Surface
07/25	1,280	4,200	Concrete
- Source: GCM Google Maps

Eugene F. Correia International Airport (IATA: OGL, ICAO: SYEC) is located on the Atlantic Ocean coast of Guyana, 6 kilometres (3.7 mi) east of the capital, Georgetown, in the Demerara-Mahaica region.

In 2013, LIAT began scheduled passenger airline flights between the airport and Barbados, thus switching over its former air service into Cheddi Jagan International Airport.

The airport was formerly known as Georgetown-Ogle International Airport and is the second international airport along with the Cheddi Jagan International Airport to serve Georgetown and its vicinity.

== History ==
Efforts to expand the airport were started in 2003; the lengthened and expanded runway is now in service, and a ceremony to formally open the new airport terminal was held in March 2007.

OGL received its port-of-entry certification in 2009. It has a Class 1A, 4,200 feet (1,300 m)-long runway made of concrete (07-25). The former runway 07R-25L is now being used as a taxiway only. It operates under Visual Flight Rules (VFR) and Instrument Flight Rules (IFR). The airport is capable of handling smaller business jets, regional turboprop airliners, such as the Beechcraft 1900D flown by Trans Guyana Airways as well as the ATR-72-600 operated by Caribbean Airlines.

The airport was renamed Eugene Correia Airport in 2016 after Portuguese Guyanese legislator Eugene Correia.

== Airlines and destinations ==
Airlines	Destinations
Caribbean Airlines	Barbados, Port of Spain
Gum Air	Paramaribo–Zanderij
InterCaribbean Airways	Barbados
LIAT	Antigua
Trans Guyana Airways	Kaieteur, Lethem, Paramaribo–Zanderij

== Other facilities ==
The airline Fly Jamaica Airways formerly maintained its Guyana ticket office in the Wings Aviation hangar at the airport, although Fly Jamaica Airways served Georgetown via Cheddi Jagan International Airport, located south of the city. Fly Jamaica is no longer in business.

Omni Helicopters Guyana Inc., a subsidiary of Omni Helicopters International (OHI), operates Sikorsky S-92 helicopters from the airport in support of offshore oil and gas exploration activities.

== See also ==
- List of airports in Guyana
- Transport in Guyana
