= Transport in Guyana =

The transport sector comprises the physical infrastructure, docks and vehicle, terminals, fleets, ancillary equipment and service delivery of all the various modes of transport operating in Guyana.

== City transportation ==
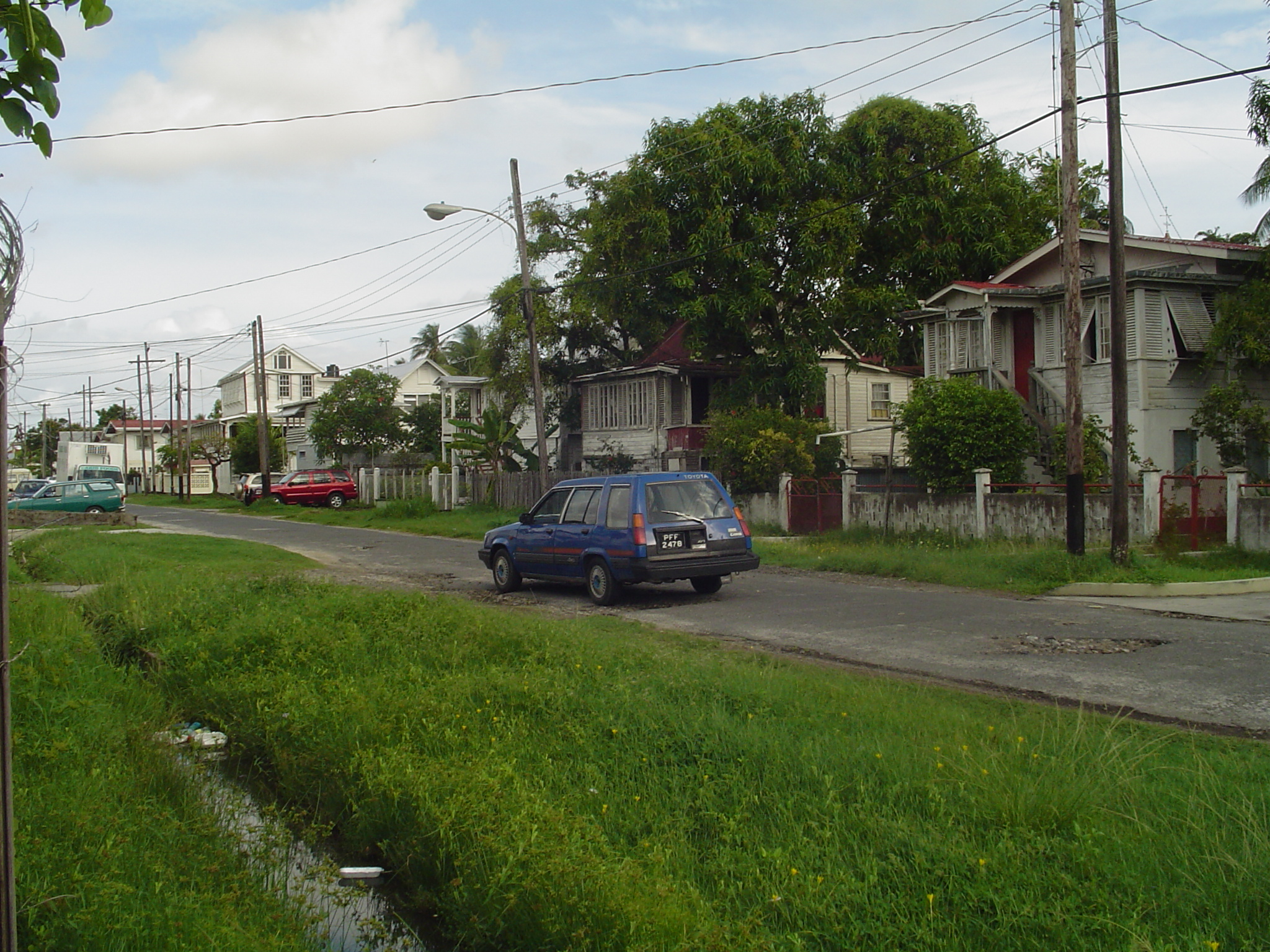
Private transportation in Georgetown

In Guyana's capital Georgetown, there are designated bus stops for mini buses for most routes but some buses still pick up passengers at virtually any point on their routes. This practice often poses a serious inconvenience to other vehicles by disrupting the normal flow of traffic.

Starting in 2010, all taxis must be painted yellow, a regulation designed to protect consumers and to distinguish the vehicles from others that are often used in committing crimes. All taxis are registered under the term "Hackney Carriage" and carry the letter H at the beginning of their number plates. There are scores of taxi services operating in Georgetown but its equally easy to "flag a ride" in the central business district.

Road conditions vary immensely, and maintenance is sometimes deficient. In 2006 there was one operational set of traffic lights but in July 2007, a modern system was installed by Indian firm CMS Traffic Systems Limited, through a US$2.1 million line of credit to the government from India's EXIM Bank, providing signals for both vehicular and pedestrian traffic at all major intersections in Georgetown.

=== Minibuses in Guyana ===
As of February 2016, there were 19 minibus routes in Guyana and most of them begin or are fully contained in Georgetown, Guyana.

Minibus routes in Guyana
Route Number	Service Area
21	Charity/Supernaam
31	Patentia
32	Parika
33	Leguan
40	Kitty/Campbellville
41	South Ruimveldt
42	Timehri
43	Linden
44	Mahaica
45	Central Georgetown
46	Lodge
47	East & West Ruimveldt
48	Sophia
50	New Amsterdam
56	Rosignol/New Amsterdam
63	Corentyne
72	Mahdia
73	Bartica
94	Lethem

In 2015, the Ministry of Public Works estimated that 60 percent of Guyana's productive labour force used public transportation daily, which is widely available and fairly reliable. They also stated that the eight major bus routes, 31, 32, 40, 41, 42, 43, 44 and 45, accounted for 67 percent of the total public bus fleet in Guyana. Their survey found that 41% of commuters on the major routes were satisfied.

== Long distance transportation ==
=== Roads ===
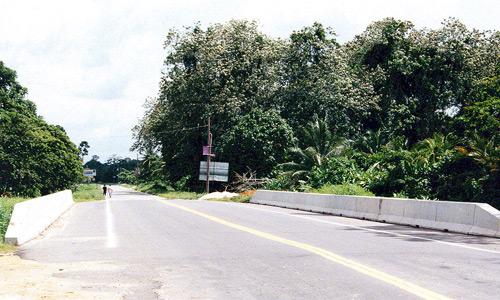
The Soesdyke-Linden Highway tends to serve the mining and forestry sectors.

The main coastal roads are, from west to east, the Essequibo Coast Road, the Parika to Vreed en Hoop Road, the East Coast Demerara and West Coast Berbice Roads, and the Corentyne Highway from New Amsterdam to Moleson Creek (86 kilometers). All these roads are paved and their speed limit vary between 50 and 100 km/h.

South of Georgetown the primary road is the East Bank Demerara Road, a four-lane road from Rumiveldt to Providence and two-lane from Providence to Timehri Georgetown to Timehri, where the Cheddi Jagan International Airport - Timehri (CJIAT) is located.

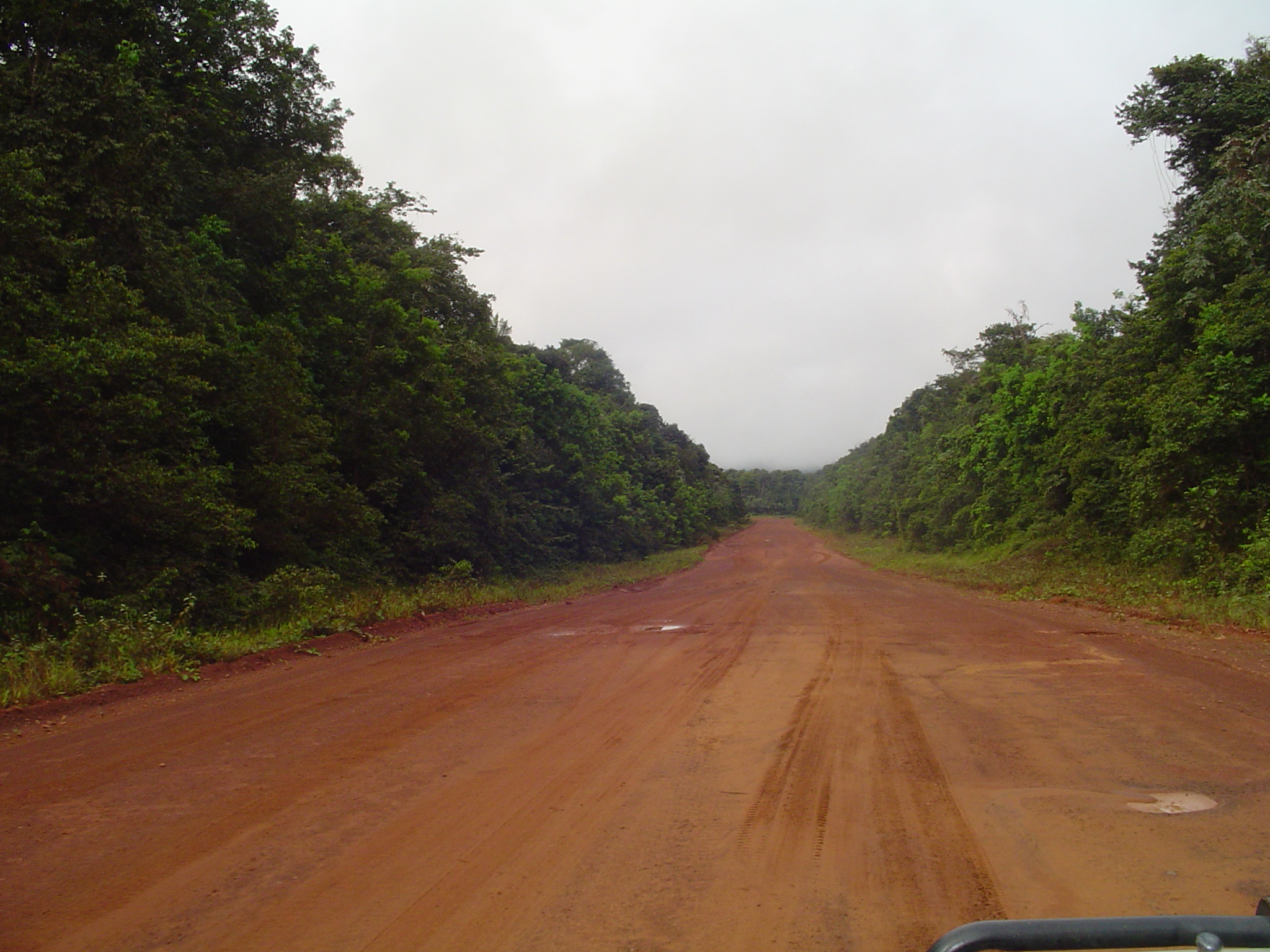
Mabura Road south of Linden

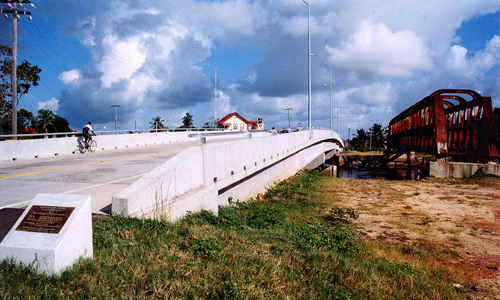
Mahaicony bridge in 2006

It is now possible to travel overland to Suriname by taking the ferry on the Guyana side at Moleson Creek and crossing the Corentyne River over to Suriname at South Drain. While travel to Brazil is via the old cattle trail it has been upgraded into a fair weather track that passes through the bauxite-producing town of Linden and ending at Lethem.

=== Roadway signage ===
In 2008 Guyana acceded to the 1968 United Nations' Vienna Convention on Road Signs and Signals concerning standardization for its roadway signage.

=== Bridges ===
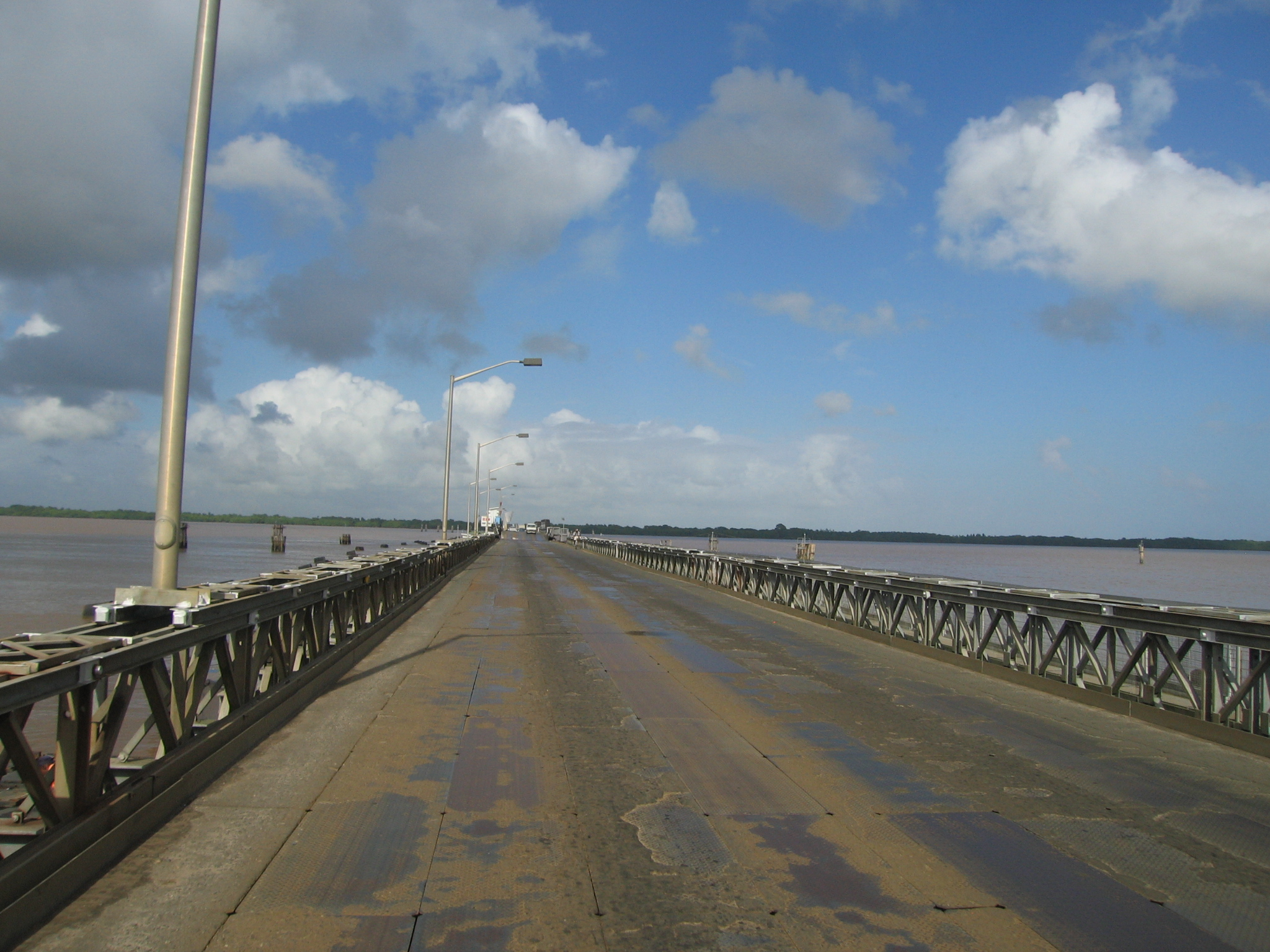
The Demerara Harbour Bridge crosses mouth of the Demerara River. It is a floating bridge.

The government of Guyana provides considerable subsidy for the upkeep of the Demerara Harbour Bridge. The bridge has been in existence since 1978 and currently notwithstanding the rigorous maintenance regime, sits at the end of its useful life.

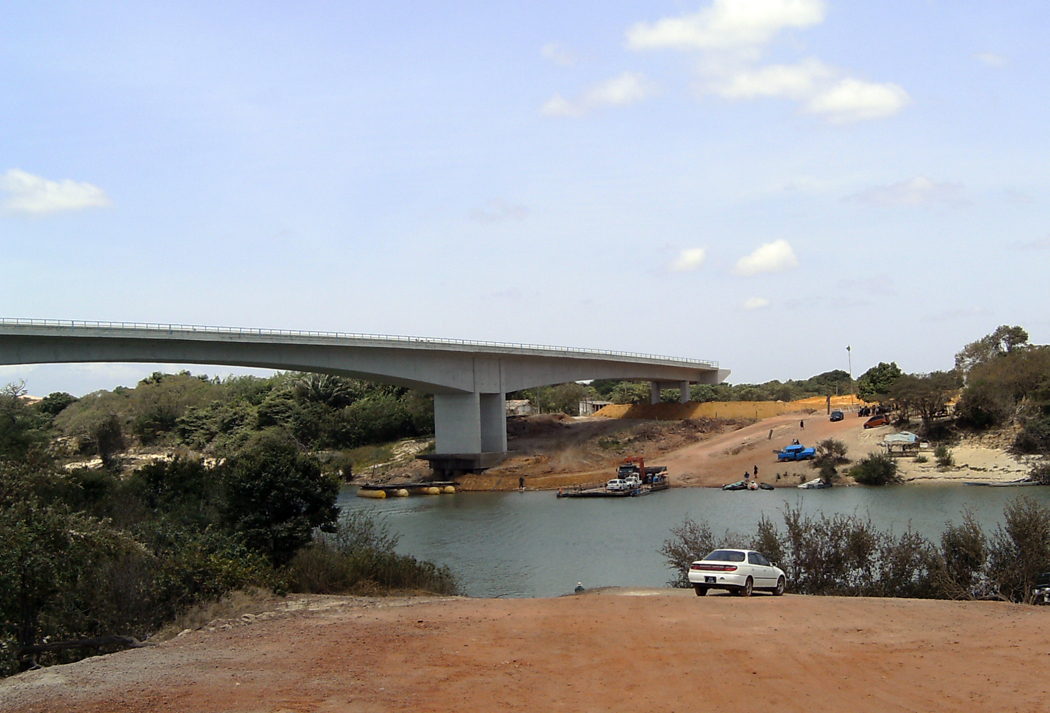
Construction continues on a bridge linking Guyana and Brazil at Lethem

In 2007, construction resumed on the Takutu River Bridge to link Guyana and Brazil in the southwest region of Guyana near Lethem. The bridge was officially opened on September 14, 2009, enabling economic interests in northern Brazil to link by road to the port at Georgetown. Unprecedented construction and population growth in Lethem since the bridge's opening reflects the significantly increased traffic and movement of goods facilitated by the bridge. The Takutu Bridge is seen as the first of several joint projects between Guyana and Brazil intended to facilitate cargo traffic: Brazil is expected to subsidize the paving of the Lethem-to-Georgetown road, a development that would have profound impacts on the area's economy and environment. Dredging of the Georgetown port to accommodate deeper-draft cargo vessels is also being planned.

=== Rail transport ===
In the Matthew's Ridge area, there is a 51.5 km (32 mi) railway service.

A railway service was once operated in Linden for the movement of bauxite ore. However trucks are now used to transport the bauxite ore.

== Ferries ==
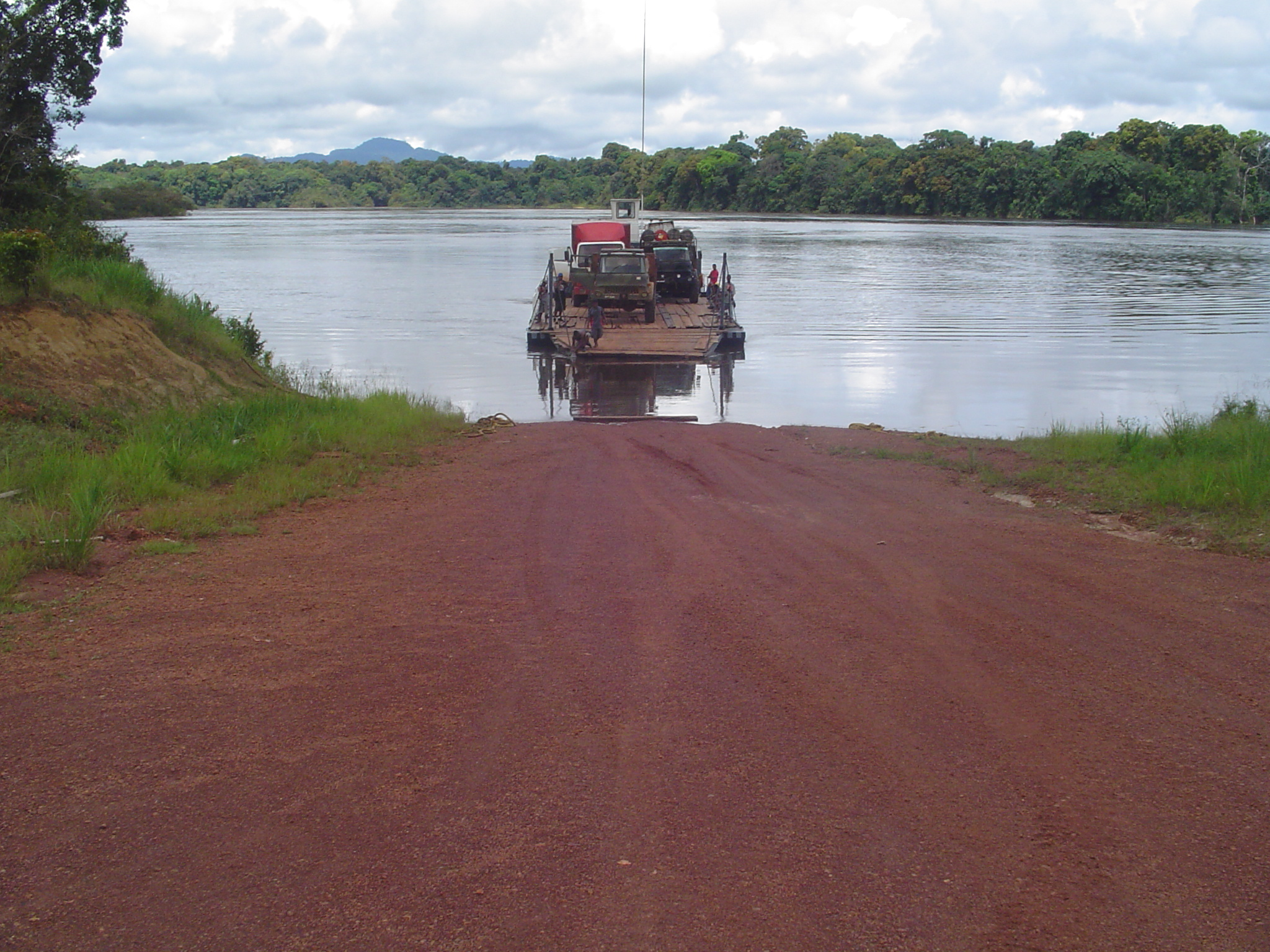
Kurupukari ferry crossing on Essequibo River

Since the opening of the Berbice River Bridge in December 2008 the Transport and Harbour Department has reduced its service to only one round trip daily between Rosignol and New Amsterdam.

There is also a ferry linking Guyana and Suriname crossing the Corentyne River from Springlands (at Corriverton in Guyana) to Nieuw Nickerie, a town in Suriname. Leaving Rosignol at 8:00hrs and now at 14:30hrs respectively. This service is primarily geared at offsetting the high cost for crossing the Berbice Bridge for school children, public servants and the elderly.

== Air transportation ==
In 2010, the International Civil Aviation Organization (ICAO) conferred "international" status to the air terminal at Ogle (IATA: OGL, ICAO: SYGO), a former sugarcane airstrip just a few kilometres south of Georgetown's center. In anticipation of increased regional air traffic to the facility, an EU-subsidized construction project began in January of that year, intended to upgrade the terminal building and extend the primary paved runway to a usable length of 4000 feet. Ogle is the hub for domestic flights to Guyana's interior and offers once-daily service to the in-town airstrip in Paramaribo, capital of neighboring Suriname.

== Challenges and future development ==
The government of Guyana and Brazil signed a Memorandum of Understanding in 2012 to explore the development of Hydro Power, Linden-Lethem Road and Deep Water Harbour to boost bilateral trade and cooperation.

Construction of a bridge across the Berbice River at Crab Island and D'Edwards on the East and West banks of Berbice River was completed in 2008.

In 2012, The Government of Guyana signed a contract with CHEC of China for the expansion of the runway at the CJIA and the construction of a modern terminal building at an estimated cost of 131Million US Dollars.

== Statistics ==
=== Railways ===
Total: 187 km (all dedicated to ore transport)
Standard gauge: 139 km; 4 ft 8 1/2 in (1,435 mm)
Narrow gauge: 48 km; 3 ft (914 mm) gauge

=== Highways ===
Total: 7,970 km
Paved: 590 km
Unpaved: 7,380 km (1996 est.)

- Driving is on the left, a practice inherited from United Kingdom colonial authorities. Guyana and Suriname are the only two countries on the (in-land) American continent who still drive on the left.

=== Waterways ===
Guyana has 5,900 km (3,700 mi) total of navigable waterways; Berbice River, Demerara River, and Essequibo River are navigable by oceangoing vessels for 150, 100, and 80 km (93, 62, and 50 mi) respectively.

=== Seaports and harbors ===
- Bartica
- Georgetown
- Linden
- New Amsterdam
- Parika

=== Merchant marine ===
total: 1 ship (1,000 gross tonnage (GT) or over) totaling 1,023 GT/1,972 long tons deadweight (DWT)
ships by type: (1999 est.)

- cargo ship 1

=== Airports ===
51 (1999 est.)

International Airport: Cheddi Jagan International Airport

Other Major Airport/s: Eugene F. Correia International Airport

Airports - with paved runways:
total: 9
1,524 to 2,437 m: 2
914 to 1,523 m: 1
under 914 m: 2 (1999 est.)

Airports - with unpaved runways:
total: 84
1,524 to 2,437 m: 2
914 to 1,523 m: 7
under 914 m: 37 (1999 est.)

== See also ==
- Rail transport by country
- Proposed high-speed rail by country
