= ASTA Linhas Aéreas =

Brazilian charter airline

IATA	ICAO	Call sign
0A	SUL	ASTA
- Founded: 1995
- Commenced operations: 2009
- AOC #: 9,550 - October 19, 2022
- Hubs: Cuiabá
- Fleet size: 3
- Parent company: ASTA Táxi Aéreo
- Headquarters: Várzea Grande, Brazil
- Key people: Alexandre Palhares de Oliveira Silva
- Website: voeasta.com.br

ASTA Linhas Aéreas is a domestic airline based in Cuiabá, Brazil. Founded in 2009, it operates regular charter flights.

== History ==
ASTA (América do Sul Táxi Aéreo Ltda) has existed since 1995 as an air taxi company but on December 29, 2009, the company received authorization to operate regular flights albeit still under charter status.

On August 22, 2019, ASTA signed an interline agreement with Azul Brazilian Airlines. According to this agreement, ASTA would provide feeder services to Azul flights to and from the base at Cuiabá. This agreement was later terminated because Azul started operating feeder services via its subsidiary Azul Conecta.

On April 8, 2021, ASTA decided to suspend indefinitely all regular flights but retained the AOC for such flights. The company continues to operate as an air taxi company.

== Destinations ==
The following destinations were once served by ASTA regularly (until 2021):

City	Airport	Notes
Água Boa	Água Boa Airport	
Alta Floresta	Piloto Osvaldo Marques Dias Airport	
Aripuanã	Aripuanã Airport	
Barra do Garças	Barra do Garças Airport	
Campo Novo do Parecis	Private aerodrome SJKA	
Canarana	Canarana Airport	
Confresa	Confresa Airport	
Cuiabá	Mal. Rondon International Airport	
Itaituba	Itaituba Airport	
Juara	Inácio Luís do Nascimento Airport	
Juína	Juína Airport	
Lucas do Rio Verde	Bom Futuro Airport	
Matupá	Orlando Villas-Bôas Regional Airport	
Nova Mutum	Brig. Eduardo Gomes Airport	
Novo Progresso	Novo Progresso Airport	
Pontes e Lacerda	Pontes e Lacerda Airport	
Primavera do Leste	Primavera do Leste Airport	
Rondonópolis	Maestro Marinho Franco Airport	
Santarém	Maestro Wilson Fonseca Airport	
São Félix do Araguaia	São Félix do Araguaia Airport	
Sapezal	Private aerodrome SICJ	
Sinop	Pres. João Figueiredo Airport	
Tangará da Serra	Tangará da Serra Airport	
Vila Rica	Vila Rica Airport	

== Fleet ==
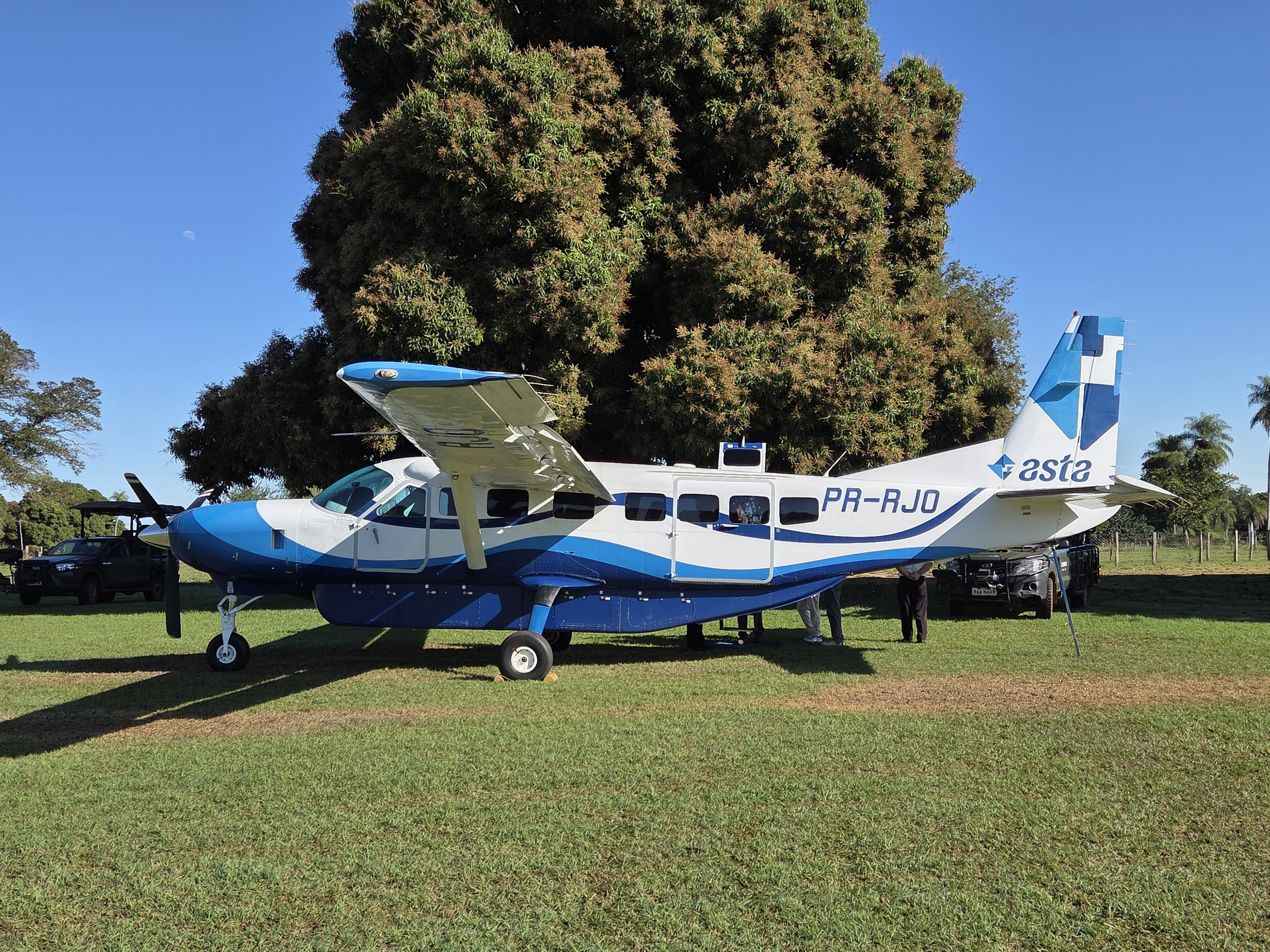
Cessna Grand Caravan 208B

As of July 2026 the fleet of ASTA Linhas Aéreas included the following aircraft:

Aircraft	Total	Orders	Passengers (Y)	Notes
Cessna Caravan 208B	3	–	9	Introduced in 2009

== See also ==
- List of airlines of Brazil
