= Cruiser Linhas Aéreas =

Brazilian airline

IATA	ICAO	Call sign
J6	VCR	VOE CRUISER
- Commenced operations: 2001
- Ceased operations: 2010
- Fleet size: 1
- Headquarters: Curitiba, Brazil
- Website: www.voecruiser.com.br

Cruiser Linhas Aéreas was an airline based in Curitiba, Brazil. It used to operate domestic services to 10 destinations in the states of Paraná, Rondônia and Mato Grosso, as well as charter and air taxi services within Brazil. Its main base is Curitiba-Bacacheri Airport (BFH).

== History ==
The airline began with air taxi services, but added scheduled services on 4 June 2001.

On March 4, 2010 National Civil Aviation Agency of Brazil suspended the operations of the airline due to maintenance problems. The license was revoked on July 17, 2012.

== Destinations ==
In February 2010, before having its operational license suspended, Cruiser Linhas Aéreas operated services to the following destinations:

- Aripuanã – Aripuanã Airport
- Barra do Garças – Barra do Garças Airport
- Cuiabá – Mal. Rondon International Airport
- Goiânia – Santa Genoveva Airport
- Guarantã do Norte
- Itaituba – Itaituba Airport
- Juara – Inácio Luís do Nascimento Airport
- Juína – Juína Airport
- Juruena – Juruena Airport
- Lucas do Rio Verde – Bom Futuro Airport
- Novo Progresso – Novo Progresso Airport
- Rio Verde de Goiás – Gal. Leite de Castro Airport
- Rondonópolis – Maestro Marinho Franco Airport
- Santarém – Maestro Wilson Fonseca Airport
- Sapezal
- Sinop – Sinop Airport

== Fleet ==
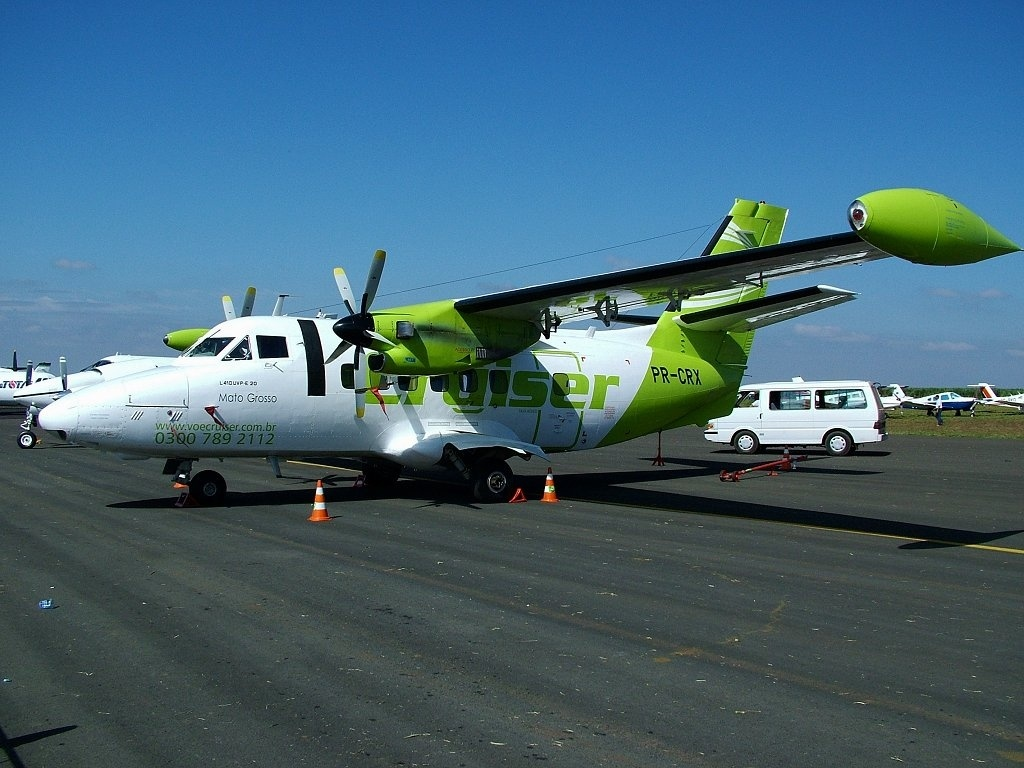
Let L-410

As of June 2010, the fleet of Cruiser Linhas Aéreas included the following aircraft:

Cruiser Linhas Aéreas fleet
Aircraft	In fleet	Former	Passengers (Y)	Years of operation
Embraer EMB 110 Bandeirante	1	2	19	
Let L-410 UVP	-	1	19	

== See also ==
- List of defunct airlines of Brazil
