= Nova Xavantina =

- Municipality
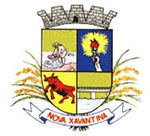
- Flag Coat of arms

- Coordinates: 14°40′22″S 52°21′10″W
- Country: Brazil
- Region: Center-West
- State: Mato Grosso
- Mesoregion: Nordeste Mato-Grossense

Population (2020)
  - Total: 20,944
- Time zone: UTC−3 (BRT)

Nova Xavantina is a municipality in the state of Mato Grosso in the Central-West Region of Brazil.

== History ==
The area now comprising Nova Xavantina was originally inhabited by the Xavante, a Jê-speaking people who once occupied a large territory in eastern Mato Grosso. In 1660, the bandeirante Bartolomeu Bueno da Silva arrived in the area, capturing and enslaving much of the indigenous Xavante population.

The modern municipality can be traced to the 1944 Roncador-Xingu Expedition, part of the larger March to the West policy enacted by Getúlio Vargas during the Estado Novo period. Until this point, much of Brazil's interior was sparsely populated. In 1944, the expedition arrived at the Rio das Mortes, building a settlement on the south bank which they named Vila da Xavantina and a settlement on the north bank called Nova Brasília, which were both later incorporated as a district of the Barra do Garças municipality.

Beginning in the 1970s, the region underwent significant population growth, emerging as a major center for agricultural production in Mato Grosso. Agricultural colonization projects brought immigrants to Mato Grosso from other regions of Brazil, primarily the south.

In 1971, a bridge across the Rio das Mortes was opened, forming a crucial connection between the much larger city of Barra do Garças to the south and less-developed areas north of the Rio das Mortes, and connecting the settlements of Nova Brasília and Vila da Xavantina. Development in the municipalities to the north of Nova Xavantina in the Araguaia valley such as Água Boa, Canarana, Querência, Vila Rica, was facilitated by the bridge and made Nova Xavantina an important center for agricultural expansion. The populations of both settlements began to grow dramatically throughout the 70s as agricultural production expanded. In 1980, Vila da Xavantina and Nova Brasília were joined to form a new municipality, independent of Barra do Garças, called Nova Xavantina.

Agriculture has continued to expand throughout the 80s, 90s, 2000s, and 2010s, driving continued population growth and economic development in Nova Xavantina. A campus of the State University of Mato Grosso (Unemat) was founded in 1991, providing another reason for immigration to the municipality.

== Geography ==
Located at 14º40'24"S and 52º21'11"W, Nova Xavantina lies in the cerrado ecoregion. Under the Köppen climate classification, Nova Xavantina has a tropical savanna climate (Köppen: Aw) and is very warm year-round with a rainy season from approximately October to March and a dry season from April to September. It is within the bounds of the Brazilian Legal Amazon. The Rio das Mortes, a major tributary of the Rio Araguaia flows through the center of Nova Xavantina. Though technically in the Amazon Time Zone (UTC-4), Nova Xavantina and other cities in the Araguaia valley unofficially observe Brasília Time (UTC-3). Since the 1980s, Nova Xavantina and the surrounding region have undergone extensive deforestation due to agricultural expansion.

== Climate ==
Climate data for Nova Xavantina (1981–2010)
Month	Jan	Feb	Mar	Apr	May	Jun	Jul	Aug	Sep	Oct	Nov	Dec	Year
Mean daily maximum °C (°F)	31.8 (89.2)	32.2 (90.0)	32.5 (90.5)	33.4 (92.1)	33.0 (91.4)	33.0 (91.4)	33.7 (92.7)	35.7 (96.3)	36.5 (97.7)	35.5 (95.9)	33.0 (91.4)	31.8 (89.2)	33.5 (92.3)
Daily mean °C (°F)	25.4 (77.7)	25.5 (77.9)	25.4 (77.7)	25.2 (77.4)	23.4 (74.1)	21.8 (71.2)	21.9 (71.4)	23.7 (74.7)	26.3 (79.3)	27.0 (80.6)	25.9 (78.6)	25.5 (77.9)	24.8 (76.6)
Mean daily minimum °C (°F)	23.7 (74.7)	23.5 (74.3)	23.3 (73.9)	22.4 (72.3)	19.0 (66.2)	17.1 (62.8)	15.9 (60.6)	17.5 (63.5)	20.6 (69.1)	22.9 (73.2)	23.1 (73.6)	23.3 (73.9)	21.0 (69.8)
Average precipitation mm (inches)	292.3 (11.51)	218.8 (8.61)	193.8 (7.63)	67.8 (2.67)	3.6 (0.14)	4.3 (0.17)	1.1 (0.04)	3.7 (0.15)	32.7 (1.29)	111.7 (4.40)	221.6 (8.72)	266.3 (10.48)	1,417.7 (55.81)
Average precipitation days (≥ 1.0 mm)	18	15	15	5	1	0	0	1	4	8	13	17	97
Average relative humidity (%)	87.3	87.5	87.2	83.5	77.7	74.8	68.2	57.2	60.2	71.8	83.6	86.5	77.1
Mean monthly sunshine hours	153.1	149.7	186.0	244.2	270.7	273.8	288.7	299.7	213.5	188.8	160.5	139.6	2,568.3
Source: Instituto Nacional de Meteorologia

== Economy ==
Nova Xavantina is located in the Amazon-Cerrado transition region, one of the world's largest agricultural frontiers. Crop production, primarily soybeans and corn, and cattle ranching constitute the majority of land in the municipality and agriculture makes up the largest sector of the economy. Due primarily to agricultural expansion, the area has undergone a significant amount of deforestation since the 1980s.

Another economic driver in Nova Xavantina is tourism, primarily cerrado ecotourism. The city is famous for its many waterfalls, and for recreation on the Rio das Mortes, including swimming, boating, and fishing.

== Education ==
A campus of the State University of Mato Grosso (Unemat) is located in Nova Xavantina, offering undergraduate degrees in Agronomy, Biological Sciences, Civil Engineering, and Tourism, and a graduate degree in Ecology and Conservation.

== See also ==
- List of municipalities in Mato Grosso
