= Mato Grosso State University =

Public university in Brazil

- Universidade do Estado de Mato Grosso
- Motto: Universitate Omnium ("University for all")
- Type: Public
- Established: As Higher Learning Institution: 1978 As University: 1993
- Affiliations: Brazilian Association of State and Municipal Universities' Rectors (Abruem) National Network of Science Outreach (Renex) Rede Nacional de Extensão
- Rector: Ana Maria di Renzo
- Faculty: 1,342
- Undergraduates: 21,000
- Postgraduates: 2,000
- Location: Mato Grosso, Brazil
- Campus: 13 campuses: Cáceres, Alto Araguaia, Alta Floresta, Barra do Bugres, Colíder, Diamantino, Juara, Luciara, Nova Mutum, Nova Xavantina, Pontes e Lacerda, Sinop and Tangará da Serra
- Nickname: Unemat
- Website: http://portal.unemat.br/

The Mato Grosso State University (Portuguese: Universidade do Estado de Mato Grosso, Unemat) is a public university in the state of Mato Grosso, Brazil. It was created in 1978 and it is funded by the State Government of the Mato Grosso state. Its administrative headquarters is in the municipality of Cáceres, but it also has campuses in the municipalities of Alta Floresta, Alto Araguaia, Barra do Bugres, Colíder, Diamantino, Juara, Luciara, Nova Mutum, Nova Xavantina, Pontes e Lacerda, Sinop and Tangará da Serra.

== See also ==
- List of state universities in Brazil
