= Querência =

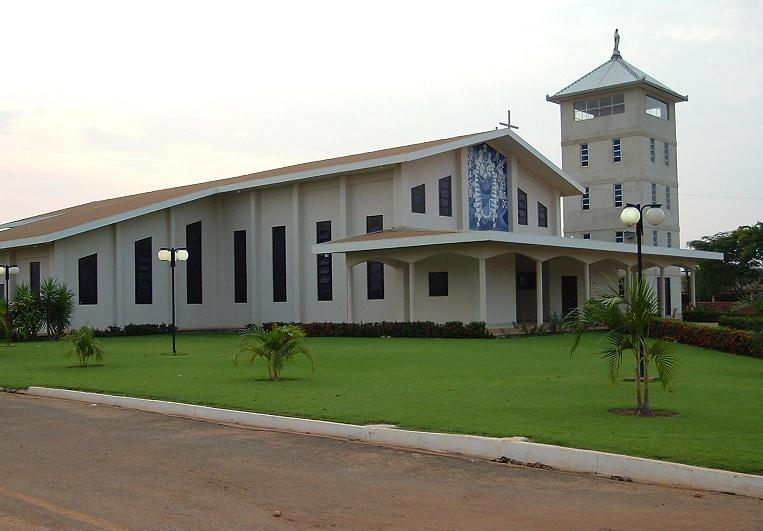
- Skyline of Querência

- Location of Querência
- Country: Brazil
- Region: Center-West
- State: Mato Grosso
- Founded: December 19, 1991

Government
  - Mayor: Fernando Görgen (PR)

Area
  - Total: 17,850 km^{2} (6,890 sq mi)
- Elevation: 0 m (0 ft)

Population (2020)
  - Total: 17,937
  - Density: 0.73/km^{2} (1.9/sq mi)
- Time zone: UTC-4 (UTC-4)
- Postal Code: 78643
- HDI (2000): 0,75 – alto

Querência is a Brazilian municipality of state of Mato Grosso. It is located in the northeast of the state, in the Great Amazon Basin. Within its great limits are part of the Xingu Indigenous Reserve, and an immense virgin area, formed by the Cerrado Mato-grossense, Amazon Forest and a large transition area. It is located at latitude 12º35'49 "south and at longitude 52º11'59" west, being at an altitude of 350 meters. It has an area of 17,850.249 km^{2}.

The official data of IBGE, based on the Census of 1996, registered 4,226 inhabitants in the municipality, and in 2000, 7,274. These figures, however, are out of date, as at the time of the census there were more than 500 people in a new settlement alone that could not be counted because they had been living in the municipality for less than six months. The number of enrollments in elementary schools increased 64% from 1999 to 2000, 32% from 2000 to 2001 and 26% from 2001 to the beginning of 2002. And in 2014, according to IBGE, the estimated population is 15,121 inhabitants. And in 2019, according to IBGE estimates, 17,479 inhabitants.

The name of Querência was chosen to mark the gaucho stamp of migration, as it is a typical name of southern estancias, linked to the cultural tradition of the first residents of the place, the gauchos.

== History ==
The origins of the municipality of Querência come from the Cooperativa Mista de Canarana, founded by Pastor Norberto Schwantes, who acquired 180 thousand hectares of Fazenda Betis, owned by the Peres Maldonado family.

The project was part of a colonization of the region between the municipalities of Barra do Garças and São Félix do Araguaia. It covered a vast region. The purpose of the cooperative was to improve the conditions of Rio Grande do Sul migrants and even to form a city.

The founding date, December 8, 1985. The following year, the first gaucho families arrived at the site of the future city. Although Querência's training had the logistical base of Canarana, the first days were improvisation and lack of material. The Amazon has always offered difficulties of all kinds, especially due to the climate, for those who venture into it.

The municipality was created on December 19, 1991, by Law No. 5,895.

Querência received status as a municipality under State Law No. 5895 of December 19, 1991, with territory separated from the municipalities of Canarana and São Félix do Araguaia.

== Economy ==
Querência's main source of income is in the agricultural activity. But, until recently, lumber extraction played a central role in the municipality's economy. With regard to agricultural activity, the culture of soy, corn and rice, and the creation of beef cattle deserve national prominence. According to the Rural Union of the municipality, Querência has approximately 300 thousand hectare arable crops and sets annual production records (in 2005-2006 the production growth was 16%). In 2006 it was responsible for the 24th largest agricultural production in the country, with 489,113 t, and the 14th largest soybean production, with 461,100 t. Large companies such as Cargill, Bunge, Caramuru, Amaggi, ADM, Agrex, among others, as well as the industry fertilizers Fertilizantes Tocantins, are installed in Querência and bet on the growing expansion of oilseed production. Livestock also has expressive numbers. It has approximately 200 thousand hectares in pastures and in 2008 it had 201,808 head of cattle.

IBGE data, referring to 2008, show that Querência's agricultural production in that year reached the following results: banana (150 tonnes), rubber / coagulated latex (2,954 tonnes), pineapple (700,000 fruits), rice (55,014 tonnes) ), sugar cane (1,500 tons), cassava (5,200 tons), corn (44,880 tons), soybeans (534,240 tons - 14th largest soybean production in Brazil), among others.

In 2017 Querência was the 3rd largest exporter in the state, US $792.41 million. In 2018, it is estimated that 400,000 hectares of soybeans will be planted, responsible for most of this amount.

Querência was the first municipality in Vale do Araguaia to reach the mark of R $1 billion in GDP in 2017, with R $1.24 billion, in addition to having the highest GDP per capita in eastern Mato Grosso.

== Administration ==
=== Mayors ===
- (1993 / 1996) Denir Perin (PMDB) - 1st Mayor
- (1997 / 2000) Hélio Vitorino Silva (PMDB)
- (2001 / 2004) Denir Perin (PMDB)
- (2005 / 2008) Fernando Görgen (PR)
- (2009 / 2012) Fernando Görgen (PR)
- (2013 / 2016) Gilmar Wentz (PMDB)
- (2017 / 2020) Fernando Görgen (PSB)

== Education ==
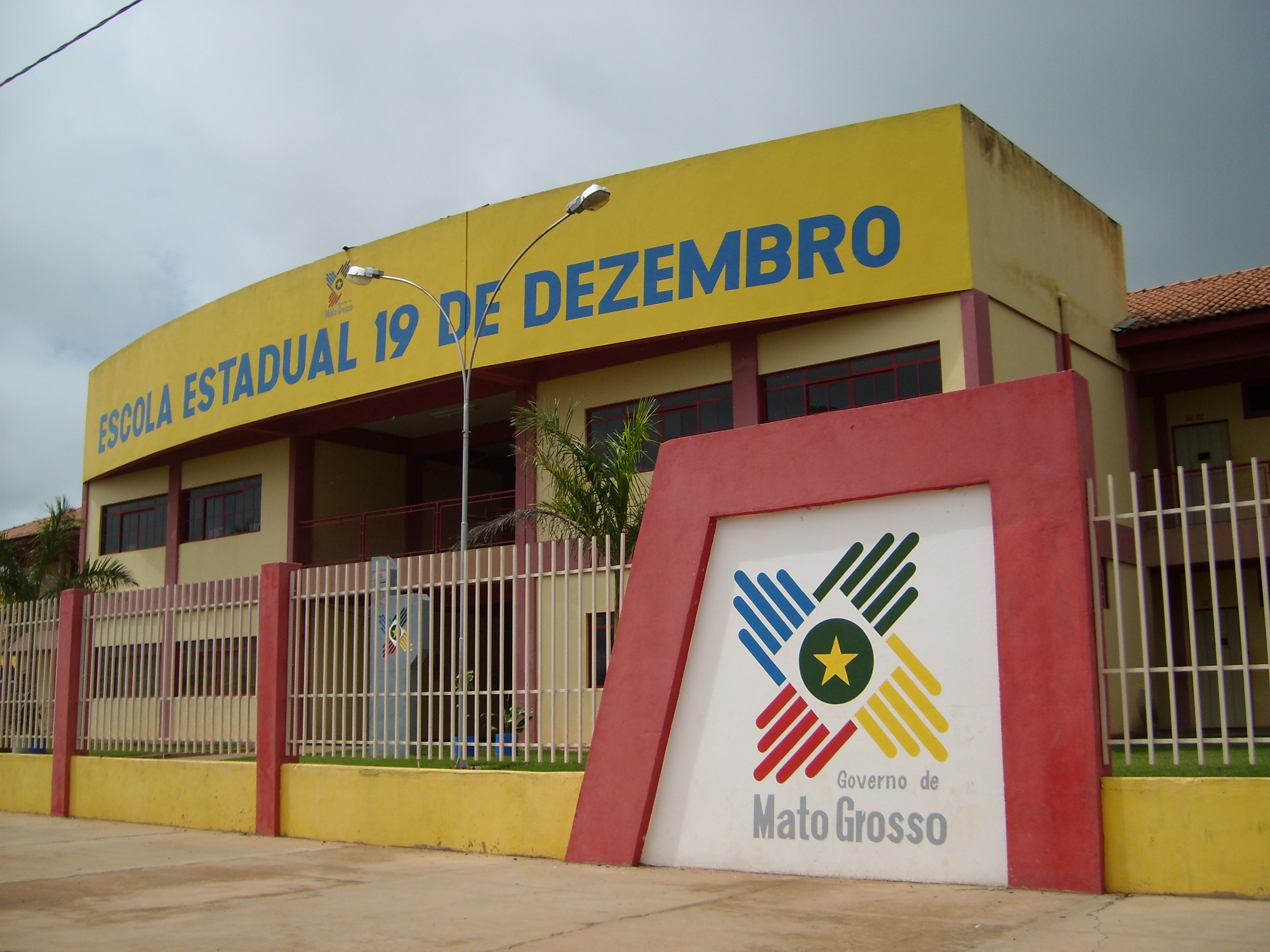
State School 19 de Dezembro.

The efforts of both teachers and competent authorities to offer quality education to students in Querencia has been successful. In the National High School Examination (ENEM) of 2007 the schools in the municipality of Querência obtained indexes above the national and state average, which made the city one of the state highlights in the exam.

Currently, the county seat has several educational institutions.

3 (three) state schools

- Querência State School
- State School of Basic Education December 19
- State School March 20

4 (four) municipal schools:

- Alegria do Saber Municipal School
- Querência Agricultural Family Municipal School
- Mundo Encantado Municipal School - (pre-school)
- Municipal School of Basic Education Lúcia Marcondes Machado Penido.

1 (one) municipal day care:

- Pequeno Príncipe Municipal Nursery

2 (two) private schools:

- CEFIQUE - Querência Integrated Training Center
- Colégio Provincia de São Pedro, with Education Children and 1st to 5th years of Elementary School.

In addition, Querentians have access to course extensions from:

- UNOPAR Northern University of Paraná

== Progress ==
The progress that the city of Querência has been experiencing in recent years is constant. The city is taken over by construction s beds (private and public). Among the public works, the project to beautify the streets and avenues (with their adequacy to drain the large volume of rainwater) stands out, the paving of the highway MT-243 which gives access to the city of Ribeirão Cascalheira and the conclusion of the project of interconnection of the municipality with the state electricity network (which made it possible to deactivate the old and noisy station thermoelectric of the city). Other projects in the planning and execution phase include adapting the Betis Stream to leisure (it will be transformed into a leisure center, with an artificial beach, summer houses, bars, etc.) and the construction of highway BR-242 (which will pass through the municipality and make the connection between the northwest and the northeast matogrossense). Querencia also received the conclusion of the BR-242 project linking BR-158, a Querencianos dream that became a reality in November 2010. This last project will certainly bring a strong boost to Querência's economic growth.

The municipality has 5 settlements: P.A. Pingo D'ÀGua, Coutinho União, Sao Manoel, Brasil Novo and Nova Esperança. The biggest one is Pingo D'àgua, with 549 lots.

== Leisure ==
=== Main parties ===
- 'Baile do Chopp' - It is a party of a German nature that seduces beer drinkers of all backgrounds. It takes place at the end of May, and always has bands from the south of the country.
- 'Festa do Settler and Driver' - In view of the agricultural vocation in Querência, this is perhaps the most traditional party in the municipality. It usually starts with a big parade of machines (trucks, tractor es, harvester s, among others) that runs through the city center. It takes place at the end of July.
- 'Song Festival' - Although it still doesn't have a great tradition, it has been winning fans every year. It is an event promoted by SEMEC (Municipal Department of Education and Culture) and takes place in July.
- 'EXPOQUER' - It is the biggest event on the Querentian calendar, as it concentrates shows of musicians (usually famous back country doubles), Exhibition of agricultural machines and Rodeo about bulls (that forms part of the circuit mato-grossense of rodeo). The first edition took place in 2006. It was held for four days in the month of August. It has been taking place for three years in June.

== Geography ==
=== Climate ===
It has a tropical climate. There is much more rainfall in the summer than in the winter. 25 °C is the average annual temperature. Average annual rainfall of 1696mm. It has two well-defined seasons: rainy summer from October to March and dry winter from May to September.

== Communications ==
FM Radio Broadcasters

Freq.	Name	-	87.9	Rádio Alternativa FM	-	97.9	Rádio Interativa FM

TV channel

Analog channel number	Broadcaster	Affiliation	-	12	Querência TV	RecordTV	-	15	TV Líder	SBT
