= Agua Boa =

Água Boa may refer to:

- Água Boa, Mato Grosso
  - Água Boa Airport
- Água Boa, Minas Gerais

== See also ==
- Água Boa do Univini River
