= VLP =

VLP may refer to:

- Virus-like particle, resemble viruses, but are non-infectious because they do not contain any viral genetic material
- Value Line Publishing, a financial publishing firm based in New York
- Vanuatu Labour Party, a political party in Vanuatu
- Victorian Liberal Party, an Australian political party from 1954–55
- Video Long Play, an original name of the LaserDisc format
- Vila Rica Municipal Airport (IATA code: VLP), in Vila Rica, Mato Grosso, Brazil
- Vile Parle railway station (Indian Railways station code: VLP), in Mumbai, Maharashtra, India
- Volunteer Lawyers Project, a Boston Bar Association project, provides pro bono civil legal assistance to low-income clients
- VLP TV, a regional Chilean TV channel
- Vive La Peinture, a French urban art group, see Figuration Libre
