= Adriano Silva =

Adriano Silva may refer to:

- Adriano Silva (Brazilian politician, born 1970) (1970–2020)
- Adriano Silva (Brazilian politician, born 1978), mayor of Joinville
