= Iquê Ecological Station =

Protected area in Mato Grosso, Brazil

- Estação Ecológica do Iquê
- IUCN category Ia (strict nature reserve)
- Location within Brazil
- Nearest city: Vilhena, Rondônia
- Coordinates: 11.955°S 59.257°W
- Area: 215,969 hectares (533,670 acres)
- Designation: Ecological station
- Created: 2 June 1981

Iquê Ecological Station (Portuguese: Estação Ecológica do Iquê) is an ecological station in the Juína municipality of Mato Grosso, Brazil.

== Location ==
The 215,969 hectares (533,670 acres) Ecological Station is in the Cerrado biome. It was created on 2 June 1981 and is administered by the Chico Mendes Institute for Biodiversity Conservation. A reduction of 56,000 hectares (140,000 acres) from the initial area was made by agreement with the Fundação Nacional do Índio in view of the indigenous area of the Enauenê-Nauê people. The conservation unit is in the Juína municipality of Mato Grosso. It would be in the proposed South Amazon Ecotones Ecological Corridor.

== Conservation ==
The Ecological Station is a "strict nature reserve" under IUCN protected area category Ia. It was established to protect a sample of the ecosystem of the transition from the Amazon to the Cerrado. The climate is warm and humid, with average temperatures above 28 °C (82 °F). Annual rainfall is about 2,300 millimetres (91 in). The terrain is relatively flat. The ecology is under threat from diamond prospecting, which causes deforestation and pollution of the rivers.

== Sources ==
- Ayres, José Márcio; Da Fonseca, Gustavo A. B.; Rylands, Anthony B.; Queiroz, Helder L.; Pinto, Luiz Paulo; Masterson, Donald; Cavalcanti, Roberto B. (2005), Os Corredores Ecológicos das Florestas Tropicais do Brasil (PDF) (in Portuguese), Sociedade Civil Mamirauá, archived from the original (PDF) on 2016-07-31
- Estação Ecológica do Iquê, Ambiente Brasil
- Estação Ecológica de Iquê (in Portuguese), CMIBC, archived from the original on 2016-08-09
- Unidade de Conservação: Estação Ecológica do Iquê (in Portuguese), MMA: Ministério do Meio Ambiente
