= Adriano Silva (Brazilian politician, born 1970) =

Brazilian politician (1970–2020)

Member of the Legislative Assembly of Mato Grosso
- In office 4 January 2016 – 29 February 2016
- In office 6 July 2016 – 2 August 2016

Rector of the Mato Grosso State University
- In office 2010–2014
- Preceded by: Taisir Karin
- Succeeded by: Dionei Silva

Personal details
- Born: October 12, 1970 Cáceres, Mato Grosso, Brazil
- Died: June 3, 2020 (aged 49) Cuiabá, Mato Grosso, Brazil
- Party: Democrats (DEM)
- Other political affiliations: PSB (former); PP (former)
- Children: 2
- Profession: Politician, professor

Adriano Aparecido Silva (12 October 1970 – 3 June 2020), better known as simply Adriano Silva, was a Brazilian politician and professor from the state of Mato Grosso.

== Career ==
Before pursuing a career in politics, Silva worked as a professor and also held the post of Rector of the Mato Grosso State University between 2010 and 2014.

In 2014, he decided to run for a spot at the Legislative Assembly of Mato Grosso. Although he failed to be directly elected for the position, he was appointed suplente, a substitute Deputy that only takes office if a permanent or temporary vacancy within this coalition occurs.

On 4 January 2016, Silva took office as a Member of the Legislative Assembly of Mato Grosso due to a temporary vacancy. He remained in power for little less than two months and left the post on February 29, 2016.

On 6 July 2016, Silva took office as a State Deputy for the second time, once again due to a temporary vacancy. This time he remained less than one month in power and left office on August 2, 2016.

In 2016, Silva decided to run at the mayoral elections of his birth city of Cáceres. The attempt was unsuccessful as he failed to secure enough votes to win.

In 2018, Silva decided to run for a spot at the Chamber of Deputies, representing his birth state of Mato Grosso. The attempt was unsuccessful as he failed to secure enough votes for election, but once again he was appointed a suplente.

== Personal life and death ==
At the time of his death, Silva was married and had two sons.

On 3 June 2020, Silva died from complications brought on by COVID-19 in Cuiabá during the COVID-19 pandemic in Brazil.
