= Serra Azul State Park =

State park in Mato Grosso, Brazil

- Parque Estadual da Serra Azul
- IUCN category II (national park)
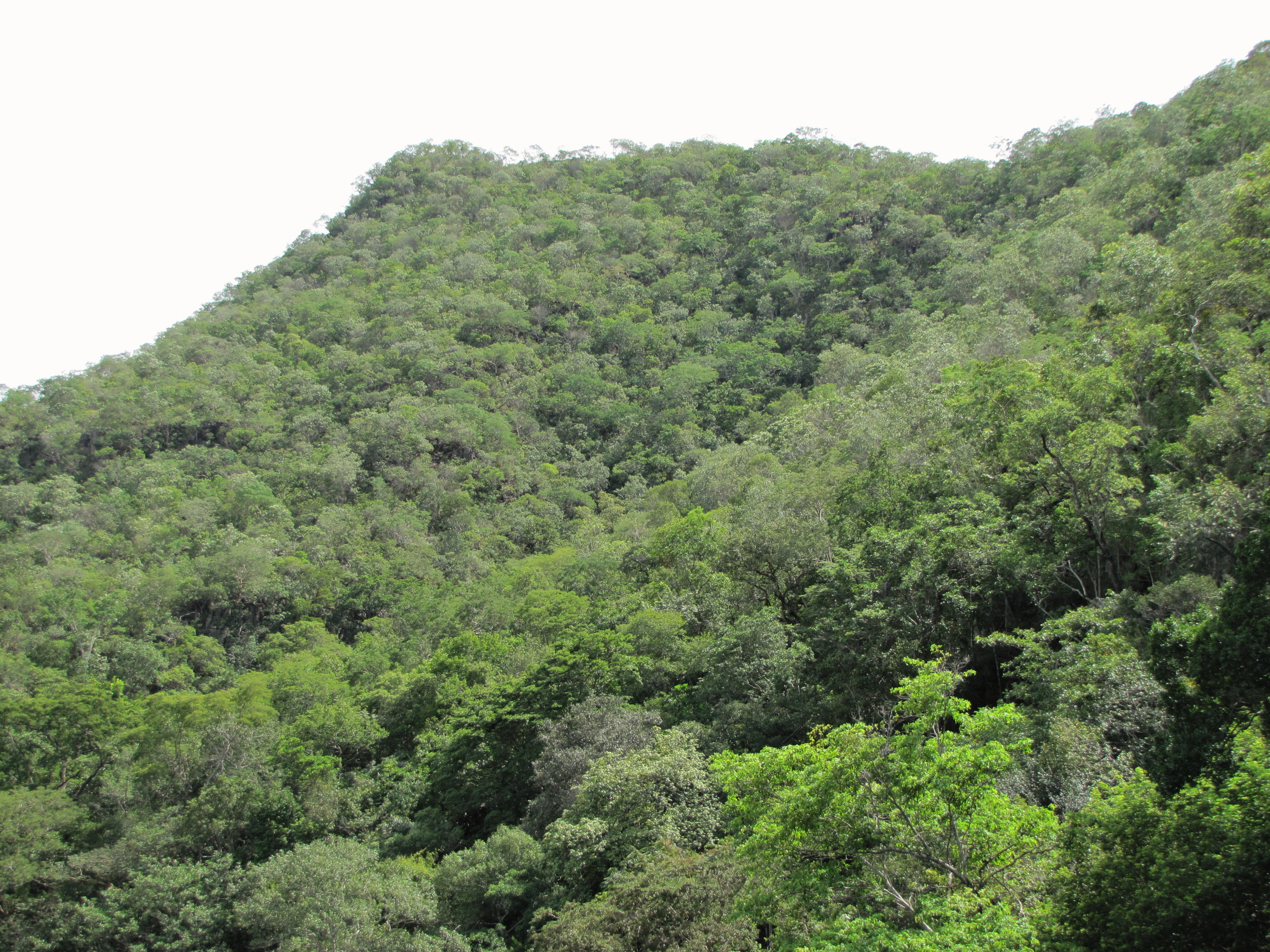
- Vegetation in the park

- Location within Brazil
- Nearest city: Barra do Garças, Mato Grosso
- Coordinates: 15.821°S 52.216°W
- Area: 11,002.4 hectares (27,188 acres)
- Designation: State park
- Created: 31 May 1994
- Administrator: Secretaria de Estado de Meio Ambiente

The Serra Azul State Park (Portuguese: Parque Estadual da Serra Azul) is a state park in the state of Mato Grosso, Brazil. It protects a mountainous area of cerrado forest and contains slopes that are used for paragliding. The park contains the geodetic center of Brazil.

== Location ==
The Serra Azul State Park is in the municipality of Barra do Garças in the east of Mato Grosso. It has an area of 11,002.4 hectares (27,188 acres). The park contains a landmark for the geodetic center of Brazil.

The park is in the Guimarães plateau, bounded to the north by the Paranatinga depression, to the east by the Araguaia depression and to the northeast by the Parecis plateau. Altitudes range from 350 metres (1,150 ft) at the park entrance to 730 metres (2,400 ft) at the highest points. The terrain is rugged, including flatter areas and steep escarpments with slopes of more than 45º. The park is on the bank of the Araguaia River, and is in the Araguaia-Tocantins basin. The mountains give rise to many streams that feed the Araguaia River or the Rio das Mortes.

== History ==
The Serra Azul State Park was created by state law 6.539 of 31 May 1994. It is administered by the Secretary of State for the Environment (Sema). On 10 August 2015 governor Pedro Taques signed an agreement with the municipality of Barra do Garças for investment in the park's infrastructure and improved staffing.

A fire burned 80% of the vegetation in August–September 2014 and the park was closed. It reopened for paragliding by members of the Free Flying Association in December 2015. Schools and universities were also allowed monitored access to the park subject to advanced authorization. SEMA said in 2015 they planned to gradually open new areas for visitors, who average 2,500 per month, to allow better security and conservation of local biodiversity.

== Environment ==
Soils are mainly litholic, from sandstone formations, but flat areas have yellow latosol. The Köppen climate classification is Aw, with two well-defined seasons. The dry season is from April to September, and the rainy season from October to March. Fires sometimes break out in the dry season. There were fires in 2002, 2005, 2007, and 2012. The fire in 2007 affected 80% of the park. There are small roads around some areas, remains of old farm roads from before the land was expropriated, which serve as firebreaks.

The park is in the cerrado biome. Vegetation includes gallery forests, semi-deciduous forests, typical cerrado and rocky cerrado. About 800 species of vascular plants have been identified, and 180 species of birds, but the flora and fauna had not been subject to thorough inventories as of 2015. The Astyanax xavante is a fish that is endemic to the Córrego Avoadeira, the largest stream in the park. The Bororó people, who used to live in the area, called the park Kieguereiral ("Place of Birds") due to the great diversity of birds.

== Activities ==
The park is an excellent location for paragliding. Other attractions include Christ's staircase, the gazebo and trails that lead to 15 waterfalls with an average height of 15 to 25 metres (49 to 82 ft). The Pezinhos Cave contains prehistoric paintings of great anthropological value. The cave was deteriorating due to people touching the paintings and writing on the walls. As of 2015 the cave was closed to visitors until a method of sustainable visitation could be arranged.

== Sources ==
- Domingues, Rose (3 December 2015), Sema reabre dois atrativos do Parque Estadual Serra Azul (in Portuguese), State of Mato Grosso
- Parque Estadual da Serra Azul (in Portuguese), Barra do Garças
- "Parque Estadual Serra Azul é liberado para a prática de parapente", G1 Globo (in Portuguese), 4 December 2015
- Pedroni, Fernando; Sanchez, Maryland (2015), Parque Estadual Da Serra Azul – PESA (PDF) (in Portuguese), ICBS – Campus Universitário do Araguaia – UFMT, archived from the original (PDF) on 2016-12-20
