= Pontes e Lacerda Airport =

Airport serving Pontes e Lacerda, Brazil

André Antônio Maggi Airport Aeroporto André Antônio Maggi
- IATA: LCB; ICAO: SWBG; LID: MT0009

Summary
- Airport type: Public
- Serves: Pontes e Lacerda
- Time zone: BRT−1 (UTC−04:00)
- Elevation AMSL: 247 m (810 ft)
- Coordinates: 15°11′36″S 059°23′07″W

Map
- Location in Brazil

Runways
| Direction | Length | | Surface |
| Direction | m | ft | Surface |
|---|---|---|---|
| 01/19 | 1,500 | 4,921 | Asphalt |
- Sources: ANAC, DECEA

André Antônio Maggi Airport (IATA: LCB, ICAO: SWBG), is the airport serving Pontes e Lacerda, Brazil.

== Access ==
The airport is located 8 km (5 mi) from downtown Pontes e Lacerda.

== See also ==
- List of airports in Brazil
