= Juruena Airport =

Juruena Airport Aeroporto de Juruena
- IATA: JRN; ICAO: SWJU

Summary
- Airport type: Public
- Serves: Juruena
- Closed: 2016 (temporarily)
- Time zone: BRT−1 (UTC−04:00)
- Elevation AMSL: 160 m (520 ft)
- Coordinates: 10°18′21″S 058°29′22″W

Map
- Location in Brazil

Runways
Direction	Length		Surface
Direction	m	ft	Surface
14/32	1,640	5,381	Asphalt
- Source: ANAC

Juruena Airport (IATA: JRN, ICAO: SWJU) is the airport serving Juruena, Brazil. It was closed in 2016.

== History ==
On August 8, 2016 the operational license of the facility was revoked.

== Access ==
The airport is located 6 km (4 mi) from downtown Juruena.

== See also ==
- List of airports in Brazil
