= Confresa Airport =

Airport in Brazil

Confresa Airport Aeroporto de Confresa
- IATA: CFO; ICAO: SJHG; LID: MT0176

Summary
- Airport type: Private
- Owner/Operator: Frenova
- Serves: Confresa
- Time zone: BRT−1 (UTC−04:00)
- Elevation AMSL: 238 m (781 ft)
- Coordinates: 10°38′01″S 051°34′02″W

Map
- Location in Brazil

Runways
Direction	Length		Surface
Direction	m	ft	Surface
12/30	1,100	3,609	Gravel
- Source: ANAC, DECEA

Confresa Airport (IATA: CFO, ICAO: SJHG) formerly SWKF, is the airport serving Confresa, Brazil.

Though privately owned and operated by Frenova Agropecuária Ltda, the facility is open for public use.

== History ==
The airport was commissioned in 2005.

== Access ==
The airport is located 3 km (2 mi) from downtown Confresa.

== See also ==
- List of airports in Brazil
