= Confresa =

Coordinates: 10.6439°S 51.5689°W

- Municipality
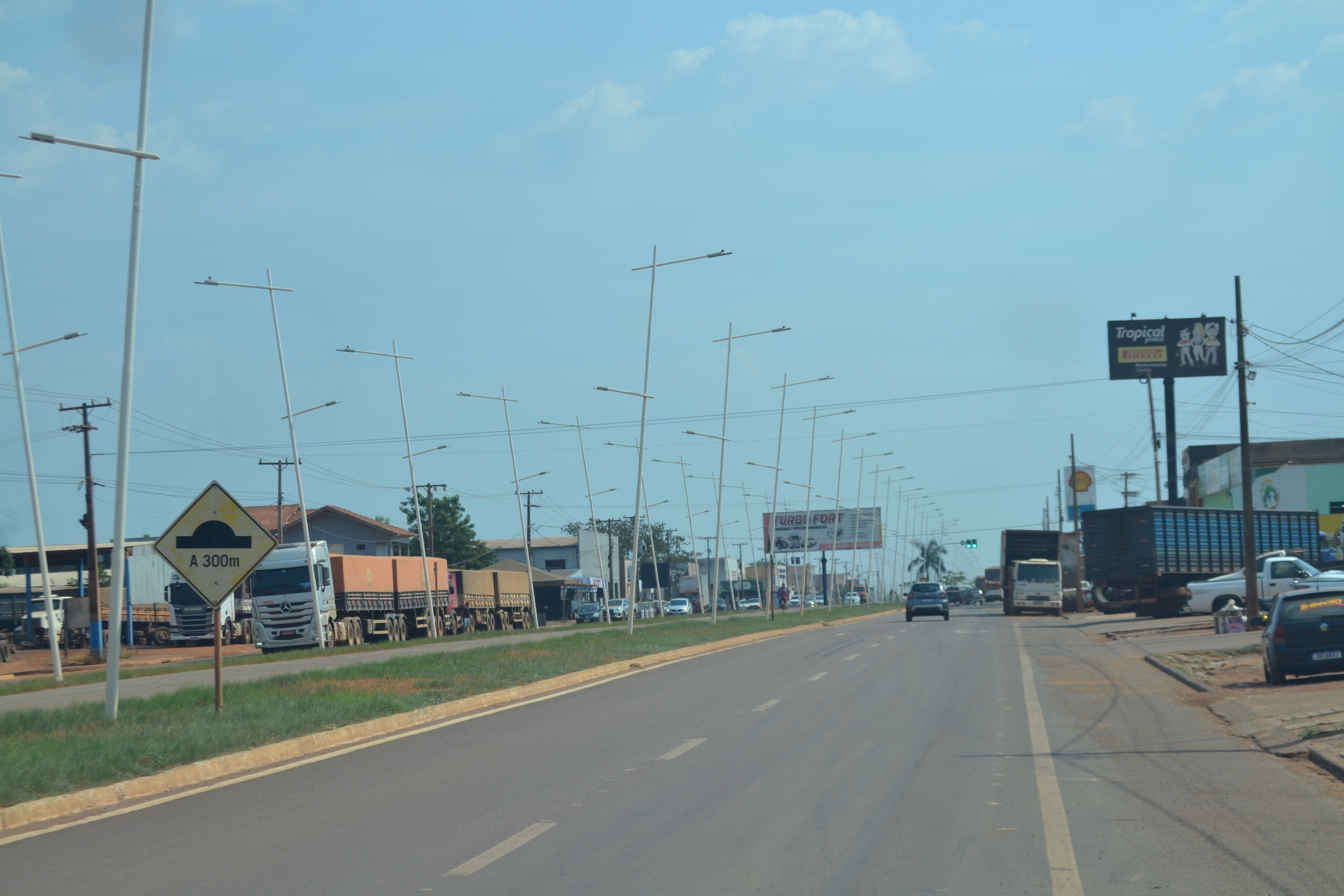

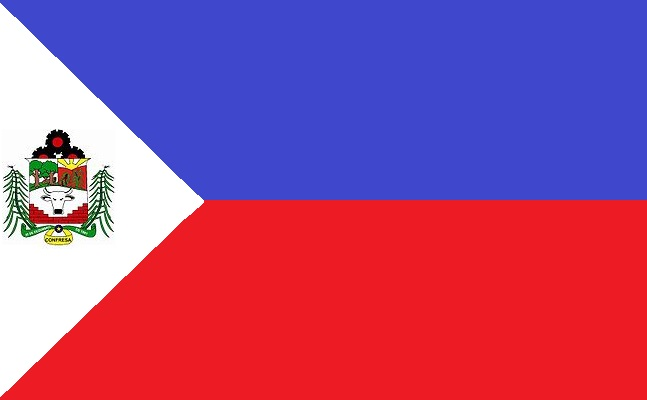
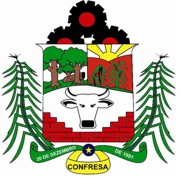
- Flag Coat of arms

- Country: Brazil
- Region: Center-West
- State: Mato Grosso
- Mesoregion: Nordeste Mato-Grossense

Population (2020)
  - Total: 31,510
- Time zone: UTC−3 (BRT)

Confresa is a municipality in the state of Mato Grosso in the Central-West Region of Brazil.

The city is served by Confresa Airport.

== History ==
The first settlement that led to the formation of the municipality of Confresa was called Vila Tapiraguaia, a fusion of the terms Tapirapé and Araguaia. This was a geographic reference to the Tapirapé and Araguaia Rivers, tributaries forming the Tocantins Basin. The term Confresa refers to the Colonizadora Frenova Sapeva. This company owned the Fazendas Reunidas Nova Amazônia, which included numerous agricultural properties and a distillery. The company is now called Frenova Agropecuária Ltda.

Confresa was established as a district of Santa Terezinha on April 17, 1990. It was elevated to municipality status on December 20, 1991, also incorporating small areas from Luciara and Porto Alegre do Norte. The district headquarters was established on January 1, 1993, and on March 19, 1997, the district of Veranópolis was created. Confresa also includes the following agricultural villages: Jacaré, Valente, Três Flechas, Buriti, Novo Planalto, Pé de Caju, Lumiar, Vila Goiás, Bridão Brasileiro, Santa Marta, Pé de Galinha, and Postinho.

== See also ==
- List of municipalities in Mato Grosso
