= Alta Floresta Airport =

Airport in Brazil

Piloto Osvaldo Marques Dias Airport Aeroporto Piloto Osvaldo Marques Dias
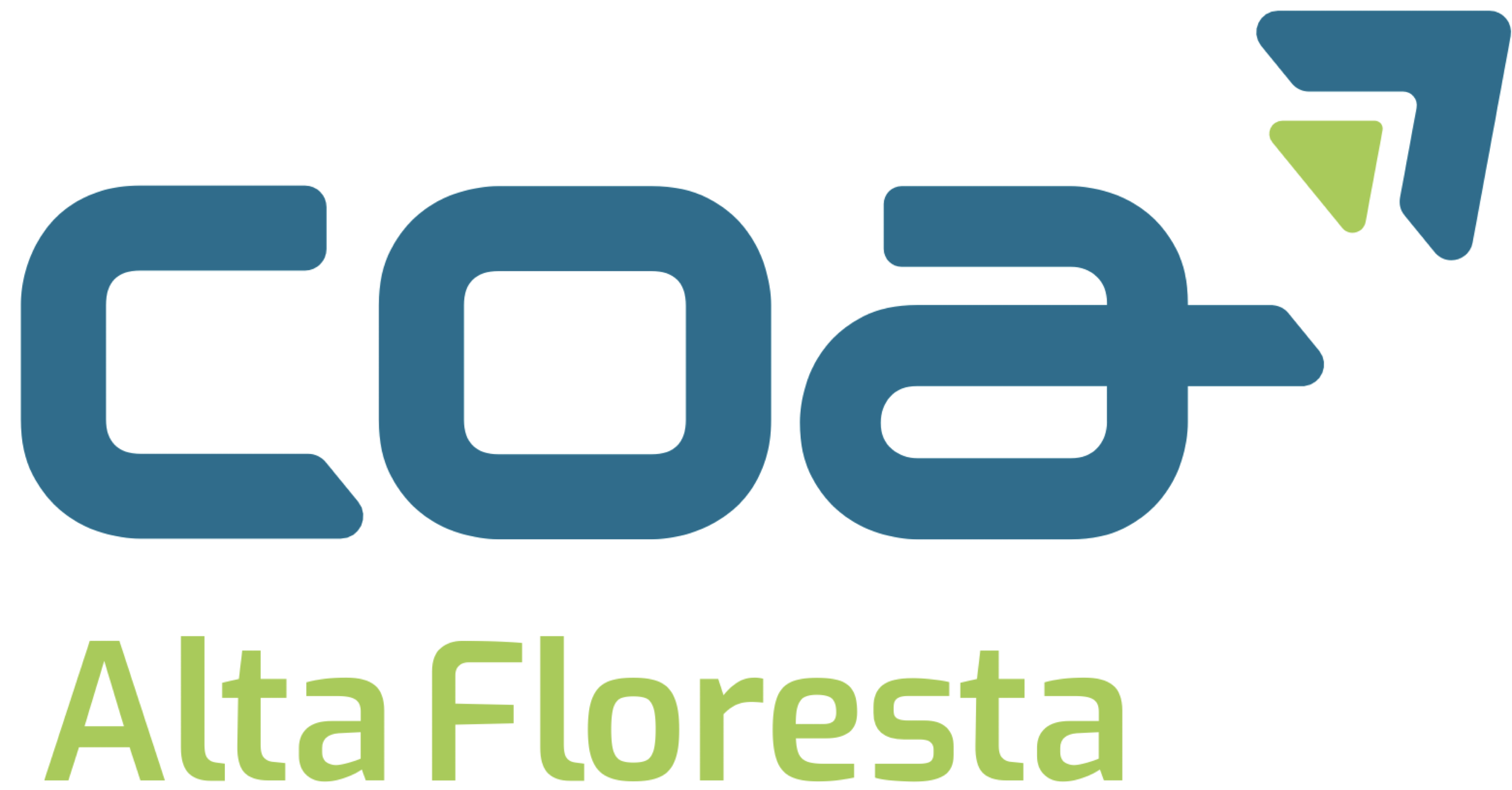
- IATA: AFL; ICAO: SBAT; LID: MT0003

Summary
- Airport type: Public
- Operator: Aeroeste (2019–present)
- Serves: Alta Floresta
- Time zone: BRT−1 (UTC−04:00)
- Elevation AMSL: 289 m (948 ft)
- Coordinates: 09°51′59″S 056°06′18″W
- Website: centroeste-airports.com.br#coa-alta-floresta

Map
- Location in Brazil

Runways
Direction	Length		Surface
Direction	m	ft	Surface
04/22	2,500	8,202	Asphalt

Statistics (2023)
- Passengers: 57,901 ▼4%
- Aircraft Operations: 2,850 ▼3%
- Statistics: Centro-Oeste Airports; Sources: Airport Website, ANAC, DECEA

Piloto Osvaldo Marques Dias Airport (IATA: AFL, ICAO: SBAT) is the airport serving Alta Floresta, Brazil.

It is operated by Aeroeste.

== History ==
On March 15, 2019 Aeroeste won a 30-year concession to operate the airport.

== Airlines and destinations ==
Airlines	Destinations
Azul Brazilian Airlines	Campinas, Cuiabá

== Access ==
The airport is located 6 km (4 mi) from downtown Alta Floresta.

== See also ==
- List of airports in Brazil
