= Canarana Airport =

Airport in Brazil

Canarana Airport Aeroporto de Canarana
- IATA: CQA; ICAO: SWEK; LID: MT0024

Summary
- Airport type: Public
- Serves: Canarana
- Time zone: BRT−1 (UTC−04:00)
- Elevation AMSL: 398 m (1,306 ft)
- Coordinates: 13°34′39″S 052°16′05″W

Map
- Location in Brazil

Runways
Direction	Length		Surface
Direction	m	ft	Surface
18/36	1,400x18	4,593 × 59	Asphalt
- Sources: ANAC, DECEA

Canarana Airport (IATA: CQA, ICAO: SWEK) is the airport serving Canarana, Brazil.

== Access ==
The airport is located 2 km (1 mi) from downtown Canarana.

== See also ==
- List of airports in Brazil
