= Vila Rica Airport =

Vila Rica Airport Aeroporto de Vila Rica
- IATA: VLP; ICAO: SWVC; LID: MT0016

Summary
- Airport type: Public
- Serves: Vila Rica
- Time zone: BRT−1 (UTC−04:00)
- Elevation AMSL: 254 m (833 ft)
- Coordinates: 09°58′52″S 051°08′26″W

Map
- Location in Brazil

Runways
| Direction | Length | | Surface |
| Direction | m | ft | Surface |
|---|---|---|---|
| 07/25 | 1,350 | 4,429 | Dirt |
- Sources: ANAC, DECEA

Vila Rica Airport (IATA: VLP, ICAO: SWVC), is the airport serving Vila Rica, Brazil.

== Access ==
The airport is located 4 km (2 mi) from downtown Vila Rica.

== See also ==
- List of airports in Brazil
