= Juruena =

Coordinates: 12°51′S 58°56′W

- Municipality
- Country: Brazil
- Region: Center-West
- State: Mato Grosso
- Mesoregion: Norte Mato-Grossense

Population (2020)
  - Total: 16,335
- Time zone: UTC−3 (BRT)

Juruena is a municipality in the state of Mato Grosso in the Central-West Region of Brazil.

The city is served by Juruena Airport.

== See also ==
- List of municipalities in Mato Grosso
- Sepotuba River
