= Várzea Grande, Mato Grosso =

Várzea Grande
- Municipality
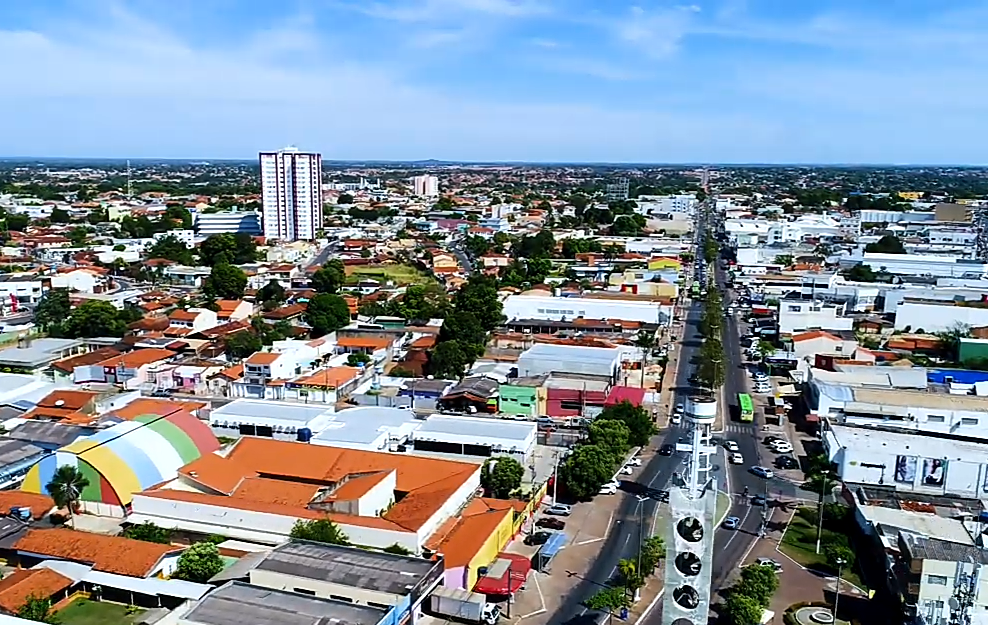
- view of Várzea Grande

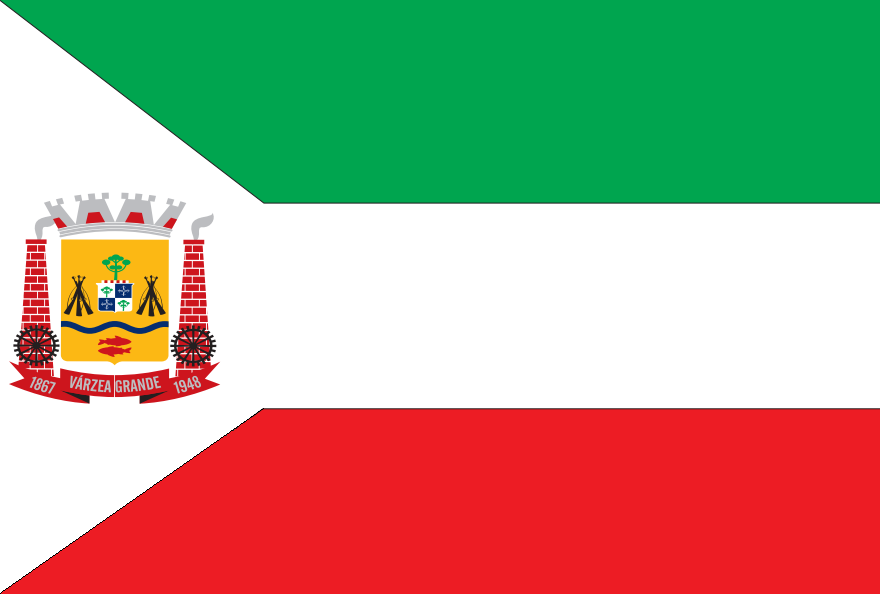
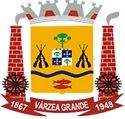
- Flag Coat of arms

- Within Mato Grosso

- Location in Brazil
- Coordinates: 15°38′49″S 56°07′58″W
- Country: Brazil
- Region: Center-West
- State: Mato Grosso
- Mesoregion: Centro-Sul Mato-Grossense
- Established: May 15, 1867

Government
  - Mayor: Flavia Petersen Moretti de Araújo (Democrats)
  - Demonym: varzeagrandense

Area
  - Total: 938.057 km^{2} (362.186 sq mi)
- Elevation: 198 m (650 ft)

Population (2022)
  - Total: 300,078
  - Density: 319.893/km^{2} (828.519/sq mi)
- Time zone: UTC -4

Várzea Grande is a municipality in the state of Mato Grosso in the Central-West Region of Brazil.

== History ==
The "City of the Great Lowlands" arose from a donation of land grants given to the Guaná people in 1832, considered civilized by the Portuguese and known for their skills as boatmen and fishermen, by the imperial government. The city, whose name roughly translates into English as "Great Lowlands of the Guana", was a mandatory stop along the way for the herds of cattle that came from Upper Rio Rosario (now Rosario West ) that were en route to Cuiabá.

Its foundation is closely linked to the military camp - Camp Couto Magalhães - built during the Paraguayan War, near the current center of town. However, this military camp, which gave support to the state capital during the war, which was established on May 15, 1867, by general, lawyer, and diamond mining town founder, José Vieira Couto de Magalhães, was located on the left shore of the Cuiabá River, or on the other side of the river from the city of Cuiabá, near the mouth of the Rio Coxipó, the northern capital.

== Economy ==
Várzea Grande is predominantly commercial and industrial, and subsistence agriculture. Through tax incentives and land grants, industries settled in the region, constituting, together with the capital, the main industrial center of the state.

== Geography ==
Várzea Grande bordering the municipalities of Cuiabá, Santo Antônio de Leverger, Our Lady of Deliverance, Acorizal and Raft. The city formerly belonged to the municipality of Cuiabá, but was later separated; with the Cuiabá River forming the boundary between the two municipalities.

The savanna dominates the region with the densest forest on riversides and wetlands are already seeing a trend of transition to the Pantanal. Varzea Grande is located more than 180m sea level.

=== Climate ===
Várzea Grande and Cuiabá have a tropical hot and humid climate. The temperature range varies from 17 °C to 32 °C in winter, in recent times has been very strict temperature lowered to 10 °C in July with windchill 4.9 °C. The summer is very hot with temperatures ranging from 23 C to 40 °C. Várzea Grande and Cuiabá have hot nights with temperatures that can reach 32 °C, and drop to around 24 °C.

== Demographics ==
According to data from demographic census carried out by IBGE in 2010, the population of Várzea Grande is concentrated almost entirely in the urban area. Nothing more than 248,829 people - 98.46% of the total population - live in urban areas, with only 3880 inhabitants (1.54%) in rural areas.

Most of the population of 252,709 inhabitants are women, 127,351 are women (50.39%) against 125,358 men (49.61%).

As its population recorded in 2000 was 215,298 inhabitants, Várzea Grande grew 17.37% in ten years - or 1.73% per year - with an absolute growth of 37,411 people in that period.

== Transportation ==
Public transportation is done by buses, collective taxis and motorcycle taxi, integrated with Cuiabá.

According to the Traffic Department of the MT, the fleet of Cuiabá and Várzea Grande consists of a total of 292,219 vehicles (215,174 and 77,045 respectively), while 152,366 are cars (117,310 and 35,056 respectively) are 77,024 motorcycles / scooters (51,699 and 25,325 respectively) (RENAEST est. 2008).

Marechal Rondon International Airport, which also serves Cuiabá is located at Várzea Grande.

== Infrastructure ==
Education

- Centro Universitário de Várzea Grande

== See also ==
- List of municipalities in Mato Grosso
