= São Félix do Araguaia Airport =

São Félix do Araguaia Airport Aeroporto de São Félix do Araguaia
- IATA: SXO; ICAO: SWFX; LID: MT0022

Summary
- Airport type: Public
- Serves: São Félix do Araguaia
- Time zone: BRT−1 (UTC−04:00)
- Elevation AMSL: 199 m (653 ft)
- Coordinates: 11°37′57″S 050°41′22″W

Map
- Location in Brazil

Runways
Direction	Length		Surface
Direction	m	ft	Surface
12/30	1,450	3,609	Asphalt
- Sources: ANAC, DECEA

São Félix do Araguaia Airport (IATA: SXO, ICAO: SWFX) is the airport serving São Félix do Araguaia, Brazil.

== Access ==
The airport is located 3 km (2 mi) from downtown São Félix do Araguaia.

== See also ==
- List of airports in Brazil
