= Marechal Rondon International Airport =

Várzea Grande–Marechal Rondon International Airport Aeroporto Internacional de Várzea Grande–Marechal Rondon
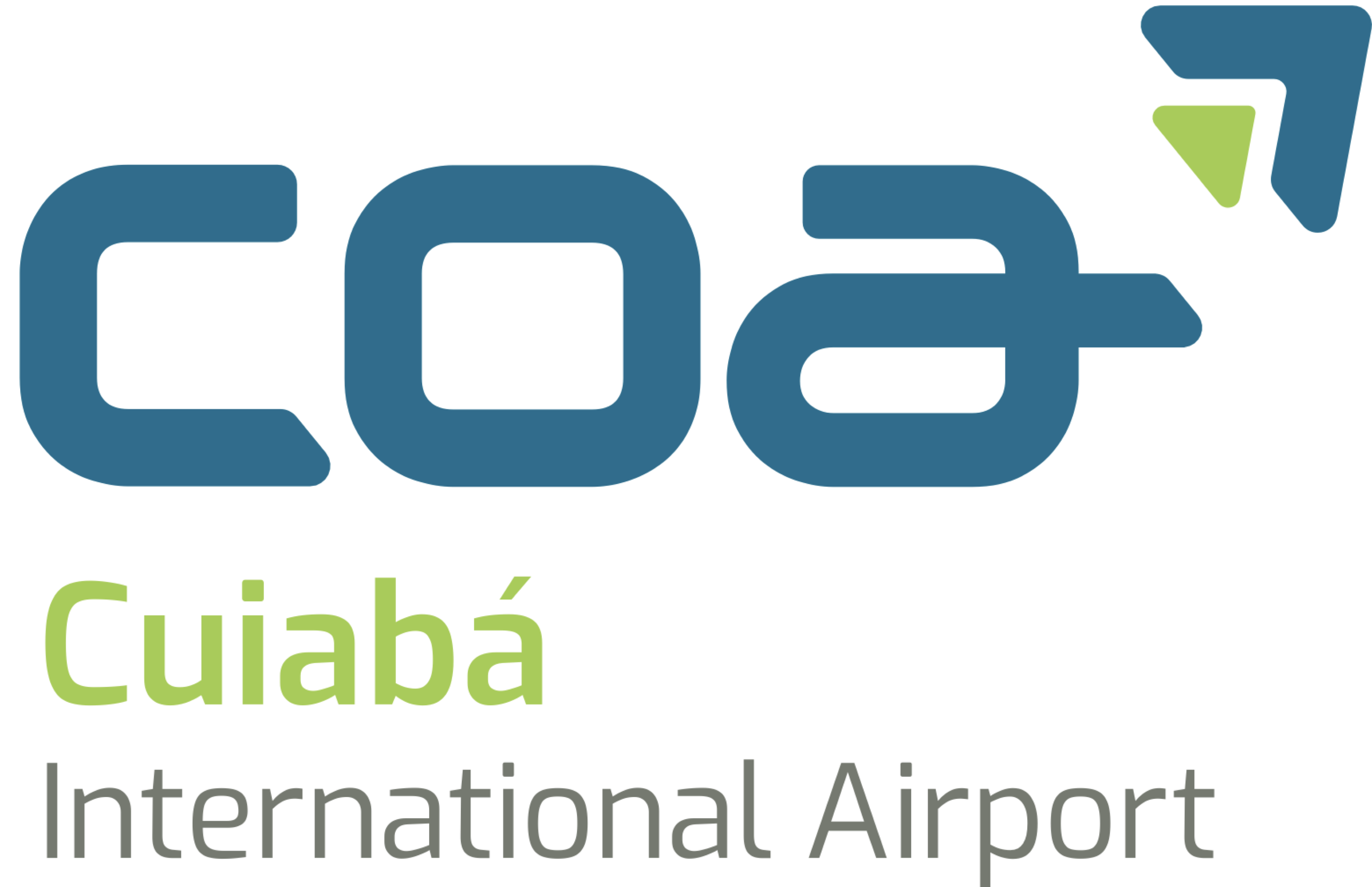

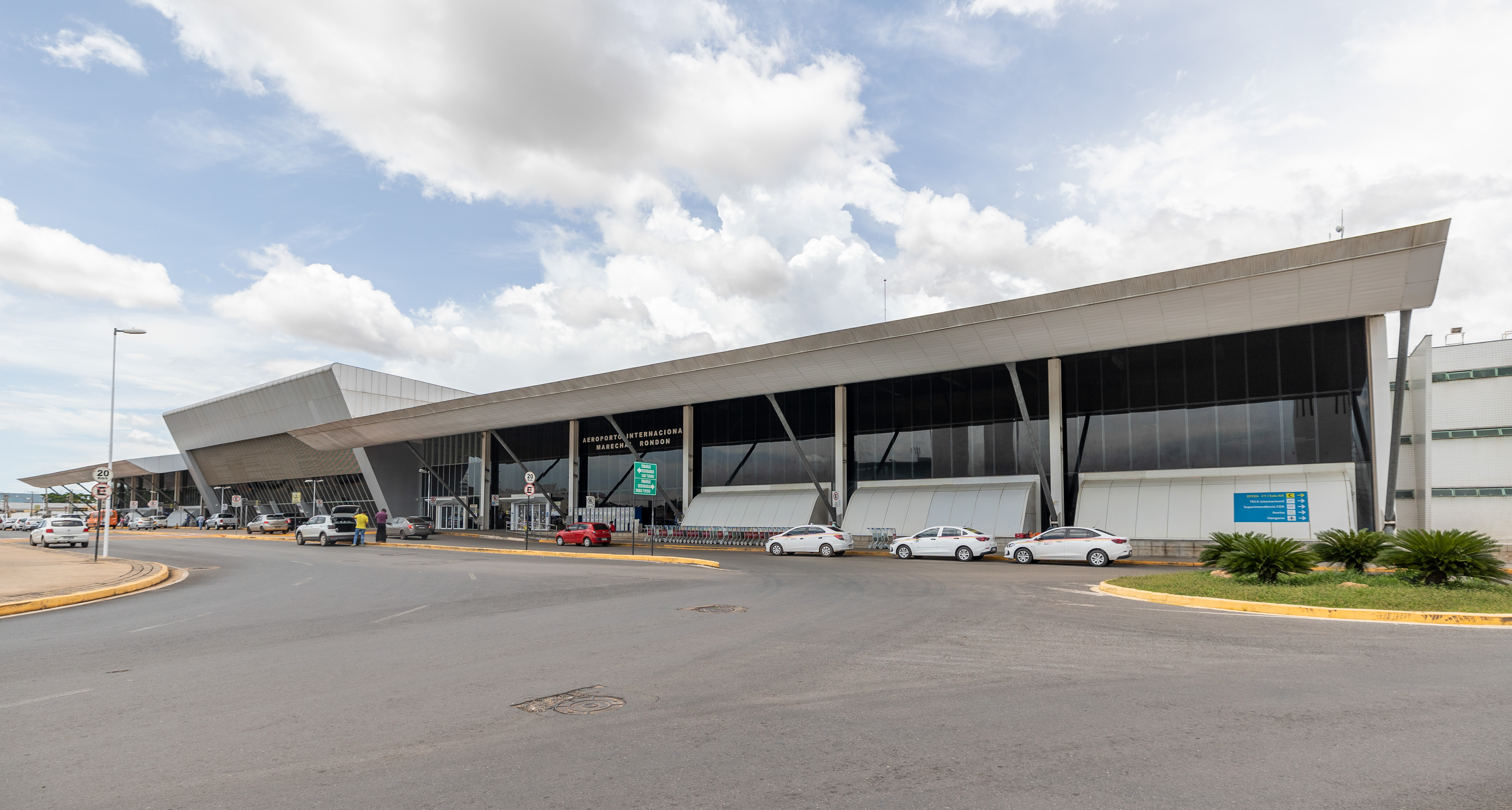
- IATA: CGB; ICAO: SBCY; LID: MT0001

Summary
- Airport type: Public
- Operator: Infraero (1974–2019); Aeroeste (2019–present)
- Serves: Cuiabá
- Location: Várzea Grande, Brazil
- Opened: 1956
- Focus city for: Azul Brazilian Airlines
- Time zone: BRT−1 (UTC−04:00)
- Elevation AMSL: 188 m (617 ft)
- Coordinates: 15°39′00″S 056°07′03″W
- Website: centroeste-airports.com.br/aeroporto-de-cuiaba/

Map
- Location in Brazil

Runways
Direction	Length		Surface
Direction	m	ft	Surface
17/35	2,300	7,546	Asphalt

Statistics (2024)
- Passengers: 2,721,055 ▼5%
- Aircraft Operations: 46,430
- Statistics: Centro-Oeste Airports; Sources: Airport Website, ANAC, DECEA

Várzea Grande–Marechal Rondon International Airport (IATA: CGB, ICAO: SBCY) is the airport serving Cuiabá, located in the municipality of Várzea Grande, in the state of Mato Grosso. It is named after Marshall Cândido Mariano da Silva Rondon (1865–1958), a Brazilian explorer.

It is operated by Aeroeste.

== History ==
Marechal Rondon International Airport was inaugurated in 1956 but operated precariously until the first passenger terminal building was completed in 1964.

Infraero became the operator of the airport in 1974, and in 1996 it was upgraded to international status.

The first phase of the construction of the new passenger terminal was completed on 30 June 2006. The second phase would involve the demolition of the old terminal building and the construction of the enlargement of the new passenger terminal on its place.

On 31 August 2009, Infraero unveiled a BRL30.9 million (US$16.3 million; EUR11.4 million) investment plan to up-grade Marechal Rondon International Airport focusing on the preparations for the 2014 FIFA World Cup which was held in Brazil, Cuiabá being one of the venue cities. The investment was distributed in the renovation of the passenger terminal, parking and access to the airport.

Responding to critiques to the situation of its airports, on 18 May 2011, Infraero released a list evaluating some of its most important airports according to their saturation levels. According to the list, Cuiabá was considered to be critically saturated, operating above 85% of its capacity.

On 15 March 2019, Aeroeste won a 30-year concession to operate the airport.

== Airlines and destinations ==
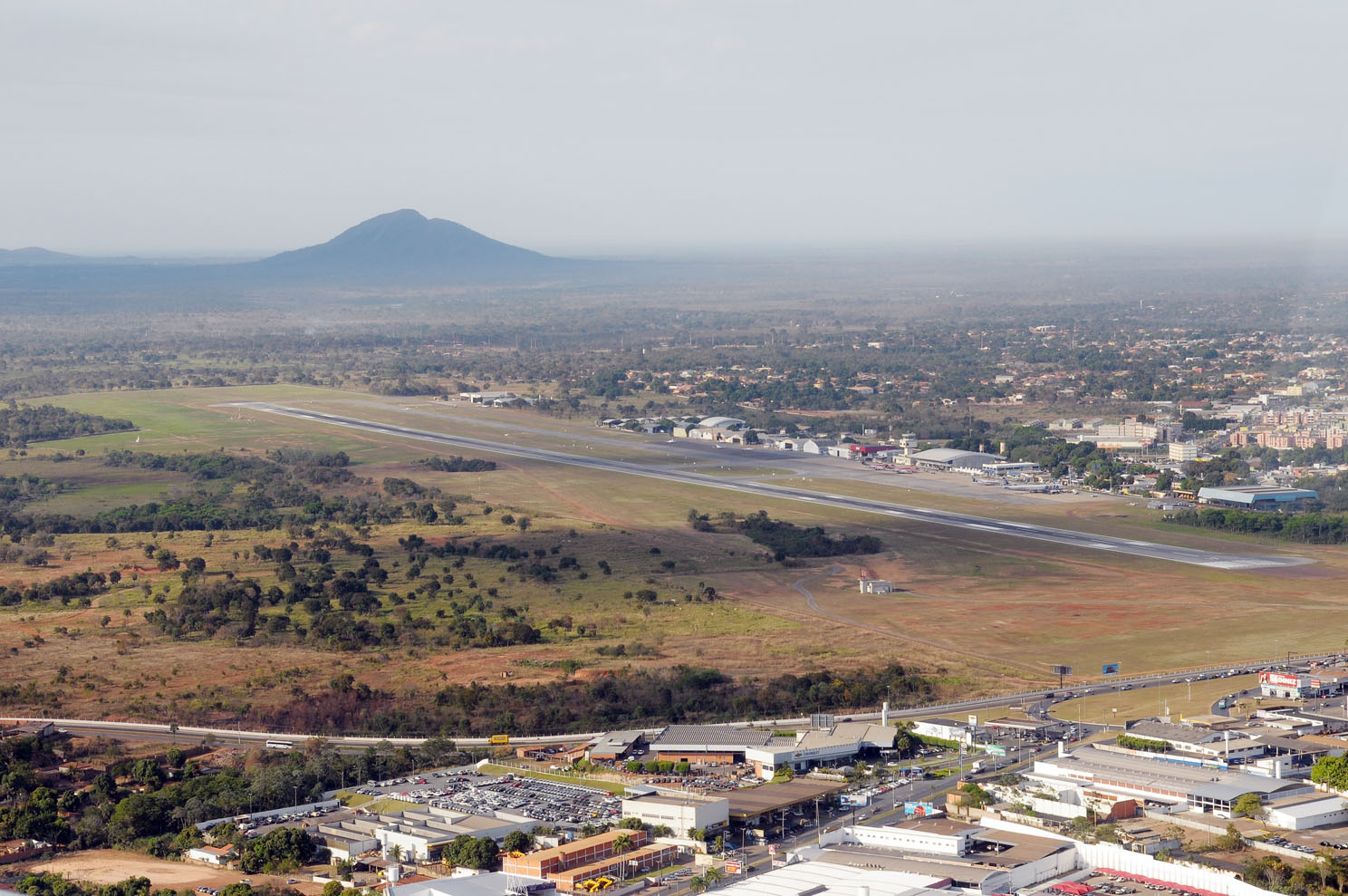
Air view of the airport

Airlines	Destinations
Azul Brazilian Airlines	Alta Floresta, Belo Horizonte–Confins, Campinas, Cacoal, Porto Velho, Ji-Paraná São José do Rio Preto, São Paulo–Congonhas, São Paulo–Guarulhos, Sinop, Vilhena; Seasonal: Maceió
Azul Conecta	Água Boa, Aripuanã, Barra do Garças, Juína
Gol Linhas Aéreas	Brasília, Porto Velho (ends 29 January 2027), São Paulo–Congonhas (ends 10 December 2027), São Paulo–Guarulhos
LATAM Brasil	Brasília, Curitiba (begins 1 March 2027), São Paulo–Congonhas, São Paulo–Guarulhos

== Statistics ==
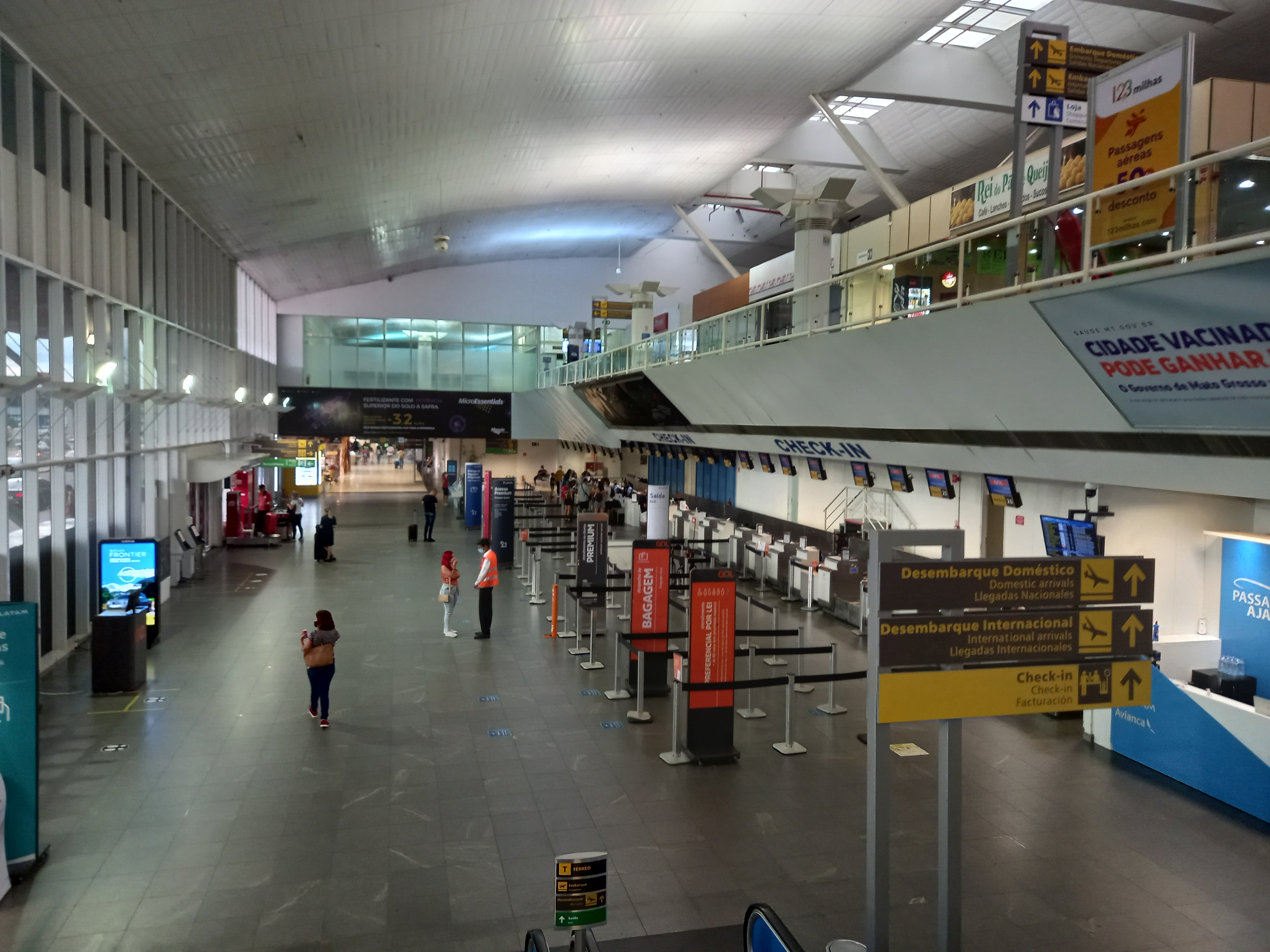
Check in area

Following is the number of passenger, aircraft and cargo movements at the airport, according to Infraero (2007–2019) and COA (2020–2024) reports:

Year	Passenger	Aircraft	Cargo (t)
2024	2,721,055 ▼5%	46,430	
2023	2,849,904 ▼4%	46,400 ▲3%	
2022	2,953,270 ▲38%	44,334 ▲21%	
2021	2,139,211 ▲46%	36,636 ▲32%	
2020	1,460,843 ▼51%	27,859 ▼38%	
2019	2,983,392 ▼2%	44,591 ▼8%	8,109 ▼5%
2018	3,032,149 ▲5%	48,406 ▼1%	8,575 ▲74%
2017	2,882,450 ▲1%	48,730 ▼5%	4,927 ▼10%
2016	2,840,559 ▼14%	51,292 ▼17%	5,487 ▼16%
2015	3,308,289	62,031 ▼4%	6,494 ▼12%
2014	3,302,940 ▲11%	64,586 ▼1%	6,238 ▼11%
2013	2,981,025 ▲8%	65,565 ▲9%	6,980 ▲3%
2012	2,761,588 ▲8%	60,138 ▲5%	6,749 ▼30%
2011	2,551,120 ▲20%	57,101 ▲6%	9,637 ▲25%
2010	2,134,267 ▲28%	53,805 ▲19%	7,720 ▲10%
2009	1,671,704 ▲20%	45,045 ▲5%	7,001 ▼18%
2008	1,396,164 ▲11%	42,942 ▲9%	8,500 ▲12%
2007	1,254,825	39,443	7,561

== Accidents and incidents ==
- 30 March 1980: a VOTEC Britten-Norman Islander registration PT-JSC stalled and crashed upon take-off from Cuiabá. All 9 occupants died.
- 23 June 1985: a TABA Embraer EMB 110 Bandeirante registration PT-GJN flying from Juara to Cuiabá, while on approach to land at Cuiabá, had technical problems on engine number 1. An emergency landing was attempted but the aircraft stalled and crashed 1 km short of the runway. All 17 occupants died.

== Access ==
The airport is located 10 km (6 mi) from downtown Cuiabá.

== See also ==
- List of airports in Brazil
