= Alta Floresta =

Alta Floresta, Mato Grosso
- Municipality
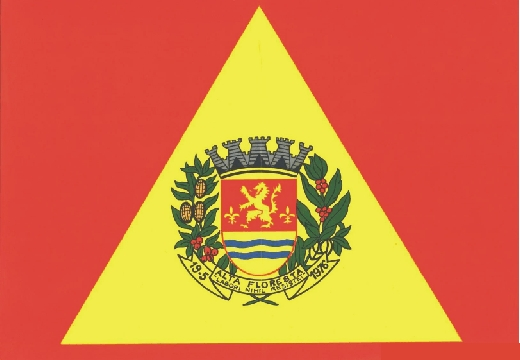
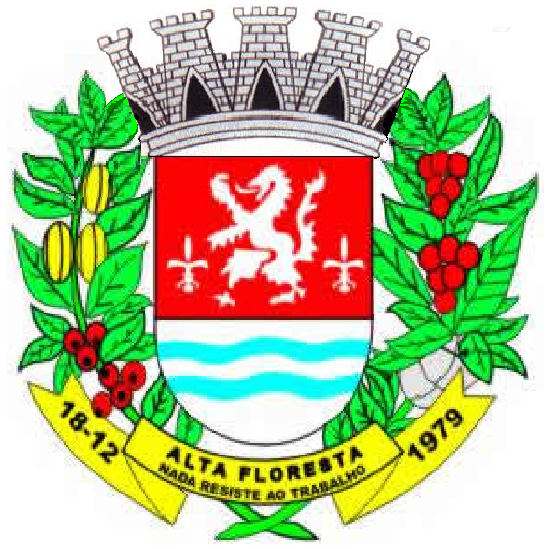
- Flag Coat of arms
- Motto: A força da União (The force of union)
- Location of Alta Floresta in Mato Grosso

- Location in Brazil
- Coordinates: 12°32′42″S 55°42′39″W
- Country: Brazil
- Region: Center-West
- State: Mato Grosso
- Mesoregion: Norte Mato-Grossense
- Founded: May 19, 1976
- Founder: Ariosto da Riva

Government
  - Mayor: Valdemar Gamba (PSD)

Area
  - Total: 3,454.483 sq mi (8,947.069 km^{2})
- Elevation: 928 ft (283 m)

Population (2022)
  - Total: 58,613
  - Density: 16.967/sq mi (6.5511/km^{2})
- Time zone: UTC−3 (BRT)
- Demonym: altaflorestense, florestense

Alta Floresta (Portuguese for "High Forest") is a municipality in Mato Grosso, Brazil. It is located at around 9°53′10″S 56°5′14″W.

The municipality is served by Piloto Osvaldo Marques Dias Airport.

The municipality contains a small part of the 184,900 hectares (457,000 acres) Cristalino State Park, created in 2001.

It had the first urban installation of aerial wildlife crossings by the Reconecta project. These aerial bridges are used by an average of 12 animals per day, and prevent an average of one animal road death per day. Six primate species are common in urban areas in the state.
