= Barra do Garças Airport =

Airport serving Barra do Garças, Brazil

Barra do Garças Airport Aeroporto de Barra do Garças
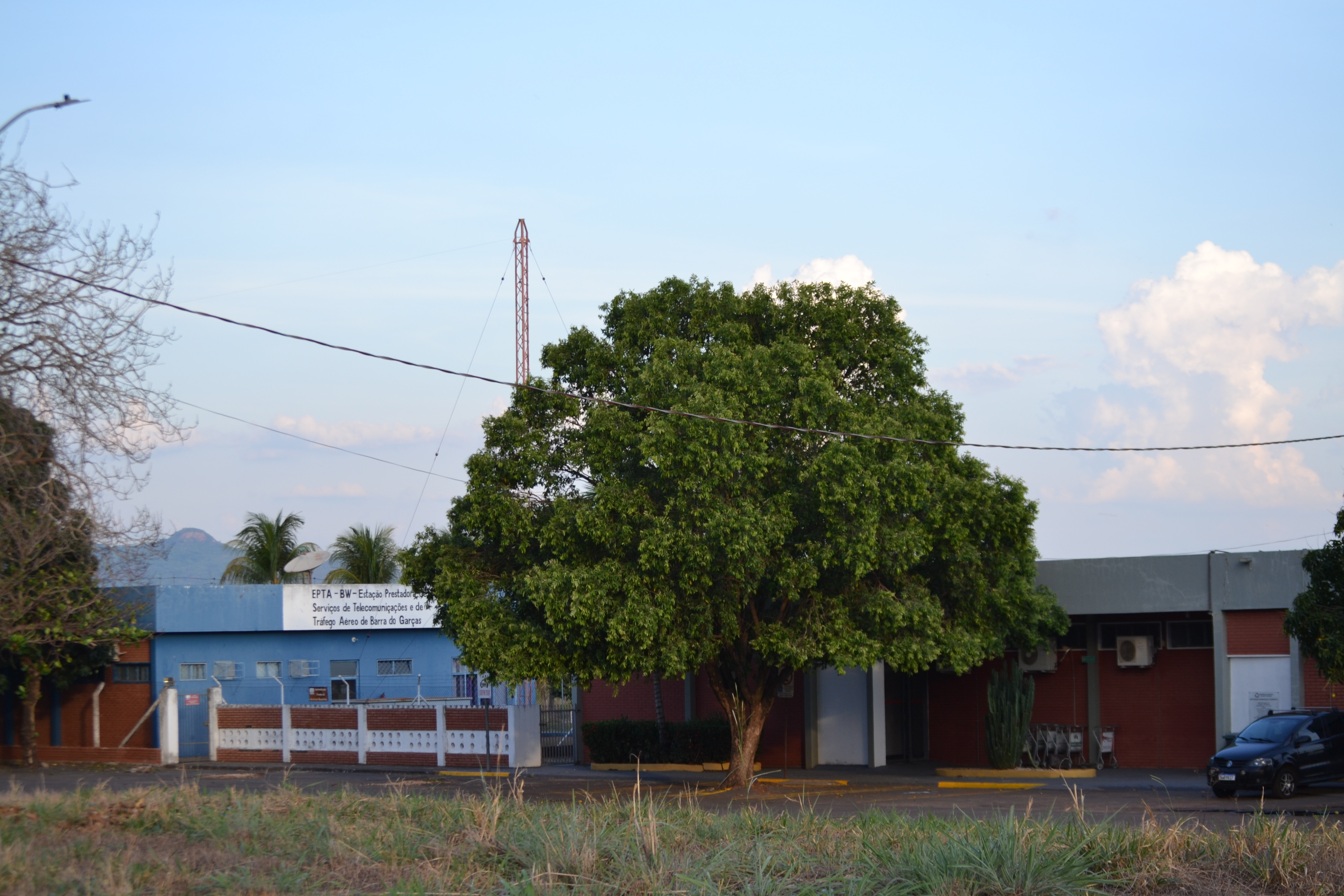
- IATA: BPG; ICAO: SBBW; LID: MT0008

Summary
- Airport type: Public
- Serves: Barra do Garças
- Time zone: BRT−1 (UTC−04:00)
- Elevation AMSL: 353 m (1,158 ft)
- Coordinates: 15°51′41″S 052°23′20″W

Map
- Location in Brazil

Runways
Direction	Length		Surface
Direction	m	ft	Surface
07/25	1,598	5,243	Asphalt
- Sources: ANAC, DECEA

Barra do Garças Airport (IATA: BPG, ICAO: SBBW) is the airport serving Barra do Garças, Brazil.

== Airlines and destinations ==
Airlines	Destinations
Azul Conecta	Cuiabá

== Access ==
The airport is located 15 km (9 mi) from downtown Barra do Garças.

== See also ==
- List of airports in Brazil
