= Juína =

- Municipality
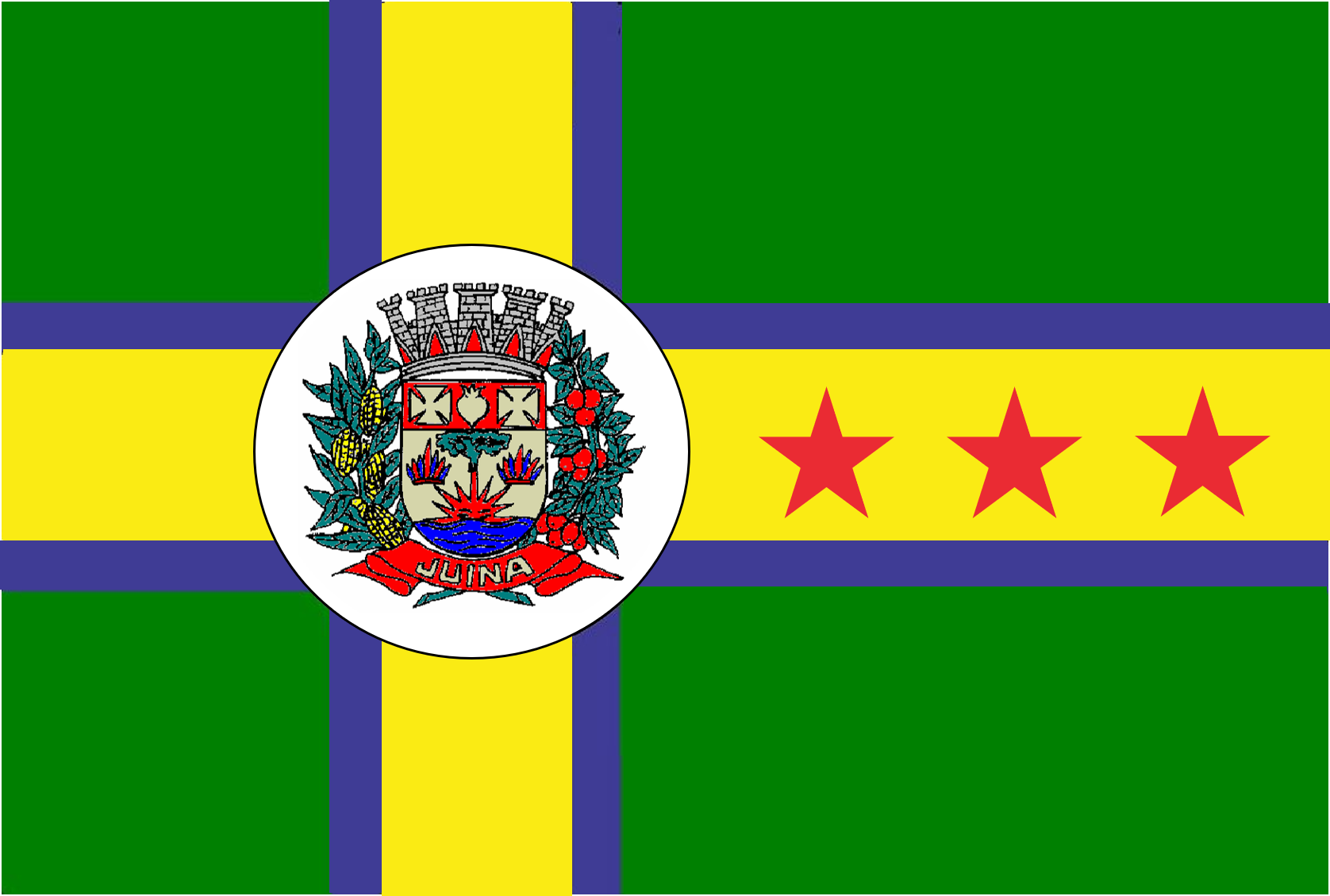
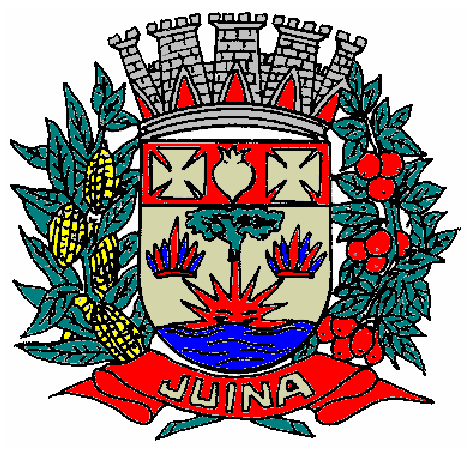
- Flag Coat of arms
- Nicknames: "Queen of the Forest" ("Rainha da Floresta") "Capital of the Little North" ("Capital do Nortinho")
- Location in Juina, Mato Grosso

- Location in Brazil
- Coordinates: 11°22′40″S 58°44′27″W
- Country: Brazil
- Region: Center-West
- State: Mato Grosso
- Mesoregion: Norte Mato-Grossense
- Founded: July 10, 1979

Government
  - Mayor: Paulo Augusto Veronese

Area
  - Total: 26,251.276 km^{2} (10,135.674 sq mi)
- Elevation: 442 m (1,450 ft)

Population (2020)
  - Total: 41,101
  - Density: 1.5657/km^{2} (4.0551/sq mi)
- Time zone: UTC−3 (BRT)

Juína is a municipality in the state of Mato Grosso in the Central-West Region of Brazil.

The municipality contains the Iquê Ecological Station. It is served by Juína Airport.

== See also ==
- List of municipalities in Mato Grosso
