= Aripuanã Airport =

Airport in Brazil

Aripuanã Airport Aeroporto de Aripuanã
- IATA: AIR; ICAO: SSOU; LID: MT0303

Summary
- Airport type: Private
- Serves: Aripuanã
- Time zone: BRT−1 (UTC−04:00)
- Elevation AMSL: 230 m (750 ft)
- Coordinates: 10°11′08″S 059°27′28″W

Map
- Location in Brazil

Runways
Direction	Length		Surface
Direction	m	ft	Surface
01/19	1,300	4,265	Asphalt
- Source: ANAC, DECEA

Aripuanã Airport (IATA: AIR, ICAO: SSOU) is the airport serving Aripuanã, Brazil.

== Airlines and destinations ==
Airlines	Destinations
Azul Conecta	Cuiabá, Juína

== Access ==
The airport is located 3 km (2 mi) from downtown Aripuanã.

== See also ==
- List of airports in Brazil
