= Água Boa Airport =

Airport in Mato Grosso, Brazil

Frederico Carlos Müller Airport Aeroporto Frederico Carlos Müller
- IATA: GGB; ICAO: SWHP; LID: MT0006

Summary
- Airport type: Public
- Serves: Água Boa
- Time zone: BRT−1 (UTC−04:00)
- Elevation AMSL: 450 m (1,480 ft)
- Coordinates: 14°01′11″S 052°09′07″W

Map
- Location in Brazil

Runways
Direction	Length		Surface
Direction	m	ft	Surface
03/21	1,627	5,338	Asphalt
- Source: ANAC, DECEA

Frederico Carlos Müller Airport (IATA: GGB, ICAO: SWHP) is the airport serving Água Boa, Brazil. It is also known as Olhos d'água after the farm where it is located.

== Airlines and destinations ==
Airlines	Destinations
Azul Conecta	Cuiabá

== Access ==
The airport is located 3 km (2 mi) from downtown Água Boa.

== See also ==
- List of airports in Brazil
