= Sinop Airport (Brazil) =

Presidente João Figueiredo Airport Aeroporto Presidente João Figueiredo
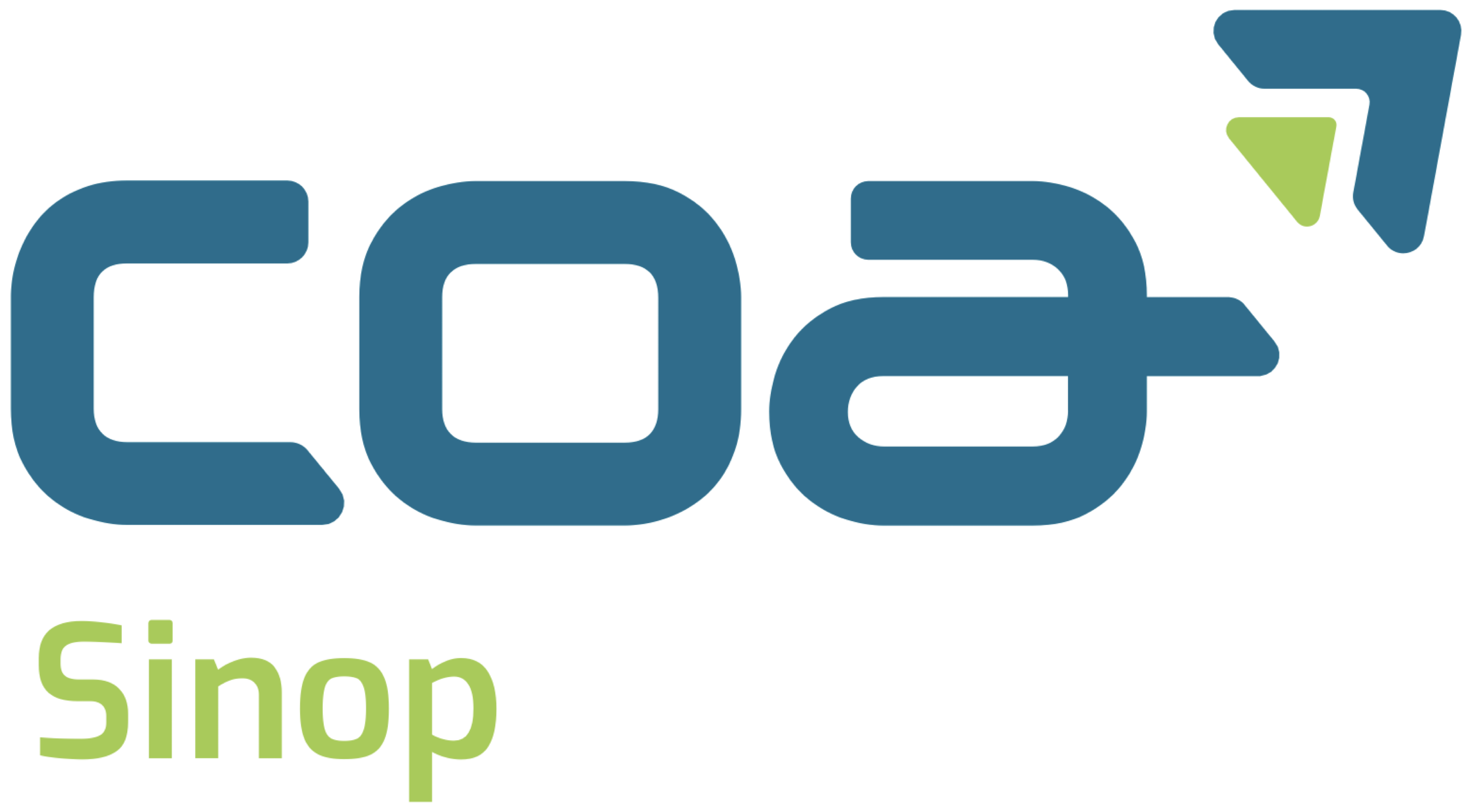

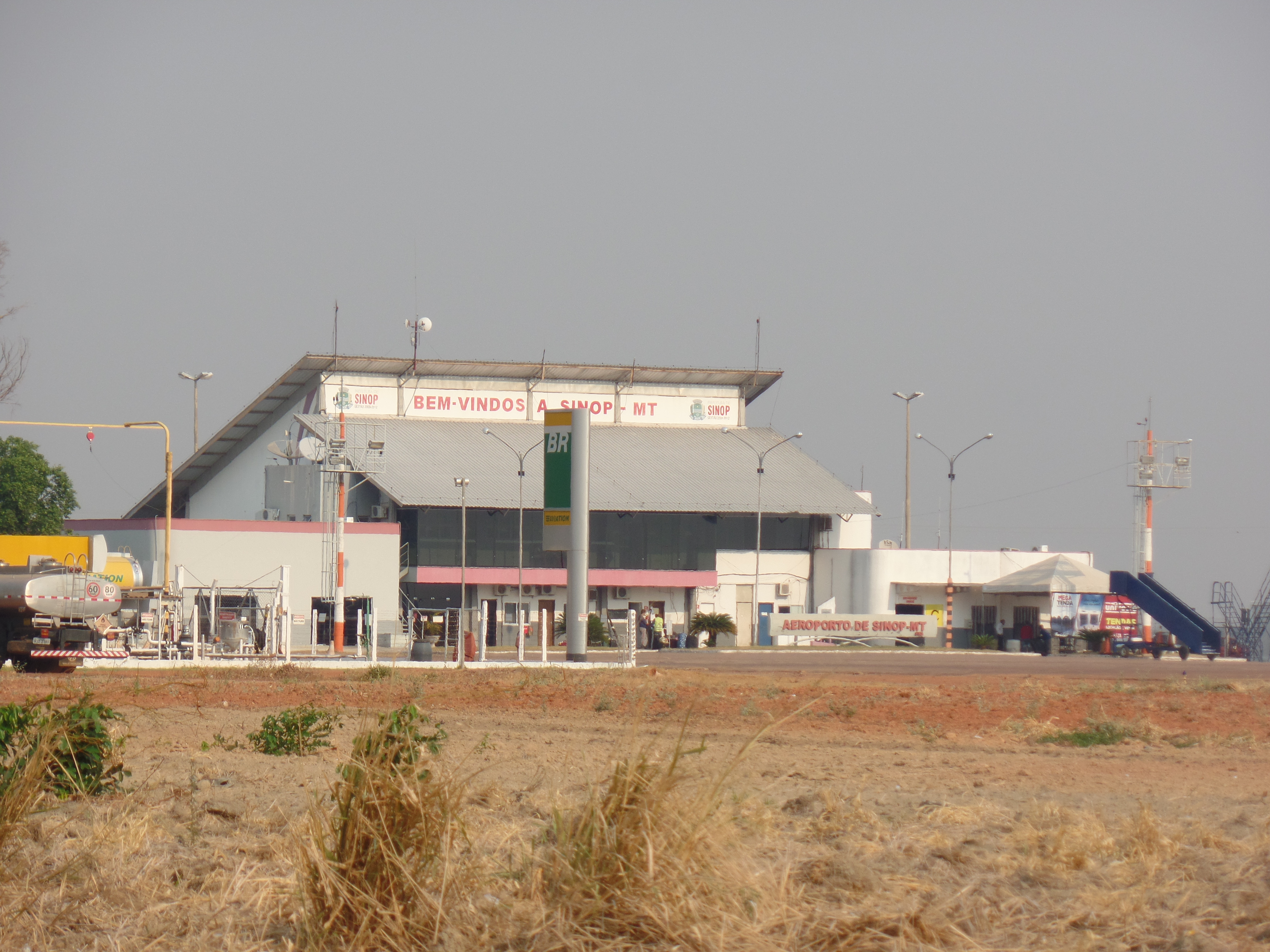
- IATA: OPS; ICAO: SBSI; LID: MT0002

Summary
- Airport type: Public
- Operator: Aeroeste (2019–present)
- Serves: Sinop
- Time zone: BRT−1 (UTC−04:00)
- Elevation AMSL: 374 m (1,227 ft)
- Coordinates: 11°53′06″S 055°35′10″W
- Website: centroeste-airports.com.br/areoporto-de-sinop/

Map
- Location in Brazil

Runways
Direction	Length		Surface
Direction	m	ft	Surface
03/21	1,630	5,348	Asphalt

Statistics (2023)
- Passengers: 344,372 ▲40%
- Aircraft Operations: 2,662 ▲29%
- Statistics: Centro-Oeste Airports; Sources: Airport Website, ANAC, DECEA

Presidente João Figueiredo Airport (IATA: OPS, ICAO: SBSI) formerly SWSI, is the airport serving Sinop, Brazil. It is named after João Baptista de Oliveira Figueiredo, the 30th President of Brazil.

It is operated by Aeroeste.

== History ==
On March 15, 2019 Aeroeste won a 30-year concession to operate the airport.

== Airlines and destinations ==
Airlines	Destinations
Azul Brazilian Airlines	Campinas, Cuiabá
Gol Linhas Aéreas	São Paulo–Guarulhos
LATAM Brasil	Brasília, São Paulo–Guarulhos

== Accidents and incidents ==
- 26 August 1993: a TAM Meridionais Cessna 208A Caravan I registration PT-OGN was hijacked and set on fire after landing at Sinop. There were no victims.

== Access ==
The airport is located 13 km (8 mi) from downtown Sinop.

== See also ==
- List of airports in Brazil
