= Pontes e Lacerda =

Coordinates: 15°13′33″S 59°20′06″W

- Municipality
- The Municipality of Pontes e Lacerda
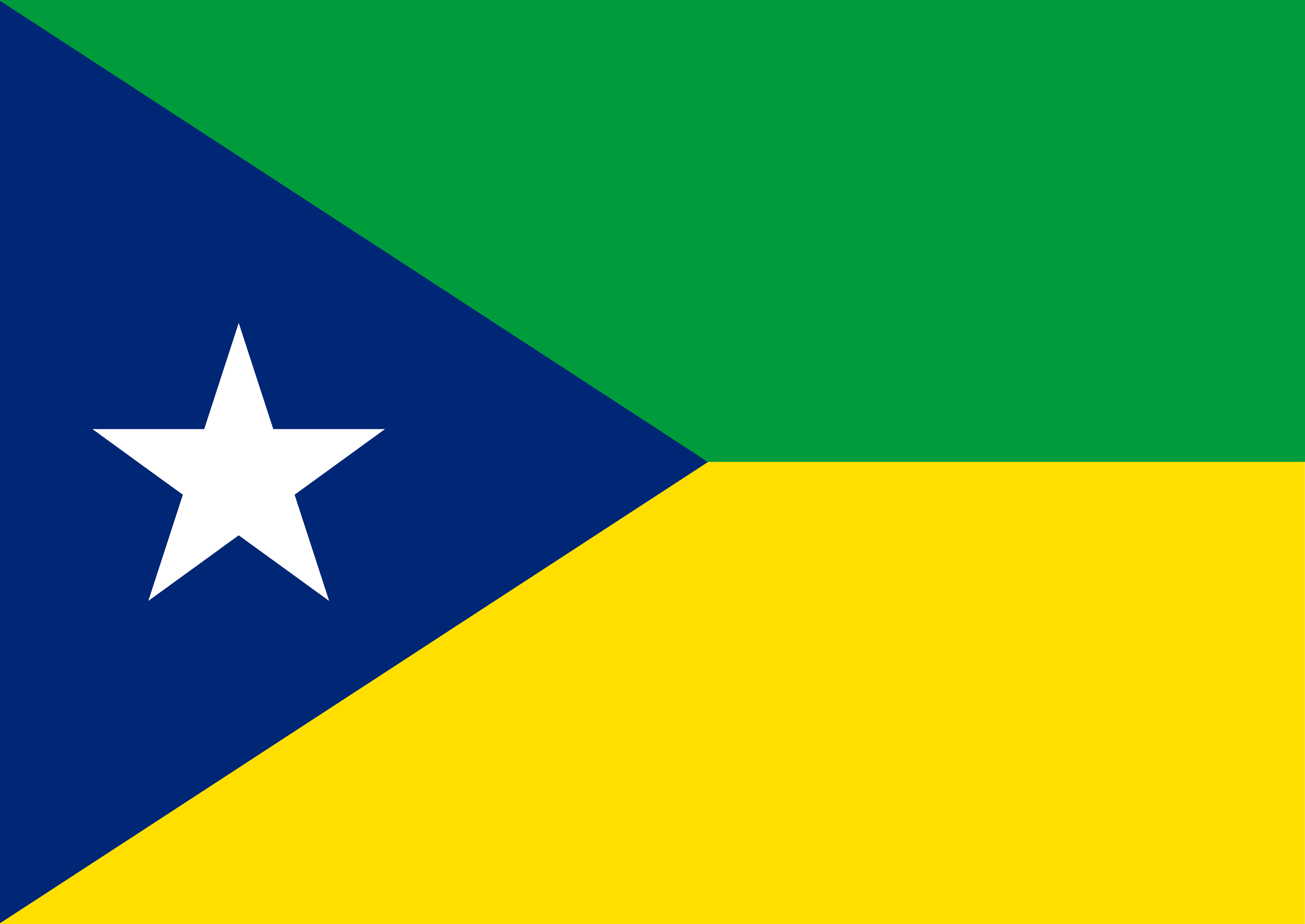
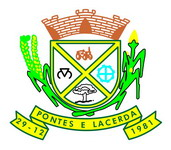
- Flag Coat of arms
- Nickname: "Princesinha do Guaporé"
- Location of Pontes e Lacerda
- Country: Brazil
- Region: Central-West
- State: Mato Grosso
- Founded: December 29, 1979

Government
  - Mayor: Alcino Pereira Barcelos (2021–2024)

Population (2020)
  - Total: 45,774
- Time zone: UTC−3 (BRT)

Pontes e Lacerda is a municipality in the Brazilian state of Mato Grosso.

== Location ==
Pontes e Lacerda is located 450 km from Cuiabá, at a latitude 15° 13'34" south and a longitude 59° 20'07" west, with an altitude of 254 meters. Its estimated population in 2020 was 45,774 inhabitants. It has an area of 8,423 square kilometers.

The municipality contains 73% of the 120,092 hectares (296,750 acres) Serra de Santa Bárbara State Park, created in 1997.

== Transportation ==
The city is served by Pontes e Lacerda Airport.
