= Juara =

- Municipality
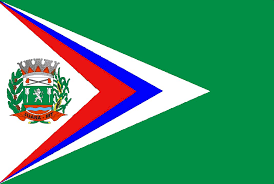
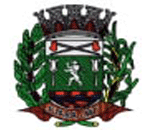
- Flag Coat of arms

- Location in Mato Grosso state

- Location in Brazil
- Coordinates: 11°15′18″S 57°31′12″W
- Country: Brazil
- Region: Central-West
- State: Mato Grosso

Area
  - Total: 22,622.350 km^{2} (8,734.538 sq mi)

Population (2020)
  - Total: 35,121
  - Density: 1.5525/km^{2} (4.0209/sq mi)
- Time zone: UTC−3 (BRT)

Juara is a municipality located in the state of Mato Grosso in the Central-West Region of Brazil. It is known as the Cattle Capital. Its area is 22,622.350 km^{2} (8,734.538 sq mi), and its population is 35,121 inhabitants (2020 estimate). The town's economy is based in three field: Wood extraction, cattle rearing and agriculture. However, the wood is coming to an end. Because of that, the development has become slow in this place. Juara is situated about 730 km from the state capital which is Cuiabá, there are two highways of which one is MT 338 that links Juara to Cuiabá and the other is MT 220 that links Juara to Sinop. In the last years many people have moved away because of the lack of jobs and education. The students who want to go to a good college have to move to other cities, they usually move to Sinop or Cuiabá. The distance from the capital of Mato Grosso is vast, it takes about 12 hours by bus from Juara to Cuiabá. For this reason, population prefer to go to Sinop by bus because it is nearer than Cuiabá and then they take an airplane there, but the flight is expensive.

== Transportation ==
The city is served by the Mauro Luiz Frizon Airport.

== See also ==
- List of municipalities in Mato Grosso
