= São Félix do Araguaia =

- Municipality
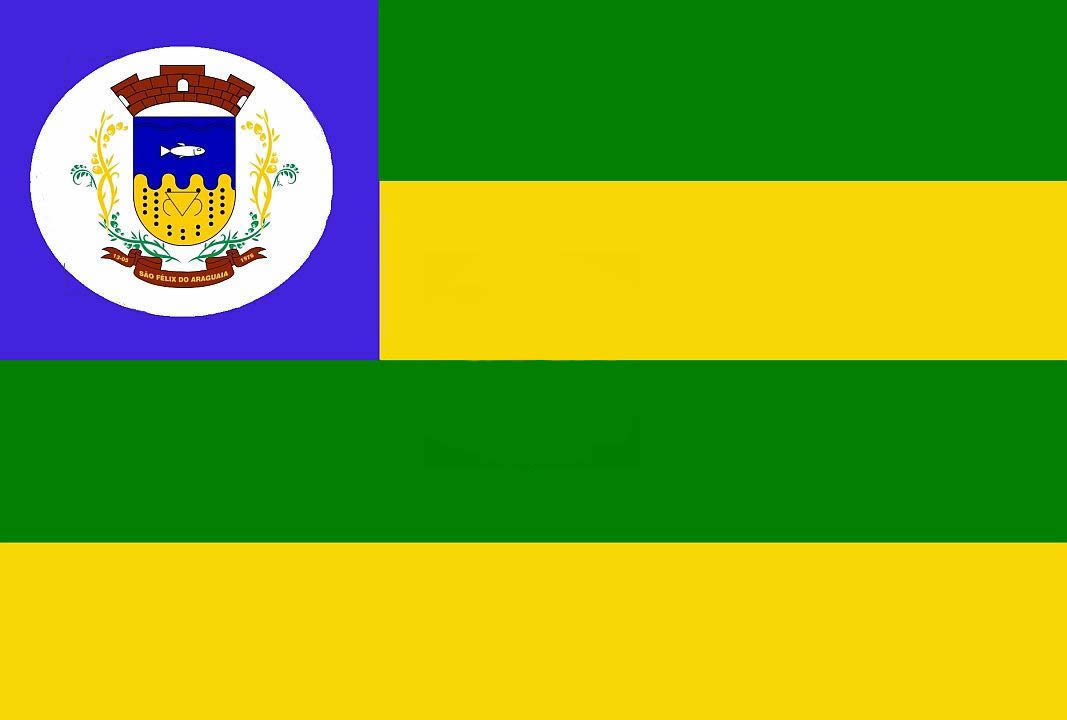
- Flag

- Location of São Félix do Araguaia in Mato Grosso

- Location of São Félix do Araguaia in Brazil
- Coordinates: 11°37′1″S 50°40′8″W
- Country: Brazil
- Region: Center-West
- State: Mato Grosso
- Mesoregion: Nordeste Mato-Grossense

Population (2020)
  - Total: 11,843
- Time zone: UTC−3 (BRT)

São Félix do Araguaia is a municipality in the state of Mato Grosso in the Central-West Region of Brazil.

The city is served by São Félix do Araguaia Airport.

== See also ==
- List of municipalities in Mato Grosso
