= Juína Airport =

Juína Airport Aeroporto de Juína
- IATA: JIA; ICAO: SWJN; LID: MT0007

Summary
- Airport type: Public
- Serves: Juína
- Time zone: BRT−1 (UTC−04:00)
- Elevation AMSL: 330 m (1,080 ft)
- Coordinates: 11°25′10″S 058°42′36″W

Map
- Location in Brazil

Runways
Direction	Length		Surface
Direction	m	ft	Surface
17/35	1,550	5,085	Asphalt
- Source: ANAC, DECEA

Juína Airport (IATA: JIA, ICAO: SWJN) is the airport serving Juína, Brazil.

== Airlines and destinations ==
Airlines	Destinations
Azul Conecta	Aripuanã, Cuiabá

== Access ==
The airport is located 2 km (1 mi) from downtown Juína.

== See also ==
- List of airports in Brazil
