= Vila Rica, Mato Grosso =

Coordinates: 10.0119°S 51.1158°W

Vila Rica
- Municipality
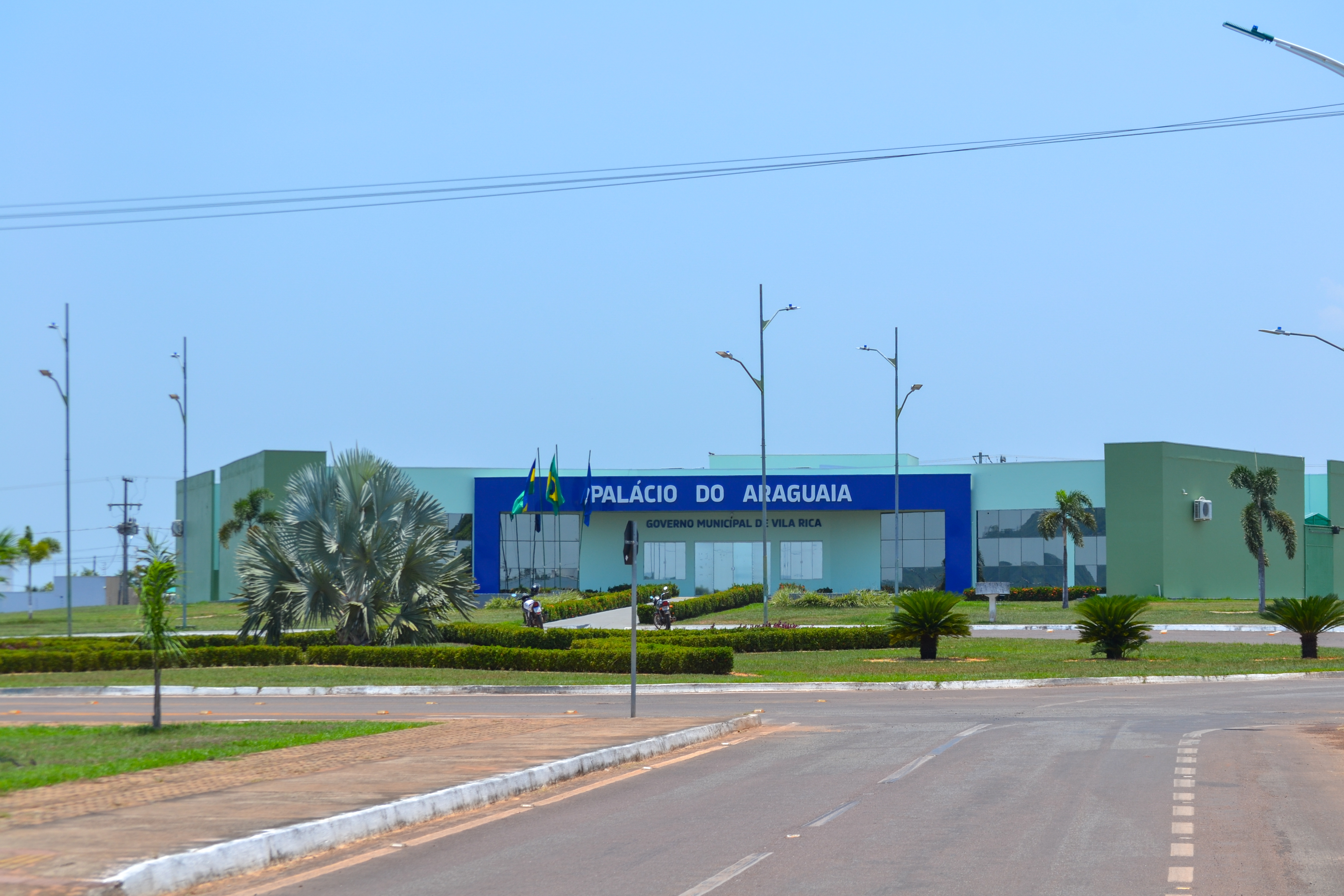

- Coat of arms

- Country: Brazil
- Region: Center-West
- State: Mato Grosso
- Mesoregion: Nordeste Mato-Grossense

Population (2020)
  - Total: 26,496
- Time zone: UTC−3 (BRT)

Vila Rica is a municipality in the state of Mato Grosso in the Central-West Region of Brazil.

== Transportation ==
The city is served by Vila Rica Airport.

== See also ==
- List of municipalities in Mato Grosso
