= Juara Airport =

Mauro Luiz Frizon Airport Aeroporto Mauro Luiz Frizon
- IATA: JUA; ICAO: SIZX; LID: MT0018

Summary
- Airport type: Public
- Serves: Juara
- Time zone: BRT−1 (UTC−04:00)
- Elevation AMSL: 302 m (991 ft)
- Coordinates: 11°17′48″S 057°32′56″W

Map
- Location in Brazil

Runways
Direction	Length		Surface
Direction	m	ft	Surface
11/29	1,200	3,937	Gravel
- Sources: ANAC, DECEA

Mauro Luiz Frizon Airport (IATA: JUA, ICAO: SIZX) is the airport serving Juara, Brazil.

== Access ==
The airport is located 6 km (4 mi) from downtown Juara.

== See also ==
- List of airports in Brazil
