= Canarana, Mato Grosso =

Municipality in the state of Mato Grosso, Brazil

Canarana
- Municipality
- The Municipality of Canarana
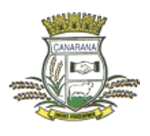
- Flag Coat of arms

- Location of Canarana in Mato Grosso state
- Coordinates: 13°33′16″S 52°16′20″W
- Country: Brazil
- Region: Central-West
- State: Mato Grosso
- Founded: February 15, 1975

Government
  - Mayor: Vilson Biguelini (União Brasil, 2025 - 2028)

Area
  - Total: 10,834.325 km^{2} (4,183.156 sq mi)
- Elevation: 200 m (660 ft)

Population (2022)
  - Total: 25,848
  - Density: 2.38/km^{2} (6.2/sq mi)
- Time zone: UTC−3 (BRT)
- HDI (2000): 0.761 – medium

Canarana is a municipality in the Brazilian state of Mato Grosso.

== Transportation ==
The city is served by Canarana Airport.

== Climate ==
According to data from the National Institute of Meteorology (INMET), since 1995 the lowest temperature recorded in Canarana was 10.3 °C (50.5 °F) on 4 July 2011, and the highest reached 42 °C (108 °F) on 25 September 2010. The highest accumulated precipitation in 24 hours was 147.2 millimetres (5.80 in) on 8 February 2004. Other large accumulations equal to or greater than 100 millimetres (3.9 in) were 122 millimetres (4.8 in) on 18 March 2017, 119.7 millimetres (4.71 in) on 13 December 2012, 114.9 millimetres (4.52 in) on 4 February 2008, 114.2 millimetres (4.50 in) on 13 March 2003, 107.3 millimetres (4.22 in) on 1 February 2007, 104.7 millimetres (4.12 in) on 1 February 2008, 104.4 millimetres (4.11 in) on 20 December 2014, 102.6 millimetres (4.04 in) on 17 February 2014, 102.4 millimetres (4.03 in) on 25 February 2004 and 102.1 millimetres (4.02 in) on 25 January 2000. January 2004, with 726.2 millimetres (28.59 in), was the wettest month on record.

Climate data for Canarana (1981–2010)
Month	Jan	Feb	Mar	Apr	May	Jun	Jul	Aug	Sep	Oct	Nov	Dec	Year
Mean daily maximum °C (°F)	31.3 (88.3)	31.5 (88.7)	31.9 (89.4)	32.4 (90.3)	32.8 (91.0)	33.0 (91.4)	33.9 (93.0)	35.6 (96.1)	36.0 (96.8)	34.5 (94.1)	32.5 (90.5)	31.2 (88.2)	33.1 (91.6)
Daily mean °C (°F)	25.1 (77.2)	25.1 (77.2)	25.2 (77.4)	25.3 (77.5)	24.7 (76.5)	23.9 (75.0)	24.3 (75.7)	26.1 (79.0)	27.3 (81.1)	26.6 (79.9)	25.7 (78.3)	25.1 (77.2)	25.4 (77.7)
Mean daily minimum °C (°F)	21.3 (70.3)	21.3 (70.3)	21.2 (70.2)	20.7 (69.3)	19.0 (66.2)	17.2 (63.0)	16.9 (62.4)	18.4 (65.1)	20.7 (69.3)	21.5 (70.7)	21.5 (70.7)	21.4 (70.5)	20.1 (68.2)
Average precipitation mm (inches)	314.3 (12.37)	358.4 (14.11)	243.0 (9.57)	128.4 (5.06)	4.8 (0.19)	5.8 (0.23)	5.6 (0.22)	1.2 (0.05)	47.1 (1.85)	158.4 (6.24)	232.9 (9.17)	300.4 (11.83)	1,800.3 (70.88)
Average precipitation days (≥ 1.0 mm)	18	17	17	9	1	1	0	1	4	10	16	18	112
Average relative humidity (%)	85.5	86.3	85.5	80.7	70.0	59.5	50.7	43.8	53.7	71.3	80.1	85.6	71.1
Source: Instituto Nacional de Meteorologia

== Latest elected mayors ==
Year	Mayor	Party	Votes	%	Ref
2004	Walter Farias	PPS	5,001	58.95	
2008	Walter Farias	PR	5,138	52.14	
2012	Evaldo	PSD	5,240	50.29	
2016	Fabio Faria	PSDB	7,075	66.08	
2020	Fabio Faria	DEM	6,116	59.38	
2024	Vilson Biguelini	União Brasil	6,320	51.34	
