= Água Boa, Mato Grosso =

Água Boa
- Municipality
- Flag Coat of arms

- Location in Mato Grosso state

- Location in Brazil
- Coordinates: 14°03′00″S 52°09′32″W
- Country: Brazil
- Region: Central-West
- State: Mato Grosso

Population (2020)
  - Total: 26,204
- Time zone: UTC−3 (BRT)

Água Boa (English: Good Water) is a town in the Brazilian state of Mato Grosso.

In August 2007 an important Italian wind orchestra has performed there: the Orchestra Fiati Giovanile Italiana e Coro "I Music Piemonteis" conducted by Ugo Bairo, and his choir, conducted by Carmelo Luca Sambataro. There he premiered his wind composition dedicated to the local government: The Mato Grosso March.

It is served by Água Boa Airport.
