= Barra do Garças =

- Municipality
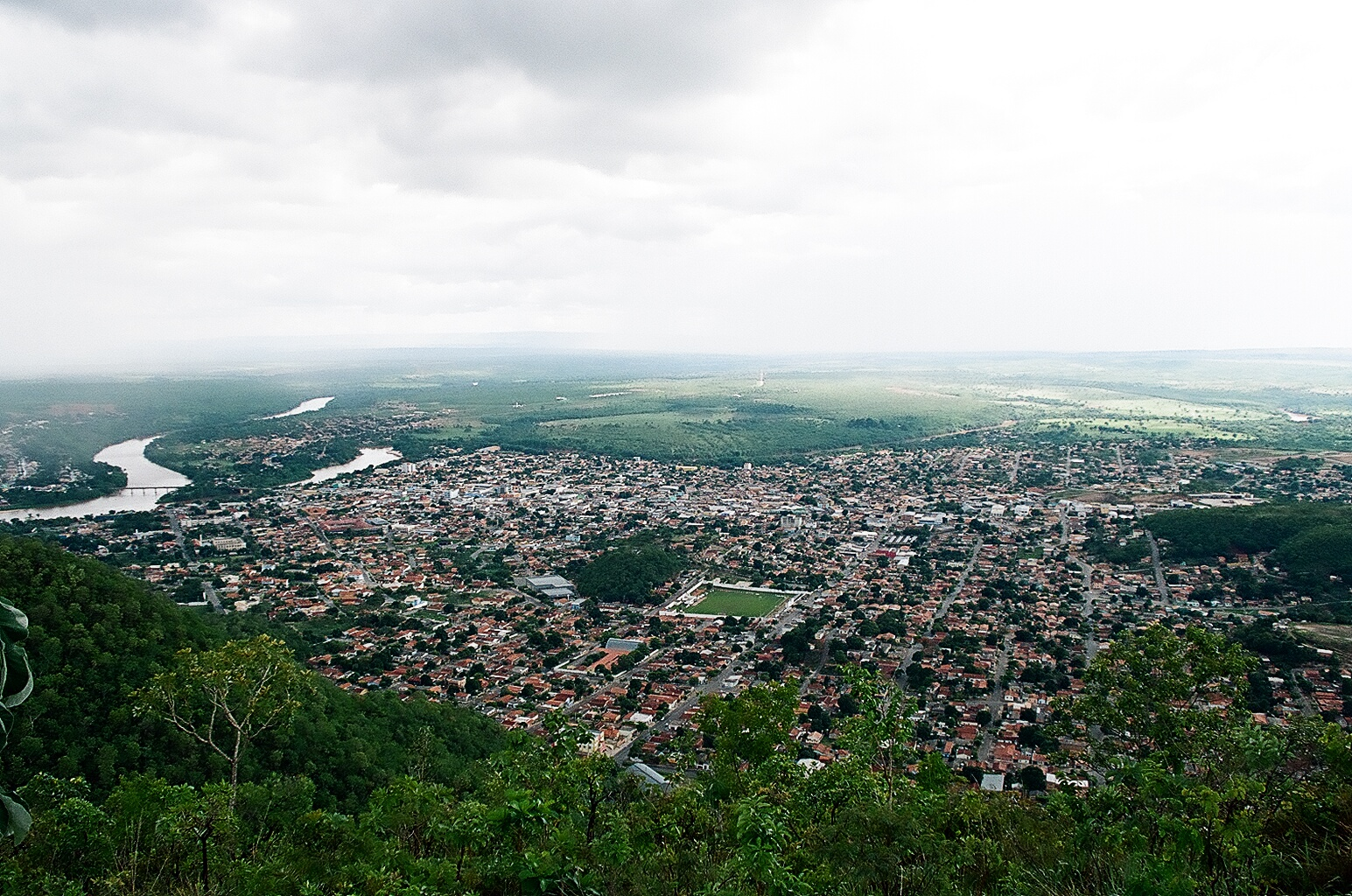
- View of Barra do Garças

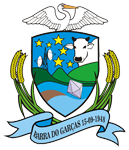
- Flag Coat of arms

- Location in Mato Grosso state

- Location in Brazil
- Coordinates: 15°53′24″S 52°15′24″W
- Country: Brazil
- Region: Central-West
- State: Mato Grosso

Population (2020)
  - Total: 61,135
- Time zone: UTC−4 (AMT)

Barra do Garças is a city with a population of 61,135 located in the Brazilian state of Mato Grosso, around 550 km (340 mi) from the capital city of Cuiabá. It was founded on 13 June 1924, but it became politically independent on 15 September 1948. Nowadays, Barra do Garças is the 8th biggest city in Mato Grosso. The city is situated on the border between the Mato Grosso and Goiás states and due to this the area is considered a geodesic center.

A small but developed tourist city due to high agriculture exportation and a strong military presence, Barra do Garças also has a Cristo Redentor (Christ the Redeemer) statue and is known as Rio de Janeiro do Oeste (Rio de Janeiro of the West.)

The municipality contains the 11,002 hectares (27,190 acres) Serra Azul State Park, created in 1994. Barra do Garças has many other tourist attractions: a Discoporto, (UFOport), water parks, as well as hot springs, mountains, and fresh water beaches.

The city is served by Barra do Garças Airport.
