= Sinop, Mato Grosso =

- Municipality
- The Municipality of Sinop
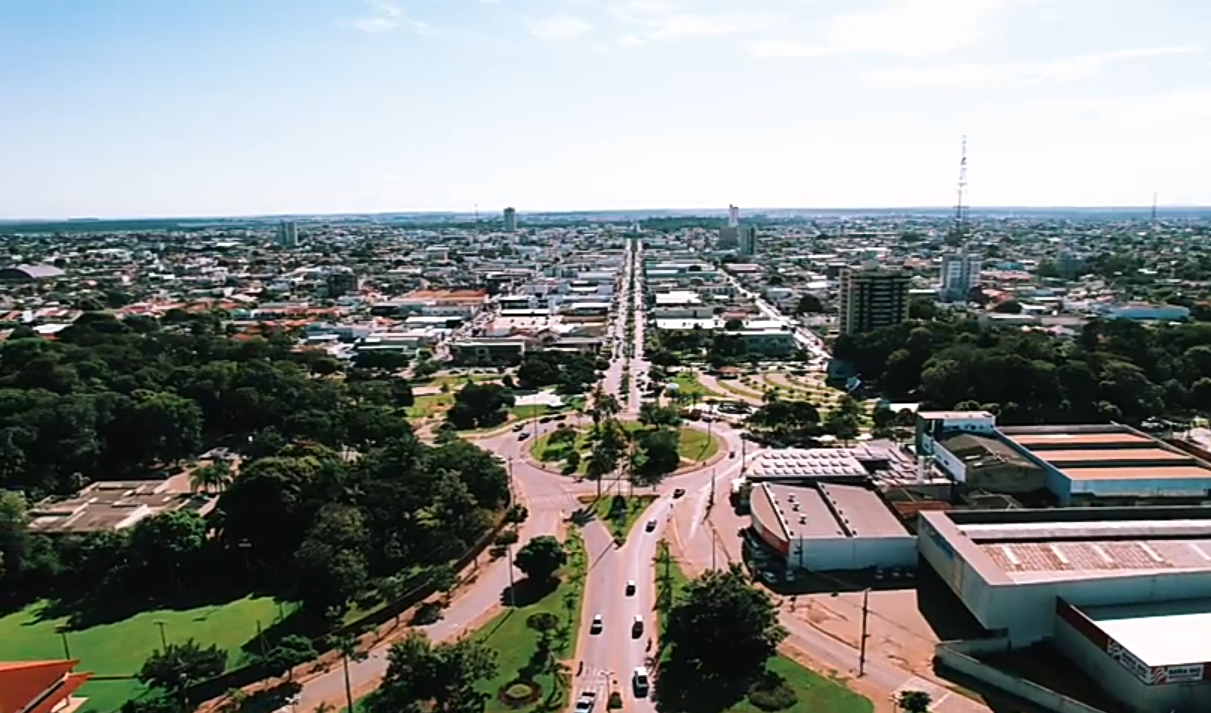
- View of Sinop

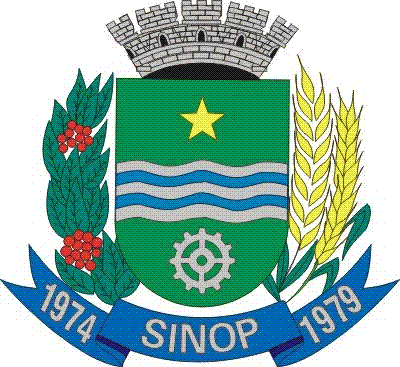
- Flag Coat of arms
- Nickname: "Capital of the Big North" ("Capital do Nortão")
- Location of Sinop, Mato Grosso

- Location in Brazil
- Coordinates: 11°50′53″S 55°38′57″W
- Country: Brazil
- Region: Central-West
- State: Mato Grosso
- Founded: September 14, 1974

Government
  - Mayor: Roberto Dorner (republicanos)

Area
  - Total: 3,194.339 km^{2} (1,233.341 sq mi)
- Elevation: 384 m (1,260 ft)

Population (2022 Brazilian census)
  - Total: 196,312
  - Estimate (2025): 223,780
  - Density: 36.318/km^{2} (94.06/sq mi)
- Demonym: sinopense
- Time zone: UTC−4 (AMT)

Sinop is a city in the Brazilian state of Mato Grosso. The fourth-largest city in the state, its population in 2025 is estimated at 223,780 inhabitants, placing Sinop in 155th place in Brazil. It has an area of 3194.339 km². A Sivam radar has been installed for monitoring the Amazon Basin. Also Embrapa has a branch in Sinop, the only one in the state of Mato Grosso. It is known as the Capital of Nortão, a major city of northern Mato Grosso.

== Geography ==
Sinop is located in the northwest of the Midwest region of Brazil, in the north of Mato Grosso, in the micro-region of Sinop. Located at latitude 11 º 50'53 " South and longitude 55 ° 38'57" West. Geographical data from Sinop:

- Geological formation: non-folded covers the Phanerozoic and Quaternary basin of the Upper Xingu
- Relief and altitude: Residual Northern Plateau and Mato Grosso Plateau Parecis.
- Altitude of 384 meters above the sea level.
- Hydrography: Amazon Basin. Teles Pires River, a major tributary of the Rio Tapajos.
- Climate and rainfall: equatorial, with about six months of drought and annual rainfall of 2,500 mm.
- Average annual temperature of 24 °C (between 40 °C and the minimum below 20 °C).
- Area: 3194.339 km ² urban and 9 of 17 km

== Origin ==
In the early 1970s, a company, Sinop Terras, started the construction of a city in northern Mato Grosso, on a land tract called Gleba Celeste, divided into 5 lots. The construction of Sinop resembles the construction of Brasília, which occurred some 10 years earlier, because it was built very quickly (in a few years). Colonization initially was made by Paraná settlers, but soon, the developing new city attracted Brazilians from all regions of the country, especially from the South, North and Northeast of Brazil.

== Trajectory ==
In 1948 Ênio Pipino and João Pedro Moreira de Carvalho founded Sociedade Imobiliária Noroeste do Paraná (Northwestern Paraná Real Estate Society), better known as Sinop Terras S / A. In 1954 Pipino goes to the State, where he founded several cities. In the early 1970s, the north of Mato Grosso was scarcely populated. An area of 645 hectares called Gleba Celeste (which originated Sinop) initiates colonization, situated 500 km from Cuiaba BR-163 (Cuiabá-Santarém excerpt).

The Núcleo de Colonização Celeste (Celeste Center for Settlement) belonged to Jorge Martins Phillip and had initial area of 198 000 hectares of land designated for settlement, being acquired in 1971 by Pipino. The opening of the first streets of Sinop began in May 1972 and the first families of pioneers soon arrived in the city. Back then, expeditions from Paraná to Sinop used to take about 7 days. But despite this great difficulty, the migratory flow towards the West that accompanied the indentation of the agricultural frontier in northern Mato Grosso grew increasingly. The project execution took place about 400 men and machines who crossed the Verde River and opened the first bites in the jungle.

The date of its foundation ended up being on September 14, 1974, and the acronym SINOP was adopted as the city's name (not to be confused with the ancient city in the province of Sinop, Turkey of the same name). Development was rapid and the largest number of migrants arrived in 1975. The city was already a real construction site, with more than 20 blocks, 1400 km of local roads, experimental fields, community center, schools, infrastructure support to support new residents, Brazilians from all regions of the country.

On July 24, 1976, Governor José Garcia Neto signed the Law 3.754/76, rising Sinop to the rank of district of Chapada dos Guimarães. On December 17, 1979, the Governor Frederico Campos signed Law 4.156/79, which raised Sinop to a municipality.

== Economy ==
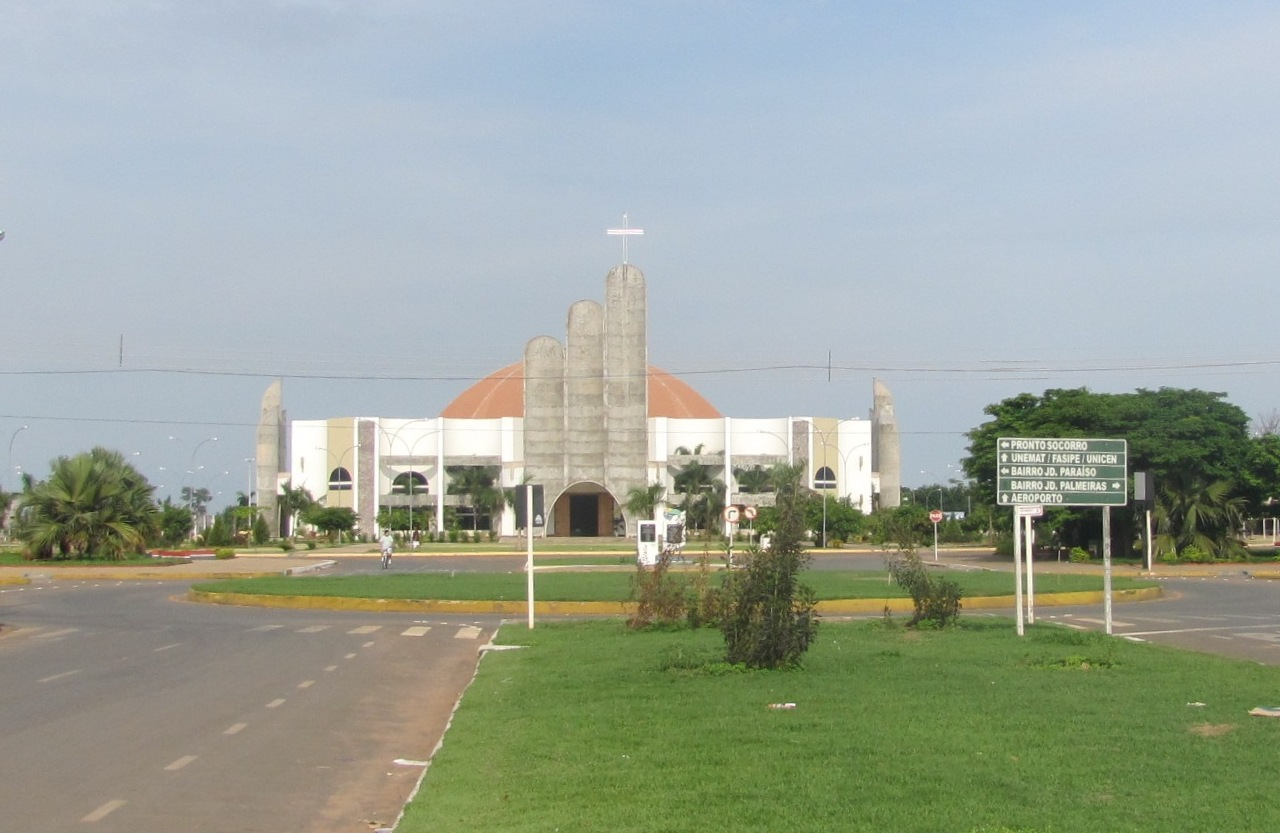

The principal economic activity is the provision of services, with great emphasis also to the livestock industry (cattle and pigs), cotton and grains (soybeans, corn and rice) cultivation and timber industry. There are over 10 000 companies located in Sinop, of which 1,401 belong to the industry sector, 3,197 of wholesale and retail, and 5243 to services. The city is working on creating projects for the installation of two industrial districts in the municipality, one designed for companies and other for non-polluting industries by facilitating the structuring of areas.

=== Primary sector ===
The agricultural sector is considered its main economic activity, especially for growing grain.

=== Secondary sector ===
Sinop has approximately 1,000 industries, especially in the logging industry.

=== Health ===
The city has three hospitals and prompt attention. The city installed the only Ala Oncology of upstate region, with twenty beds.

=== Public security ===
Federal Police Military Police - 11th Battalion of Military Police Fire Brigade - 4th Fire Department Battalion Military Civil Police Official identification expertise and Mato Grosso technique of Criminal Expert (POLITEC) Municipal Guard Traffic.

=== Education system ===
Sinop has more than 27,000 students enrolled in public and private schools according to the IBGE in 2009. In Sinop there are several elementary and high schools. The city is also known for being a university town, it has several institutions of higher learning such as:

Federal University of Mato Grosso - UFMT. University of the State of Mato Grosso - UNEMAT. University of Cuiabá - UNIC. Schools of Sinop - FASIPE. The city has 24 schools serving the children's education 12 public schools 12 private schools More than 40 attending primary school 11 public schools 21 public schools 9 private schools And 13 schools for high school 7 public schools 6 private schools There are several in the city schools of foreign languages, and some of these: CNA, Fisk and Wizard.

=== Communications ===
The city has major telephony operators, mobile and fixed; eleven broadband internet providers; four radio stations; eight channels of television.

MW radio stations:

- Radio MAIS - 550 kHz
- Radio Celeste - 610 kHz

FM radio stations:

- Hits FM - 87.9 MHz
- Meridional FM - 98.9 MHz

Stations and TV relay:

- GenteTV - RedeTV - channel 02
- TV Cidade - SBT - channel 04 (digital 48)
- TV Centro America - Rede Globo - channel 05 (Digital 31)
- Real TV - Rede Record - channel 08
- TV MAIS - Rede Brasil de Televisão - channel 13
- Rede Vida - channel 15 (Digital 43)
- TV Nazaré - channel 17
- TV Cidade Verde - Rede Bandeirantes - channel 28.

=== Transport ===
- Sinop Airport (Brazil).
- By air access to the city is carried out by Sinop Airport (Brazil) come mainly from the cities of Cuiabá, Campinas and Brasília. The airport is located 13.4 km from the city center and has night marking since May 2008; having a track with 1630 meters long and 30 meters wide. Currently, both companies are active in providing regular flights services: Passaredo Linhas Aéreas and Azul Airlines.

Overland access to the city is done mainly by BR-163, which in the urban area is doubled.

In Sinop there is no transport by rail and not by waterway.

Eight companies make intercity transport and operates in urban transportation.

=== Tourism and culture ===
The city is bathed by the Teles Pires River, tributary of the Tapajos River, which flows into the Amazon River. The Teles Pires allows diverse sports activities, such as amateur and sport fishing, canoeing, rafting, among others. Also in the same river for the Cut Beach, important leisure option the municipality.

In the urban part is the Ecological Park of Sinop, located in Garden Springs neighborhood.

The municipality also has:

Public Library Sinop; House of Sinop Culture; Events center Dante de Oliveira, with amphitheater for seven hundred people, exhibition center and two pavilions for symposia or other ceremonies.

Municipal Stadium Massami Uriu. The city has the Northern Giant Stadium, popularly known as "Gigantão" which is structured to accommodate up to 13,000 people, where he plays the Sinop Futebol Clube, the official team of the city, where it was revealed the current keeper of São Paulo FC, Rogério Ceni. At this stage already occurred departures of big teams like Santos and São Paulo against local Sinop FC.

Another local college football is the Athletic Association Sinop.

In the city there is also a Sports Complex Sinop and the Memorial Rogério Ceni (which is belongings such as gloves, shirts and captain of the awards are Pauline, who grew up in the city).

There is also the city the Olympic Games in Sinop, with several sports among students. Sinop is also the hometown of Motocross Freestyle Gilmar Flores pilot (also known as "Ladybug")

== Details of the city of Sinop ==
- Sinop - latitude and longitude information
- Instituto Brasileiro de Geografia e Estatística (IBGE) (Portuguese)
