= 2024 Cuiabá mayoral election =

- 6 October 2024 (first round); 27 October 2024 (second round)
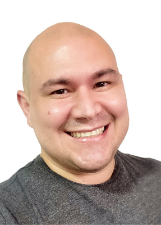

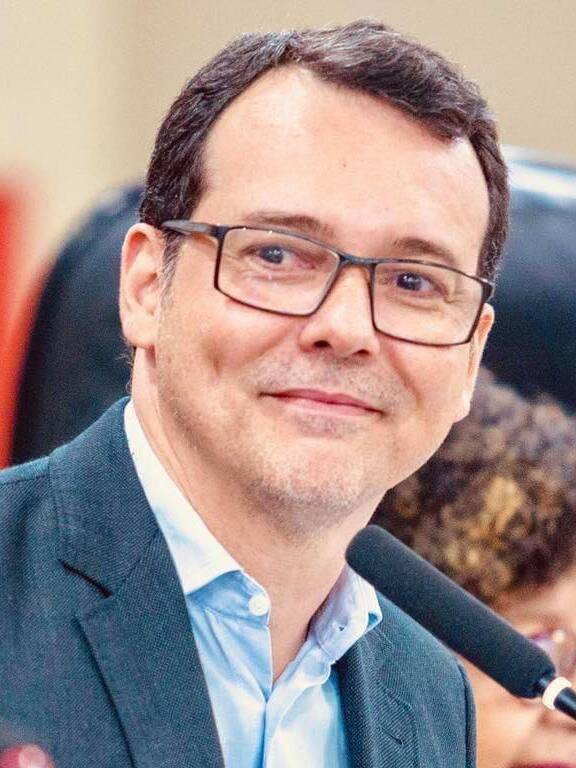
Nominee	Abilio Brunini	Lúdio Cabral
Party	PL	PT
Alliance	Rescuing; Cuiabá	Courage and Force to Change
Running mate	Coronel Vânia	Rafaela Fávaro
Popular vote	171,324	147,127
Percentage	53.80%	46.20%
Mayor before election
Emanuel Pinheiro
MDB
Elected mayor
Abilio Brunini
PL
- Parliamentary election
Party	Leader	Vote %	Seats	+/–
Municipal Chamber
PL	Samantha Iris		4	+4
PSB	Ilde Taques		4	+3
FE Brasil	Alex Rodrigues		3	−3
UNIÃO	Cezinha Nascimento		3	+1
Republicanos	Maysa Leão		3	+1
PODE	Doctora Mara		2	−1
Solidarity	Adevair Cabral		2	+1
PSDB-Cidadania	Maria Avalone		2	−2
PP	Demilson Nogueira		1	−1
MDB	Marcrean Santos		1	0
DEMOCRATA	Wilson Kero Kero		1	+1
PSD	Jeferson Siqueira		1	0
PRD	None		0	−2
This lists parties that won seats. See the complete results below.

The 2024 Cuiabá municipal election took place in the city of Cuiabá, Brazil on 6 October 2024. Voters elected and 25 councillors. A second round was held on October 27 as no candidate achieved 50% in the first round for mayor.

Abilio Brunini, a Liberal Party Federal Deputy, was elected in the second round against Lúdio Cabral, a Workers' Party State Deputy. Cabral overpreformed Lula by 7.7% compared to the 2022 Brazilian presidential election against Jair Bolsonaro.

The incumbent mayor is Emanuel Pinheiro of the Brazilian Democratic Movement. Pinheiro was elected to his second term in 2020 against Brunini meaning he was not able to run for reelection.

Eduardo Botelho of the Brazil Union, the candidate of governor Mauro Mendes, and Domingos Kennedy of the MDB, the candidate of Pinheiro, were defeated in the first round.

== Electoral calendar ==
Electoral calendar announced by the Superior Electoral Court (TSE) on 3 January 2024
7 March – 5 April	Period of the 'party window' for councillors. During this period, the councillors are able to move to other political parties in order to run for election while not losing their respective political terms.
6 April	Deadline for all parties and party federations to obtain the registration of their statutes at the Superior Electoral Court and for all candidates to have their electoral domicile in the constituency in which they wish to contest the elections with the affiliation granted by the party.
15 May	Start of the preliminary fundraising campaign in the form of collective financing for potential candidates. During this period, candidates are not allowed to ask for votes and are still subjected to obey the rules regarding electoral propaganda on the Internet.
20 July – 5 August	On this date, party conventions begin to deliberate on coalitions and choose candidates for mayors and councillors tickets. Parties have until 15 August to register their names with the Brazilian Election Justice.
16 August	Beginning of electoral campaigns on an equal basis, with any advertising or demonstration explicitly requesting for votes before the date being considered irregular and subject to fines.
30 August –3 October	Broadcasting of free electoral propaganda on radio and television.
6 October	Date of mayoral elections.
27 October	Date of a possible second round in cities with more than 200,000 voters in which the most voted candidate for mayor has not reached 50% of the valid votes.

== Candidates ==
=== Candidates in runoff ===
Party	Mayoral Candidate	Party	Vice-Mayoral Candidate	Coalition	Ref
Liberal Party (PL 22)	Abilio Brunini: Federal Deputy (2023–present); Councillor of Cuiabá (2017–2021)	New Party (NOVO)	Coronel Vânia: Military policewoman	Rescuing Cuiabá PL, NOVO, PRTB and DC	
Workers' Party (PT 13)	Lúdio Cabral: State Deputy (2019–present); Councillor of Cuiabá (2005–2012)	Social Democratic Party (PSD )	Rafaela Fávaro: Journalist and Writer; Daughter of Minister of Agriculture Carlos Fávaro	Courage and Strength to Change FE Brasil ( PT, PCdoB, and PV), PSD and Fed. PSOL REDE (PSOL, REDE)	

=== Candidates failing to make runoff ===
Party	Mayoral Candidate	Party	Vice-Mayoral Candidate	Coalition	Ref
Brazil Union (UNIÃO 44)	Eduardo Botelho: President of the Legislative Assembly of Mato Grosso (2017–present); State Deputy (2015–present)	Republicans (REP )	Dr. Marcelo Sandrin: Doctor	Together for Cuiabá UNIÃO, Republicans, PP, PODE, PMB, PSB, Solidarity and Always Forward (PSDB, Citizenship)	
Brazilian Democratic Movement (MDB 15)	Kennedy: Businessman	Democratic Labour Party (PDT )	Miriam Calazans: Manager	For the Love of Cuiabá MDB and PDT	

== Results ==
=== First round ===
Popular vote (first round)
Abilio	39.61%
Lúdio	28.31%
Botelho	27.77%
Kennedy	4.77%

=== Second round ===
Candidate	Running mate	Party	First round		Second round	
Candidate	Running mate	Party	Votes	%	Votes	%
Abilio	Coronel Vânia (NOVO)	PL	126,944	39.61	171,324	53.80
Lúdio	Rafaela Fávaro (PSD)	PT	90,719	28.31	147,127	46.20
Botelho	Dr. Marcelo (REP)	UNIÃO	88,977	27.77		
Kennedy	Miriam Calazans(PDT)	MDB	13,805	4.31		
Total			320,445	100.00	318,451	100.00
Valid votes			320,445	93.46	318,451	96.34
Invalid votes			12,551	3.66	7,234	2.19
Blank votes			9,888	2.88	4,852	1.47
Total votes			342,884	100.00	330,537	100.00
Registered voters/turnout			445,070	77.04	445,070	74.27
