= 2020 Mato Grosso senatorial special election =

Special Senate election in Brazil

2020 Brazilian Senate special election in Mato Grosso
- 15 November 2020
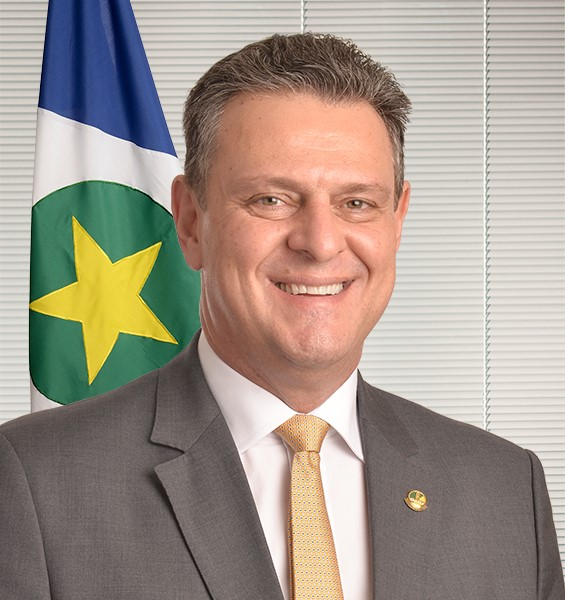

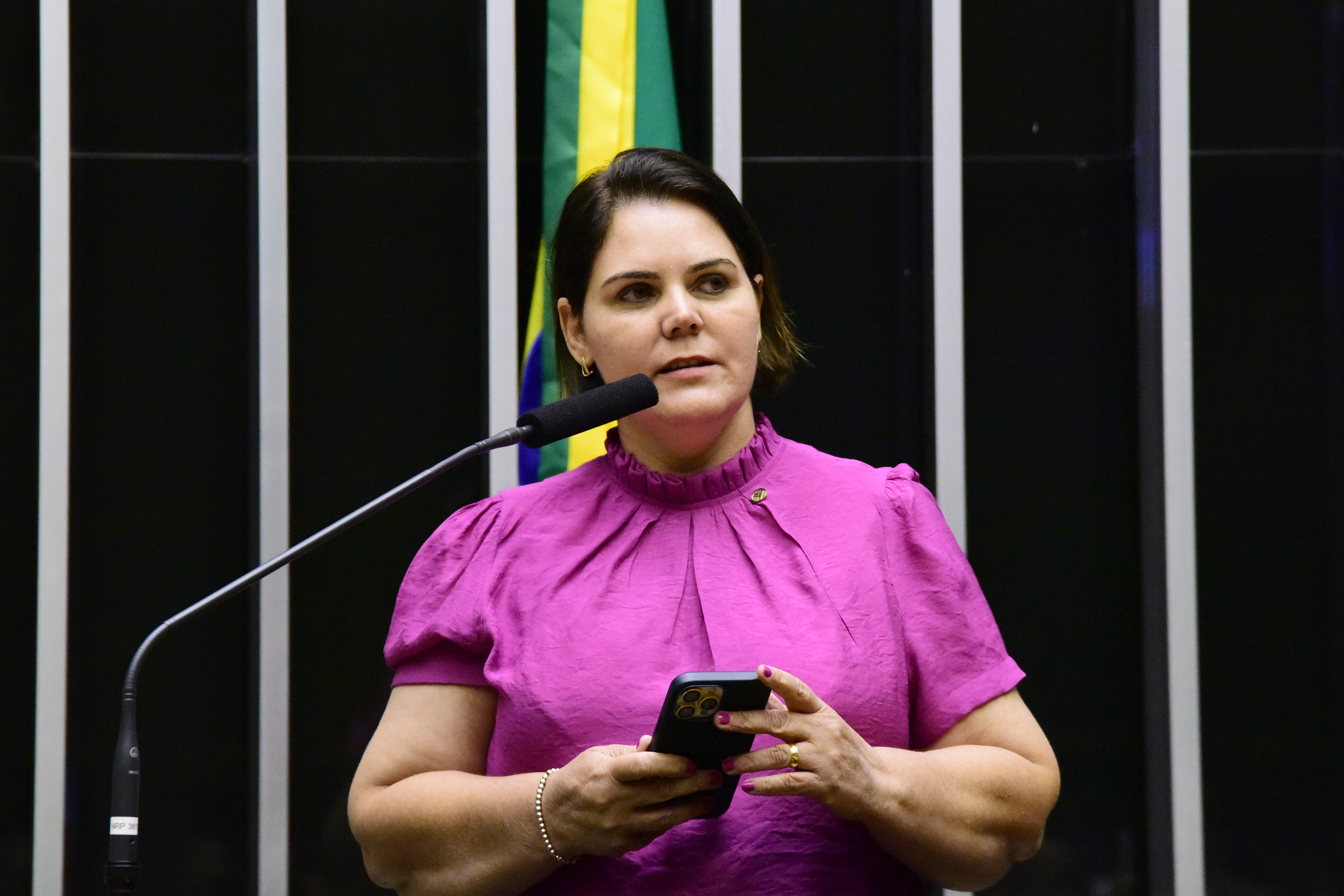
Candidate	Carlos Fávaro	Coronel Fernanda
Party	PSD	Patriota
Popular vote	371,857	293,362
Percentage	25.97%	20.49%
Senator before election
Carlos Fávaro
PSD
Elected Senator
Carlos Fávaro
PSD

A special election for the Brazilian Senate in Mato Grosso took place on 15 November 2020, to fill a vacancy in the Federal Senate through the end of the term ending on 1 February 2027, arising from the expelling of Selma Arruda from the upper house after a trial in the Superior Electoral Court.

== History ==
On 10 December 2019, the Superior Electoral Court considered valid the repeal of senator Selma Arruda term, along with her substitutes, elect in 2018. The former judge was accused of omitting expenses of R$ 1.2 million (US$ 328,425.2, as of 2018) in her electoral campaign to fill one of the two seats available and represent the state of Mato Grosso in the Senate, configuring supposed slush funds and abuse of economic power. It is necessary a bureaucratic act from the Senate Director Board to fulfill this decision. Selma Arruda could appeal to the Supreme Federal Court, but the appeal, at first, cannot suspend the TSE decision.

After the night of 12 March 2020, all the 12 candidacies were published and registered in the Regional Electoral Court of Mato Grosso.

Senator Selma was officially removed from the Senate on 15 April 2020. The 3rd place of the 2018 Senate election, Cárlos Favaro (PSD), temporarily took office as Senator. The election was postponed due to the COVID-19 pandemic in Brazil.

== Electoral process ==
The election was disputed in a single round, with the most voted declared the winner of the election, regardless the vote percentage.

== Candidates ==
Party	Candidate	Most relevant political office or occupation	Party	Candidates for Alternate Senators	Coalition	Electoral number
Workers' Party (PT)	Valdir Barranco	Member of the Legislative Assembly of Mato Grosso (since 2016)	Communist Party of Brazil (PCdoB)	1st alternate senator: Maria Lúcia Neder	Defense of Life, Education, Land, Labour and Citizenship: Workers' Party (PT); Communist Party of Brazil (PCdoB)	131
Workers' Party (PT)	Valdir Barranco	Member of the Legislative Assembly of Mato Grosso (since 2016)	Workers' Party (PT)	2nd alternate senator: Enelinda Scalla	Defense of Life, Education, Land, Labour and Citizenship: Workers' Party (PT); Communist Party of Brazil (PCdoB)	131
Podemos (PODE)	José Medeiros	Member of the Chamber of Deputies for Mato Grosso (since 2019)	Podemos (PODE)	1st alternate senator: Alexandre Agustin	—N/a	191
Podemos (PODE)	José Medeiros	Member of the Chamber of Deputies for Mato Grosso (since 2019)	Podemos (PODE)	2nd alternate senator: Zósima dos Santos	—N/a	191
Social Christian Party (PSC)	Reinaldo Morais	Entrepreneur and author	Social Christian Party (PSC)	1st alternate senator: Gilberto Cattani	Change Mato Grosso: Social Christian Party (PSC); Brazilian Labour Renewal Party (PRTB)	200
Social Christian Party (PSC)	Reinaldo Morais	Entrepreneur and author	Social Christian Party (PSC)	2nd alternate senator: Neles Farias	Change Mato Grosso: Social Christian Party (PSC); Brazilian Labour Renewal Party (PRTB)	200
Christian Democracy (DC)	Elizeu Nascimento	Member of the Legislative Assembly of Mato Grosso (since 2019)	Social Liberal Party (PSL)	1st alternate senator: Naime Moraes	Now It's the People's Turn: Christian Democracy (DC); Social Liberal Party (PSL)	270
Christian Democracy (DC)	Elizeu Nascimento	Member of the Legislative Assembly of Mato Grosso (since 2019)	Social Liberal Party (PSL)	2nd alternate senator: Marcio Paulo da Silva	Now It's the People's Turn: Christian Democracy (DC); Social Liberal Party (PSL)	270
New Party (NOVO)	Feliciano Azuaga	Economist and university professor	New Party (NOVO)	1st alternate senator: Antônio Carlos Rezende	—N/a	300
New Party (NOVO)	Feliciano Azuaga	Economist and university professor	New Party (NOVO)	2nd alternate senator: Vanessa Tomizawa	—N/a	300
Brazilian Social Democracy Party (PSDB)	Nilson Leitão	Member of the Chamber of Deputies for Mato Grosso (2011–2019)	Democrats (DEM)	1st alternate senator: Júlio Campos	Mato Grosso as Whole: Brazilian Social Democracy Party (PSDB); Democrats (DEM); Liberal Party (PL); Christian Labour Party (PTC)	456
Brazilian Social Democracy Party (PSDB)	Nilson Leitão	Member of the Chamber of Deputies for Mato Grosso (2011–2019)	Liberal Party (PL)	2nd alternate senator: José Márcio Guedes	Mato Grosso as Whole: Brazilian Social Democracy Party (PSDB); Democrats (DEM); Liberal Party (PL); Christian Labour Party (PTC)	456
Socialism and Liberty Party (PSOL)	Mauro César de Barros	State prosecutor	Socialism and Liberty Party (PSOL)	1st alternate senator: Gonçalina de Melo	—N/a	500
Socialism and Liberty Party (PSOL)	Mauro César de Barros	State prosecutor	Socialism and Liberty Party (PSOL)	2nd alternate senator: Wanderley da Guia	—N/a	500
Patriota	Coronel Fernanda	Colonel of the Mato Grosso Military Police	Patriota	1st alternate senator: Victório Galli	My Party is Brazil. Our Mission is Mato Grosso: Patriota; Republicanos	511
Patriota	Coronel Fernanda	Colonel of the Mato Grosso Military Police	Patriota	2nd alternate senator: Luciano Esteves	My Party is Brazil. Our Mission is Mato Grosso: Patriota; Republicanos	511
Social Democratic Party (PSD)	Carlos Fávaro	Senator for Mato Grosso (since 2019)	Progressistas (PP)	1st alternate senator: Margareth Busetti	Do More for Mato Grosso: Social Democratic Party (PSD); Progressistas (PP); Brazilian Democratic Movement (MDB); Brazilian Labour Party (PTB); Green Party (PV)	555
Social Democratic Party (PSD)	Carlos Fávaro	Senator for Mato Grosso (since 2019)	Brazilian Democratic Movement (MDB)	2nd alternate senator: José Lacerda	Do More for Mato Grosso: Social Democratic Party (PSD); Progressistas (PP); Brazilian Democratic Movement (MDB); Brazilian Labour Party (PTB); Green Party (PV)	555
Avante	Euclides Ribeiro	Entrepreneur and lawyer	Brazilian Socialist Party (PSB)	1st alternate senator: Francileide Fontinelle	Forward Mato Grosso: Avante; Brazilian Socialist Party (PSB); Democratic Labour Party (PDT); Republican Party of the Social Order (PROS); Sustainability Network (REDE)	700
Avante	Euclides Ribeiro	Entrepreneur and lawyer	Democratic Labour Party (PDT)	2nd alternate senator: Ernando Cardoso	Forward Mato Grosso: Avante; Brazilian Socialist Party (PSB); Democratic Labour Party (PDT); Republican Party of the Social Order (PROS); Sustainability Network (REDE)	700
Solidariedade	Pedro Taques	Governor of Mato Grosso (2015–2019)	Cidadania	1st alternate senator: Fausto Freitas	We're All Mato Grosso: Solidariedade; Cidadania	777
Solidariedade	Pedro Taques	Governor of Mato Grosso (2015–2019)	Cidadania	2nd alternate senator: Elza Queiroz	We're All Mato Grosso: Solidariedade; Cidadania	777

== Opinion polls ==
Pollster/client(s)	Date(s) conducted	Sample size	Fávaro PSD	Leitão PSDB	Taques SDD	Barros PSOL	Siqueira PATRI	Medeiros PODE	Nascimento DC	Barranco PT	Ribeiro AVANTE	Morais PSC	Azuaga NOVO	Abst. Undec.	Lead
RealTime Big Data/CNN Brasil	7–10 Nov	850	20%	14%	14%	9%	7%	9%	4%	3%	2%	1%	0%	17%	6
RealTime Big Data/CNN Brasil	3–4 Nov	1,050	16%	13%	12%	8%	7%	7%	5%	4%	2%	1%	0%	25%	3%
Ibope	30 Oct–2 Nov	812	13%	13%	13%	9%	8%	7%	5%	4%	2%	1%	0%	24%	Tie
Segmenta/Mega FM	16–20 Oct	1,012	23.17%	14.08%	11.23%	15.33%	13.19%	6.42%	8.02%	3.92%	1.07%	2.50%	0.89%	–	7.84%

== Results ==
Candidate	Party	Votes	%
Carlos Fávaro (incumbent)	PSD	371,857	25.97
Coronel Fernanda	Patriota	293,362	20.49
Nilson Leitão	PSDB	157,504	11.00
José Medeiros	PODE	138,922	9.70
Valdir Barranco	PT	117,933	8.24
Mauro César	PSOL	97,573	6.82
Pedro Taques	Solidariedade	71,368	4.98
Elizeu Nascimento	DC	66,966	4.68
Euclides Ribeiro	Avante	58,455	4.08
Reinaldo Morais	PSC	36,545	2.55
Feliciano Azuaga	NOVO	21,214	1.48
Total		1,431,699	100.00
Valid votes		1,431,699	82.87
Invalid votes		142,936	8.27
Blank votes		152,985	8.86
Total votes		1,727,620	100.00
Registered voters/turnout		2,317,102	74.56
PSD gain from PSL			
