= Carlos Bezerra =

Brazilian lawyer, sociologist and politician

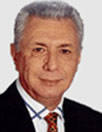

Federal Deputy for Mato Grosso
- Incumbent
- Assumed office 1 February 2007
- In office 1 February 1979 – 1 January 1983

Senator for Mato Grosso
- In office 1 January 1995 – 1 February 2003

Mayor of Rondonópolis
- In office 1 January 1993 – 28 March 1994
- Preceded by: Hermínio Barreto
- Succeeded by: Rogério Salles
- In office 1 February 1983 – 4 April 1986
- Preceded by: Walter de Souza Ulisséia
- Succeeded by: Fausto de Souza Faria

Governor of Mato Grosso
- In office 15 March 1987 – 2 April 1990
- Preceded by: Wilmar Peres de Faria
- Succeeded by: Edison de Oliveira

State Deputy from Mato Grosso
- In office 1 February 1975 – 1 February 1979

Personal details
- Born: 4 November 1941 (age 84) Chapada dos Guimarães, Mato Grosso, Brazil
- Party: PTB (1957–1966); MDB (1966–1979); PMDB (1980–present)
- Spouse(s): Vera Bezerra (divorced); Tetê Bezerra
- Education: Federal University of Mato Grosso

Carlos Gomes Bezerra (born 4 November 1941) is a Brazilian lawyer, sociologist and politician who is a federal deputy from the state of Mato Grosso. Before this, he was a state deputy, governor of the state, and mayor of the city of Rondonópolis. He is currently affiliated with the Brazilian Democratic Movement (MDB).

== Biography ==
Bezerra is the son of Aarão Gomes Bezerra and Celina Fialho Bezerra. He began his political career in student movements and in 1957 founded the Associação Cuiabana de Estudantes Secundários, becoming its president. A lawyer that graduated from the Federal University of Mato Grosso, he became affiliated with the Brazilian Labour Party (PTB) before the establishment of the military dictatorship. After the dictatorship enforced a two-party system in government, he switched his affiliation to the MDB and became a state deputy in 1974, later becoming a federal deputy in 1978, staying with the MDB as it became the PMDB after the reintroduction of a multi-party system in 1980.

Bezerra was elected mayor of Rondonópolis in 1982, but resigned from the position in 1986 to become governor of Mato Grosso. He resigned from that position as well in 1990 to run for the senate, being defeated by Jayme Campos. He was succeeded as governor by Edison de Oliveira. He became mayor of Rondonópolis again in 1992, but once again resigned from the mayoralty in 1994 after he was elected senator, winning against Antero Paes de Barros. He lost reelection in 2002. Afterwards, he once again became a federal deputy, first being elected in 2006.

In 2002, he was awarded the Commander class of the Order of Military Merit by then-president Fernando Henrique Cardoso. In 2004, he was nominated to be president of the Instituto Nacional do Seguro Social (INSS).

Bezerra voted in favor of the impeachment of Dilma Rousseff. He later voted against a similar inquiry towards the impeachment of Michel Temer. In the same term, he voted in favor of both the New Fiscal Regime and the 2017 labor reforms.

Bezerra's current wife, Tetê Bezerra, is a politician who also served as a federal and state deputy in Mato Grosso. She ran as the vice-governor pick for Lúdio Cabral in the 2014 Mato Grosso gubernatorial election. They lost to the ticket led by Pedro Taques.
