= List of governors of Mato Grosso =

Mato Grosso
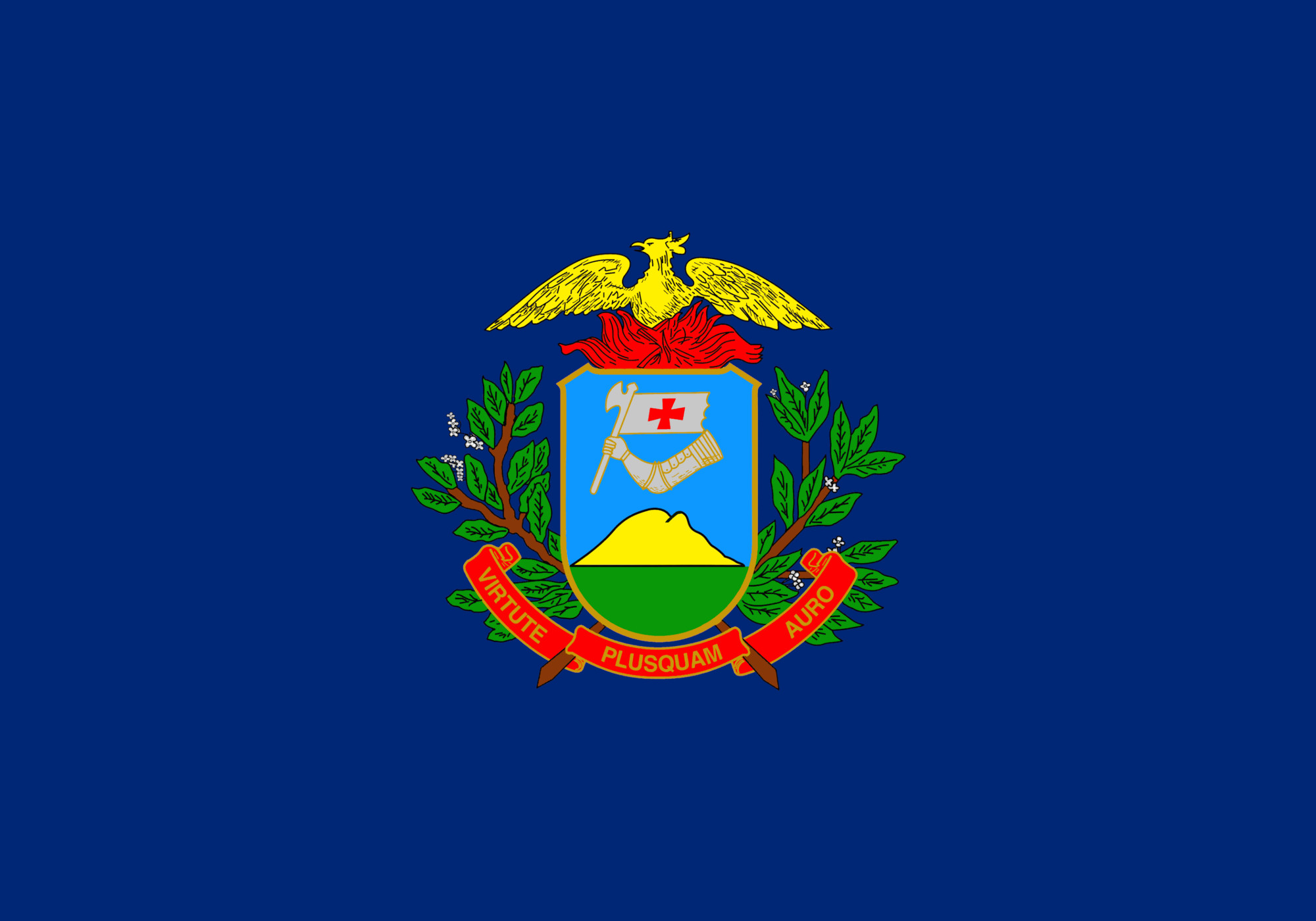
- Governor's flag of the State of Mato Grosso

- Flag of Mato Grosso

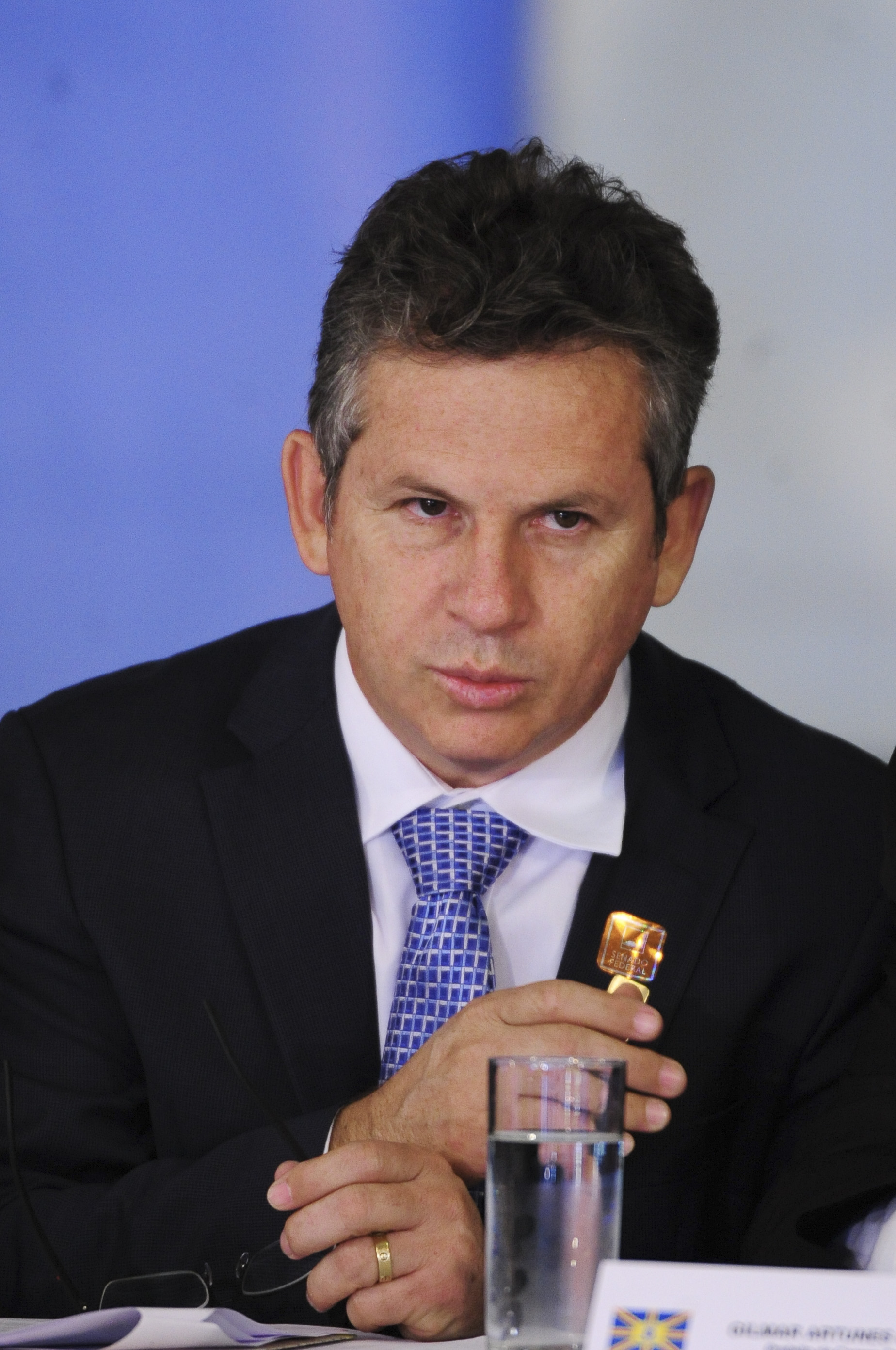
- Incumbent; Mauro Mendes; Acting since January 1, 2019
- Residence: Palácio Paiaguás
- Precursor: Pedro Taques
- Formation: 1889
- First holder: Antônio Maria Coelho

Below is a list of governors of the Brazilian state of Mato Grosso, Brazil.

Order	Name	Term begins	Terms ends	Comments
56th	Mauro Mendes	2019	Incumbent	Governor-elect in universal suffrage on October 7, 2018
55th	Pedro Taques	2015	2018	Governor elected by universal suffrage on October 5, 2014
54th	Silval da Cunha	2010	2014	Vice-governor-elect took over after the resignation of the incumbent Governor re-elected on October 3, 2010
53rd	Blairo Maggi	2003	2010	Governor elected by universal suffrage on October 6, 2002, Governor re-elected on October 1, 2006, and who resigned
52nd	Rogério Salles	2002	2002	Vice-governor-elect took over after the resignation of the incumbent
51st	Dante de Oliveira	1995	2002	Governor elected by universal suffrage on October 3, 1994, Governor reelected to universal suffrage on October 4, 1998, and who resigned
50th	Jaime Campos	1991	1994	Governor elected by universal suffrage on October 3, 1990
49th	Edison de Oliveira	1990	1991	Vice-governor-elect took over after the resignation of the incumbent
48th	Carlos Bezerra	1987	1990	Governor elected by universal suffrage on November 15, 1986, and who resigned
47th	Wilmar Peres de Faria	1986	1987	Vice-governor-elect took over after the resignation of the incumbent
46th	Júlio Campos	1983	1986	Governor elected by universal suffrage on November 15, 1982, and who resigned
45th	Frederico Campos	1979	1983	Governor elected by the Legislative Assembly on September 1, 1978
44th	Cássio Leite de Barros	1978	1979	vice-governor-elect, took office the post of governor due to the resignation of the incumbent
43rd	José Garcia Neto	1975	1978	Governor elected by the Legislative Assembly on October 3, 1974
42nd	José Fragelli	1971	1975	Governor elected by the Legislative Assembly on October 3, 1970
41st	Pedro Pedrossian	1966	1971	Governor-elect in universal suffrage on October 3, 1965
40th	Fernando Corrêa da Costa	1961	1966	Governor-elect in universal suffrage on October 3, 1960
39th	João Ponce de Arruda	1956	1961	Governor-elect in universal suffrage on October 3, 1955
38th	Fernando Corrêa da Costa	1951	1956	Governor-elect in universal suffrage on October 3, 1950
37th	Jari Gomes	1950	1951	Governor appointed
36th	Arnaldo Estêvão de Figueiredo	1947	1950	Governor indirectly elected by the Legislative Assembly
35th	José Marcelo Moreira	1946	1947	Governor appointed
34th	Olegário de Barros	1945	1946	Governor appointed
33rd	Júlio Strübing Müller	1937	1945	Federal interventor
32nd	Manuel Ari da Silva Pires	1937	1937	Federal interventor
31st	Mário Correia da Costa	1935	1937	Governor-elect and Interventor federal
30th	Newton Deschamps Cavalcanti	1935	1935	Federal interventor
29th	Fenelon Müller	1935	1935	Federal interventor
28th	César de Mesquita Serva	1934	1935	Federal interventor
27th	Leônidas Antero de Matos	1932	1934	Federal interventor
26th	Artur Antunes Maciel	1931	1932	Federal interventor
25th	Antonino Mena Gonçalves	1930	1931	Federal interventor
24th	Sebastião Rabelo Leite	1930	1930	Federal interventor
23rd	Aníbal Benício de Toledo	1930	1930	Quartermaster appointed by the federal government
22nd	Mário Correia da Costa	1926	1930	President-elect in universal suffrage
21st	Estêvão Alves Correia	1924	1926	President-elect in universal suffrage
20th	Pedro Celestino Corrêa da Costa	1922	1924	President-elect in universal suffrage
19th	Francisco de Aquino Correia	1918	1922	President-elect in universal suffrage
18th	Cipriano da Costa Ferreira	1917	1918	President of the Legislative Assembly
17th	Camilo Soares de Moura	1917	1917	Vice-president elected in office
16th	Caetano Manuel de Faria e Albuquerque	1915	1917	President-elect in universal suffrage
15th	Joaquim Augusto da Costa Marques	1911	1915	President-elect in universal suffrage
14th	Pedro Celestino Corrêa da Costa	1908	1911	President of State appointed by the President of the Republic
13th	Generoso Pais Leme de Sousa Ponce	1907	1908	President of the Legislative Assembly
12th	Pedro Leite Osório	1906	1907	Vice-president elected in office
11th	Antônio Pais de Barros	1903	1906	President-elect in universal suffrage
10th	Antônio Pedro Alves de Barros	1899	1903	President-elect in universal suffrage
9th	Antônio Leite de Figueiredo	1899	1899	President of State appointed by the President of the Republic
8th	João Pedro Xavier Câmara	1899	1899	President appointed by predecessor
7th	Antônio Cesário de Figueiredo	1899	1898	Governor appointed by President Prudente de Moraes
6th	Antônio Correia da Costa	1898	1899	Governor appointed by President Prudente de Moraes
5th	Manuel José Murtinho	1895	1898	Governor appointed by President Deodoro da Fonseca
4th	João Nepomuceno de Medeiros Mallet	1891	1891	Governor appointed by President Deodoro da Fonseca
3rd	José da Silva Rondon	1891	1891	Governor appointed by President Deodoro da Fonseca
2nd	Frederico Solon de Sampaio Ribeiro	1891	1891	Governor appointed by President Deodoro da Fonseca
1st	Antônio Maria Coelho	1889	1891	Governor appointed by President Deodoro da Fonseca

== See also ==
- List of governors of Mato Grosso do Sul
