= Silvio Favero =

Brazilian politician (1966–2021)

Member of the Legislative Assembly of Mato Grosso
- In office 1 January 2019 – 13 March 2021

Deputy Mayor of Lucas do Rio Verde
- In office 1 January 2017 – 1 January 2019
- Preceded by: Luiz Binotti
- Succeeded by: Miguel Vaz

Personal details
- Born: 31 August 1966 Umuarama, Paraná, Brazil
- Died: 13 March 2021 (aged 54) Cuiabá, Mato Grosso, Brazil
- Party: MDB; PV; PTC; DEM; PODE; PSL

Silvio Favero (31 August 1966 – 13 March 2021) was a Brazilian politician. He served as a member of the Legislative Assembly of Mato Grosso.

== Biography ==
Born in Umuarama, Favero earned a law degree after working as a bricklayer, marketer, and office assistant. In 2018, he was elected as a state deputy for Mato Grosso after earning 12,059 votes. As a deputy, he introduced a bill against compulsory vaccination for COVID-19.

Silvio Favero died of COVID-19 in Cuiabá on 13 March 2021, at the age of 54.
