= List of mayors of Cuiabá =

The following is a list of mayors of the city of Cuiabá, in the state of Mato Grosso, Brazil.

- Amarilio Alves de Almeida, 1909-1910
- Avelino de Siqueira, 1910–1911
- Manoel Escolástico Virgínio de Almeida, 1911–1914
- Alexandre Magno Addor, 1914-1920
- Antônio Manoel Moreira, 1920–1924
- José Antônio S. Albuquerque, 1924–1927
- Fenelon Müller, 1927–1930
- Júlio Müller, 1930–1932
- João Ponce de Arruda, 1932–1934
- Benjamim Duarte Monteiro, 1934–1937
- Álvaro Pinto de Oliveira, 1937–1938
- Isaac Povoas, 1938–1941
- Manoel Miraglia, 1941–1946
- Aquiles Verlangiere, 1946–1947
- Leonel Hugney, 1947–1951
- Manoel Soares de Campos, 1951
- Delphino Santana Rocha de Mattos, 1951–1952
- Manoel José de Arruda, 1952–1955
- José Garcia Neto, 1955–1959
- Hélio Palma de Arruda, 1959–1961
- Aecím Tocantins, 1961–1962
- Vicente Emílio Vuolo, 1962–1966
- Frederico Campos, 1966–1969, 1989–1992
- Bento Machado Lobo, 1969–1971
- Benedito Alves Ferraz, 1971
- José Vilanova Torres, 1971–1975
- Giungihglio Luiggi Bello, 1975
- Manoel Antônio Rodrigues Palma, 1975–1979
- Gustavo Arruda, 1979-1983
- Anildo Lima Barros, 1983–1985
- Wilson Araújo Coutinho, 1985–1986
- Dante de Oliveira, 1986, 1987–1989, 1993-1994
- Estevão Torquato da Silva, 1986-1987
- José Meirelles, 1994-1997
- Roberto França, 1997-2004
- Wilson Santos, 2005-2010
- Chico Galindo, 2010-2012
- Mauro Mendes, 2013-2016
- Emanuel Pinheiro, 2017-2025
- Abilio Brunini, 2025-present

== See also ==
- Câmara Municipal de Cuiabá (city council)
- Cuiabá municipal election, 2012
- Cuiabá municipal election, 2016
- Cuiabá history
- Mato Grosso history (state)
- History of Mato Grosso (state)
- List of mayors of largest cities in Brazil (in Portuguese)
- List of mayors of capitals of Brazil (in Portuguese)
