= Otaviano Pivetta =

Brazilian politician (born 1959)

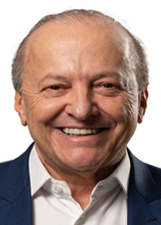

Governor of Mato Grosso
- Incumbent
- Assumed office 31 March 2026
- Vice Governor: Vacant; Gisela Simona (elect)
- Preceded by: Mauro Mendes

Vice Governor of Mato Grosso
- In office 1 January 2019 – 31 March 2026
- Governor: Mauro Mendes
- Preceded by: Carlos Fávaro

State Deputy of Mato Grosso
- In office 1 January 2007 – 31 December 2010

Mayor of Lucas do Rio Verde
- In office 1 January 2013 – 31 December 2016
- Vice Mayor: Miguel Vaz Ribeiro
- Preceded by: Marino Franz
- Succeeded by: Luiz Binotti
- In office 1 January 1997 – 31 December 2004
- Preceded by: Paulo Vicente Nunes
- Succeeded by: Marino Franz

Personal details
- Born: Otaviano Olavo Pivetta; 10 May 1959 (age 67) Caiçara, Rio Grande do Sul, Brazil
- Party: Republicanos (2022–present)
- Other political affiliations: PFL (1996–2000); PPS (2000–2006); PSB (2006–2016); PDT (2006–2016; 2018–2022)
- Children: 6
- Parents: Margarida Gelmina Faccin Pivetta; Tilídio José Pivetta

Otaviano Olavo Pivetta (born 10 May 1959) is a Brazilian farmer, businessman, politician, and former Mayor of Lucas do Rio Verde in Brazil.

Political offices
Preceded by Paulo Vicente Nunes	Mayor of Lucas do Rio Verde; 1997–2005	Succeeded by Marino Franz
Preceded by Marino Franz	Mayor of Lucas do Rio Verde; 2013–2017	Succeeded by Luiz Binotti
Vacant Title last held by Carlos Fávaro	Vice Governor of Mato Grosso; 2019–2026	Vacant
Preceded by Mauro Mendes	Governor of Mato Grosso; 2026–present	Incumbent
