= Tetê Bezerra =

Brazilian politician

State deputy of Mato Grosso
- In office 2011–2015

Federal deputy of Mato Grosso
- In office 2004–2007
- In office 1995–2003

First lady of Mato Grosso
- In office 1987–1990
- Governor: Carlos Bezerra
- Preceded by: Cândida dos Santos Farias
- Succeeded by: Maria Cândida Freitas de Oliveira

Personal details
- Born: Aparecida Maria Borges Bezerra; 20 July 1957 (age 68) Pirajuí, São Paulo, Brazil
- Party: PMDB
- Spouse: Carlos Bezerra
- Children: 1

Aparecida Maria Borges Bezerra, better known as Tetê Bezerra (born 20 July 1957), is a Brazilian nurse, rancher, and politician. She was the first female federal deputy elected from the state of Mato Grosso, having served from 1995 to 2007. She is a member of the Brazilian Democratic Movement Party (PMDB).

== Biography ==
The daughter of Lívio Borges Monteiro and Aparecida Leal Monteiro, Bezerra was born on 20 July 1957 in Pirajuí, in the state of São Paulo. She attended public schools in Pirajuí and an elite girls' school in Lins. She became a government employee in health and later attended college for nursing. She also pursued classes in pedagogy, but did not complete them. After she completed her nursing courses at the Instituto Americano de Lins in 1974, and moved to Campo Grande that same year. She married Carlos Bezerra in 1976, with whom she had a child, Karina.

She began her political career after she married Bezerra, at that time a federal deputy with the MDB. She would also become a member of the party. As Carlos became the mayor of Rondonópolis, Tetê, in addition to becoming the first lady of the city, became municipal coordinator of the Programa Nacional de Voluntariado.In 1986, she became the first lady of Mato Grosso after Carlos was elected governor and went on to become the president of the Fundação de Promoção Social de Cuiabá during her husband's term. Along with this, she became a member of the municipal branch of the PMDB in Rondonópolis, and was the state director and national director of the party.

Bezerra was elected a federal deputy in 1994, and was reelected in 1998, but was elected a substitute in 2002. She returned to the position on 20 January 2004 after then-deputy Rogério Silva was removed. Substituted herself by her husband in the Chamber of Deputies, she was elected a state deputy in 2010, and soon became the state secretary of tourism under governor Silval Barbosa. She ran to become the vice-governor of Mato Grosso in 2014, with the ticket led by Lúdio Cabral, but they were defeated. She was later named National Secretary of Qualification and Promotion of Tourism, a branch of the Ministry of Tourism during the presidency of Michel Temer in 2016.
