= Fiagril =

Company in Brazil

Fiagril Participações S.A.
- Company type: Sociedade Anônima
- Founded: September 14, 1989; 36 years ago in Lucas do Rio Verde, Mato Grosso, Brazil
- Headquarters: Cuiabá, Mato Grosso, Brazil
- Key people: Marino Franz (Chairman); Carlos Enrique Kempff (CEO)
- Products: Soybeans et al.
- Revenue: ▲US$ 791 million (2015)
- Operating income: ▲US$ 11.8 million (2015)
- Number of employees: 700
- Parent: Hunan Dakang
- Website: www.fiagril.com.br

The Fiagril Participações S.A., or Fiagril is a large Brazilian company involved in the soybean industry located in Cuiabá, the capital of Mato Grosso state.
