= Carlos Fávaro =

Brazilian politician

- Official portrait

Minister of Agriculture
- Incumbent
- Assumed office 1 January 2023
- President: Luiz Inácio Lula da Silva
- Preceded by: Marcos Montes

Senator for Mato Grosso
- Incumbent
- Assumed office 17 April 2020
- Preceded by: Selma Arruda
- Succeeded by: Margareth Buzetti

Vice Governor of Mato Grosso
- In office 1 January 2015 – 5 April 2018
- Governor: Pedro Taques
- Preceded by: Chico Daltro
- Succeeded by: Otaviano Pivetta

Personal details
- Born: Carlos Henrique Baqueta Fávaro; 18 October 1969 (age 56) Bela Vista do Paraíso, Paraná, Brazil
- Party: PSD (2015–present)
- Other political affiliations: PP (Before 2015)
- Spouse: Claudinéia Vendramini
- Children: 2
- Profession: Agricultural

Carlos Henrique Baqueta Fávaro (born 18 October 1969) is a Brazilian farmer and politician. In April 2018, he resigned from the office of Vice Governor of Mato Grosso.

== Biography ==
He embarked on a political career after years of work in the agribusiness, where he had become Vice President of the Soy Producers Association of Brazil (Aprosoja Brasil) in 2010 and President in 2012. He had also presided the Agroindustrial Cooperative of Lucas do Rio Verde (Cooperbio Verde) from 2007 to 2011. Fávaro was also delegate in the Soy and Corn Producers Association of Mato Grosso (Aprosoja).

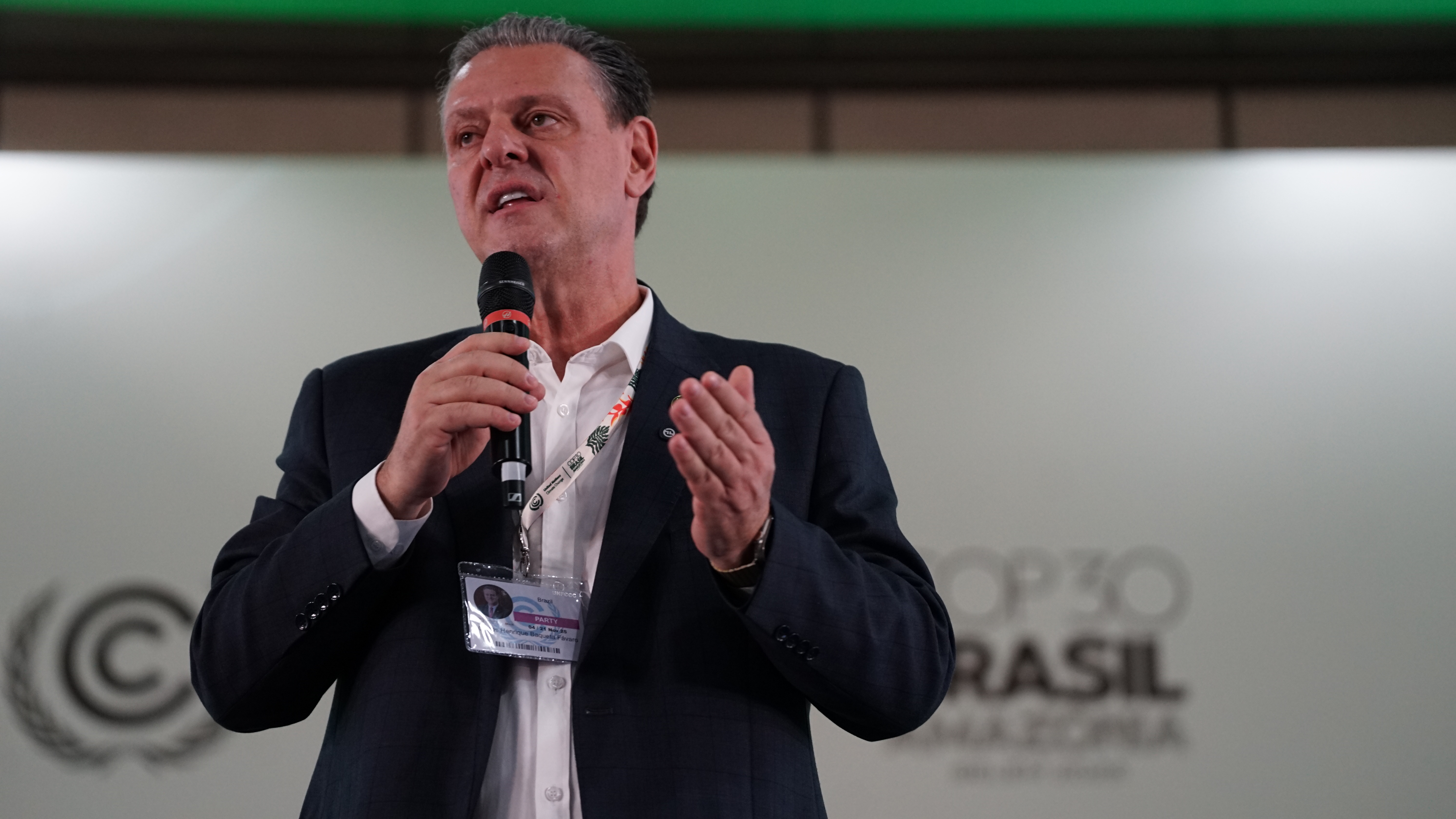
Fávaro at COP30 in Belém, 2025

In the 2014 elections, as a member of the Progressive Party (PP), he was elected Vice Governor of Mato Grosso in the first round, in a ticket led by Pedro Taques (PSDB), receiving 57.25% of the valid votes.

In 2020, after the removal of Selma Arruda from the Federal Senate, Fávaro will temporarily assume her seat as senator. He earned the right to serve the remainder of the term Arruda was elected to serve in, through 31 January 2027, as, in November 2020, he won a special election to the seat she vacated.

Political offices
Preceded by Chico Daltro	Vice Governor of Mato Grosso; 2015–2018	Vacant Title next held by Otaviano Pivetta
