= Our Lady of the Rosa Mystica Church =

Catholic church in Lucas do Rio Verde, Brazil

Our Lady of the Rosa Mystica Church Igreja Nossa Senhora da Rosa Mística

Religion
- Affiliation: Roman Catholic
- Province: Paróquia Nossa Senhora do Rosário de Fátima
- Year consecrated: 2008
- Status: Active

Location
- Location: Lucas do Rio Verde, Brazil
- Interactive map of Our Lady of the Rosa Mystica Church; Igreja Nossa Senhora da Rosa Mística
- Coordinates: 13°02′37″S 55°32′35″W

Architecture
- Architect: Eduardo Perin
- Style: Modernist
- Completed: 2014
- Capacity: 800

Our Lady of the Rosa Mystica Church (Portuguese: Igreja Nossa Senhora da Rosa Mística) is a Catholic church located in Lucas do Rio Verde, Brazil. The church was founded in 2014.
