= Rodrigo da Zaeli =

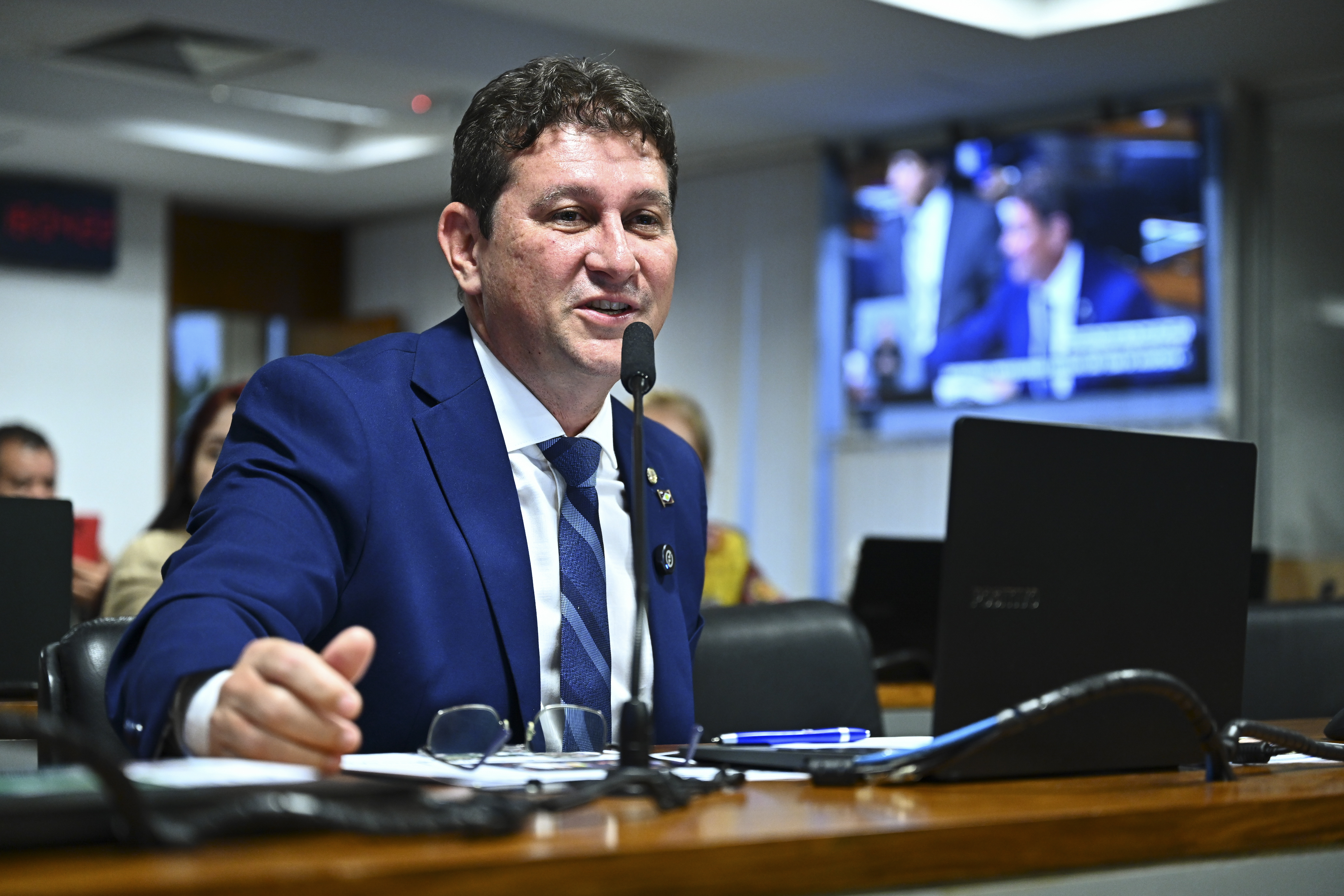
- Rodrigo da Zaeli

Federal Deputy
- In office 1 January 2025 – (running)
- Constituency: Mato Grosso

Personal details
- Born: Rodrigo Lugli; 26 November 1975 (age 50) Umuarama, Paraná, Brazil
- Party: PL

Rodrigo Lugli, better known as Rodrigo da Zaeli (born November 26, 1975, in Umuarama), is a Brazilian businessman and politician affiliated with the Liberal party (PL). He currently serves as a federal deputy for Mato Grosso.

== Political career ==
In the 2022 elections, Rodrigo da Zaeli ran for federal deputy for Mato Grosso, obtaining 6,965 votes and becoming the second alternate of the Liberal party.

He assumed the mandate of federal deputy on January 1, 2025, after the resignation of Abilio Brunini, who was elected mayor of Cuiabá in the 2024 municipal elections.

== Biography ==
Originally from Umuarama, Paraná, Rodrigo da Zaeli is a businessman in the wholesale sector and resides in Rondonópolis, Mato Grosso. He served as a city councilor in Rondonópolis for two terms, standing out in local politics.
