= Buritis Park =

Park in Lucas do Rio Verde, Brazil

- Interactive map of Buritis Park
- Type: Urban park
- Location: Lucas do Rio Verde, Mato Grosso, Brazil
- Coordinates: 13°04′15″S 55°55′06″W
- Area: 330 km^{2} (130 sq mi)
- Created: 2004
- Operator: Secretaria Municipal de Cultura e Turismo
- Open: Open all year

Buritis Park (Portuguese: Parque dos Buritis) is an urban park in Lucas do Rio Verde, Brazil. The Buritis Park is the most visited attraction in the city and the only park of open city stop the public.
