= Eduardo Botelho =

Prominent Politician in the Brazilian State of Mato Grosso

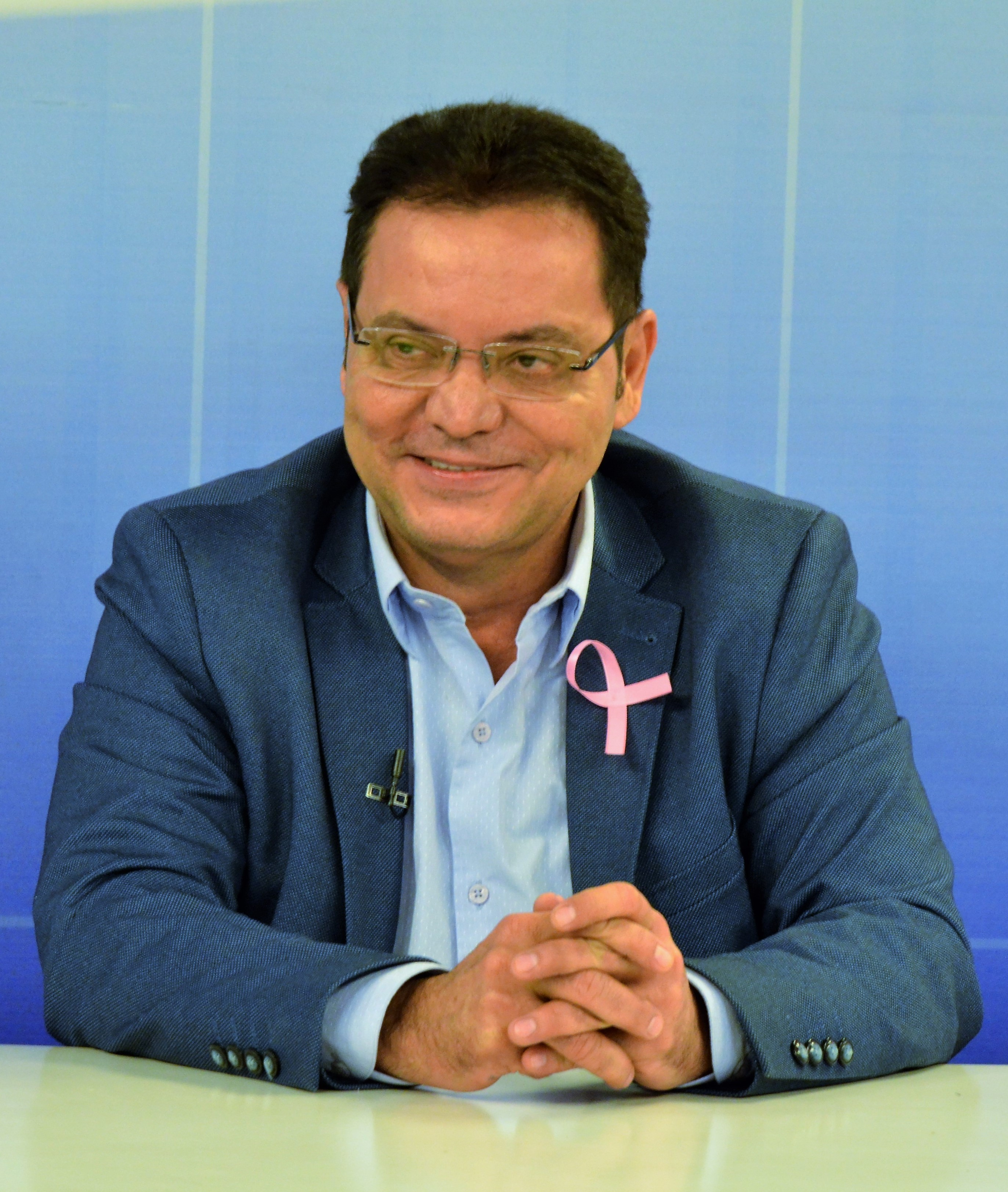

President of the Legislative Assembly of Mato Grosso
- Incumbent
- Assumed office 1 February 2017

State deputy of Mato Grosso
- Incumbent
- Assumed office 1 January 2015

Personal details
- Born: José Eduardo Botelho; 8 March 1959 (age 67) Nossa Senhora do Livramento, Mato Grosso, Brazil
- Party: PSDB (2003–2013); PSB (2013–2018); DEM (2018–2022); UNIÃO (2022–present)
- Education: Federal University of Mato Grosso

José Eduardo Botelho (born 8 March 1959) is a Brazilian electrical engineer, mathematician, and politician, affiliated with Brazil Union (UNIÃO). He has been a state deputy in the state of Mato Grosso since 2015. He has also been the president of the Legislative Assembly of Mato Grosso since 1 February 2017.

== Biography ==
Botelho was born on 8 March 1959 in the city of Nossa Senhora do Livramento.

He graduated with a degree in electrical engineering and mathematics from the Federal University of Mato Grosso (UFMT).

=== Political career ===
As a member of the Brazilian Socialist Party (PSB), Botelho was elected a state deputy from the state of Mato Grosso in 2014. As Botelho went through his first mandate, in 2016, he was elected president of the Legislative Assembly of Mato Grosso (ALMT).

In 2018, he left the PSB to become a member of the Democrats (DEM). He was reelected as a member of the party. That same year, he was accused by Public Prosecutor's Office of using his position to obtain illicit payments in bribes.

With the fusion of the Democrats and the Social Liberal Party (PSL), Botelho became a member of Brazil Union. In 2022, he was reelected with 51,998 votes.
