= Frederico Campos =

Brazilian politician (1927–2021)

45th Governor of Mato Grosso
- In office 1979–1983
- Preceded by: Cássio Leite de Barros
- Succeeded by: Júlio Campos

Mayor of Cuiabá
- In office 1966–1969
- In office 1989–1992

Personal details
- Born: Frederico Carlos Soares Campos; 11 April 1927 Cuiabá, Mato Grosso, Brazil
- Died: 1 March 2021 (aged 93) Cuiabá, Mato Grosso, Brazil
- Party: PFL; PTB

Frederico Carlos Soares Campos (11 April 1927 – 1 March 2021) was a Brazilian politician who twice served as mayor of his hometown, Cuiabá, and also served as the 45th governor of Mato Grosso.

== Biography ==
Campos was the nephew of General Dilermando Gomes Monteiro. He was appointed Mayor of Cuiabá by Mato Grosso governor Pedro Pedrossian, serving from 1966 to 1969. He worked in the government of Governor José Garcia Neto from 1975 to 1978. That year, President Ernesto Geisel appointed him Governor of Mato Grosso, the 45th person to hold the position.

In 1988, Campos won his first election to become Mayor of Cuiabá as a member of the Liberal Front Party, having held the seat 20 years earlier. In 2006, he ran unsuccessfully as a member of the Brazilian Labour Party to the Legislative Assembly of Mato Grosso.

Frederico Campos died from COVID-19 during the COVID-19 pandemic in Brazil in Cuiabá on 1 March 2021, at the age of 93.
