= Lins, São Paulo =

Lins
- Municipality
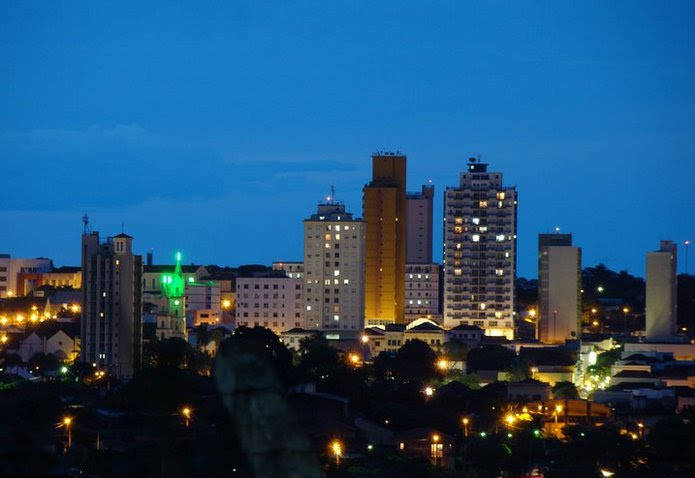
- View of Lins, São Paulo

- Flag Coat of arms

- Location in São Paulo state

- Location in Brazil
- Coordinates: 21°40′43″S 49°44′33″W
- Country: Brazil
- Region: Southeast
- State: São Paulo

Area
  - Total: 570 km^{2} (220 sq mi)

Population (2022)
  - Total: 74.779
  - Density: 131.18/km^{2} (339.8/sq mi)
- Time zone: UTC-03:00 (BRT)
  - Summer (DST): UTC-02:00 (BRST)

Lins is a municipality in the western part of the state of São Paulo in Brazil. The population is 78,503 (2020 est.) in an area of 570 km^{2}. The elevation is 437 m. Distance is 455 km from the state capital, São Paulo.

== History ==
The town was founded in the beginning of the 20th century, at first with the name of Santo Antônio do Campestre, and grew after the arrival of the Estrada de Ferro Noroeste do Brasil (The Northwest railroad of Brazil). It became an independent municipality in 1920, when it was separated from the municipality Pirajuí. It was named after Manoel Joaquim de Albuquerque Lins, who was the president of the state of São Paulo from 1908 to 1912. The name was officially changed from Albuquerque Lins to Lins in 1926.

The city is served by Gov. Lucas Nogueira Garcez Airport.

== Demography ==
Historical population (municipality)
Year	Population	%±
1920	12,692
1940	65,486	416.0%
1950	56,304	−14.0%
1960	47,939	−14.9%
1970	45,555	−5.0%
1980	51,038	12.0%
1991	58,606	14.8%
2000	65,952	12.5%
2010	71,432	8.3%
2022	74,779	4.7%

2000 census

total population: 65.952

- urban: 64.218
- Rural: 1.734
- men: 31.990
- women: 33.962
- population density (inhabitants/km^{2}): 115,42
- child mortality (per thousands): 11,79
- life expectance (years): 73,56
- birth rate (per woman): 1,97
- literacy rate: 92,48%

human development index (HDI-M): 0,724

- HDI-M Renda: 0,782
- HDI-M Longevidade: 0,809
- HDI-M Education: 0,791

(source: IPEADATA)

== Media ==
In telecommunications, the city was served by Telecomunicações de São Paulo. In July 1998, this company was acquired by Telefónica, which adopted the Vivo brand in 2012. The company is currently an operator of cell phones, fixed lines, internet (fiber optics/4G) and television (satellite and cable).

== Geography ==
=== Climate ===
Climate data for Lins, elevation 461 m (1,512 ft), (1995–2010 normals, extremes 1961–1981, 1998–2002)
Month	Jan	Feb	Mar	Apr	May	Jun	Jul	Aug	Sep	Oct	Nov	Dec	Year
Record high °C (°F)	38.9 (102.0)	38.6 (101.5)	39.5 (103.1)	37.2 (99.0)	34.4 (93.9)	33.0 (91.4)	34.7 (94.5)	38.7 (101.7)	41.9 (107.4)	43.5 (110.3)	39.9 (103.8)	39.3 (102.7)	43.5 (110.3)
Mean daily maximum °C (°F)	31.6 (88.9)	31.8 (89.2)	31.9 (89.4)	30.5 (86.9)	26.9 (80.4)	26.3 (79.3)	26.6 (79.9)	29.0 (84.2)	30.3 (86.5)	31.4 (88.5)	32.0 (89.6)	32.2 (90.0)	30.0 (86.1)
Daily mean °C (°F)	26.5 (79.7)	26.6 (79.9)	26.4 (79.5)	24.9 (76.8)	21.4 (70.5)	20.5 (68.9)	20.4 (68.7)	22.3 (72.1)	23.7 (74.7)	25.3 (77.5)	26.0 (78.8)	26.6 (79.9)	24.2 (75.6)
Mean daily minimum °C (°F)	21.4 (70.5)	21.3 (70.3)	21.0 (69.8)	19.2 (66.6)	15.9 (60.6)	14.6 (58.3)	14.2 (57.6)	15.6 (60.1)	17.2 (63.0)	19.2 (66.6)	19.9 (67.8)	21.0 (69.8)	18.4 (65.1)
Record low °C (°F)	12.0 (53.6)	11.2 (52.2)	10.7 (51.3)	6.0 (42.8)	0.7 (33.3)	2.1 (35.8)	−1.0 (30.2)	−2.2 (28.0)	4.6 (40.3)	9.3 (48.7)	10.8 (51.4)	12.8 (55.0)	−2.2 (28.0)
Average precipitation mm (inches)	263.3 (10.37)	213.1 (8.39)	143.3 (5.64)	54.6 (2.15)	53.4 (2.10)	35.2 (1.39)	37.1 (1.46)	27.5 (1.08)	68.0 (2.68)	100.0 (3.94)	129.7 (5.11)	172.4 (6.79)	1,297.6 (51.1)
Average precipitation days (≥ 1.0 mm)	13.3	11.4	7.6	4.1	4.2	3.0	2.4	2.0	5.1	6.8	8.1	10.4	78.4
Source 1: Centro Integrado de Informações Agrometeorológicas
Source 2: INMET

== Infrastructure ==
=== Bus Terminal ===
The Lins Bus Terminal receives around 12 passenger transport companies that connect to the states of São Paulo, Mato Grosso do Sul, Paraná, among others, its lines go to the destinations of São Paulo, Santos, Bauru, Araçatuba, Campo Grande, Três Lagoas, São José do Rio Preto, Curitiba, Londrina, Maringá, Ponta Grossa, Florianópolis, Porto Alegre, Rio de Janeiro, Goiânia, Brasília, among other cities in Brazil.

== See also ==
- List of municipalities in São Paulo
