= Margareth Buzetti =

Brazilian businesswoman and politician

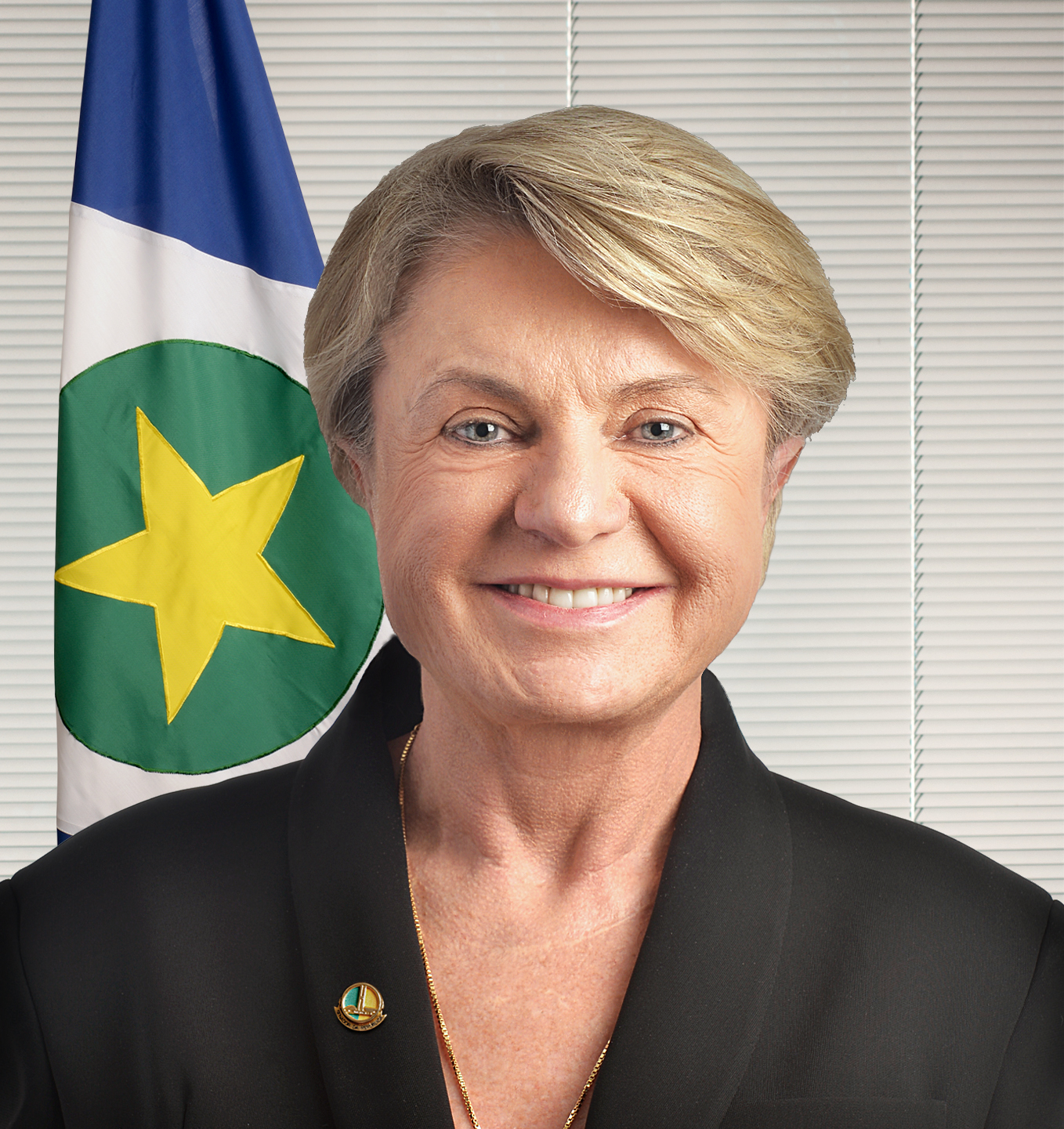

Senator for Mato Grosso
- Incumbent
- Assumed office 2 January 2023
- Preceded by: Carlos Fávaro
- In office 7 June 2022 – 5 October 2022
- Preceded by: Carlos Fávaro
- Succeeded by: Carlos Fávaro

Personal details
- Born: Margareth Gettert Busetti; 31 October 1959 (age 66) Concórdia, Santa Catarina, Brazil
- Party: PP (2017–2022); PSD (2022–present)

Margareth Buzetti (born 31 October 1959) is a Brazilian businesswoman and politician. She has been a senator from the state of Mato Grosso since 2023 as part of the Social Democratic Party (PSD). She is a substitute for Carlos Fávaro, who resigned in order to become the Minister of Agriculture.

Buzetti was born in Concórdia, Santa Catarina. She had served as a senator as Fávaro had previously resigned temporarily for 120 days due to medical leave. Formerly a member of the Progressistas (PP), she left the party in 2022 as Fávaro became a member of president Luiz Inácio Lula da Silva's cabinet. She again became a senator afterwards.
