= Lucas do Rio Verde Airport =

Bom Futuro Municipal Airport Aeroporto Municipal do Bom Futuro
- IATA: LVR; ICAO: SILC; LID: MT0025

Summary
- Airport type: Public
- Operator: Lucas do Rio Verde
- Serves: Lucas do Rio Verde
- Time zone: BRT−1 (UTC−04:00)
- Elevation AMSL: 414 m (1,358 ft)
- Coordinates: 13°02′16″S 055°57′01″W

Map
- Location in Brazil

Runways
Direction	Length		Surface
Direction	m	ft	Surface
08/26	1,730	5,676	Asphalt
- Source: ANAC, DECEA

Bom Futuro Municipal Airport (IATA: LVR, ICAO: SILC) is the airport serving Lucas do Rio Verde, Brazil.

It is operated by the Municipality of Lucas do Rio Verde.

== Access ==
The airport is located 4 km (2 mi) from downtown Lucas do Rio Verde.

== See also ==
- List of airports in Brazil
