= Lúdio Cabral =

Brazilian politician

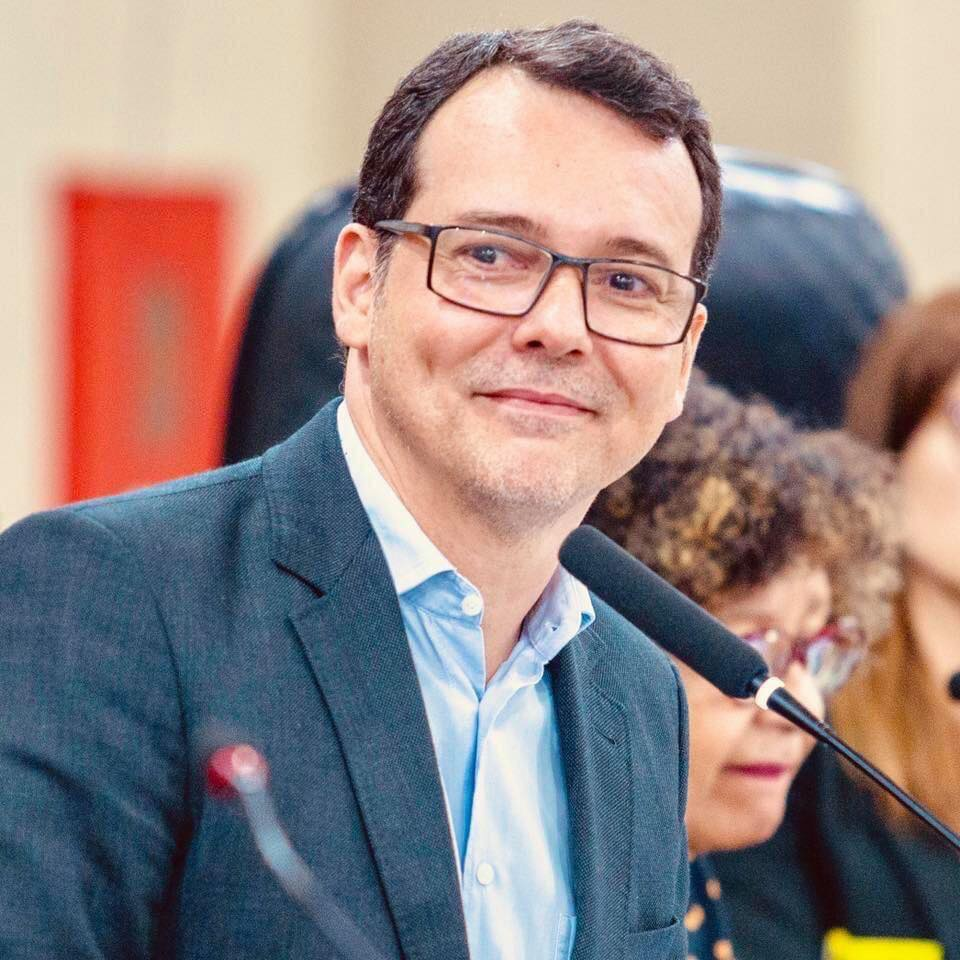

State deputy of Mato Grosso
- Incumbent
- Assumed office 1 February 2019

Councilman of Cuiabá
- In office 1 January 2005 – 31 December 2012

Personal details
- Born: Lúdio Frank Mendes Cabral; 15 March 1971 (age 55) Rio Verde, Goiás, Brazil
- Party: PT (1999–present)
- Education: Federal University of Mato Grosso

Lúdio Frank Mendes Cabral (born 15 March 1971) is a Brazilian doctor and politician. Affiliated with the Workers' Party (PT), he is currently a state deputy in the state of Mato Grosso.

== Biography ==
Cabral was born on 15 March 1971 in Rio Verde, Goiás. He graduated with a degree in medicine from the Federal University of Mato Grosso (UFMT) and did his residency at the Preventive and Social Medicine center at the University of São Paulo's campus in Ribeirão Preto. A public health expert, he is a specialist in the analysis of collective health and the treatment of diseases in the general population. He has always been involved in public health, having working with the Sistema Único de Saúde (SUS). As a public servant in Cuiabá, Cabral was a medical professional in their public primary healthcare network, in communities and in health outposts.

== Political career ==
Cabral began his political career within the student movement at UFMT. He was also the director of the Doctor's Union (Sindimed).

He was elected to his first term as a councilman in Cuiabá in 2004, and was later reelected in 2008, a position he held until December 2012. In 2012, he ran to become the mayor of Cuiabá, advancing to the second round and receiving 140,798 votes. However, he finished in second behind eventual winner Mauro Mendes.

During the 2014 Mato Grosso gubernatorial election, the PT selected him to run as their gubernatorial candidate in Mato Grosso. His vice-gubernatorial pick was Tetê Bezerra. He once again came in second place, with 472,507 votes, with Pedro Taques being elected.

In 2018, he ran to become a state deputy and was elected. He began his term with the Legislative Assembly of Mato Grosso on 1 February 2019. He was reelected in 2022 with 47,533 votes, being the most voted for candidate in Cuiabá.

In 2024, he ran again to become the mayor of Cuiabá. After voting commenced on 6 October 2024, he advanced to the second round against Abilio Brunini of the Liberal Party (PL). He was defeated in the second round.
