= Selma Arruda =

Brazilian politician

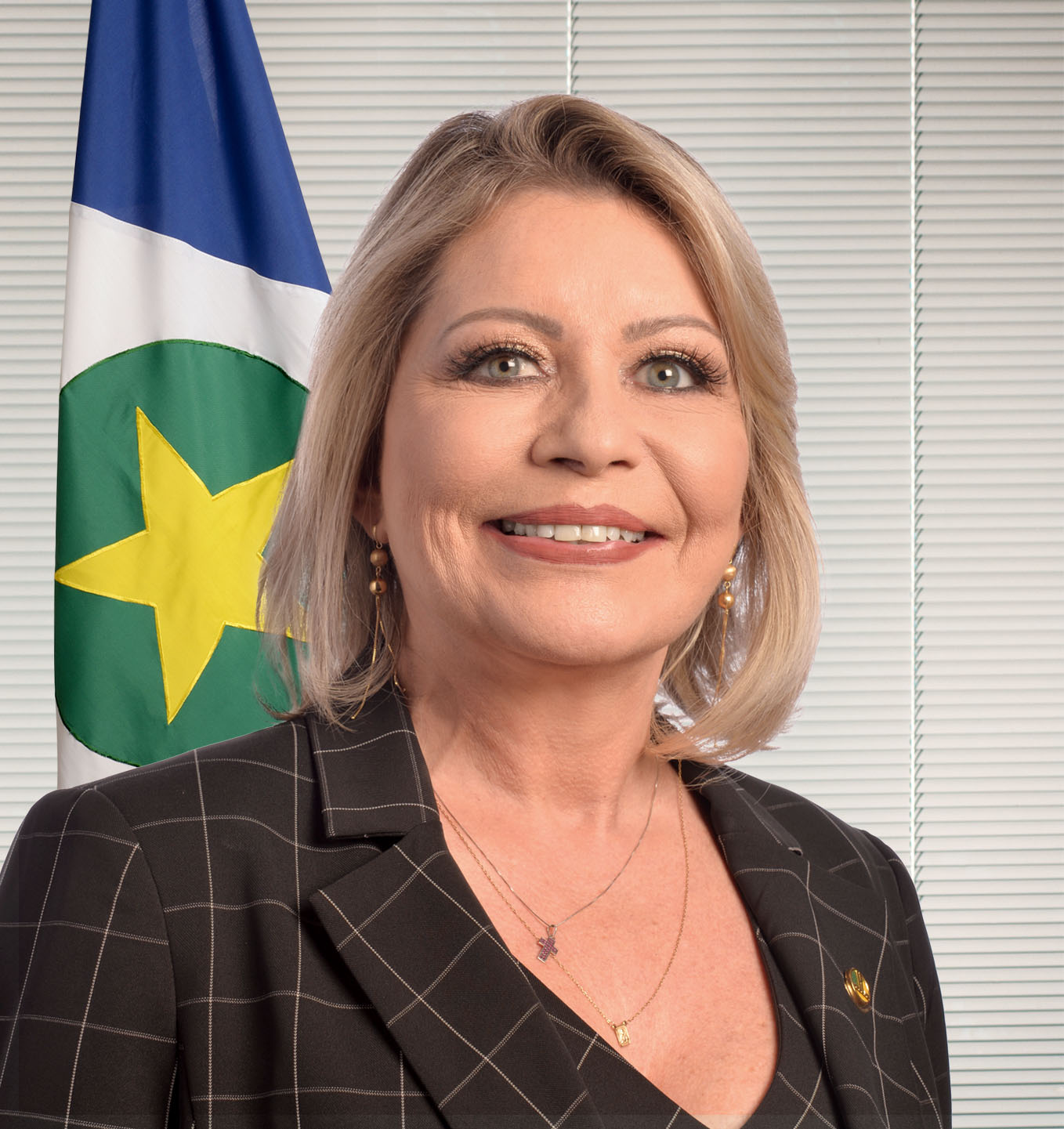
- Arruda in 2019

Senator for Mato Grosso
- In office 1 February 2019 – 15 April 2020

Personal details
- Born: Selma Rosane Santos Arruda; 20 January 1963 (age 63) Camaquã, Rio Grande do Sul, Brazil
- Party: PL (Since 2022)
- Other political affiliations: PSL (2018–2019); PODE (2019–2022)
- Education: UniRitter (LL.B.)
- Occupation: Politician, judge
- Website: www.juizaselmaarruda.com.br

Selma Rosane Santos Arruda (born 20 January 1963) is a Brazilian politician and retired judge. Although born in Rio Grande do Sul, she has spent her political career representing Mato Grosso, having served as state senator in 2019.

== Judicial career ==
Arruda is an alumnus of the Centro Universitário Ritter dos Reis. She served as a state judge in the state of Mato Grosso from 1995 to 2017. Arruda gained fame and notoriety as a judge for her anti-corruption campaign, earning her the nickname "the Moro of Mato Grosso" after Sergio Moro, the head judge of Operation Car Wash. In 2015 she ordered the arrest of former governor Silval Barbosa on corruption charges.

She retired from judicial office in March 2017 after serving as a judge for 22 years. In May 2019 Arruda was awarded the order of merit by the city council of Cuiabá for her fight against corruption.

== Political career ==
In the 2018 Brazilian general election Arruda, along with Jayme Campos, was elected to the national senate from the state of Mato Grosso. Arruda was the most voted candidate in the state of Mato Grosso that election. Strong themes of Arruda's senate campaign agenda included anti-corruption and encouraging private property.

On 10 April 2019 Arruda was unanimously ordered to be dismissed by the Regional Electoral Court of Mato Grosso, rendering her ineligible to serve in public office along with state deputies Gilberto Possamai and Clerie Fabiana. However, the senator can still appeal to the Superior Electoral Court without having to leave the office, while the conviction is questioned judicially. Selma and the others were accused of breaking campaign rulers by hiring irregular advertising before the official campaign began. Arruda said she will appeal the decision in the federal courts. On 10 December 2019 by the vote of 6 to 1, the Superior Electoral Court voted to disqualify Arruda from political office.

On 18 September 2019 Arruda switched political parties and joined Podemos.
