= 2014 Mato Grosso gubernatorial election =

- October 5, 2014
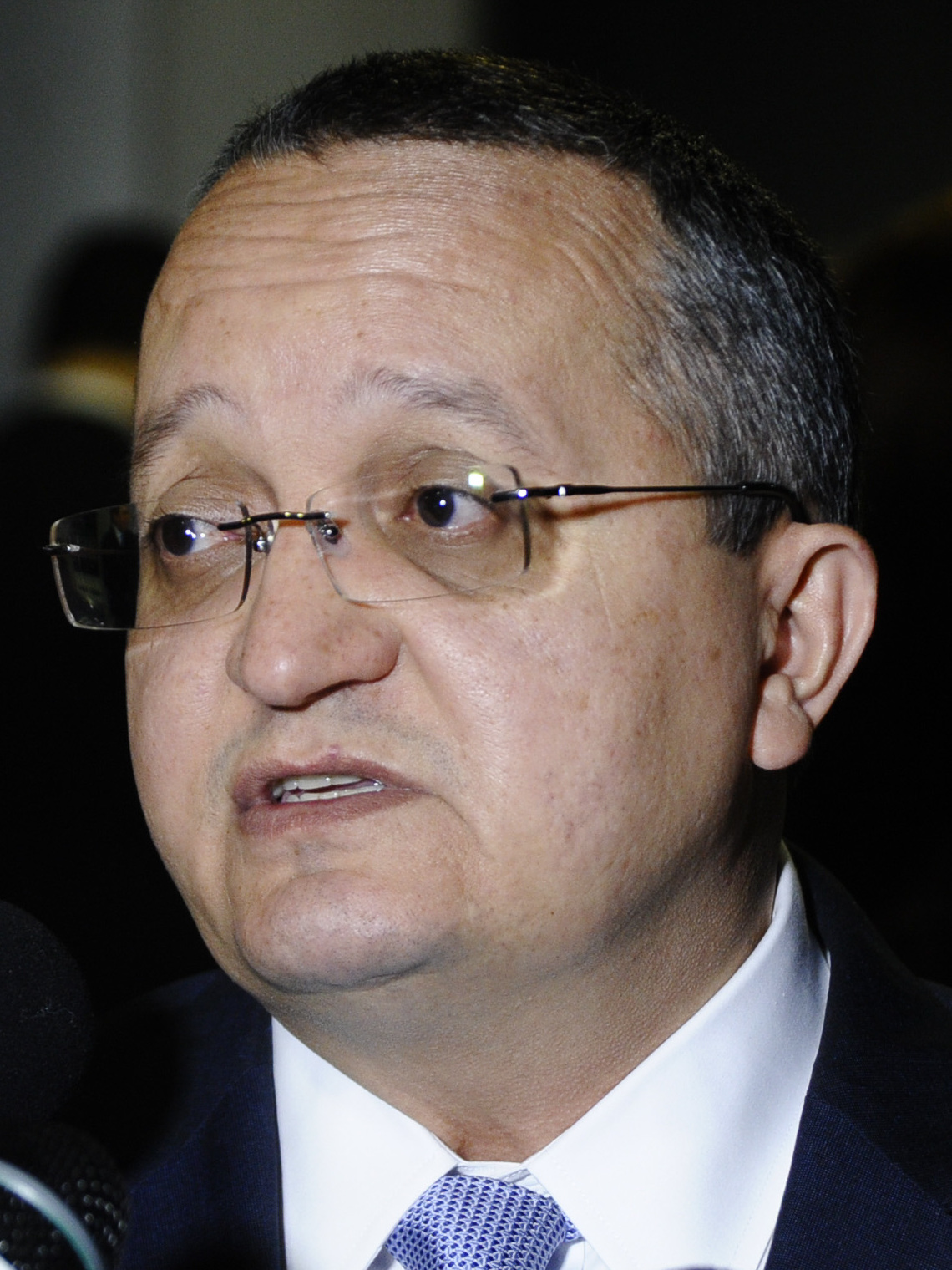
		PT	PSD
Nominee	Pedro Taques	Lúdio Cabral	Janete Riva
Party	PDT	PT	PSD
Running mate	Carlos Fávaro	Tetê Bezerra	Aray Fonseca
Popular vote	833,788	472,507	144,440
Percentage	57.25%	32.45%	9.92%
Governor before election
Silval Barbosa
MDB
Elected Governor
Pedro Taques
PDT

The Mato Grosso gubernatorial election was held on 5 October 2014 to elect the next governor of the state of Mato Grosso. If no candidate had received more than 50% of the vote, a second-round runoff election would have been held on 26 October. Governor Silval Barbosa did not run for a second term. Senator Pedro Taques of the PDT won election to the open seat in the first round.

== Candidates ==
- Pedro Taques 12 (PDT) - Senator from Mato Grosso (elected in 2010)
  - Carlos Fávaro 12 (PP) - agricultural producer; former President of the Association of Corn and Soybean Producers (Aprosoja)
- Lúdio Cabral 13 (PT) - former Cuiabá Councillor (elected in 2004, 2008); candidate for Mayor of Cuiabá (2012)
  - Tetê Bezerra 13 (PMDB) - State Deputy (elected in 2010)
- Dr. José Roberto 50 (PSOL) - lawyer
  - Marco Natale 50 (PSOL) - accountant
- Janete Riva 55 (PSD)
  - Dr. Aray 55 (PSD)

== Results ==
Mato Grosso Gubernatorial Election
Party	Candidate	Votes	%	±%
PDT	Pedro Taques	833,788	57.25%	
PT	Lúdio Cabral	472,507	32.45%	
PSD	Janete Riva	144,440	9.92%	
PSOL	Dr. José Roberto	5,570	0.38%	
Majority		361,281	24.80%	
PDT gain from PT		Swing		
