= Amaggi Group =

Brazilian commodities company

- Type: Privately held
- Industry: Commodities; Agriculture; Logistics; Energy
- Founded: 1977
- Headquarters: Cuiabá, Mato Grosso
- Key people: Judiney Carvalho (CEO)
- Revenue: US$ 9.2 billion (2022)
- Website: https://amaggi.com.br

The Amaggi Group (Brazilian Portuguese: Grupo Amaggi) is a Brazilian commodities company. The company has annual sales of over US$9 billion.

Amaggi was founded in 1977 by André Maggi, an Italian seed producer. In the 1980s, he acquired large tracts of land in Mato Grosso and went into soybean production. He also built the city of Sapezal. After André Maggi's death in 2001, his son Blairo Maggi took over the company. Judiney Carvalho has been its CEO since late 2017.
