= Luiz Binotti =

Brazilian politician and businessman

6th Mayor of Lucas do Rio Verde
- In office 1 January 2017 – 31 December 2020
- Preceded by: Otaviano Pivetta
- Succeeded by: Miguel Vaz

Personal details
- Born: Flori Luiz Binotti; 17 April 1963 (age 63) Campinas do Sul, Rio Grande do Sul, Brazil
- Party: Social Democratic Party
- Spouse: Rafaela Frizzo (1990–present)
- Children: 2

Flori Luiz Binotti (born 17 April 1963) is a Brazilian politician, businessman and the former Mayor of Lucas do Rio Verde, Brazil, having succeeded Otaviano Pivetta on 1 January 2017. Binotti is a member of the Social Democratic Party (PSD).

He was succeeded by Miguel Vaz, Otaviano Pivetta’s former vice-mayor.

Political offices
Preceded by Otaviano Pivetta	Mayor of Lucas do Rio Verde; 2017 – 2020	Succeeded by Miguel Vaz
