= Borrazópolis =

Coordinates: 23°56′S 51°36′W

- Municipality
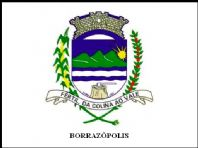
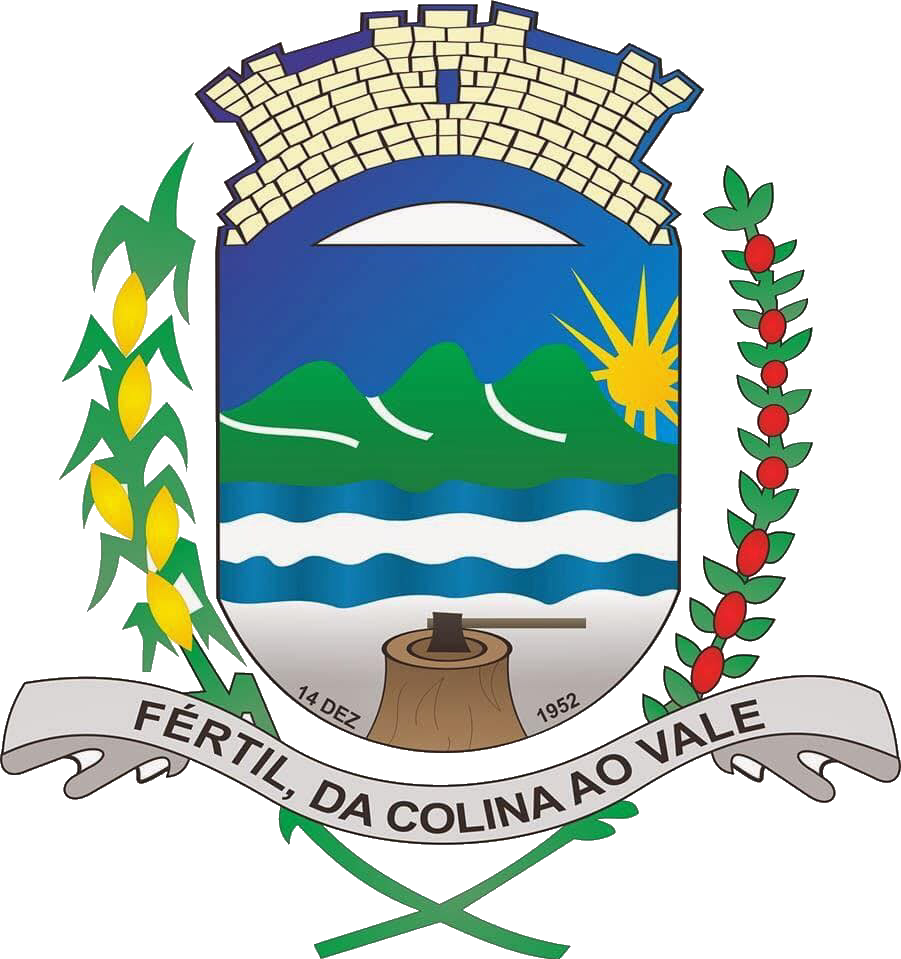
- Flag Coat of arms
- Interactive map of Borrazópolis
- Country: Brazil
- Region: Southern
- State: Paraná
- Mesoregion: Norte Central Paranaense

Population (2020)
  - Total: 6,439
- Time zone: UTC -3

Borrazópolis is a municipality in the state of Paraná in the Southern Region of Brazil.

== Notable residents ==
- Silval Barbosa, Governor of the Brazilian state of Mato Grosso

== See also ==
- List of municipalities in Paraná
