= Emanuel Pinheiro Neto =

Brazilian politician (born 1995)

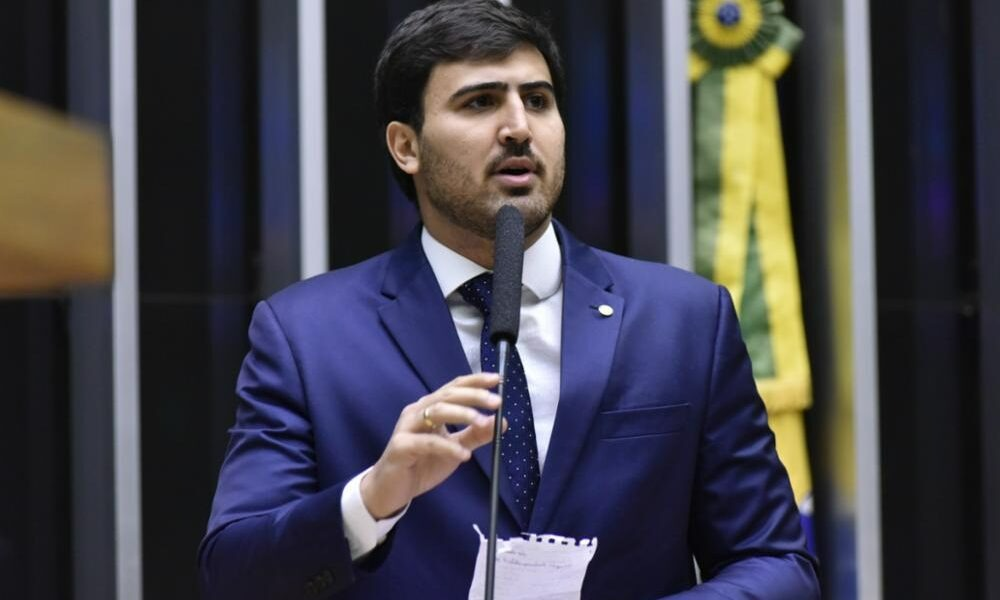

Member of the Chamber of Deputies
- Incumbent
- Assumed office 1 February 2019
- Constituency: Mato Grosso

Personal details
- Born: 5 January 1995 (age 31)
- Party: PSD (since 2026)
- Parent: Emanuel Pinheiro (father)

Emanuel Pinheiro da Silva Primo Teixeira, better known as Emanuel Pinheiro Neto or Emanuelzinho (born 5 January 1995), is a Brazilian politician serving as a member of the Chamber of Deputies since 2019. He is the son of Emanuel Pinheiro.
