= Blairo Maggi =

Brazilian politician

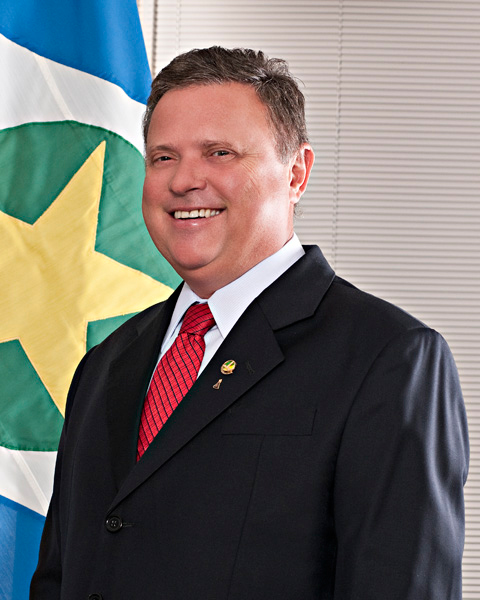

Minister of Agriculture, Livestock, and Supply
- In office 12 May 2016 – 1 January 2019
- President: Michel Temer
- Preceded by: Kátia Abreu
- Succeeded by: Tereza Cristina

Senator for Mato Grosso
- In office 1 February 2011 – 12 May 2016

Governor of Mato Grosso
- In office 1 January 2003 – 31 March 2010
- Vice Governor: Iraci França; Silval Barbosa
- Preceded by: Rogério Salles
- Succeeded by: Silval Barbosa

Personal details
- Born: Blairo Borges Maggi; 29 May 1956 (age 70) Torres, Rio Grande do Sul, Brazil
- Party: PP (2016–present)
- Other political affiliations: PR (2006–2016); PPS (2001–2006)
- Spouse: Terezinha Maggi
- Children: 3
- Education: Federal University of Paraná

Blairo Borges Maggi (born 29 May 1956) is a Brazilian billionaire businessman, and former governor of the state of Mato Grosso.

Maggi owns the Amaggi Group, a large company that harvests, processes, and exports soybeans, and owns soy terminals, highways, and waterways.

== Early life ==
Blairo Borges Maggi was born in Torres, Rio Grande do Sul, Brazil, the son of Andre Maggi, founder of the Amaggi Group. He graduated from Federal University of Paraná, majoring in agronomy.

== Career ==
Maggi is the world's largest soybean producer. His accusers hold him responsible for the destruction of the Amazon rainforest. His defenders say he is taking Brazil forward. In this respect he is unapologetic, telling The New York Times in 2003: "To me, a 40 percent increase in deforestation doesn't mean anything at all, and I don't feel the slightest guilt over what we are doing here [...] We're talking about an area larger than Europe that has barely been touched, so there is nothing at all to get worried about".

Maggi received the Golden Chainsaw Award in 2006 from Greenpeace for being the Brazilian who most contributed to the destruction of the Amazon Rainforest.

In 2015, Maggi's net worth was estimated by Forbes at US$1.2 billion, based on his 16% stake in Grupo Andre Maggi.

== Paradise Papers ==
In November 2017 an investigation conducted by the International Consortium of Investigative Journalism cited his name in the list of politicians named in "Paradise Papers" allegations.

Political offices
Preceded by Rogério Salles	Governor of Mato Grosso; 2003–2010	Succeeded by Silval Barbosa
Preceded by Kátia Abreu	Minister of Agriculture, Livestock, and Supply; 2016–2019	Succeeded by Tereza Cristina
