= Centro Universitário Ritter dos Reis =

University in Rio Grande do Sul, Brazil

UniRitter
- Centro Universitário Ritter dos Reis
- Type: Private
- Established: October 18, 1971
- Affiliations: Laureate International Universities
- Rector: Flávio D'Almeida Reis
- Location: Porto Alegre, Rio Grande do Sul, Brazil; 30.07962°S 51.21932°W
- Colors: Red and White
- Website: www.uniritter.edu.br

The Centro Universitário Ritter dos Reis ("Ritter dos Reis University Center" in English), better known as UniRitter, is a university in Brazil, with two campuses in the cities of Canoas and Porto Alegre, the state capital of Rio Grande do Sul. Through these campuses it serves more than 6,000 students.

UniRitter was founded on October 18, 1971, by the educator Romeu Ritter dos Reis.

In 2010, it became part of the Laureate International Universities network.

== Degree programs ==
=== Undergraduate programs ===
UniRitter offers undergraduate degrees in:

- Business Administration
- International Relations
- Law
- Mechanical Engineering
- Manufacturing Engineering
- Civil Engineering
- Information Systems
- Digital Game Design
- Design
- Architecture and Urban Planning
- Journalism
- Publicity and Propaganda
- Languages
- Pedagogy
- Biomedicine
- Physiotherapy

=== Graduate programs ===
- Business Administration
- Architecture and Urban Planning
- Design
- Law
- Information Systems
- Languages
- Pedagogy
