= Emanuel Pinheiro =

Brazilian lawyer and politician (born 1965)

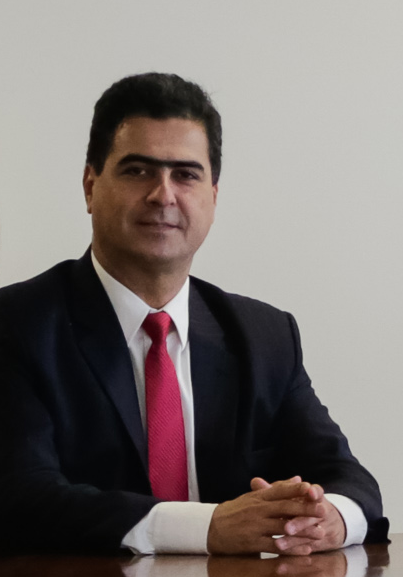

Mayor of Cuiabá
- In office 1 January 2017 – 1 January 2025
- Preceded by: Mauro Mendes
- Succeeded by: Abilio Brunini

State deputy of Mato Grosso
- In office 1 February 2011 – 1 January 2017
- In office 1 February 1995 – 31 January 2003

Personal details
- Born: 12 April 1965 (age 61) Cuiabá, Mato Grosso, Brazil
- Party: PFL (1988–2001); PDT (2001–2005); PL (2005–2006); PR (2006–2016); PMDB (2016–present)
- Spouse: Márcia Khun Pinheiro
- Children: 2, including Emanuelzinho
- Parent: Emanuel Pinheiro da Silva Primo (father)

Emanuel Pinheiro (born 12 April 1965) is a Brazilian lawyer and politician affiliated with the Brazilian Democratic Movement (MDB). He was a city councilor in the city of Cuiabá, as well as a state deputy. He had been the mayor of Cuiabá from 2017-2024.

== Biography ==
Pinheiro is the son of former deputy Emanuel Pinheiro da Silva Primo and Dona Maria Helena de Freitas. He is married to Márcia Khun Pinheiro and has two children.

In 1988, at 23 years old, he was elected to the Municipal Chamber of Cuiabá as a member of the PFL. He was reelected in 1992 with the third highest vote share. In 1994, he was elected as a state deputy, and was reelected in 1998 with more than 14,000 votes.

In 2000, he ran to become mayor of Cuiabá, with Odete Trechand as his vice-mayoral pick. They were not elected. In his reelection run for the state Legislative Assembly in 2002, he was defeated. In January 2005, he became the Municipal Secretary of Transit and Urban Transport under mayor Wilson Santos.

He returned to the Legislative Assembly of Mato Grosso in 2010, elected as member of the Liberal Party (PR) with more than 20,000 votes. He was reelected in 2014.

As a member of the PMDB, he ran again to become the mayor of Cuiabá in 2016 and advanced to the second round against the aforementioned Wilson Santos (PSDB). Pinheiro received 60.41% of the vote in the second round, beating Santos, who had received 39.59% of the vote.

During the 2020 elections, Pinheiro ran for reelection and was reelected with 51.15% of the vote in the second round. He beat Abilio Brunini of Podemos, who received 48.85% of the vote.

On 19 October 2021, Pinheiro was removed from office for supposed irregularities in the Municipal Health Secretary's office. He returned to office two days later, but was removed once again in March 2024.
