= Rogério Salles =

Brazilian politician

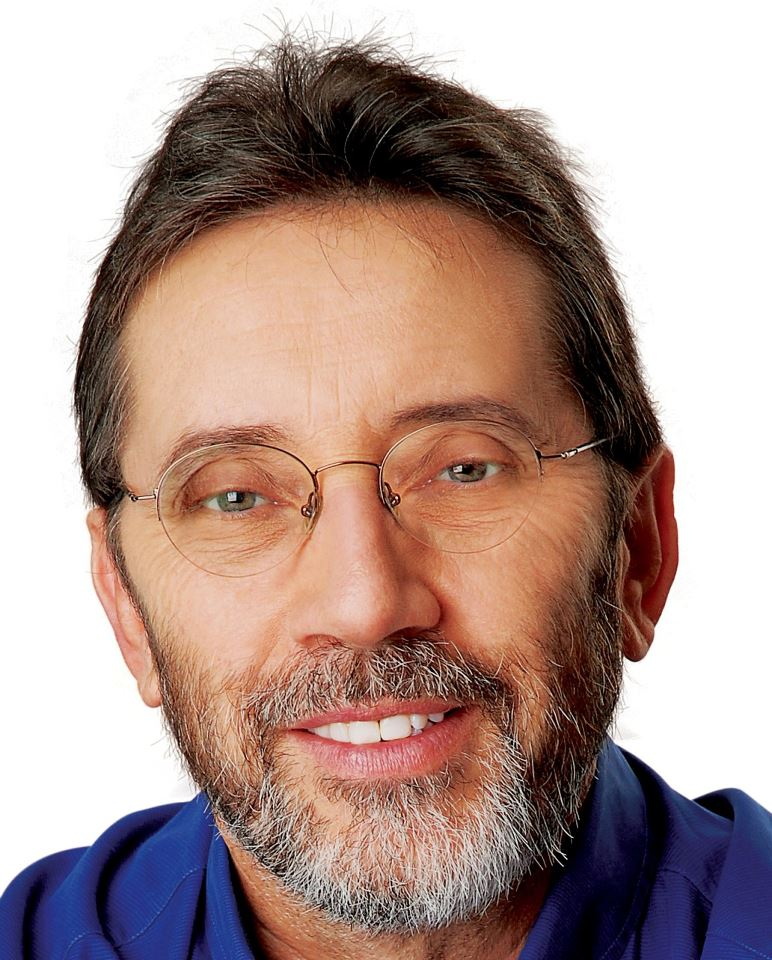

Governor of Mato Grosso
- In office 6 April 2002 – 1 January 2003
- Preceded by: Dante de Oliveira
- Succeeded by: Blairo Maggi

Vice-governor of Mato Grosso
- In office 1 January 1999 – 6 April 2002
- Preceded by: Márcio Lacerda
- Succeeded by: Iraci Araújo Moreira

Mayor of Rondonópolis
- In office March 1994 – 31 December 1996
- Preceded by: Carlos Bezerra
- Succeeded by: Alberto de Carvalho

Personal details
- Born: 18 June 1953 (age 73) Francisco Beltrão, Paraná, Brazil
- Party: MDB (1971–1979); PMDB (1980–1997); PSDB (1997–present)
- Education: Federal University of Paraná; University of São Paulo

José Rogério Salles (born 18 June 1953) is a Brazilian politician who was the governor of Mato Grosso from 2002 to 2003. He served briefly after the resignation of Dante de Oliveira, who himself resigned to run for the Federal Senate. Prior to this position, he was vice-governor under Oliveira from 1999 to 2002, and was the mayor of the city of Rondonópolis from 1994 to 1996. He is a member of the Brazilian Social Democracy Party (PSDB).

Salles graduated from the Federal University of Paraná in 1976 and did specialization courses at the University of São Paulo in 1997. He was an activist against the military dictatorship in student politics during his time at the former, aligning himself with the former Brazilian Democratic Movement (MDB), which later became the PMDB. He was the secretary of Agriculture of Rondonópolis from 1984 to 1985, and later mayor from 1994 to 1996. In 1997, he changed party affiliations to the PSDB and ran as vice-governor of Mato Grosso in 1998, with Oliveira as the candidate for governor. He later assumed the position of governor on 6 April 2002. He was succeeded by Blairo Maggi.
