= Edison de Oliveira =

Brazilian politician (1930–2021)

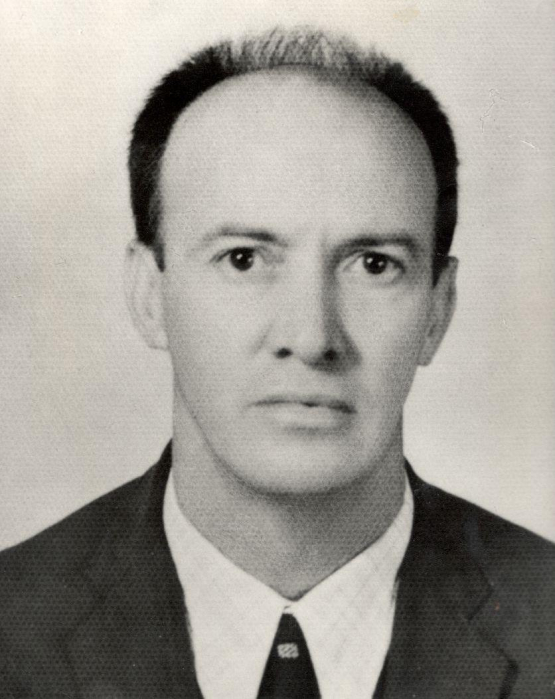

Governor of Mato Grosso
- In office 2 April 1990 – 15 March 1991
- Preceded by: Carlos Bezerra
- Succeeded by: Jayme Campos

Vice-governor of Mato Grosso
- In office 15 March 1987 – 2 April 1990
- Preceded by: Wilmar Peres de Faria
- Succeeded by: Osvaldo Sobrinho

Personal details
- Born: 27 April 1930; Aparecida do Taboado, Mato Grosso, Brazil
- Died: 13 July 2021 (aged 91); Cuiabá, Brazil
- Political party: MDB

Edison Freitas de Oliveira (27 April 1930 – 13 July 2021) was a Brazilian politician who briefly served as the governor of the state of Mato Grosso from 1990 to 1991. He was previously vice-governor under Carlos Bezerra, and assumed the position after Bezerra resigned to run for the federal senate, losing to Jayme Campos. Oliveira died in 2021 in Cuiabá.
