= Mauro Mendes =

Brazilian politician (born 1964)

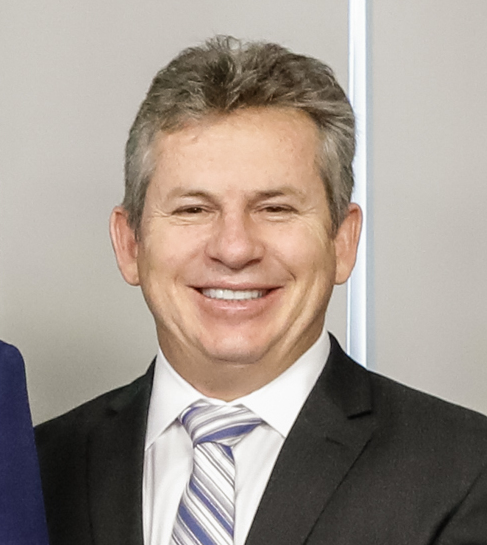
- Mendes in 2019

Senator-elect for Mato Grosso
- Assuming office 1 February 2027

Governor of Mato Grosso
- In office 1 January 2019 – 31 March 2026
- Vice Governor: Otaviano Pivetta
- Preceded by: Pedro Taques
- Succeeded by: Otaviano Pivetta

Mayor of Cuiabá
- In office 1 January 2013 – 1 January 2017
- Vice Mayor: João Malheiros
- Preceded by: Chico Galindo
- Succeeded by: Emanuel Pinheiro

Personal details
- Born: Mauro Mendes Ferreira; 12 April 1964 (age 62) Anápolis, Goiás, Brazil
- Party: UNIÃO (2022–present)
- Other political affiliations: PR (2006–2009); PSB (2009–2018); DEM (2018–2022)
- Spouse: Virgínia Mendes
- Education: Federal University of Mato Grosso

Mauro Mendes Ferreira (born 12 April 1964) is a Brazilian politician. He is the former mayor of Cuiabá and former governor of Mato Grosso, having been elected in the 2018 election and reelected in the 2022 election. In 2026, Mendes was elected Senator, representing the state alongside José Medeiros. He is a member of Brazil Union.

Political offices
Preceded by Chico Galindo	Mayor of Cuiabá; 2013–2017	Succeeded by Emanuel Pinheiro
Preceded by Pedro Taques	Governor of Mato Grosso; 2019–2026	Succeeded by Otaviano Pivetta
