= Coronel Fernanda =

Brazilian politician (born 1974)

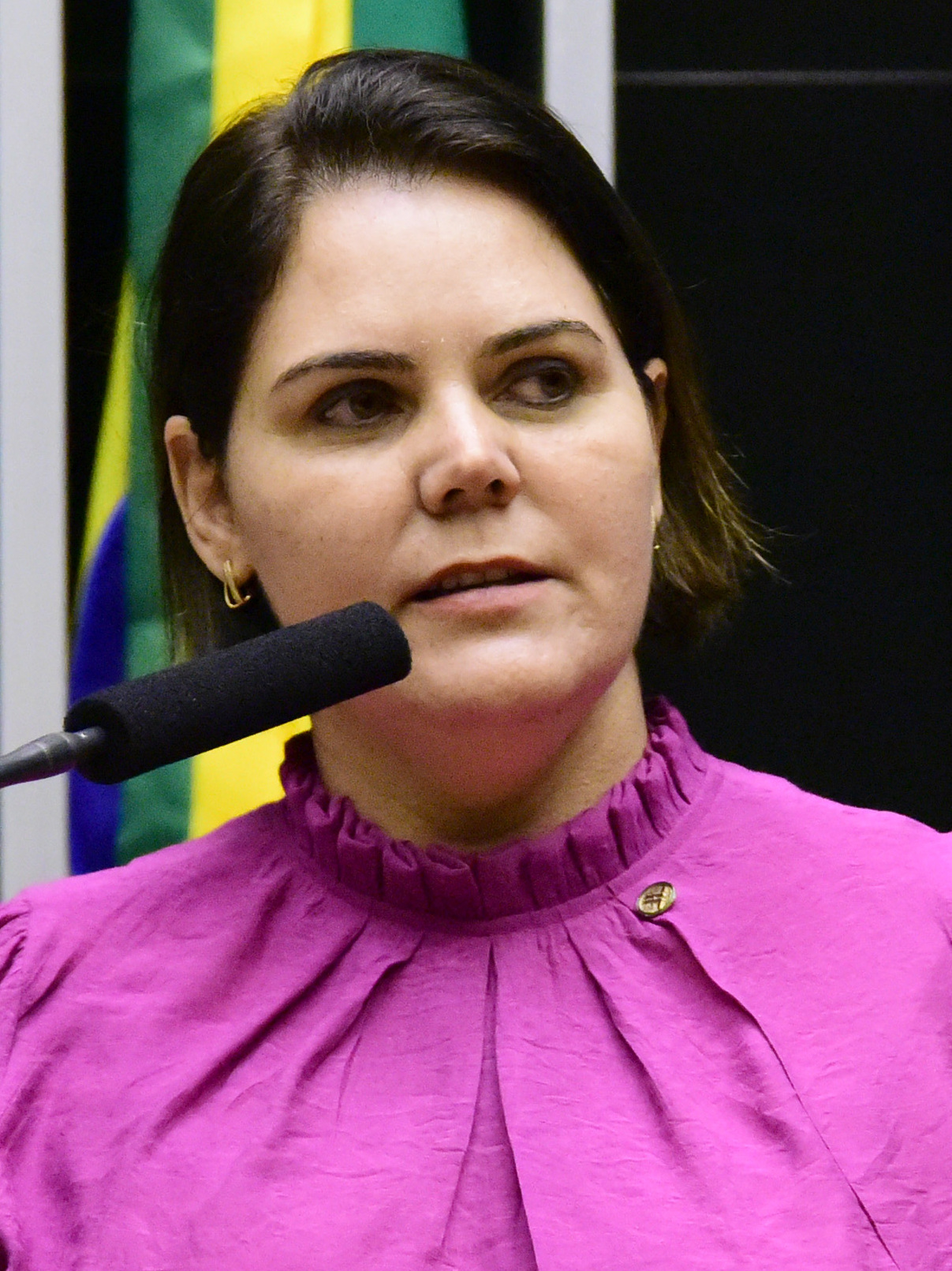
- Fernanda in 2023

Member of the Chamber of Deputies
- Incumbent
- Assumed office 1 February 2023
- Constituency: Mato Grosso

Personal details
- Born: 13 November 1974 (age 51)
- Party: Liberal Party (since 2021)

Rúbia Fernanda Díniz Robson Santos de Siqueira (born 13 November 1974), better known as Coronel Fernanda, is a Brazilian politician serving as a member of the Chamber of Deputies since 2023. From 1996 to 2022, she worked as a military police officer.
