= Jayme Campos =

Brazilian politician

- Official portrait

Senator for Mato Grosso
- Incumbent
- Assumed office 1 February 2019
- In office 1 February 2007 – 1 February 2015

Mayor of Várzea Grande
- In office 1 January 1997 – 1 January 2005
- Preceded by: Nereu Botelho de Campos
- Succeeded by: Murilo Domingos

Governor of Mato Grosso
- In office 15 March 1991 – 1 January 1995
- Preceded by: Edison de Oliveira
- Succeeded by: Dante de Oliveira

Personal details
- Born: 13 September 1951 (age 75) Várzea Grande, Mato Grosso, Brazil
- Party: UNIÃO (2022–present)
- Other political affiliations: PDS (1982–90); DEM (1990–2022)

Jayme Veríssimo de Campos (born 13 September 1951) better known as Jayme Campos is a federal senator of Brazil representing his home state of Mato Grosso. He was previously governor of Mato Grosso from 1991 to 1994 and also served as mayor of Várzea Grande from 1997 to 2004.

== Personal life ==
Campos' father Júlio Campos was also a senator and governor of Mato Grosso as well as mayor of Várzea Grande. Campos is married to Lucimar Campos, who in 2015 was elected mayor of Várzea Grande. Campos had four children, two daughters and two sons: Michelle Campos Soares, Jaime Veríssimo de Campos Júnior, Carlos Eduardo Sacre de Campos, and Gisele Sacre de Campos. His second oldest child, Jaime Jr., died in a car accident in May 2004 while driving home from his sister's wedding.

== Political career ==
Campos was elected to the federal senate for the first time in the 2006 Brazilian general election, winning 61% of the votes. After being defeated in 2015, Campos was re-elected to the federal senate in the 2018 Brazilian general election, along with Selma Arruda from the state of Mato Grosso.
