= Pedro Taques =

Brazilian politician

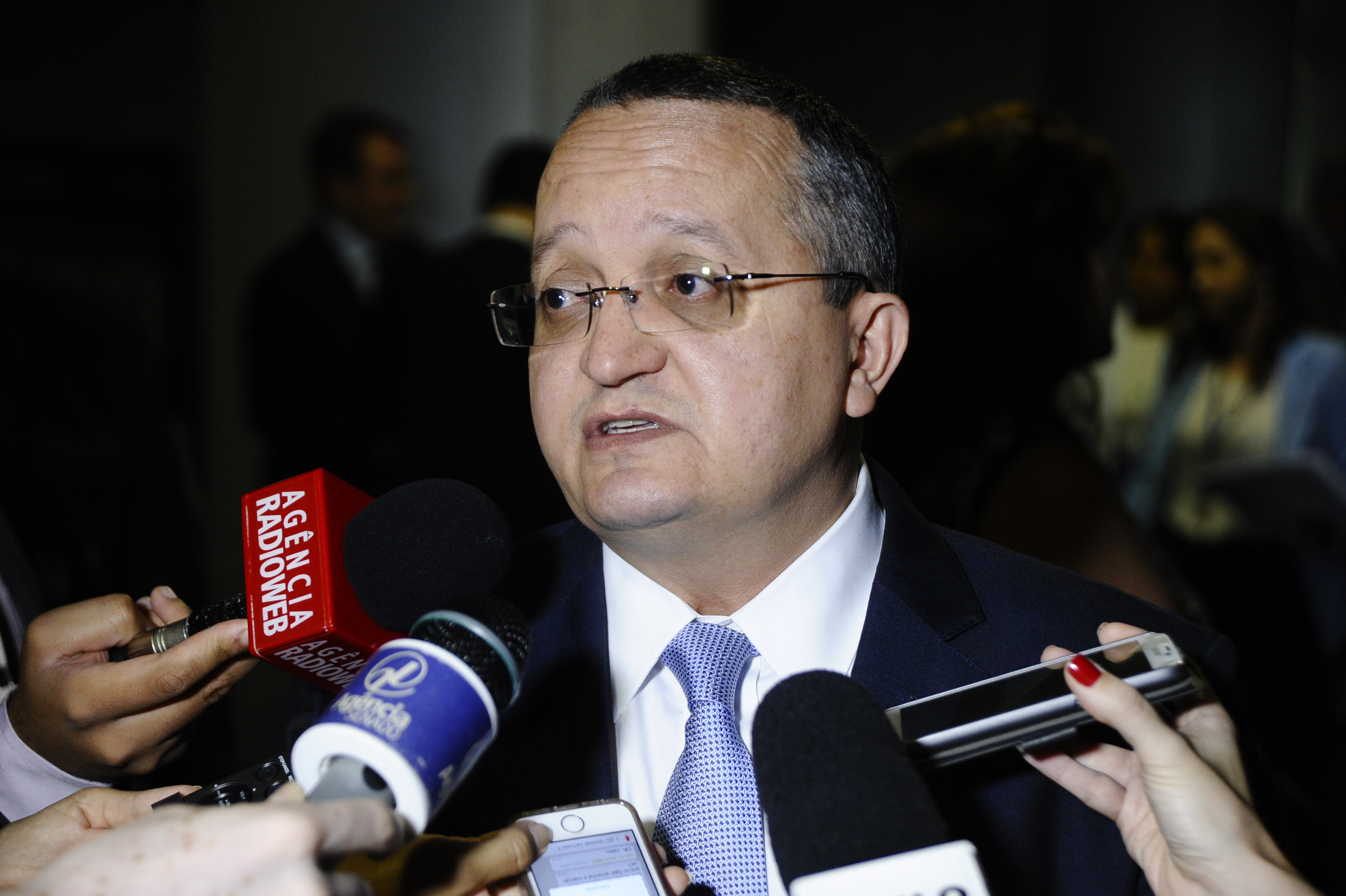

Governor of Mato Grosso
- In office 1 January 2015 – 1 January 2019
- Preceded by: Silval Barbosa
- Succeeded by: Mauro Mendes

Senator from Mato Grosso
- In office 1 February 2011 – 1 January 2015

Personal details
- Born: José Pedro Gonçalvez Taques; 15 March 1968 (age 58) Cuiabá, Brazil
- Party: SOLIDARIEDADE (2020–present)
- Other political affiliations: PSDB (2015–2020); PDT (2010–2015)
- Education: University of Taubaté

José Pedro Gonçalves Taques (born March 15, 1968) is a Brazilian jurist, professor, and politician. He has previously as governor of Mato Grosso and senator for the same state. His ticket won against Lúdio Cabral and Tetê Bezerra in 2014.
