= José Medeiros =

Brazilian politician (born 1970)

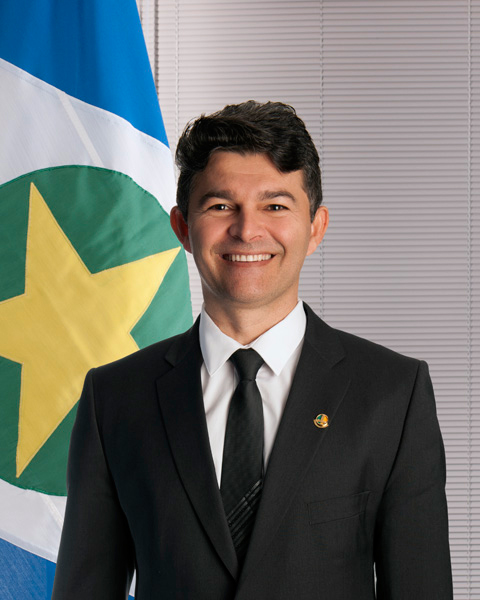
- Official portrait, 2011

Senator-elect for Mato Grosso
- Assuming office 1 February 2027
- In office 1 February 2011 – 1 February 2019

Member of the Chamber of Deputies
- Incumbent
- Assumed office 1 January 2019
- Constituency: Mato Grosso

Personal details
- Born: José Antonio Medeiros; 19 March 1970 (age 56) Caicó, Rio Grande do Norte, Brazil
- Party: PL (since 2022)
- Other political affiliations: PPS (2001–2016); PSD (2016–2017); PODE (2017–2022)
- Profession: Federal highway police officer

José Antonio Medeiros (born 19 March 1970) is a Brazilian politician. He had represented Mato Grosso in the Federal Senate from 2015 to 2019 and is currently member of the Chamber of Deputies. He is a member of the Liberal Party (PL).

== Personal life ==
Medeiros is a devout member of the Presbyterian church.

== Political career ==
Medeiros voted in favor of the impeachment against then-president Dilma Rousseff. Medeiros voted in favor of the 2017 Brazilian labor reform, and would later back Rousseff's successor Michel Temer against a similar corruption investigation and impeachment motion.
