= Abilio Brunini =

Brazilian politician (born 1984)

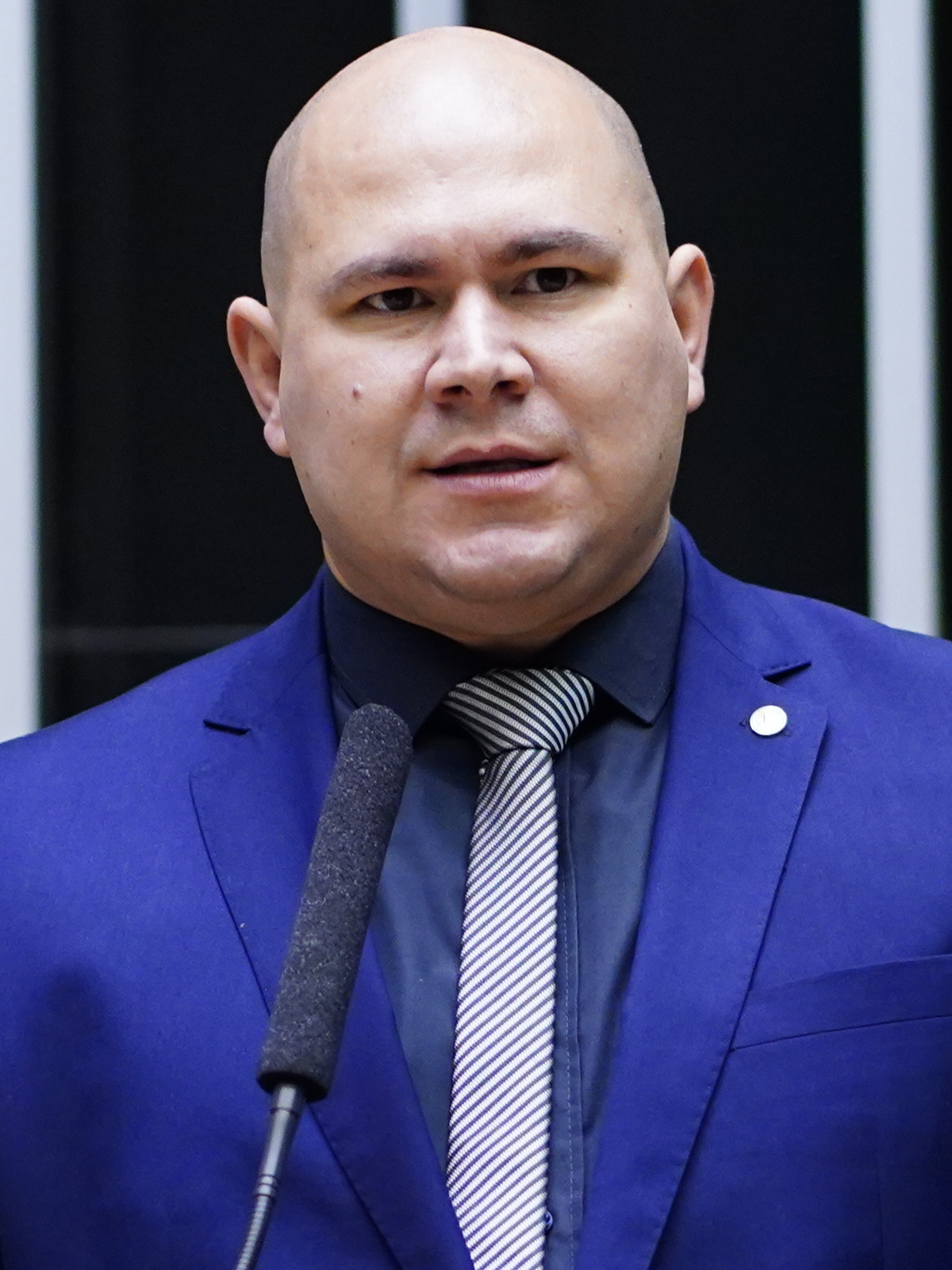

Mayor of Cuiabá
- Incumbent
- Assumed office 1 January 2025
- Vice Mayor: Vânia Rosa
- Preceded by: Emanuel Pinheiro

Federal Deputy
- In office 1 February 2023 – 1 January 2025
- Constituency: Mato Grosso

Councilman of Cuiabá
- In office 1 January 2017 – 1 January 2021
- Constituency: At-large

Personal details
- Born: Abilio Jacques Brunini Moumer; 31 January 1984 (age 42) Cuiabá, Mato Grosso, Brazil
- Party: PL (2022–present)
- Other political affiliations: PSC (2015–2020); PODE (2020–2022)

Abilio Jacques Brunini Moumer (born 31 January 1984) is a Brazilian architect and politician, affiliated with the Liberal Party (PL). He was a federal deputy from the state of Mato Grosso. He is the mayor of Cuiabá and assumed office on 1 January 2025.

== Political career ==
Brunini was first elected as a councilman in Cuiabá, elected in 2016 as a member of the Social Christian Party (PSC). During the 2020 elections, he ran to become the mayor of Cuiabá as part of Podemos and came in first in the first round, with 90,631 votes. He was, however, defeated in the second round by Emanuel Pinheiro (MDB), who was reelected with 51.17% of the vote. In 2022, he was the second most voted for candidate to become a federal deputy in the state of Mato Grosso, with 87,072 votes (5.03%), and was the most voted for candidate in his home city of Cuiabá.

In 2024, he ran again to become the mayor of Cuiabá. After voting commenced on 6 October 2024, he advanced to the second round against Lúdio Cabral of the Workers' Party (PT). The second round occurred on 27 October 2024, with Brunini winning in the second round.

== Controversies ==
=== Comments about the rape of vulnerable people ===
In October 2022, on the Tudo Menos Política podcast, Brunini commented on a rape case involving two minors where he questioned the understanding of the Child and Adolescent Statute's (ECA) provisions about the rape of vulnerable people. He implied that the rape was in fact consensual, and asked what the children watched in order to be able to do this. He later concluded by asking how many mothers had a child at 13 and went on to become adults who were responsible and living their lives. The comments had negative consequences for Brunini after his expulsion from the 8 January CPMI.

=== Broadcast in the Salão Verde on 11 January 2023 ===
Brunini made a live broadcast days after the 8 January 2023 attacks on the capital, claiming that there had not been anything that had been broken and that the Chamber of Deputies building had only suffered minor damage. A woman in the live denied those claims, saying that the hardest hit areas had been the Palácio do Planalto and the Federal Senate building. She later claimed that Brunini had been acting in bad faith, exhibiting only the least damaged areas. The president of the Chamber of Deputies Arthur Lira, said in an interview, without citing names, that there were members of the chamber that were going on to defame and lie with videos claiming that there were lies about the events. He later mentioned that those who spread lies about the events would be held responsible because everyone saw those terrible, violent, and grave scenes.

=== 8 January CPMI ===
Brunini's behavior on the 8 January CPMI, despite not being a member of the commission, had been marked by accusations of intentionally disrupting sessions. His interruptions led to considerations to extend the time for speeches made by pro-government members of the commission.

==== Accusations of transphobia ====
Brunini was accused of transphobia by senator Rogério Carvalho, of the PT, during a speech made by transgender deputy Erika Hilton during a session of the CPMI on 11 July 2023. Brunini had allegedly said that the deputy was "offering her sexual services". Other senators confirmed that they heard Brunini's comments. Legal proceedings were opened with the Ethics Council by the attorney general for "political and gender violence"; however, 4 months later, it was archived. Brunini also used to film his colleagues in the chamber. Arthur Oliveira Maia, the president of the CPMI, had at various points threatened to take Brunini to the Ethics Council on account of behaviors incongruent with other politicians in the CPMI.

==== Accusation of white supremacist gestures and interruptions of speeches ====
On 24 August 2023, during the 8 January CPMI, Brunini made a gesture with his hand that is associated with neo-Nazi movements in the United States and other countries. He had his microphone cut after a series of interruptions and other disruptive behavior during the speech of Duarte Júnior, a PSB politician from Maranhão. After this, he made a gesture that led to accusations of making white supremacist gestures, namely creating a "w" with one hand and a "p" in another. These gestures were allegedly in reference to "white power", specifically to white supremacist and terrorist organizations in the United States such as the Ku Klux Klan. On his X (formerly Twitter) profile, Brunini justified these by claiming he was making references to the length of time of Duarte Júnior's speech. Duarte Júnior had already been interrupted various times by Brunini and that it was to the extent that one of these interruptions led one of the vice-presidents of the CPMI, senator Magno Malta, to become angered and call out Brunini for his behavior.

==== Expulsion ====
After once again disrupting the commission and interrupting speeches of deputies during the session on 26 September 2023, Brunini was expelled by Oliveira Maia from the CPMI, saying that he would forward his name to the Ethics Commission. The session was suspended because Brunini refused to leave the room where the session was being held.

Political offices
Preceded by Emanuel Pinheiro	Mayor of Cuiabá; 2025–present	Incumbent
