= Silval Barbosa =

Brazilian politician

- Silval Barbosa in 2011

Governor of Mato Grosso
- In office 31 March 2010 – 1 January 2015
- Preceded by: Blairo Maggi
- Succeeded by: Pedro Taques

Vice-Governor of Mato Grosso
- In office 1 January 2007 – 31 March 2010
- Preceded by: Iraci França

Personal details
- Born: April 26, 1961 (age 64) Borrazópolis, Paraná, Brazil

Silval Barbosa (Borazópolis, April 26, 1961) is a Brazilian businessman and politician affiliated with the Brazilian Democratic Movement (MDB). He was governor of the State of Mato Grosso between 2010 and 2015 Elected vice-governor in 2006, Silval took over the government following the resignation of Blairo Maggi, who was running for the Federal Senate.
