= Lucas do Rio Verde =

- Municipality
- Município de Lucas do Rio Verde; Municipality of Lucas do Rio Verde
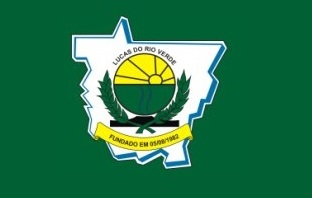
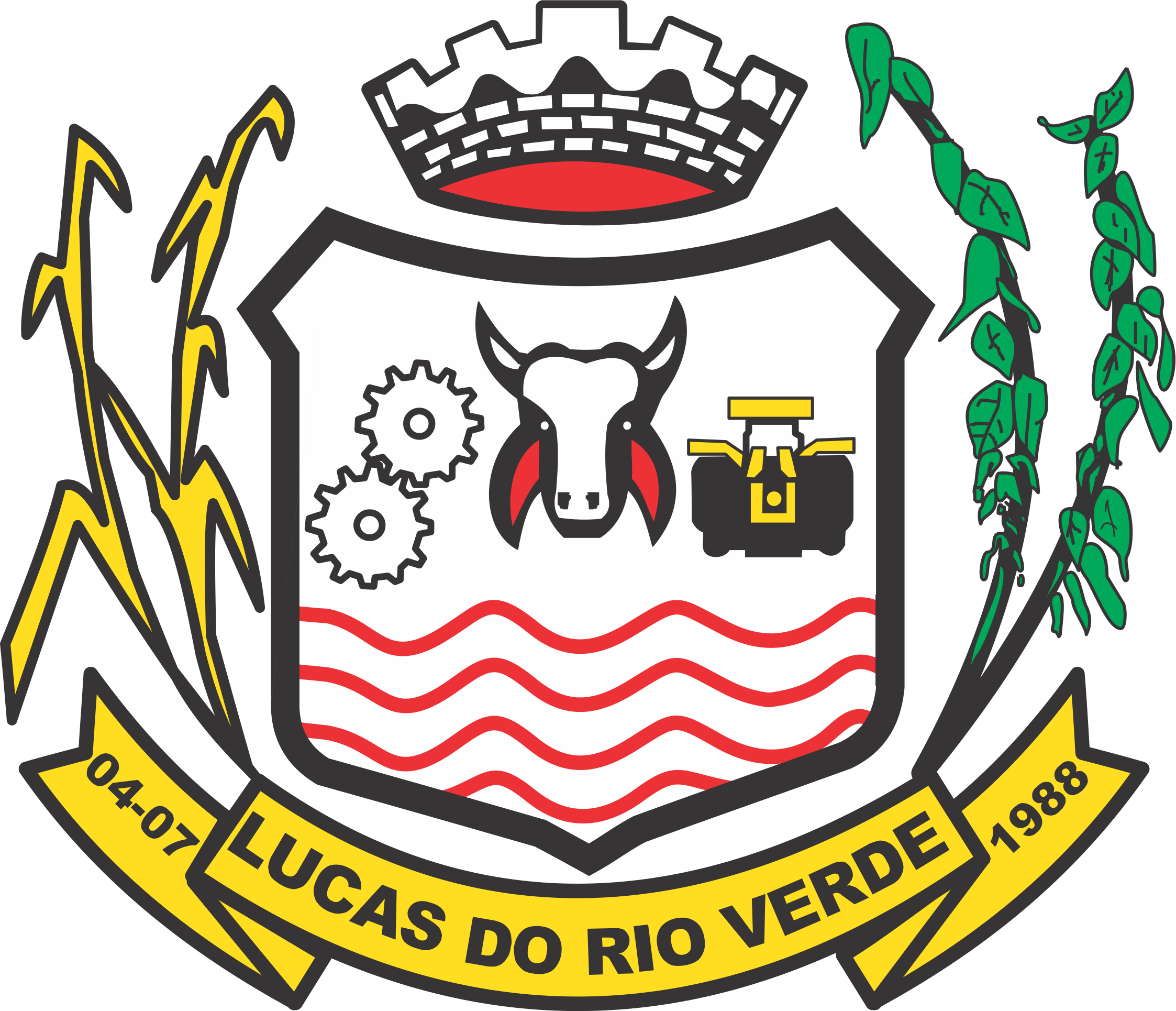
- Flag Coat of arms
- Nickname: Lucas
- Location in Mato Grosso

- Location in Brazil
- Coordinates: 13°04′19″S 55°55′09″W
- Country: Brazil
- Region: Central-West
- State: Mato Grosso
- Founded: 5 August 1988

Government
  - Type: Mayor-council
  - Mayor: Miguel Vaz (Cidadania)
  - Vice Mayor: Márcio Pandolfi (Democratic Labour Party)

Area
  - Total: 3,663.99 km^{2} (1,414.67 sq mi)
- Elevation: 398 m (1,306 ft)

Population (July 1, 2020)
  - Total: 67,620
  - Density: 18.46/km^{2} (47.80/sq mi)
- Demonym: Portuguese: luverdense
- Time zone: UTC−4 (AMT)
  - Summer (DST): UTC-3 (AMST)
- Postal Code: 78455-000
- Area code: +55 65
- HDI (2016): 0.835 very high
- Website: Lucas do Rio Verde, MT

The city of Lucas do Rio Verde (in English, "Lucas of the Green River") is located in the Brazilian state of Mato Grosso, 220 miles north of the state capital, Cuiabá. It has an area of 3,675 km^{2} and a population of 83,798. Lucas do Rio Verde is one of Brazil's major agricultural cities (soybeans, corn, cotton). The city is served by Bom Futuro Airport.
