= Legislative Assembly of Mato Grosso =

Coordinates: 7°7′15″S 35°53′2″W

Legislative Assembly of Mato Grosso Assembleia Legislativa do Mato Grosso
- 20th legislature
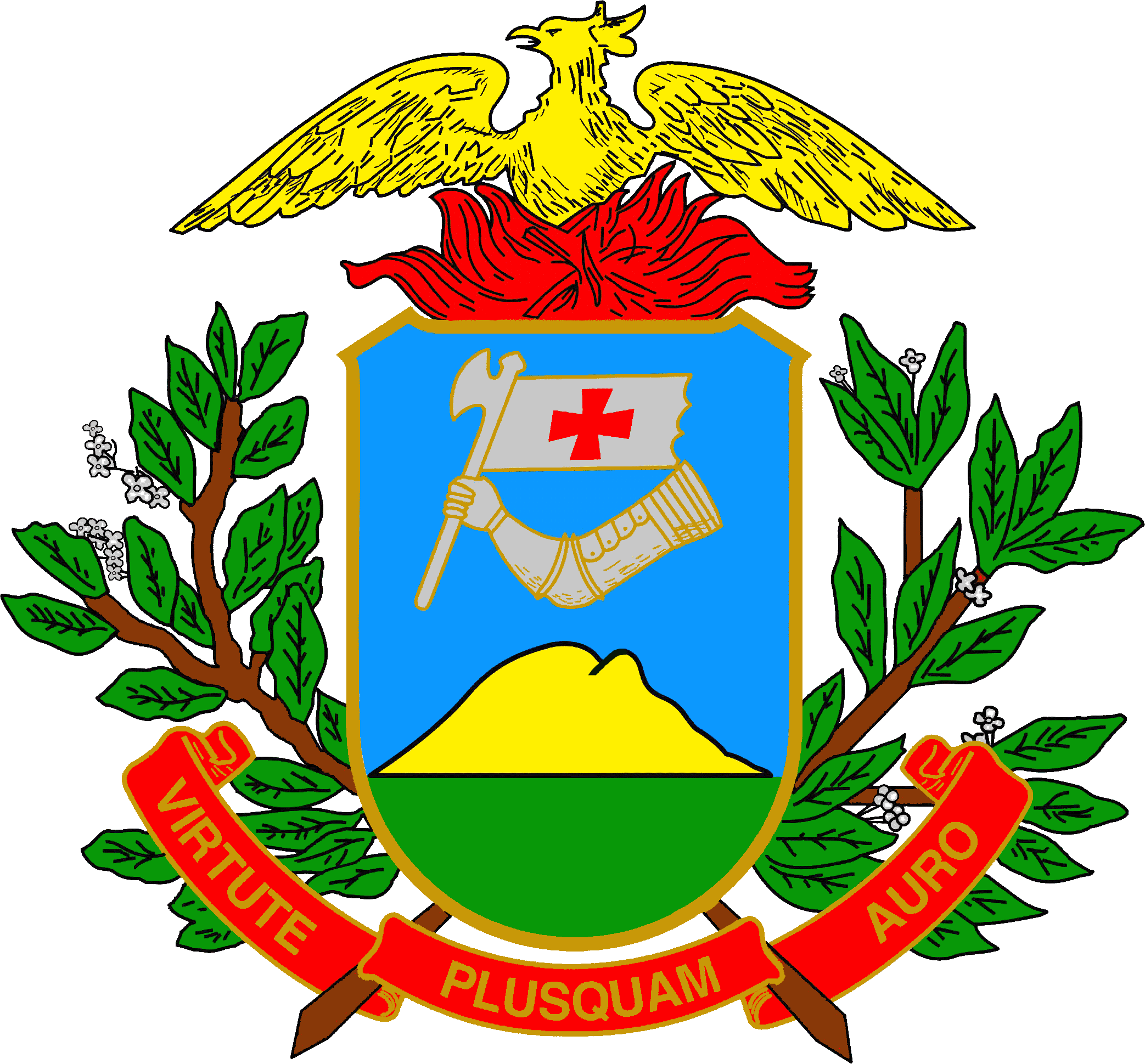

Type
- Type: Unicameral

Leadership
- President: Max Russi, PSB since 1 February 2025
- 1st VP: Júlio Campos, UNIÃO
- Government Leader: Dilmar Dal Bosco, UNIÃO

Structure
- Seats: 24 deputies
- Political groups: MDB (4) PSB (4) UNIÃO (4) Republicans (3) Always Forward (1) (Note: Cidadania (1) PSDB (1)) PL (2) PT (2) PP (1) PRD (1) PSD (1)

Elections
- Voting system: Proportional representation
- Last election: 2 October 2022
- Next election: 2026

Meeting place
- Palácio Dante de Oliveira, Cuiabá

Website
- www.al.mt.gov.br

The Legislative Assembly of Mato Grosso (Portuguese: Assembleia Legislativa do Mato Grosso) is the unicameral legislature of Mato Grosso state in Brazil. It has 24 state deputies elected by proportional representation.
