= Santo Antônio de Leverger =

- Municipality
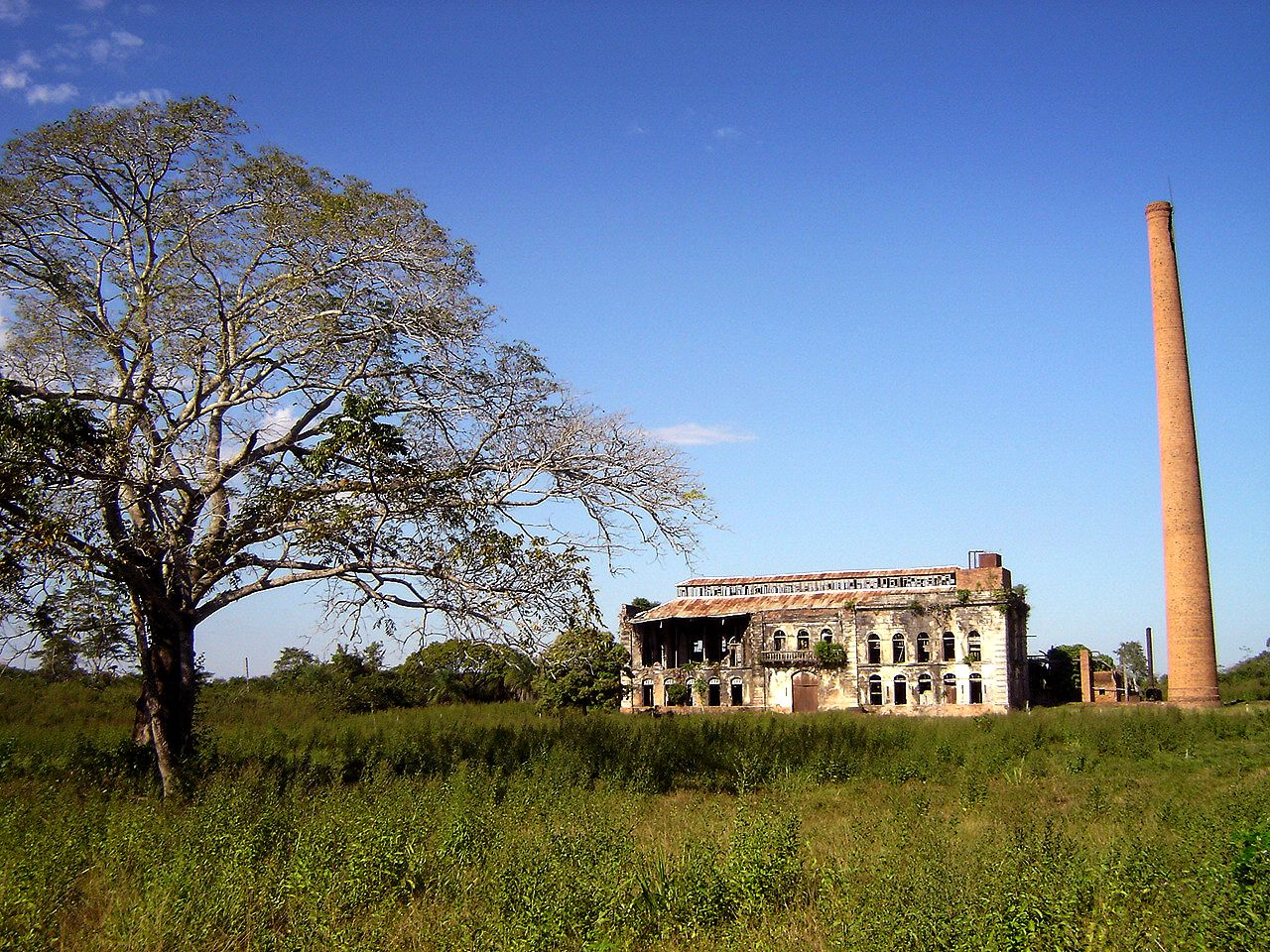
- Center of Santo Antônio de Leverger

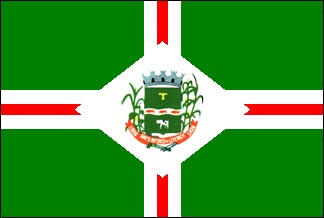
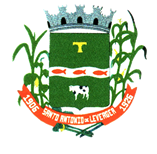
- Flag Coat of arms

- Location in Mato Grosso state

- Location in Brazil
- Coordinates: 15°51′57″S 56°4′37″W
- Country: Brazil
- State: Mato Grosso

Area
  - Total: 12,261.29 km^{2} (4,734.11 sq mi)

Population (2020)
  - Total: 16,999
  - Density: 1.3864/km^{2} (3.5907/sq mi)
- Time zone: UTC−4 (AMT)

Santo Antônio de Leverger is a municipality in the southern part of the state of Mato Grosso, Brazil. The population is 16,999 (2020 est.) in an area of 12,261.29 km^{2} (4,734.11 sq mi). Its elevation is 141 m (463 ft).

The municipality contains the 1,487-hectare (3,670-acre) Águas Quentes State Park, the first protected area in Mato Grosso, which is known for the healing powers of its thermal waters.

== Population history ==
Year	Population
2004	15,459
2006	15,469
2015	19,257
2020	16,999

== Climate ==
Climate data for Santo Antônio de Leverger (Padre Ricardo Remetter) (1991–2020)
Month	Jan	Feb	Mar	Apr	May	Jun	Jul	Aug	Sep	Oct	Nov	Dec	Year
Mean daily maximum °C (°F)	32.8 (91.0)	32.6 (90.7)	33.0 (91.4)	32.8 (91.0)	31.2 (88.2)	31.4 (88.5)	32.0 (89.6)	34.7 (94.5)	35.5 (95.9)	35.1 (95.2)	33.8 (92.8)	33.3 (91.9)	33.2 (91.8)
Daily mean °C (°F)	27.0 (80.6)	26.8 (80.2)	26.9 (80.4)	26.3 (79.3)	24.2 (75.6)	23.0 (73.4)	22.4 (72.3)	24.8 (76.6)	27.1 (80.8)	27.9 (82.2)	27.5 (81.5)	27.3 (81.1)	25.9 (78.6)
Mean daily minimum °C (°F)	23.5 (74.3)	23.4 (74.1)	23.4 (74.1)	22.4 (72.3)	19.5 (67.1)	17.4 (63.3)	15.9 (60.6)	17.6 (63.7)	20.9 (69.6)	23.0 (73.4)	23.2 (73.8)	23.5 (74.3)	21.1 (70.0)
Average precipitation mm (inches)	234.6 (9.24)	212.5 (8.37)	197.6 (7.78)	101.0 (3.98)	39.6 (1.56)	18.8 (0.74)	11.3 (0.44)	14.1 (0.56)	44.1 (1.74)	103 (4.1)	165.6 (6.52)	207.2 (8.16)	1,349.4 (53.13)
Average relative humidity (%)	82.1	83.4	83.3	82.3	81.0	77.5	71.1	61.3	61.5	69.5	75.6	79.5	75.7
Mean monthly sunshine hours	177.2	163.0	194.7	216.2	223.8	228.5	254.8	255.5	206.3	201.1	200.9	189.9	2,511.9
Source: Instituto Nacional de Meteorologia
