= Cobogó =

Hollow wall element used in Brazilian architecture

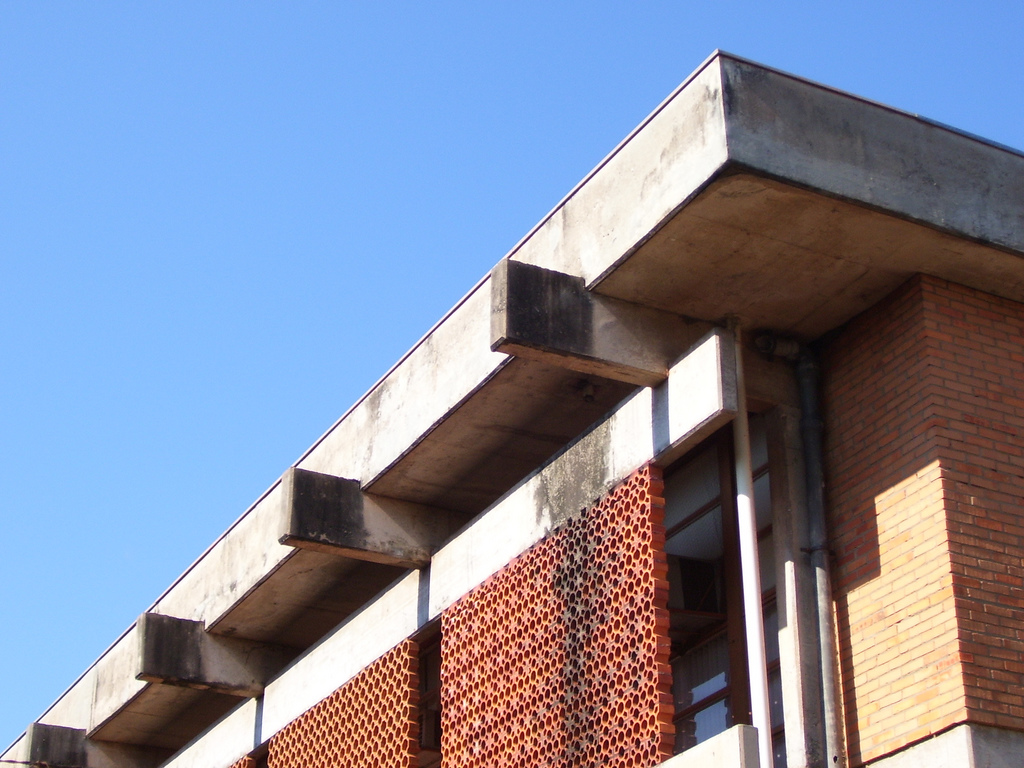
Cobogó at the Federal University of Mato Grosso, Cuiabá

Cobogó is the term generally given to the hollow wall-filling element present in some Brazilian buildings, typically made out of clay or cement. Its purpose is to enable increased airflow and light to enter the interior of a building, whether residential, commercial, or industrial.

The name derives from the initials of the surnames of three engineers from Recife who jointly conceptualized the blocks at the beginning of the 20th century (1929–1930): Amadeu Oliveira Coimbra, Ernest August Boeckmann, and Antônio de Góis.

In many parts of the Brazilian Northeast, the name has undergone variations, transforming into forms such as combobó, combogó, comogó, comongol, comogol, or even comungó.

Initially, cobogós were made exclusively of cement, but their popularization introduced a wider variety of materials, such as clay and glass, along with diverse forms and decorative hollow patterns.
