= Nobres =

- Municipality
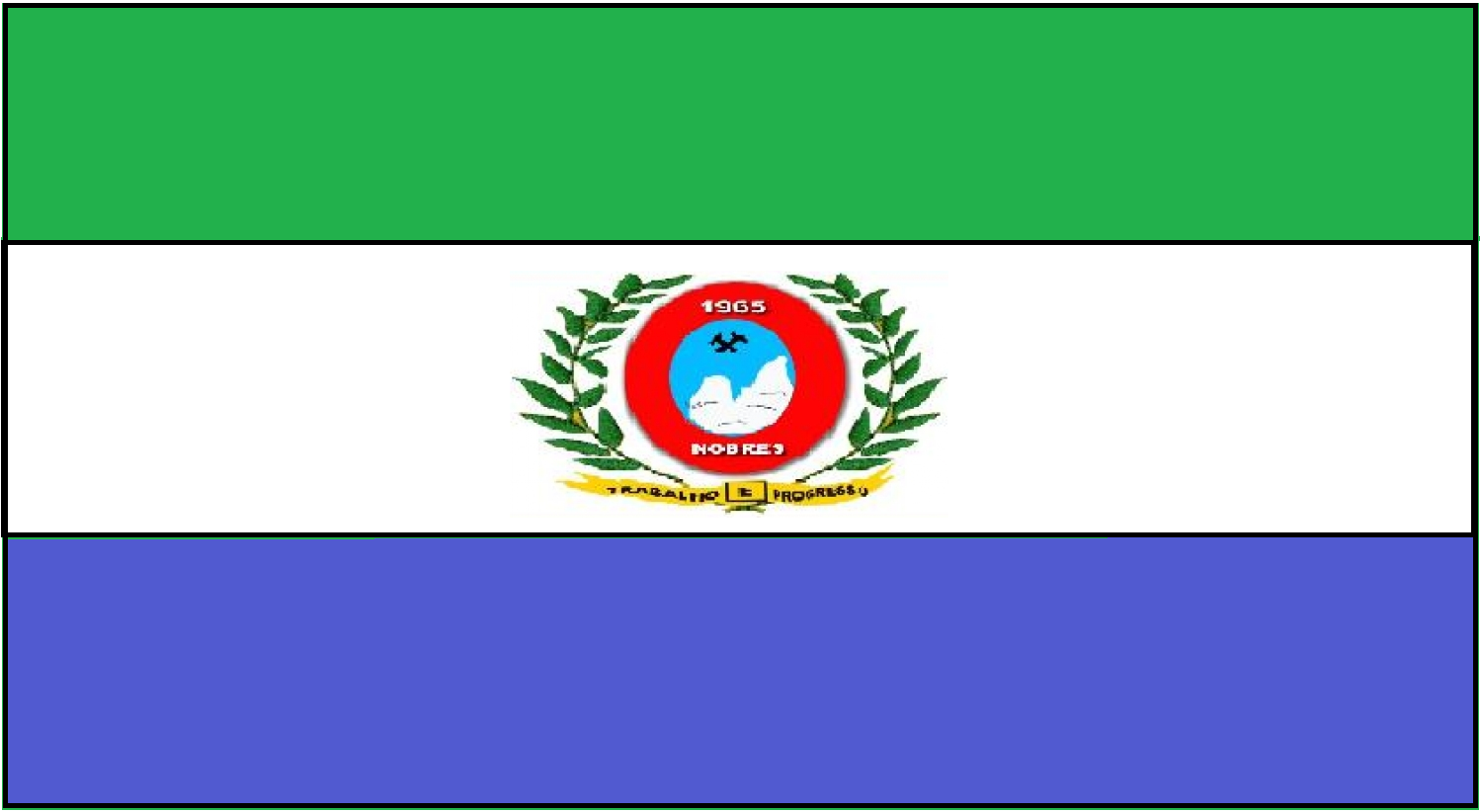
- Flag

- Location in Mato Grosso state

- Location in Brazil
- Coordinates: 14°44′S 56°20′W
- Country: Brazil
- Region: Central-West
- State: Mato Grosso

Government
  - Mayor: Leocir Hanel (PSDB)

Population (2020)
  - Total: 15,334
- Time zone: UTC−4 (AMT)
- Website: Official Website

Nobres is a city in the state of Mato Grosso, Brazil. It is located approximately 140 kilometers from Cuiabá on the south slopes of the Serra Azul.

Tourists are encouraged to visit the region for its beautiful waterways and limestone caves.

The municipality contains the 12,513 hectares (30,920 acres) Gruta da Lagoa Azul State Park (Cave of the Blue Lagoon State Park), created in 1999. The rock deposits in the area have also been used to study post-glacial carbonates. The municipality contains most of the 11,328 hectares (27,990 acres) Águas do Cuiabá Ecological Station, a fully protected conservation unit in the cerrado biome.

In 2016, its population was estimated at 14.938 people. The two major religious faiths are Roman Catholic and Protestant.
