= Central-West Region, Brazil =

Coordinates: 15°46′47″S 47°55′50″W

Central-West Region Região Centro-Oeste
- Region
- Country: Brazil
- Largest city: Brasília
- States: Distrito Federal, Goiás, Mato Grosso, Mato Grosso do Sul

Area
  - Region: 1,612,077.2 km^{2} (622,426.5 sq mi)
  - Rank: 2nd

Population
  - Region: 16,504,303
  - Rank: 5th
  - Density: 10.237911/km^{2} (26.516068/sq mi)
  - Rank: 4th
  - Urban: 86.3%

GDP
  - Total: R$ 932.166 billion (US$ 172.917 billion)

HDI
  - Year: 2007
  - Category: 0.789 – high (3rd)
  - Life expectancy: 73.2 years (3rd)
  - Infant mortality: 19.5 per 1,000 (3rd)
  - Literacy: 91.7% (3rd)
- Time zones: UTC-03 (BRT)
- UTC-04 (AMT)

The Central-West or Center-West Region of Brazil (Portuguese: Região Centro-Oeste do Brasil [ʁeʒiˈɐ̃w ˌsẽtɾoˈɛstʃi du bɾaˈziw]) is composed of the states of Goiás, Mato Grosso and Mato Grosso do Sul; along with the Distrito Federal (Federal District), where Brazil's national capital, Brasília, is situated. The region comprises 18.86% of the national territory, and is the least populated in Brazil.

With the move of the country's federal capital from Rio de Janeiro to Brasília in the 1960s, the construction of roads and railways to the interior of the country made access to the region easier, speeding up population growth and contributing significantly to the region's development.

Mato Grosso do Sul was created on 11 October 1977 by Complementary Law No. 31, materializing the decision of the government to divide the then called state of Mato Grosso in two states to facilitate to administration and the development of the region; the new state's institutions were installed on 1 January 1979.

Brasília International Airport, Marechal Rondon International Airport, Campo Grande International Airport and Santa Genoveva Airport connects the Center-West region with many Brazilian cities and also operates some international flights.

The Center-West is home to the University of Brasília, University Center of Brasília, Federal University of Goiás, Federal University of Mato Grosso do Sul, Federal University of Mato Grosso and Federal University of Rondonópolis.

== Geography ==
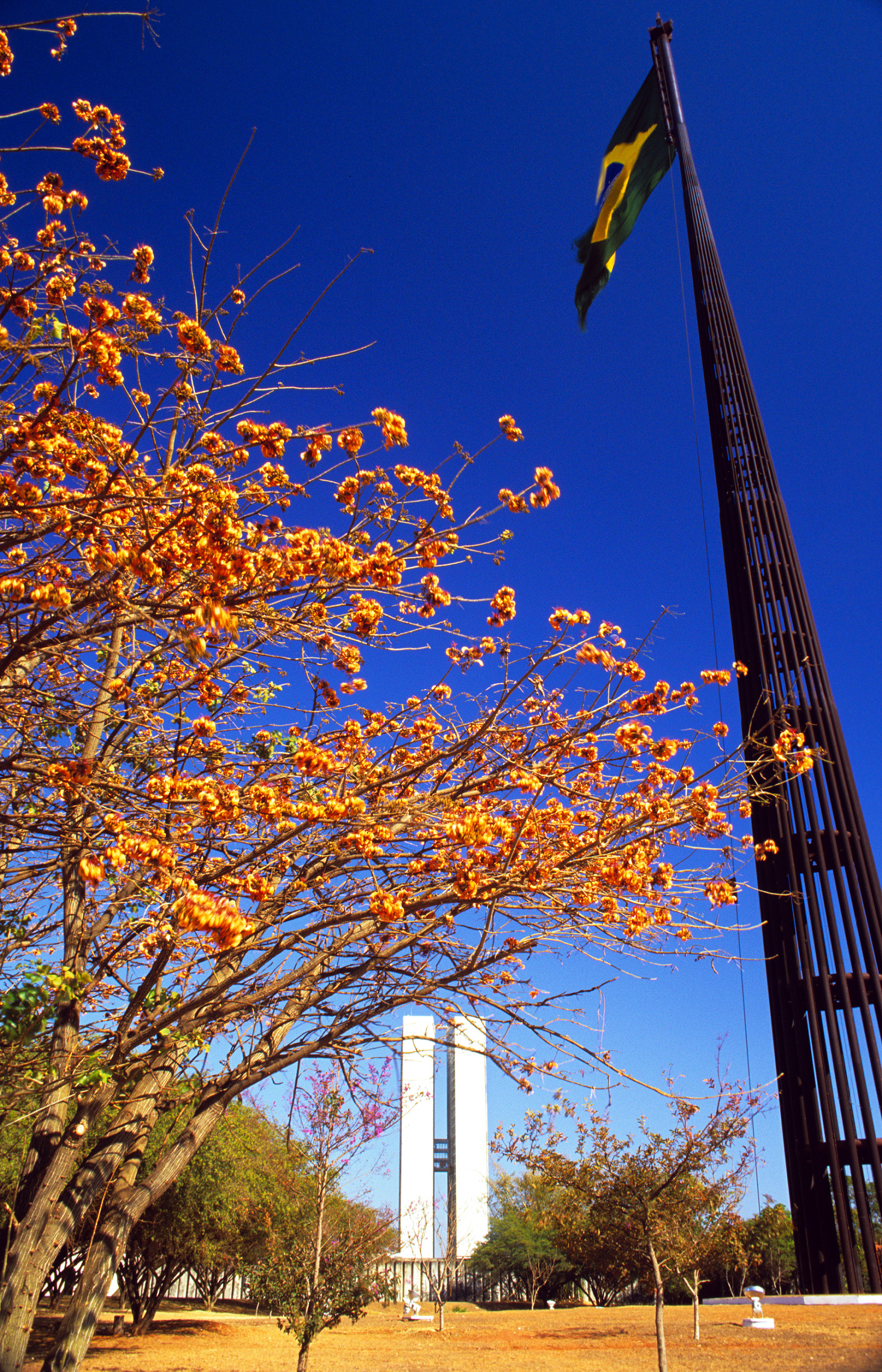
National Congress and Flag in Brasília, Federal District

Climate classification for Brazil, according to the Köppen criteria

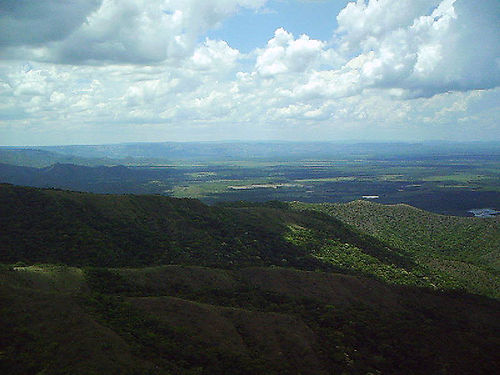
Chapada dos Guimarães National Park in Mato Grosso

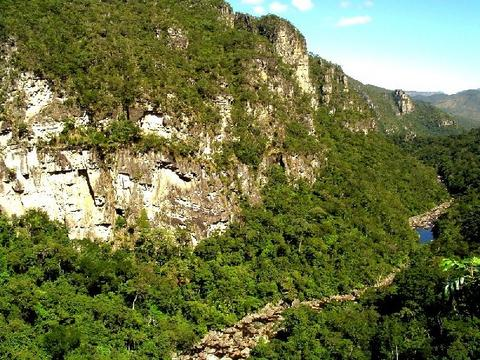
Forest in Goiás

=== Mato Grosso ===
Mato Grosso is a state with a flat landscape that alternates between vast chapadas and plain areas. Mato Grosso contains three main ecosystems: the Cerrado, the Pantanal and the Amazon rainforest. Open pasture vegetation covers 40% of the state. The Chapada dos Guimarães National Park, with caves, grottoes, tracks, and waterfalls, is one of its tourist attractions. In the north is the biodiverse Amazonian forest, which covers nearly half of the state. The Xingu Indigenous Park and the Araguaia River are in Mato Grosso. Further south, the Pantanal, the world's largest wetland, is the habitat for nearly one thousand species of animals and many aquatic birds.

=== Mato Grosso do Sul ===
The Pantanal covers 12 municipalities of Mato Grosso do Sul and presents an enormous variety of flora and fauna, with forests, natural sand banks, savannahs, open pasture, fields and bushes. The area near Bonito has prehistoric caverns, natural rivers, waterfalls, swimming pools and the Blue Lake Cave. Mato Grosso do Sul has a humid subtropical and tropical climate.

The annual rainfall is 1,500 mm. January is the warmest month, with mean maxima of 34 °C (93 °F) and minima of 24 °C (75 °F) and more rain; July experiences the coldest temperatures, with mean maxima of 25 °C (77 °F) and minima of 15 °C (59 °F) and sun. The cerrado landscape is characterized by extensive savanna formations crossed by gallery forests and stream valleys. Cerrado includes various types of vegetation.

=== Goiás ===
The most populous state of the region, Goiás presents a landscape of plateaus and chapadões. At the height of the drought, from June to September, the lack of rain makes the level of the Araguaia River go down and brings up almost 2 km of beaches.

At the Emas National Park in the municipality of Chapadão do Céu, it is possible to observe the typical fauna and the flora from the region. At the Chapada dos Veadeiros the attractions include canyons, valleys, rapids and waterfalls. Other attractions are the historical city of Goiás (or Old Goiás), at 132 km from Goiânia, established at the beginning of the 18th century, and Caldas Novas, known for its hot springs.

=== Federal District ===
Located in the state of Goiás in a region called Planalto Central, the Federal District is divided in 31 administrative regions. Brasília - where the three branches of the federal government are located - is the main attraction of this dry area with only two seasons. The rainy season is from October to March.

During the dry season, the humidity can reach critical levels, mainly in the peak hours of the hottest days. The artificial lake of Paranoá, with almost 40 km^{2} and 500 million m^{3} of water, was built to minimize the severe climatic conditions of the winter. The region also attracts mystics, and in its surroundings one can find many temples of different religions and sectarian groups.

== Demographics ==
The Central-West Region has 237 cities. The most populated are the following:

Most populated cities of Central-West Region (2009 estimation from Instituto Brasileiro de Geografia e Estatística)
Position	City	State	Pop.	Position	City	State	Pop.	Brasília Goiânia
1	Brasília	Distrito Federal	2,817,381	11	Rio Verde	Goiás	163 021	Brasília Goiânia
2	Goiânia	Goiás	1,437,366	12	Águas Lindas de Goiás	Goiás	143 179	Brasília Goiânia
3	Campo Grande	Mato Grosso do Sul	898,100	13	Valparaíso de Goiás	Goiás	123 444	Brasília Goiânia
4	Cuiabá	Mato Grosso	650,877	14	Sinop	Mato Grosso	114 051	Brasília Goiânia
5	Aparecida de Goiânia	Goiás	527,796	15	Trindade	Goiás	104 979	Brasília Goiânia
6	Anápolis	Goiás	398,869	16	Corumbá	Mato Grosso do Sul	99 467	Brasília Goiânia
7	Várzea Grande	Mato Grosso	300,078	17	Formosa	Goiás	96 284	Brasília Goiânia
8	Luziânia	Goiás	210 064	18	Itumbiara	Goiás	92 832	Brasília Goiânia
9	Dourados	Mato Grosso do Sul	189 762	19	Novo Gama	Goiás	88 835	Brasília Goiânia
10	Rondonópolis	Mato Grosso	181 902	20	Cáceres	Mato Grosso	87 261	Brasília Goiânia

== Education ==
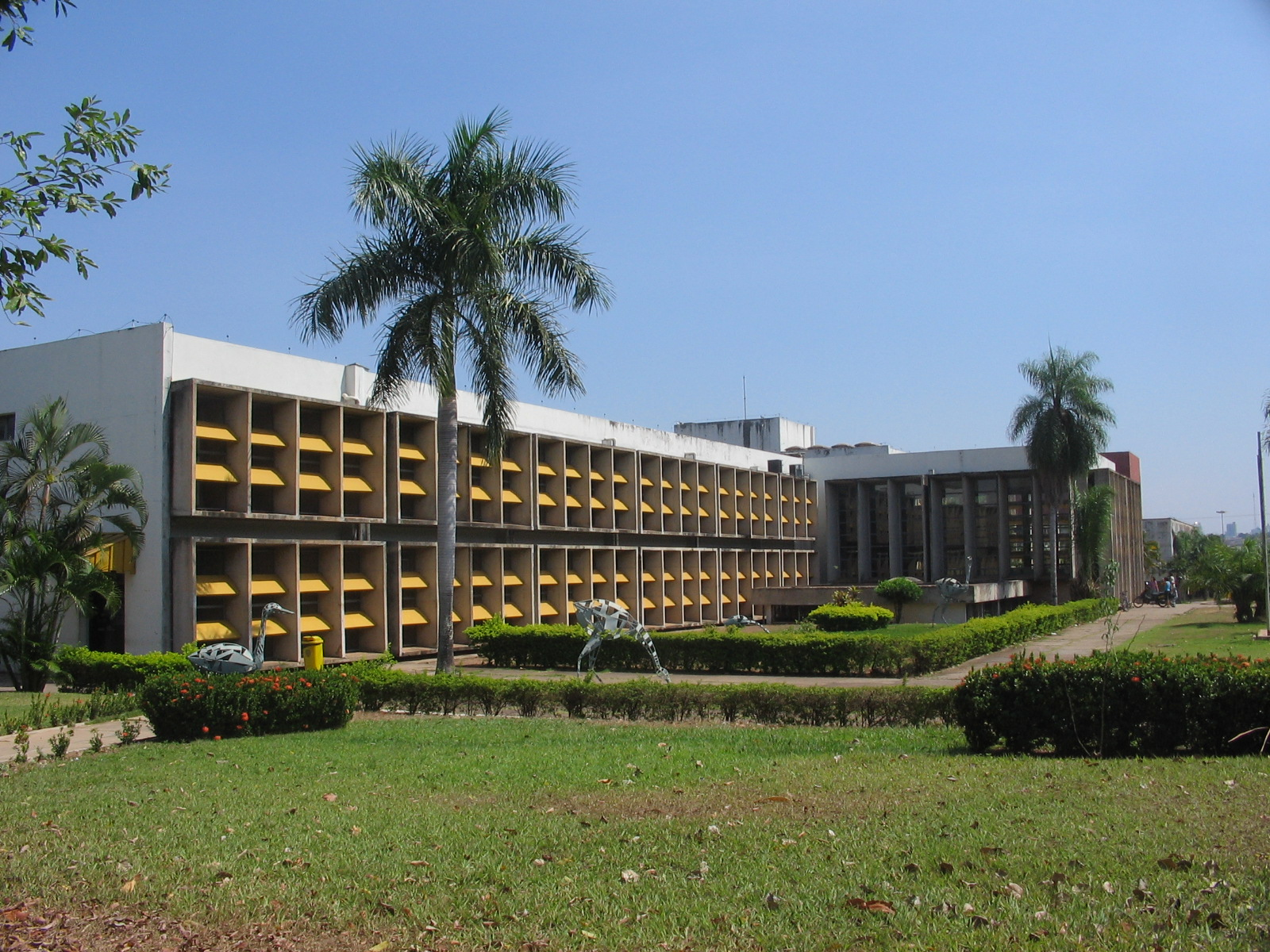
Federal University of Mato Grosso in Cuiabá

Portuguese is the official national language, and thus the primary language taught in schools. But English and Spanish are part of the official high school curriculum.

=== Educational institutions ===
- University of Brasília (UnB)
- Federal University of Mato Grosso (UFMT)
- Federal University of Goiás (UFG)
- Federal University of Mato Grosso do Sul (UFMS)

== Economy ==
=== Agriculture ===
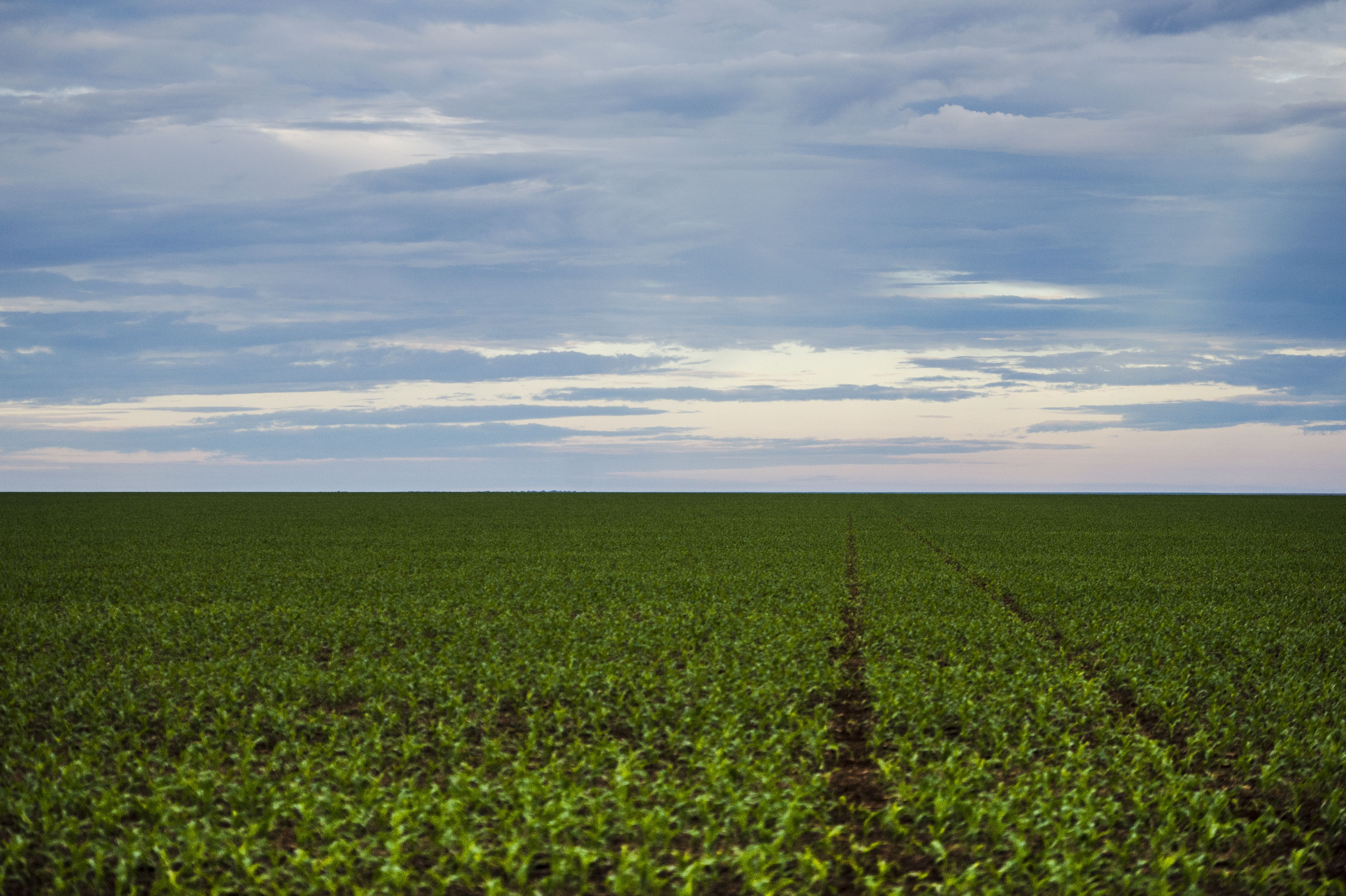
Soy in Mato Grosso

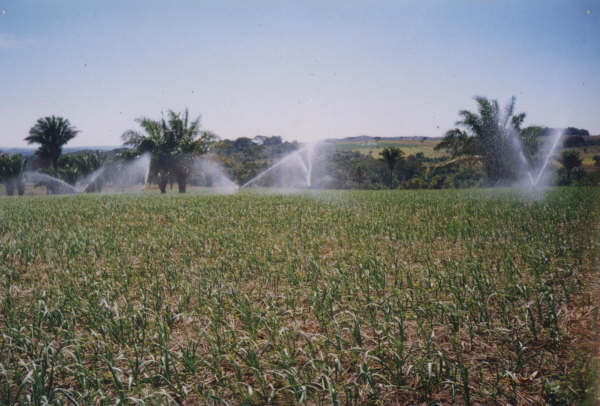
Irrigated garlic, in Goiás

The Central-West Region produces 46% of the country's cereals, legumes and oilseeds: 111.5 million tons in 2020.

Mato Grosso leads as the largest national producer of grains in the country, with a 28.0% share, with Goiás (10.0%) in 4th place and Mato Grosso do Sul (7.9%) in 5th place.

Mato Grosso is the largest soy producer in Brazil, with 26.9% of the total produced in 2020 (33.0 million tons). In the 2019/20 harvest, Goiás was the fourth largest soybean producer, with 12.46 million tons. Mato Grosso do Sul produced 10.5 million tons in 2020, one of the largest producing states in Brazil, around fifth place. Brazil is the world's largest soybean producer, with 120 million tons harvested in 2019.

In 2017, Mato Grosso was the largest producer of maize in the country; fourth, Goiás. In 2019, Mato Grosso do Sul was also one of the largest maize producers in the country with 10.1 million tons. Brazil is the second largest corn producer in the world, with 107 million tons harvested in 2019.

Goiás is the second largest producer of sugarcane in the country, 11.3% of national production, with 75.7 million tons harvested in the 2019/20 harvest. Mato Grosso do Sul ranks fourth, with about 49 million tons harvested. Mato Grosso harvested 16 million tons, remaining in sixth place.

Mato Grosso is also the largest producer of cotton in Brazil, with around 65% of the national production (1.8 of the 2.8 million tons harvested in the country). Goiás is in fourth place.

Mato Grosso is the third largest producer of bean in the country, with 10.5% of the Brazilian production. Goiás was the fourth largest producer of beans in Brazil in the 2017/18 harvest, with 374 thousand tons, and has about 10% of the country's production. Brazil is the third largest producer of beans in the world.

Goiás and Minas Gerais represent 74.8% of the Brazilian production of sorghum. Goiás has the national leadership: it produced 44% of the Brazilian agricultural production in the 2019/2020 cycle, with a harvest of 1.09 million tons.

Goiás is also the leader in Brazilian tomato production: in 2019 it produced more than 1.2 million tons, a third of the country's total production.

The Central-West Region also has relevant productions of garlic, sunflower and manioc.

=== Livestock ===
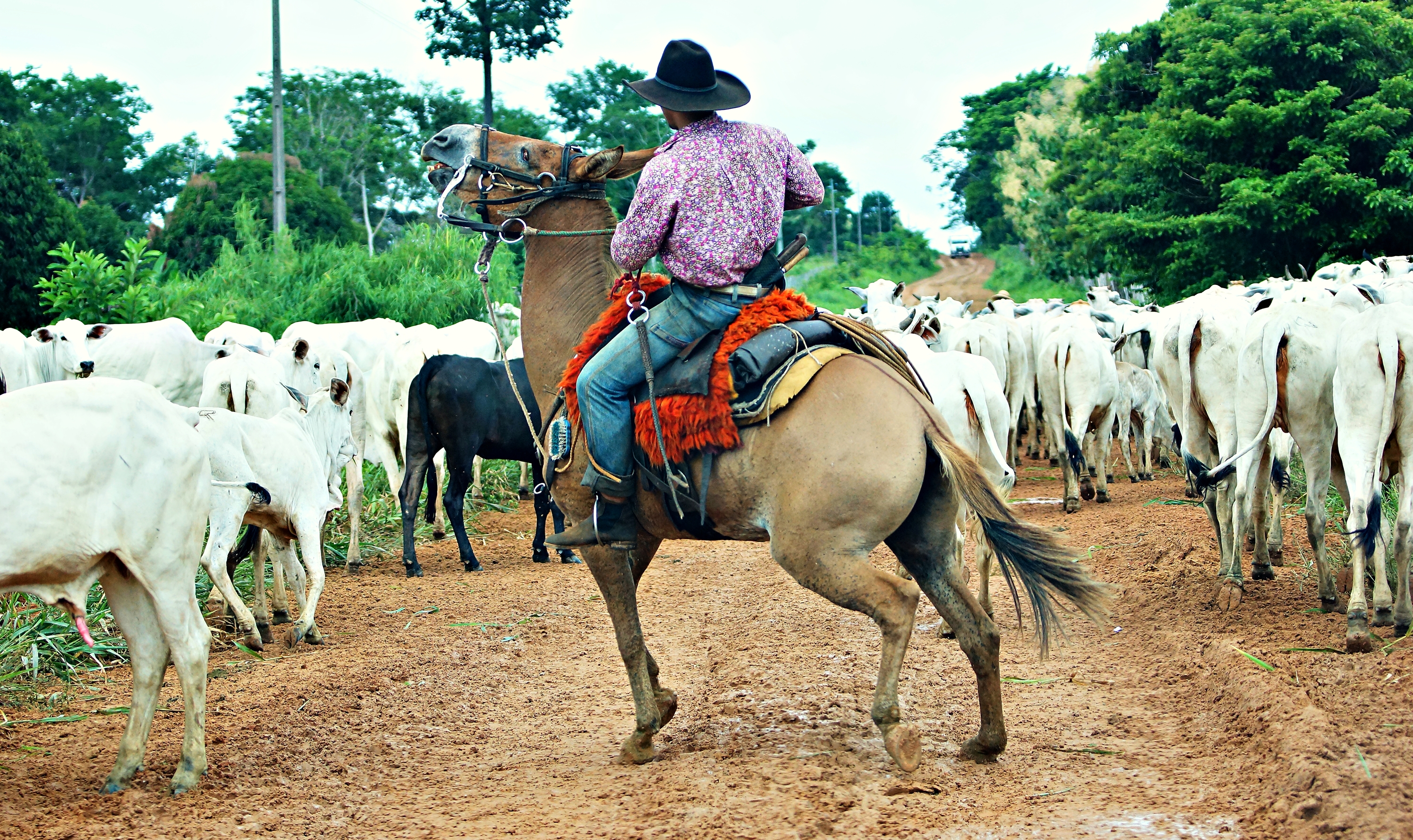
Cattle in Mato Grosso

In cattle, Brazil had almost 215 million head of cattle in 2017. The Center-West had 74 million head, 34.5% of the Brazilian total, being the leading region of the country. Regarding pork, Brazil had almost 42 million pigs in 2017. The Central-West had almost 15% of the total (6.2 million). In poultry, Brazil had a total of 1,400 million chickens in 2017. The Central-West had 12.2% of the total (172 million). In milk production, Brazil produced 33.5 billion liters in 2017. The Center-West produced 12% of the total (almost 4 billion liters). In egg production, Brazil produced 4.2 billion dozen in 2017. The Center-West produced 11.6% (489 million dozen).

=== Mining ===
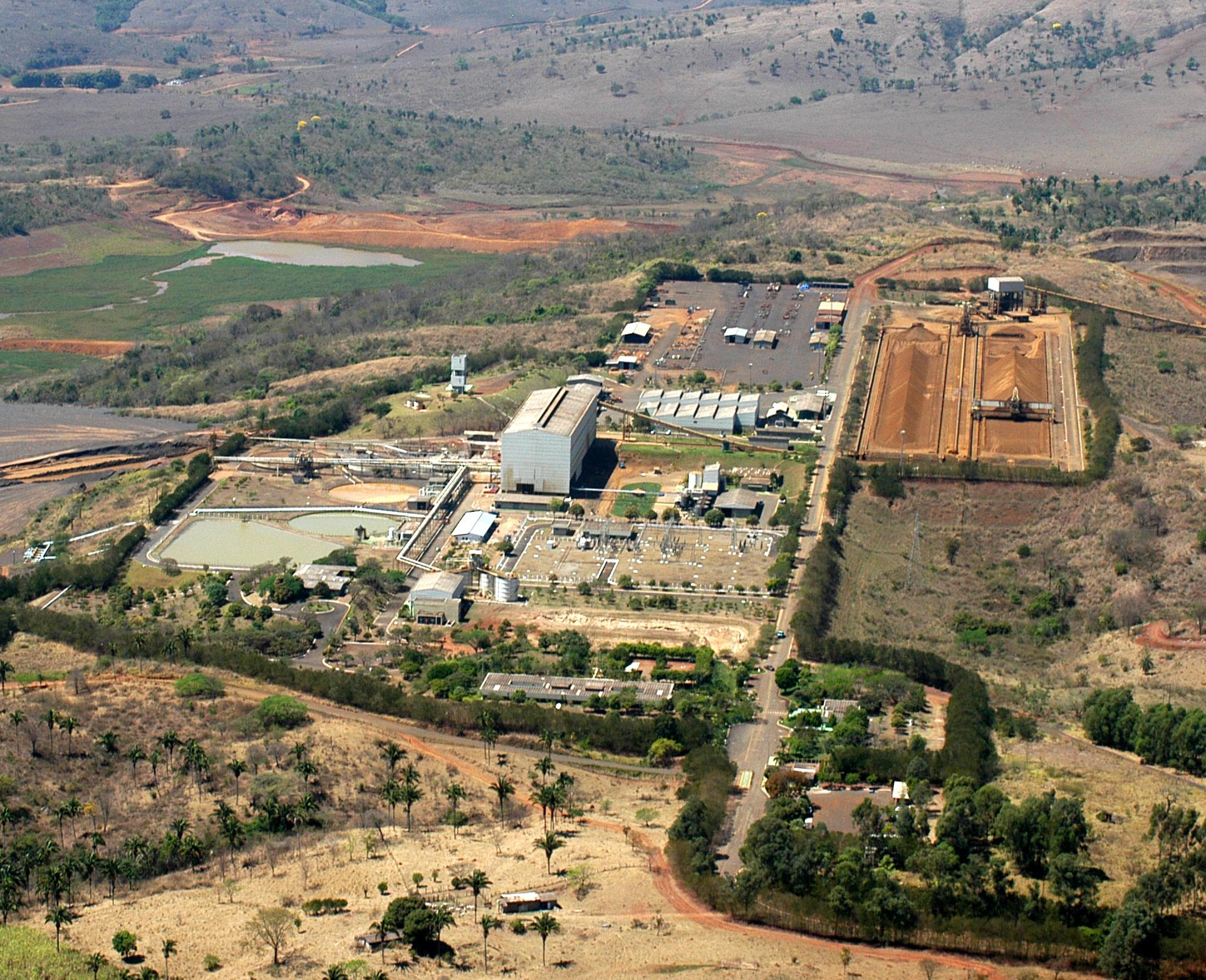
Chemical-mineral complex of the Fosfértil company in Catalão.

Goiás has 4.58% of the national mining participation (3rd place in the country). In 2017, in nickel, Goiás and Pará are the only two producers in the country, with Goiás being the first in production, having obtained 154 thousand tons for a value of R $ 1.4 billion. In copper, it was the second largest producer in the country, with 242 thousand tons, at a value of R $ 1.4 billion. In gold, it was the fourth largest producer in the country, with 10.2 tons, with a value of R $ 823 million. In niobium (in the form of pyrochlor), it was the second largest producer in the country, with 27 thousand tons, with a value of R $ 312 million. In aluminum (bauxite), it was the 3rd largest producer in the country, with 766 thousand tons, for a value of R $ 51 million. Still in 2017, in the Center-West, Mato Grosso had 1.15% of the national mining participation (fifth place in the country) and Mato Grosso do Sul had 0.71% of the national mineral participation (sixth place in the country). Mato Grosso had production of gold (8.3 tons worth R $ 1 billion) and tin (536 tons worth R $ 16 million). Mato Grosso do Sul had production of iron (3.1 million tons with a value of R $ 324 million) and manganese (648 thousand tons with a value of R $ 299 million).

=== Industry ===
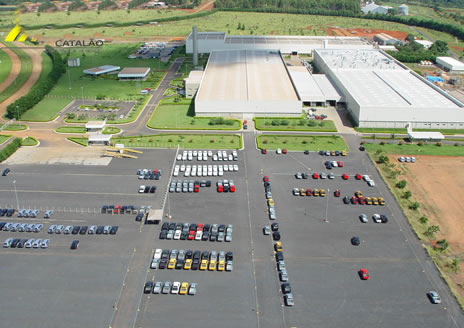
Mitsubishi factory in Goiás

The Central-West has 6% of the country's industrial GDP.

In Brazil, the automotive sector represents about 22% of industrial GDP. Goiás has Mitsubishi, Suzuki and Hyundai factories.

In Três Lagoas, the production of paper and cellulose is considerable. Mato Grosso do Sul recorded growth above the national average in the production of pulp, reached the mark of 1 million hectares of planted eucalyptus trees, expanded its industrial park in the sector and consolidated itself as the largest exporter of the product in the country in the first quarter of 2020. Between the years 2010 to 2018, the production of Mato Grosso do Sul soared by 308%, reaching 17 million cubic meters of roundwood for paper and pulp in 2018. In 2019, Mato Grosso do Sul reached the leadership of exports in the product in the country, with 9.7 million tons sold: 22.20% of total Brazilian pulp exports that year.

== Tourism and recreation ==
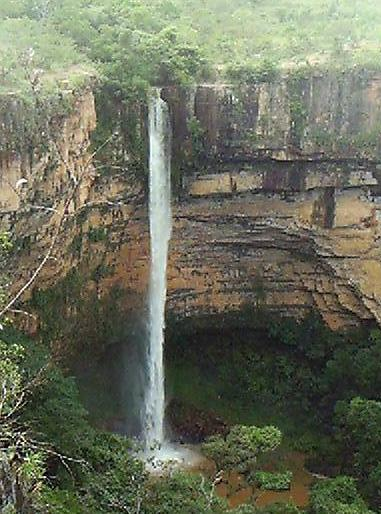
Waterfall in Chapada do Guimarães, Mato Grosso

Tourism to the region has grown in recent decades, attracting visitors from Brazil and abroad to enjoy the region's natural history and scenery.

Located in the middle of the Central Upland, the Central-West Region has tours in the interior of the country. Starting in the west part of Mato Grosso do Sul State and the southeast part of Mato Grosso State, is the Pantanal Mato-grossense; the largest swampy plain area in the world, cut by the Paraguai River. Its fauna and flora have drawn attention. In the same state, it is possible to take tours through places such as Alta Floresta, where ecotourism is an attraction; Bonito, a place with crystalline waters; and Chapada dos Guimarães National Park, which has mountains and landscapes with meadow vegetation.

Dividing the States of Mato Grosso, Mato Grosso do Sul and Goiás, the Araguaia River attracts numerous fishermen from all parts of Brazil and the world. And in the state of Goiás, historical attractions, such as Pirenópolis draw many visitors all year long, with its steep stone-paved streets and its colonial houses. Other attractions in the same state include Chapada dos Veadeiros and the National Park of Emas, where the contact with nature is the essence of the tours. In the Federal District, the National Park of Brasília is one of the greatest local attractions.

== Infrastructure ==
=== International airports ===
- Brasília

Brasília International Airport - President Juscelino Kubitschek (BSB/SBBR) serves the metropolitan area with major domestic and international flights. Brasília International Airport is the third largest in Brazil in terms of passenger movement. Because of its strategic location it is considered a civil aviation hub for the rest of the country. This makes for a large number of takeoffs and landings and it is not unusual flights to have to wait in the holding pattern to land. Following the airport's master plan, Infraero built a second runway, which was finished in 2006.

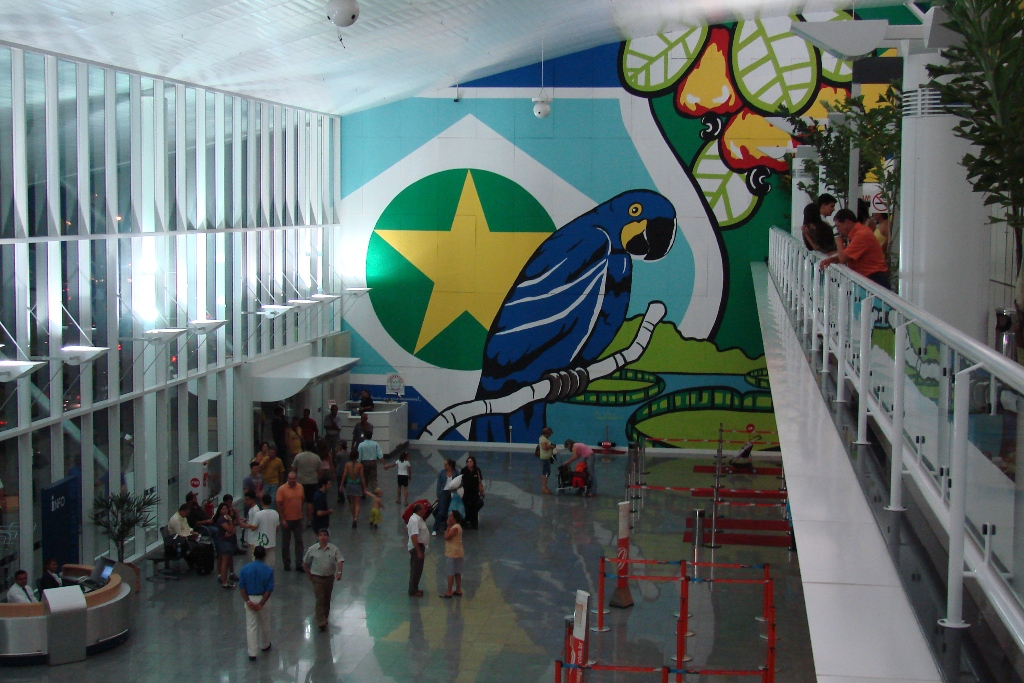
Marechal Rondon International Airport

- Cuiabá

The runway at Marechal Rondon International Airport was opened to traffic in 1956. In February 1975, Infraero took over the airport's administration and began various upgrades to meet the needs of the airport complex. As of 1996, Marechal Rondon Airport, located 10 km (6.2 mi) from the city center, started receiving international flights. Currently it serves more than 900 thousand passengers a year.

- Campo Grande

The operation of Campo Grande International Airport is shared with the Campo Grande Air Base. The airport has two runways. Construction of the main runway, made of concrete, began in 1950 and was finished in 1953. The passenger terminal was concluded in 1964, and in 1967 concrete aprons were built for both military and civilian aircraft. As commercial aviation demand grew, it became necessary to widen the civil aircraft apron, which was completed 12 years after its construction. The airport has been administered by Inferaero since 1975.

=== National Airport ===
- Goiânia

Santa Genoveva Airport is the main airport of Goiânia, providing flights to major cities in Brazil. Modernization work is underway to construct a new runway and terminal to handle the growing number of air passenger in and out of Goiânia.

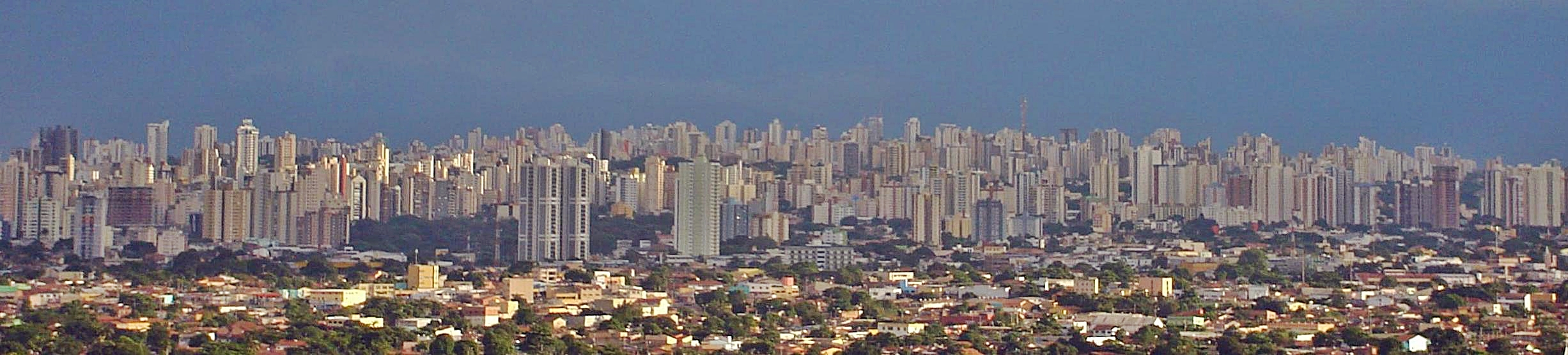
A panorama of Goiânia City
