= Flag of Mato Grosso =

Flag of the Brazilian state of Mato Grosso

- Use: Civil and state flag
- Proportion: 7:10
- Adopted: 31 January 1890; 136 years ago
- Design: A blue banner with a white rhombus in its center which contains a green sphere and yellow star.
- Designed by: Antônio Maria Coelho

The flag of Mato Grosso is the official flag of the Brazilian state of Mato Grosso. The current flag was introduced on 31 January 1890 by the 2nd Decree of the state of Mato Grosso. It was introduced only 2 months after the Empire of Brazil was overthrown and the First Brazilian Republic was created, making this one of the first Brazilian state flags. As such, it uses the same colors and symbolism used in the Brazilian flag to signify the republican ideals of the founders of the newly formed nation.

== History ==
At the end of the 19th century, the cities of Rio de Janeiro and Cuiabá were not connected by telegraph so communication between Mato Grosso and the capital was limited to rivers and horseback. As such, news of the proclamation of the republic, which occurred on 15 November 1889, only arrived in Cuiabá on 9 December 1889. It was brought by Antônio Maria Coelho, a veteran of the Paraguayan war known for his role in the Recapture of Corumbá. He was shortly thereafter nominated as the first governor of the state of Mato Grosso by Deodoro da Fonseca, the first president of Brazil.

One of his first decrees as governor was the creation of the flag of the state of Mato Grosso, which briefly stated that "the private flag of the federal state of Mato Grosso shall be blue, with a white rhombus, in the center of it a green sphere or globe and a yellow star with its rays touching the circumference of the sphere" and that the flag should be "raised on gala days, below the national flag".

== Symbolism ==
The colors of the flag are the same as the Brazilian Flag and are a representation of the integration of the state with Brazil, separately each color and element of the flag has a specific meaning:

- The blue banner represents the sky seen in Rio de Janeiro on the night of the proclamation of the republic.
- The white rhombus symbolizes the positivist movement, a fundamental philosophy in the Brazilian republic, as well as purity, peace, and optimism.
- The green sphere represents hope, youth, and coexistence between humankind and nature. Its prominence in the center of the flag is a representation of the states territorial grandeur.
- The central yellow star represents Sirius, the star on the Brazilian Flag that represents Mato Grosso. Its color symbolizes wealth, culture, and glory, as well as the bandeirantes who explored the interior of Brazil.

== See also ==
- List of Mato Grosso state symbols
