= Águas Quentes State Park =

State park in Mato Grosso, Brazil

- Parque Estadual das Águas Quentes
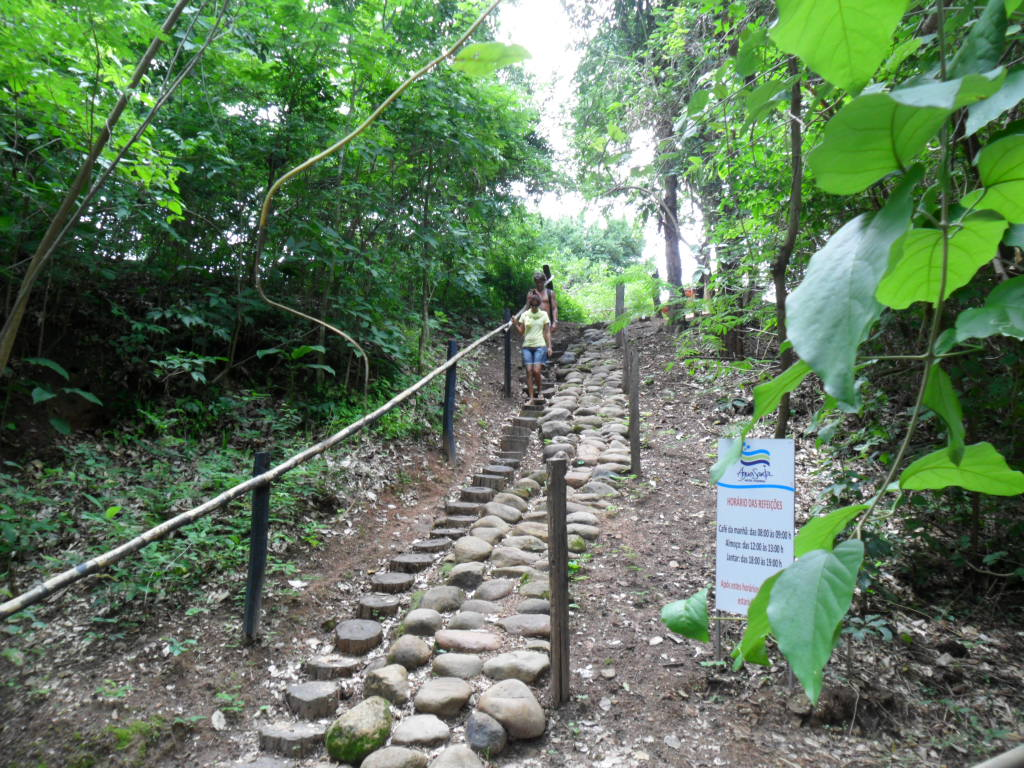
- Path through the park

- Location within Brazil
- Nearest city: Santo Antônio do Leverger, Mato Grosso
- Coordinates: 15.887°S 55.515°W
- Area: 1,487 hectares (3,670 acres)
- Designation: State park
- Administrator: Coordenadoria de Unidades de Conservação, Mato Grosso

The Águas Quentes State Park (Portuguese: Parque Estadual das Águas Quentes) is a state park in the state of Mato Grosso, Brazil

== Location ==
The Águas Quentes State Park is in the municipality of Santo Antônio do Leverger, Mato Grosso. It has an area of 1,487 hectares (3,670 acres). The MT-455 highway runs through the park from north to south. The park is just 80 kilometres (50 mi) from the capital, Cuiabá. It is named for its thermal waters, which have temperatures from 31 to 43 °C (88 to 109 °F), used for physiotherapy and treating rheumatism. There is a concession for a hotel operating company until 2041. The hotel has 75 apartments, leisure facilities such as a pool, waterslide, zip lines and restaurant. There are waterfalls, thermal water pools and hiking trails.

== Environment ==
The Águas Quentes State Park is in the Guimarães plateau in the Paraguay River depression. The park's vegetation is mainly cerrado, including savanna/seasonal forest, savanna with open trees, riverine forest and seasonal submontane forest. As of 2005 the park was 34% deforested, up from 30% deforested in 2002. Tree species include the Jacarezinho, Curatella americana, Ceiba speciosa and Genipa americana. Fauna includes tapir, peccary, ocelot, paca, armadillo, howler monkey and toucan.

== History ==
The Águas Quentes State Park is the first protected area of Mato Grosso. The Águas Quentes State Park was created by decree 1.240 of 13 January 1978 in an area owned by the Empresa Matogrossense de Turismo with an area of 1,487 hectares (3,670 acres). On 13 August 2010 SEDTUR agreed that SEMA should prepare a management plan for the park. On 17 October 2014 SEMA called on owners or leaseholders of land in the park to provide documentation of their claim. Ownership of the land has been regularised, with all former landowners indemnified. The consultative council was created on 15 December 2014. The management plan was approved on 15 March 2015.

== Sources ==
- "Hotel MT Águas Quentes", Hotel Mato Grosso (in Portuguese)
- Parque Estadual das Águas Quentes (in Portuguese), Via Rural, archived from the original on August 6, 2016
- PES Águas Quentes (in Portuguese), ISA: Instituto Socioambiental
- Roberta dos Santos; Laurent Micol; Gustavo Irgang; Jane Vasconcellos (September 2006), O desmatamento nas Unidades de Conservação em Mato Grosso (PDF), Alta Floresta e Cuiabá: Instituto Centro de Vida
