= Gruta da Lagoa Azul State Park =

State park in Mato Grosso, Brazil

- Parque Estadual Gruta da Lagoa Azul
- IUCN category II (national park)
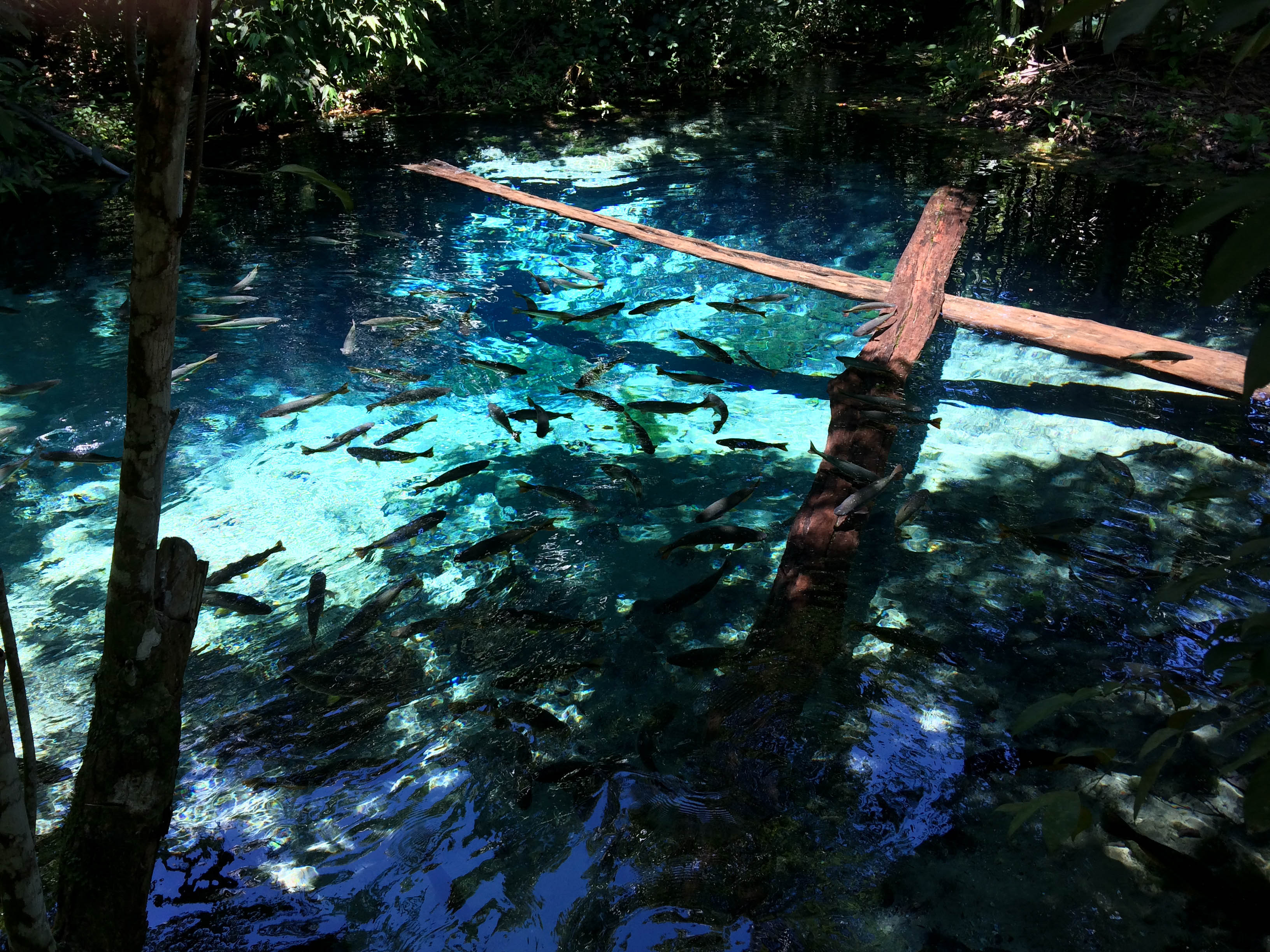
- Aquário Encantado

- Location within Brazil
- Coordinates: 14°34′28″S 55°57′53″W
- Area: 12,513 hectares (30,920 acres)
- Designation: State park
- Created: 13 December 1999
- Administrator: Fundação Estadual do Meio Ambiente de Mato Grosso

The Gruta da Lagoa Azul State Park (Portuguese: Parque Estadual Gruta da Lagoa Azul (Note: Gruta da Lagoa Azul may be translated as "Blue Lagoon Cave".)) is a state park in the state of Mato Grosso, Brazil. Its primary attraction is a limestone cave with a pool of blue water and unusual cave formations. These have suffered from vandalism, causing the cave to be closed until measures to protect it could be implemented.

== Location ==
The Gruta da Lagoa Azul State Park is in the municipality of Nobres, Mato Grosso. It has an area of 12,513 hectares (30,920 acres). The blue lagoon cave holds a pool of blue water formed from underground water of the Saloba River. The main entrance is filled in part by the water. The hall contains columns over 5 metres (16 ft) in size and 1 metre (3 ft 3 in) in diameter. There may be archaeological remains in the cave. The park has several other limestone caves. It is covered with deciduous forests, and is home to howler monkeys, tapirs, jaguars and macaws.

== History ==
The Gruta da Lagoa Azul State Park was created by decree 1.472 of 13 December 1999 with an area of about 12,512.55 hectares (30,919.2 acres), including the former 512.55 hectares (1,266.5 acres) Gruta Lagoa Azul Reserve. On 30 May 1999 an ordinance prohibited public visits until a management plan had been prepared for the purpose of preserving the cave while allowing tourism. Law 7.369 of 20 December 2000 confirmed the decree creating the park. The Speleological Management Plan for the cave was approved on 10 February 2014. The consultative council was created on 15 December 2014.

== Threats ==
The main threat comes from damage by tourists and local agriculture. The cave has a very fragile ecosystem, dependent on constant temperature and humidity. Increased CO_{2} from the visitors' breath and heat from their lights can encourage fungus and lichens to attack the speleothems. Damage includes broken speleothems, carvings and writing on the walls. Local residents are aware that the cave has been quite badly vandalised, and that it is a valuable tourist attraction. They were in favour of closing the cave until a plan could be prepared to prevent further management.

== Sources ==
- Herminia E Luciana Martins, Diagnóstico dos Impactos Ambientais da Gruta da Lagoa Azul, Município de Nobres - MT (in Portuguese), archived from the original on 2016-08-21
- Parque Estadual Gruta da Lagoa Azul (in Portuguese), Via Rural, archived from the original on 2016-08-06
- PES Gruta da Lagoa Azul (in Portuguese), ISA: Instituto Socioambiental
