= List of Mato Grosso state symbols =

Location of the state of Mato Grosso in Brazil

The following is a list of symbols of the Brazilian state of Mato Grosso.

== State symbols ==
Type	Symbol	Date	Image
Flag	Flag of Mato Grosso	31 January 1890	
Coat of arms	Coat of arms of Mato Grosso	14 August 1918	
Song	Anthem of Mato Grosso	1983	

== Flora ==
Type	Symbol	Date	Image
Tree	Tarumeiro Vitex Polygama	20 May 2013	
Medicinal plant	Sucupira Pterodon pubescens	30 July 2012	

== Fauna ==
Type	Symbol	Date	Image
Bird	Tuiuiú Jabiru mycteria	22 May 2006	
Animal	Cavalo Pantaneiro	14 November 2007	

== Other ==
Type	Symbol	Date	Image
Drink	Powdered guaraná	16 February 2000	
Musical rhythm	Rasqueado	11 November 2004	
