= Federal University of Rondonópolis =

Brazilian federal university

Coordinates: 16.465°S 54.579°W

- Universidade Federal de Rondonópolis
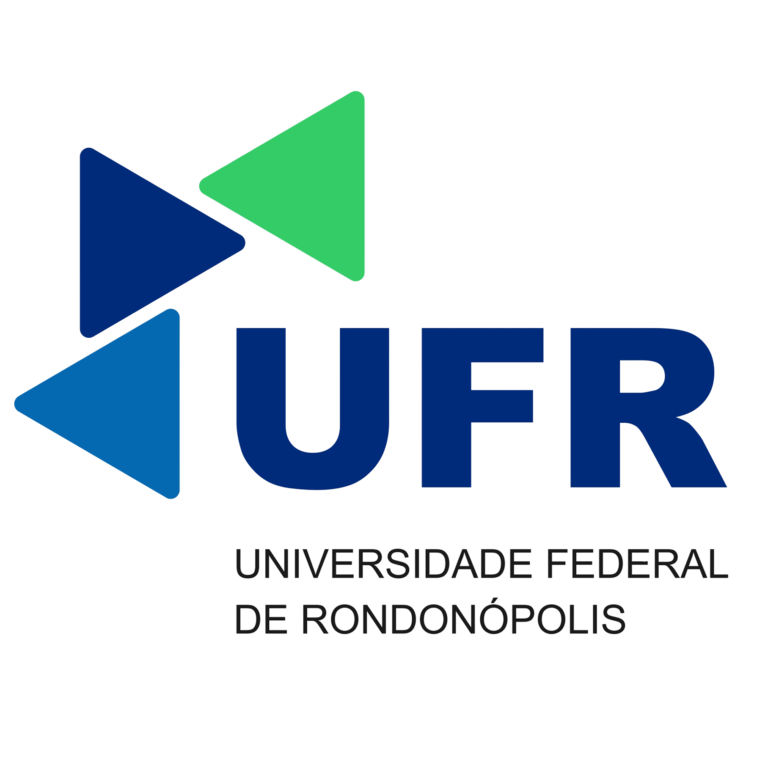
- Other name: UFR
- Type: Public university
- Established: 20 March 2018; 8 years ago
- Rector: Analy Castilho Polizel de Souza
- Undergraduates: 4,300
- Location: Rondonópolis, Mato Grosso, Brazil
- Website: ufr.edu.br/

The Federal University of Rondonópolis (Universidade Federal de Rondonópolis, UFR) is a federal public higher education institution linked to the Ministry of Education, headquartered in the city of Rondonópolis, Mato Grosso, in the Central-West region of Brazil.

The history of the UFR is marked by struggles that date back to 1974, when the city's inhabitants demanded the creation of higher education courses with the Corumbá Pedagogical Center of the State University of Mato Grosso (UEMT). Thus, on March 31, 1976, the Rondonópolis Pedagogical Center was created, with two short-term undergraduate courses: Social studies and exact sciences. With the division of the State of Mato Grosso in 1979, the Rondonópolis Pedagogical Center was incorporated into the Federal University of Mato Grosso (UFMT), which had been created in 1970.

On March 20, 2018, the Federal University of Rondonópolis was created from the separation of the Rondonópolis University Campus from the Federal University of Mato Grosso, through Federal Law No. 13,637, sanctioned by then President Michel Temer. It was one of five federal universities to have all of its positions and paid functions eliminated in 2019 by President Jair Bolsonaro. However, in December 2019, Professor Analy Castilho Polizel took office as pro tempore rector; with this act, the UFR became de iure an autonomous federal university with its own budget.

Currently, the UFR has more than 4,300 enrolled students, around 300 tenured professors, approximately 60 substitutes, and 90 administrative technicians. The university has 4 institutes, 19 undergraduate courses and 6 postgraduate programs at stricto sensu master's level, in addition to developing teaching, research, extension and innovation projects.

== See also ==
- List of federal universities of Brazil
