= Mato Grosso =

State of Brazil

- State
- Flag Coat of arms
- Motto(s): Virtute Plusquam Auro (Latin) "By virtue more than by gold"
- Anthem: "Hino de Mato Grosso"
- Location in Brazil
- Coordinates: 15°34′00″S 56°04′30″W
- Country: Brazil
- Region: Central-West
- Capital and largest city: Cuiabá

Government
  - Type: Unitary state
  - Governor: Otaviano Pivetta (Republicanos)
  - Vice Governor: Vacant
  - Senators: Jayme Campos (UNIÃO); Carlos Fávaro (PSD); Wellington Fagundes (PL)
  - Legislature: Legislative Assembly of Mato Grosso

Area
  - Total: 903,357 km^{2} (348,788 sq mi)
  - Rank: 3rd
- Highest elevation: 902 m (2,959 ft)

Population (2025)
  - Total: 3,893,659
  - Rank: 17th
  - Density: 4.31021/km^{2} (11.1634/sq mi)
  - Rank: 25th
- Demonym: Mato-grossense

GDP (2024)
  - Total: R$264.616 billion (US$49.104 billion)

HDI
  - Year: 2024
  - Category: 0.812 – very high (8th)
- Time zone: UTC-4 (BRT-1)
- Postal Code: 78000-000 to 78890-000
- ISO 3166 code: BR-MT
- Website: portal.mt.gov.br

Mato Grosso (Note: English: /ˈmætoʊ ˈɡroʊsoʊ/ MAT-oh GROH-soh, UK also /- ˈɡrɒsoʊ/ - GROS-oh, US also /ˈmɑːtoʊ ˈɡrɔːsoʊ/ MAH-toh GRAW-soh Brazilian Portuguese: [ˈmatu ˈɡɾosu].) (lit. 'Thick Bush') is one of the states of Brazil, the third largest by area, located in the Central-West region. The state has 1.66% of the Brazilian population and is responsible for 1.9% of the Brazilian GDP. Neighboring states (from west clockwise) are: Rondônia, Amazonas, Pará, Tocantins, Goiás and Mato Grosso do Sul. It is divided into 142 municipalities and covers an area of 903,357 square kilometers, consequently the state is roughly 82.2% of the size of its southwest neighbor, the nation of Bolivia.

A state with a flat landscape that alternates between vast chapadas and plain areas, Mato Grosso contains three main ecosystems: the Cerrado, the Pantanal and the Amazon rainforest. The Chapada dos Guimarães National Park, with its caves, grottoes, tracks, and waterfalls, is one of its tourist attractions. The extreme northwest of the state has a small part of the Amazonian forest. The Xingu Indigenous Park and the Araguaia River are in Mato Grosso. Farther south, the Pantanal, the world's largest wetland, is the habitat for nearly one thousand species of animals and many aquatic birds.

== Geography ==
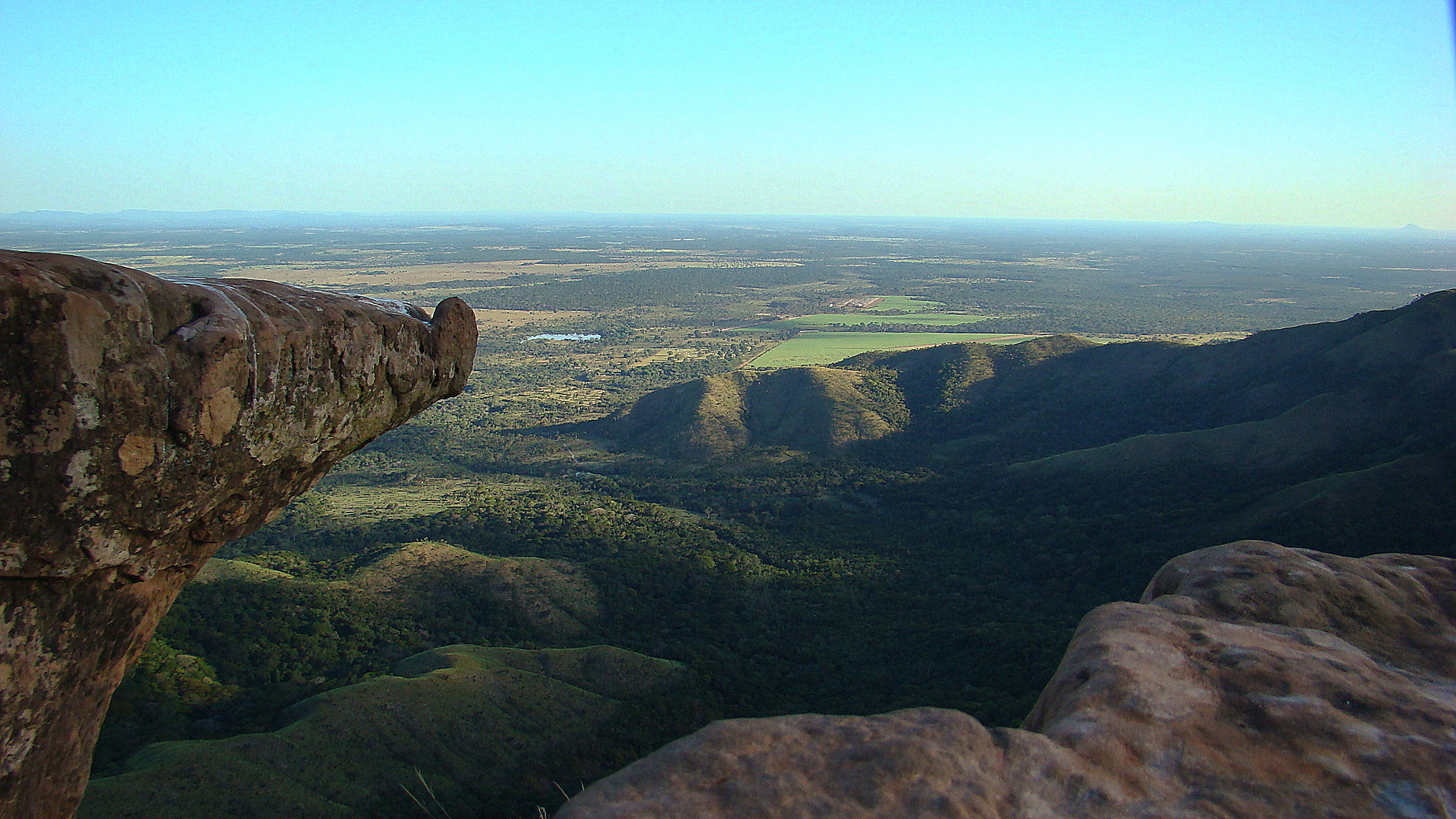
Chapada dos Guimarães National Park

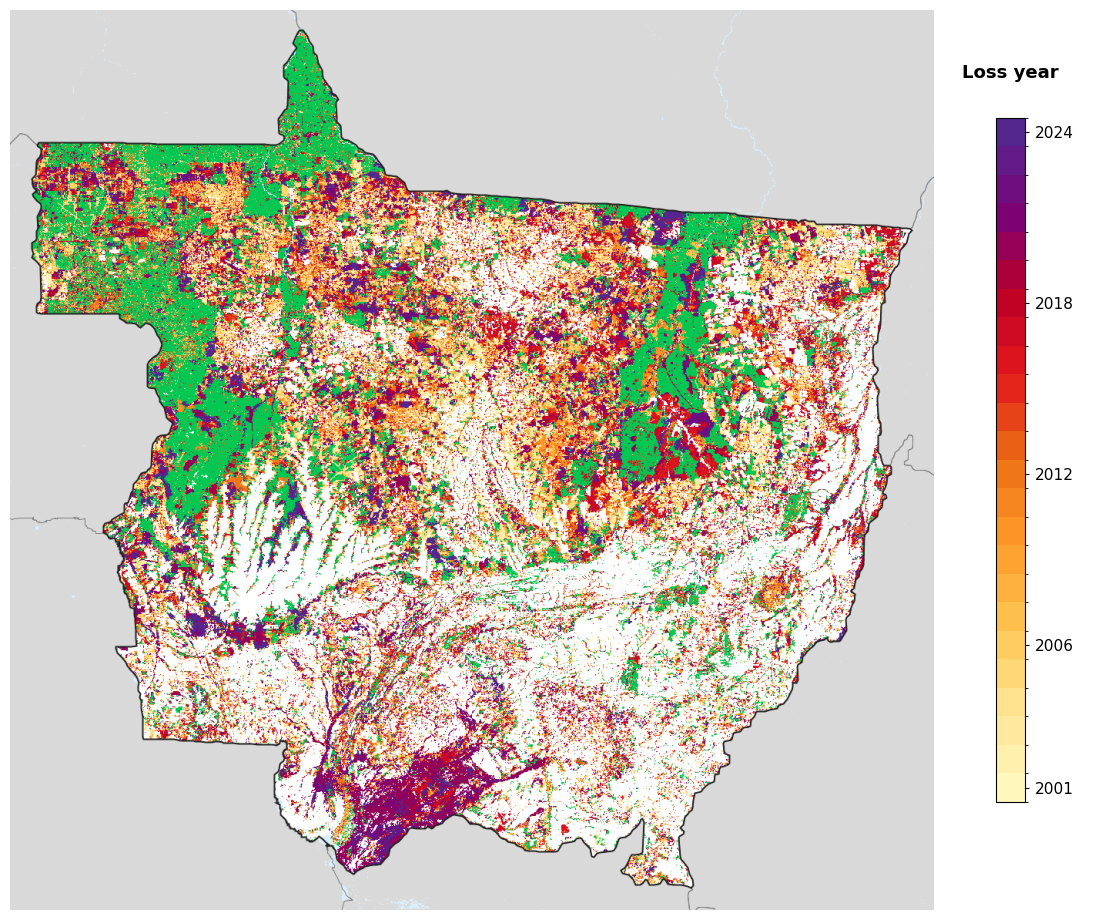
Tree-cover loss year in Mato Grosso, 2001-2024, from the Global Forest Change dataset.

The varied terrain of Mato Grosso includes cliffs, canyons, and waterfalls. It is home to the Chapada dos Guimarães National Park, its sandstone mountains have eroded into a remarkably varied vistas.

The biologically rich Pantanal, one of the world's largest wetland/prairie ecosystems, is also located within this state. The Paraguay basin is rich in the number and diversity of fish (around 230 species), a fascinating place for fishermen and scholars. In this basin are numerous species classified as "noble" in sport fishing, others, including ornamental species, are of great interest to aquarists and still others whose rarity has led to detailed research. The fishing industry in the Pantanal plays an important role in the region's economy and, for local people, fish is a staple food. The Pantanal has a habitat similar to the Everglades in Florida in the United States, although the Pantanal is much larger.

== History ==
The Bororo Indians live in the Mato Grosso area. As late as 1880, soldiers patrolled lands on the outskirts of Cuiabá, Mato Grosso's capital and largest city, to protect settlers from Bororo raids.

By the end of the 19th century, although severely reduced by disease and by warfare with explorers, slave traders, prospectors, settlers, and other indigenous groups, as many as five to 10 thousand Bororo continued to occupy central and eastern Mato Grosso, as well as western Goiás. The southwestern part of this state was ceded by Brazil to Bolivia in exchange for the then-Bolivian territory of Acre, according to the Treaty of Petrópolis in 1903.

This historically remote area attracted expeditions of exploration in the early 20th century that sought to find lost civilizations. A notable example was British Captain Percy Fawcett's expedition to find the Lost City of Z which he believed existed in the jungles of Brazil. Certain proponents of the Hollow Earth hypothesis speculated that the region had sites of access to the interior of the earth and its settlements.

In 1977, the state was split into two halves, and the neighboring state of Mato Grosso do Sul was created from the other part of its territory.

== Demographics ==
Historical population
Year	Pop.	±%
1872	60,417	—
1890	92,827	+53.6%
1900	118,025	+27.1%
1920	246,612	+108.9%
1940	193,625	−21.5%
1950	212,649	+9.8%
1960	330,610	+55.5%
1970	612,887	+85.4%
1980	1,169,812	+90.9%
1991	2,022,524	+72.9%
2000	2,505,245	+23.9%
2010	3,035,122	+21.2%
2022	3,658,649	+20.5%

Mato Grosso had a high rate of population growth in the 20th century due to timber, ranching and agricultural development. The state as a whole has one of the lowest population densities of any Brazilian state. According to the Brazilian Institute of Geography and Statistics (IBGE), 3,441,998 people resided in the state as of 2018. The population density was 3.8 inhabitants/km^{2}.

- Urbanization: 76.6% (2006)
- Population growth: 2.4% (1991–2000)
- Houses: 836,000 (2006)

Ethnically, the state includes a relatively high proportion of caboclos (persons of mixed European and Indian ancestry), as do other areas of interior Brazil. The last PNAD (National Research for Sample of Domiciles) census revealed the following numbers: 2,048,782 Brown (Mixed) people (56%); 1,181,590 White people (32.3%); 360,698 Black people (9.9%); 56,687 Amerindian people (1.5%); and 10,813 Asian people (0.3%). At the 2022 census, the most commonly nominated ethnic groups as a proportion of the total population were:

Ethnic composition as of the 2022 census
Race and Ethnicist y	Total
Pardo or Natives	56%
White	32.30%
Black	9.86%
Indigenous	1.55%
Yellow	0.30%

=== Largest cities ===
Largest cities or towns in Mato Grosso (2011 census by the Brazilian Institute of Geography and Statistics)
Rank		Mesoregion	Pop.	Rank		Mesoregion	Pop.
1	Cuiabá	Centro-Sul	556,298	11	Lucas do Rio Verde	Norte	47,570
2	Várzea Grande	Centro-Sul	255,448	12	Pontes e Lacerda	Sudoeste	41,741
3	Rondonópolis	Sudeste	198,949	13	Juína	Norte	39,350
4	Sinop	Norte	116,013	14	Juara	Norte	36,168
5	Cáceres	Centro-Sul	88,427	15	Barra do Bugres	Norte	33,034
6	Tangará da Serra	Sudoeste	84,076	16	Campo Verde	Centro-Sul	32,692
7	Sorriso	Norte	68,894	17	Guarantã do Norte	Norte	32,524
8	Barra do Garças	Nordeste	56,903	18	Nova Mutum	Centro-Sul	32,134
9	Primavera do Leste	Sudeste	53,003	19	Poconé	Centro-Sul	31,856
10	Alta Floresta	Norte	49,331	20	Peixoto de Azevedo	Centro-Sul	31,169

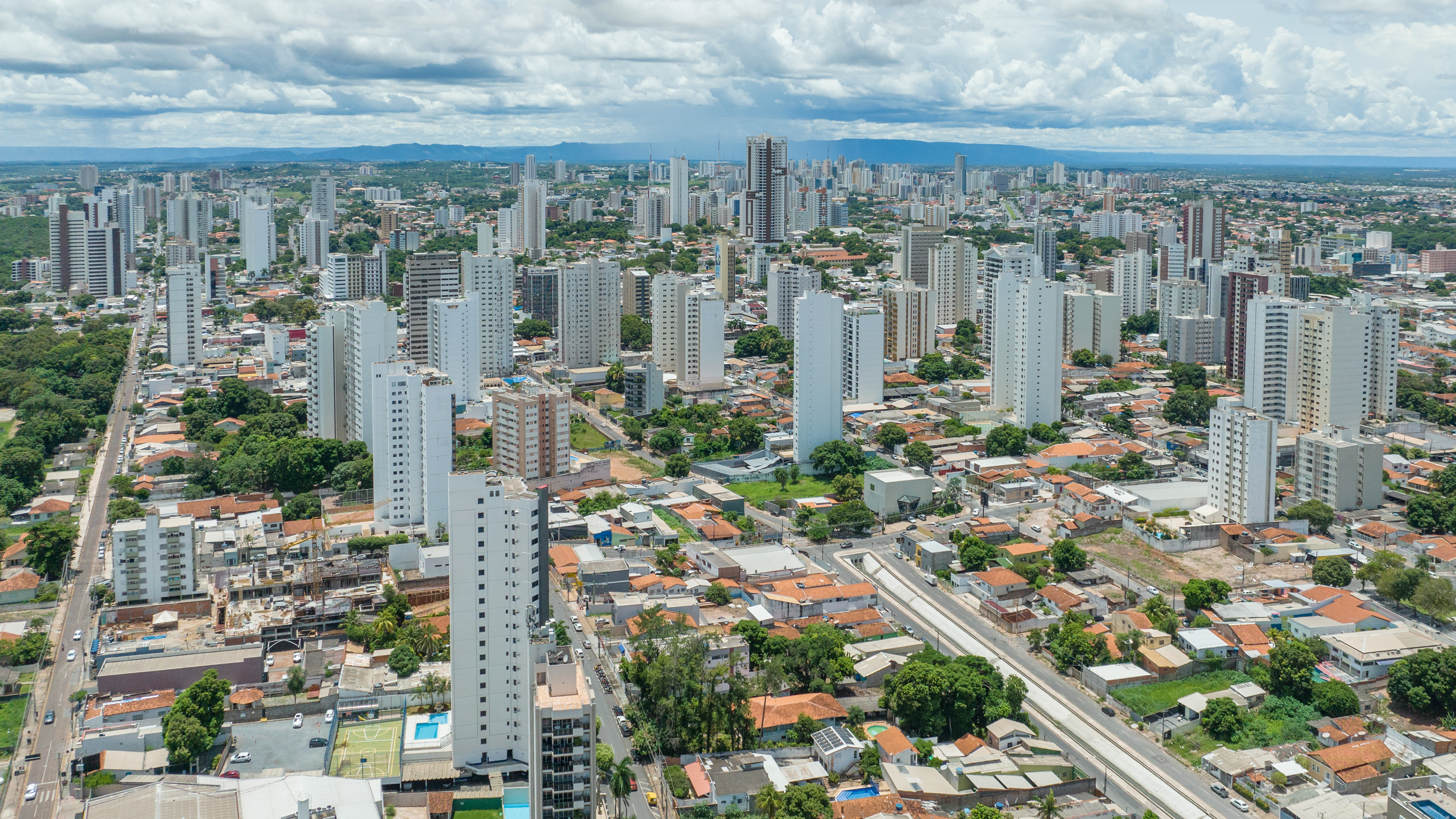
Cuiabá, the capital and financial center of the state, in 2022.

=== Education ===
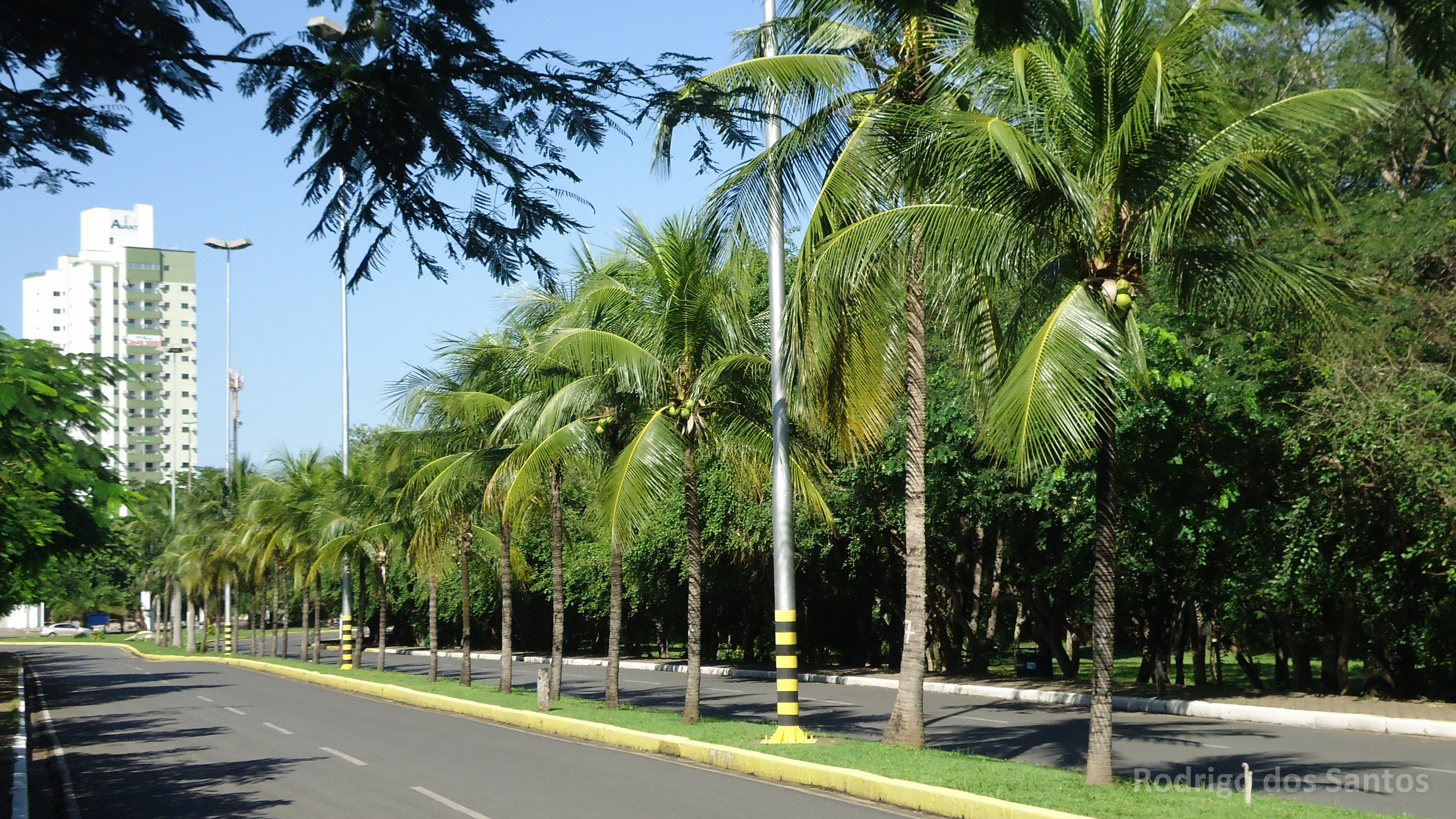
Campus of the Federal University of Mato Grosso in Cuiabá

Portuguese is the official national language and the primary language taught in schools. English and Spanish are also taught as part of the official high school curriculum.

More than 58 universities are located in the state of Mato Grosso.

Cuiabá is home to the following universities:

- Federal University of Mato Grosso (UFMT);
- Mato Grosso State University (Unemat);
- Universidade de Cuiabá (Unic).

Rondonópolis also has the Federal University of Rondonópolis (UFR), formerly a part of UFMT until 2018.

== Economy ==
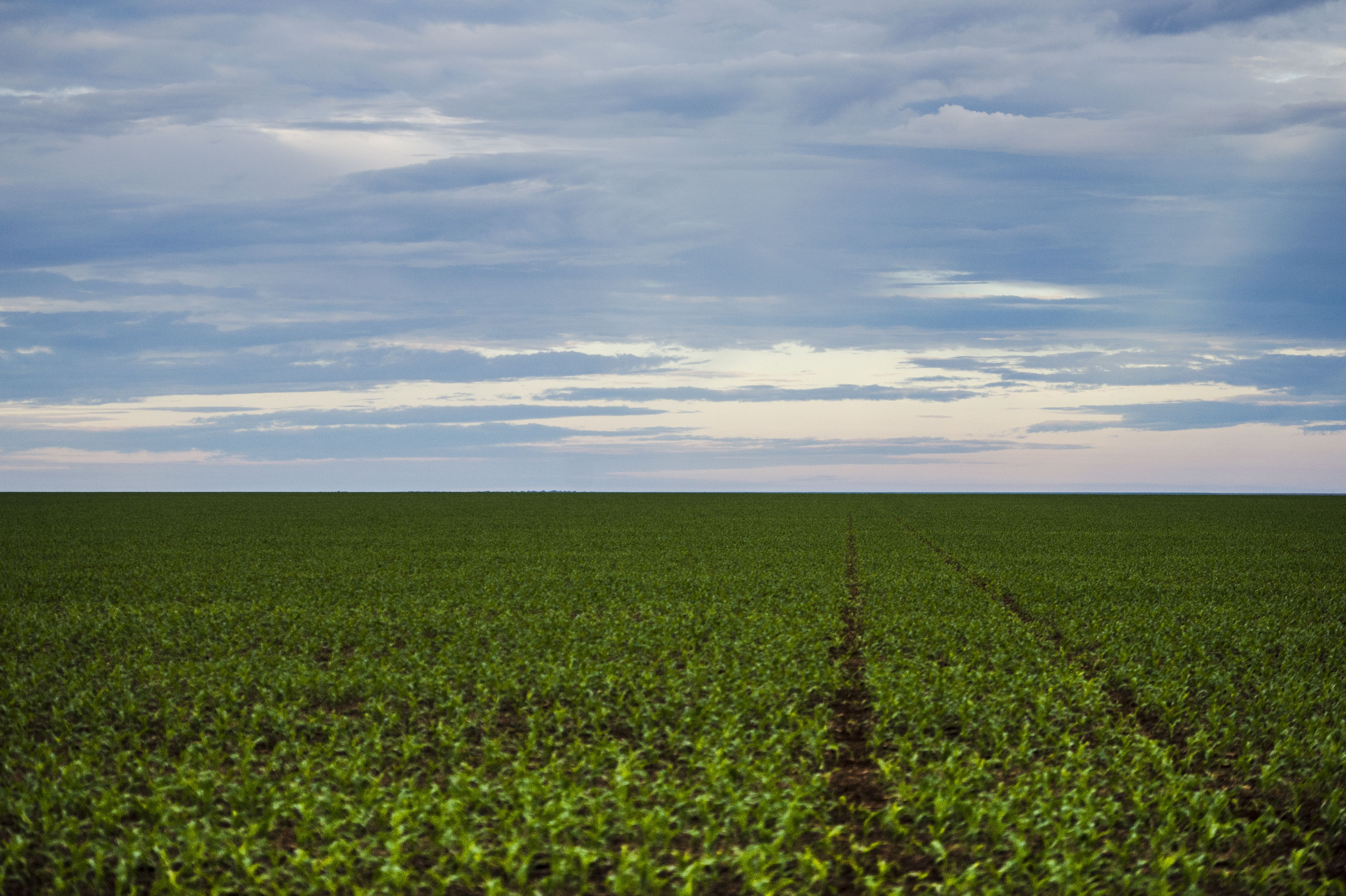
Soy plantation in Brasnorte

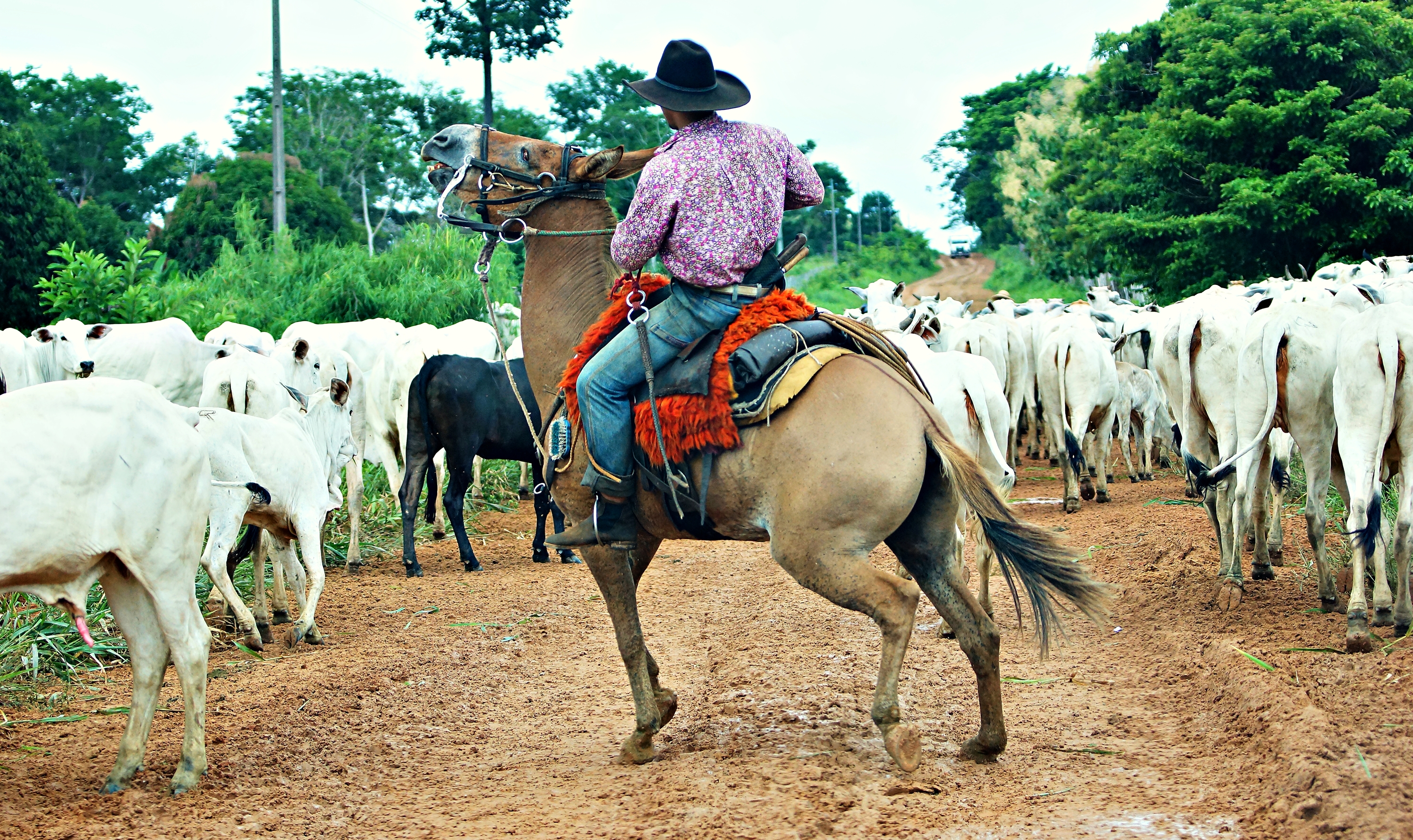
Cattle in Mato Grosso

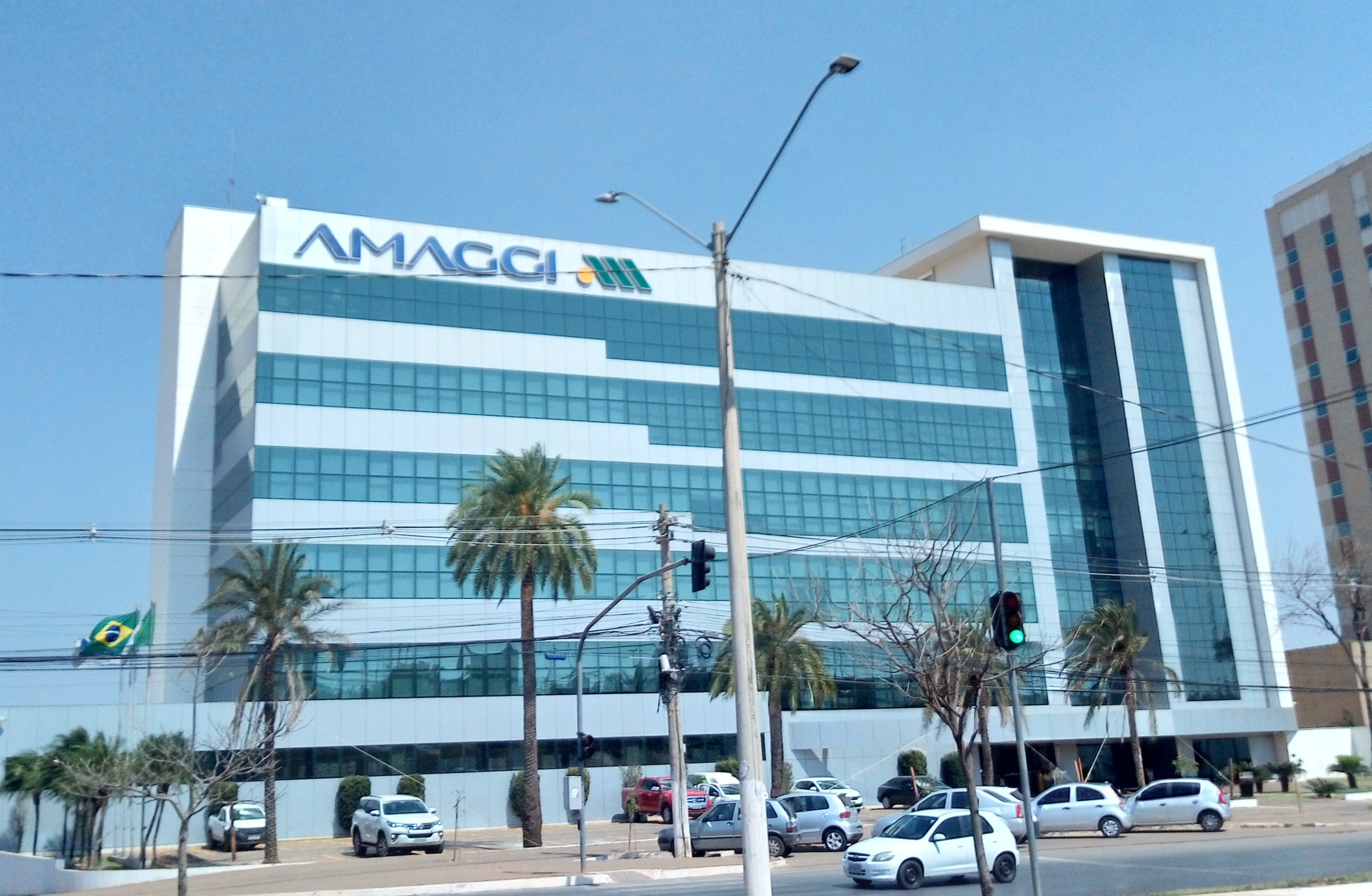
Amaggi Group Headquarters in Cuiabá

Agriculture is the largest component of the state's GDP at 40.8%, followed by the service sector at 40.2%. The industrial sector represents 19% of the GDP (2004). Mato Grosso's major exports include soybeans (83%), wood (5.6%), meats (4.8%), and cotton (3.3%) (2002).

The state's share of the Brazilian economy is 1.8% (2014). In 2020, Mato Grosso was the leader in national grain production, with 28.0%. It's the largest producer of soy in Brazil, with 26.9% of the total produced in 2020 (33.0 million tons); the largest producer of maize in the country; the largest producer of cotton in Brazil, with around 65% of national production (1.8 out of the 2.8 million tons harvested in the country); the sixth largest producer of sugarcane in the country, 16 million tons harvested in the 2019/20 harvest; and the third largest producer of beans, with 10.5% of Brazilian production. In sunflowers, the state was the largest national producer in 2019, with 60,000 tons. In cassava production, Brazil produced a total of 17.6 million tons in 2018. Mato Grosso produced 287,000 tons that year.

In 2009, the cattle herd from Mato Grosso reached the mark of 30 million cattle, the largest cattle herd in the country, representing almost 14% of national production alone. In 2018, Mato Grosso was the fifth largest pork producer in the country, with a herd of around 2.5 million animals.

In 2017, Mato Grosso had 1.15% of the national mineral participation (fifth place in the country). Mato Grosso had production of gold (8.3 tons at a value of R$1 billion) and tin (536 tons at a value of R$16 million). In addition, in gemstones, the state is the second largest national producer of diamond, having extracted 49,000 carats in the year 2017. The city of Juína is the main one in this activity in the state. The state also has a small production of sapphire and jasper.

Mato Grosso had an industrial GDP of R$17.0 billion in 2017, equivalent to 1.4% of the national industry. It employs 141,121 workers in the industry. The main industrial sectors are: Construction (32.0%), Food (27.9%), Industrial Services of Public Utility, such as Electricity and Water (18.6%), Beverages (4.5%) and Oil Products Oil and Biofuels (3.9%). These five sectors concentrate 86.9% of the state's industry.

=== Statistics ===
- Vehicles: 1,614,797 (January 2015)
- Mobile phones: 4,500,000 (January 2015)
- Telephones: 527,000 (April 2007)
- Cities: 142 (2025)

== Infrastructure ==
=== Roads ===
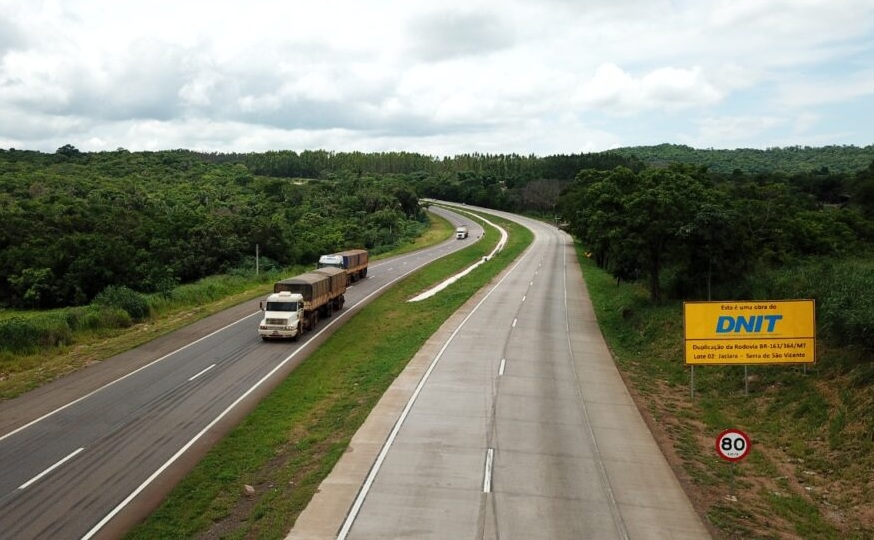
BR-163 / BR-364, duplicate stretch between Cuiabá and Rondonópolis

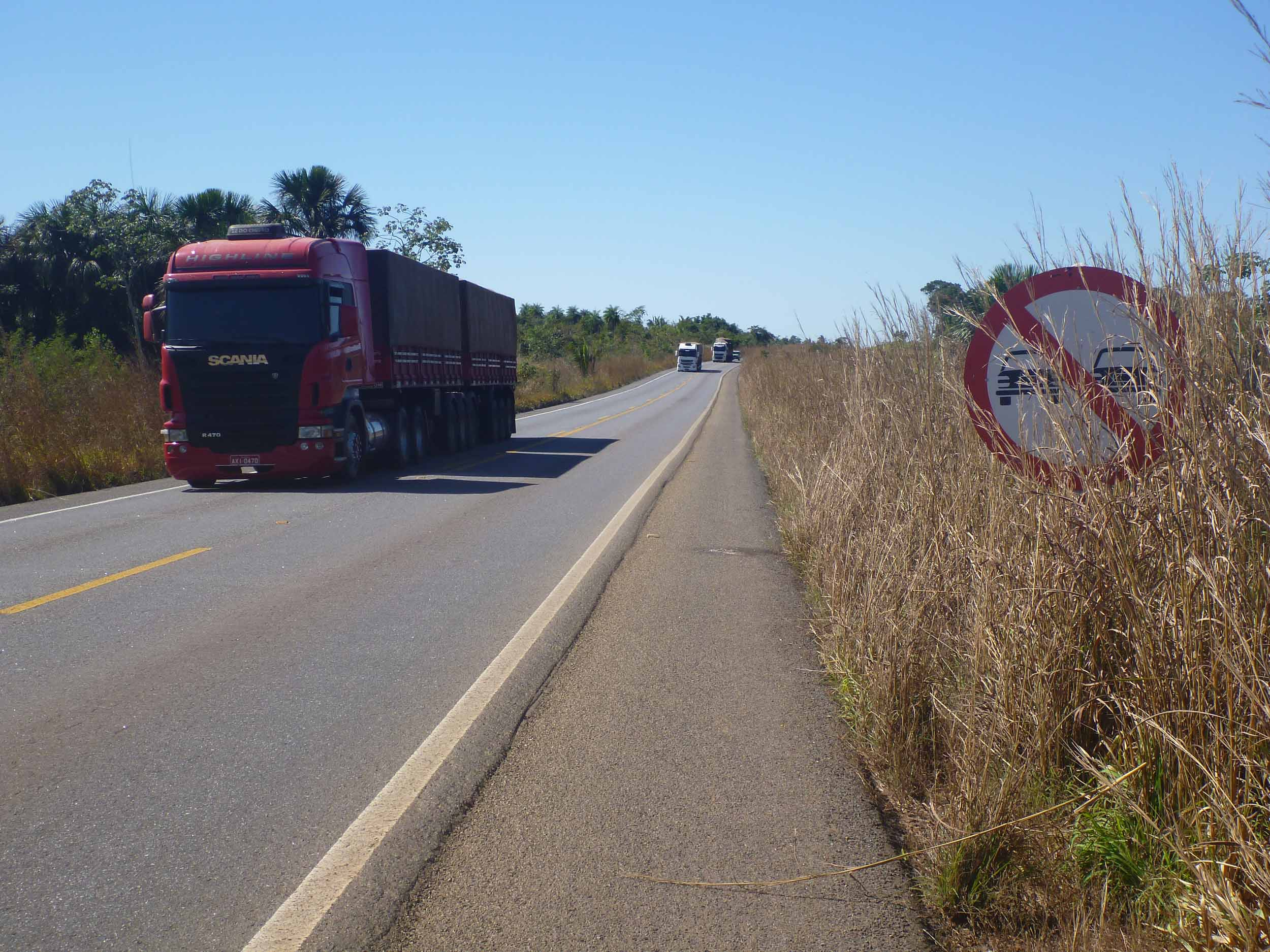
BR-174 highway in Mato Grosso

Mato Grosso had, in 2020, 141,171 km of municipal roads; on the roads of the state of Mato Grosso there were 22,399 km of unpaved roads, 7,281 km of paved roads and 81 km of duplicated highways. In the federal road network, there were 3,649 km of roads, including 330 km of duplicated highways. Mato Grosso, despite being a more recently occupied state, already has a 2-lane highway in each direction connecting the capital Cuiabá to one of the largest cities in the state, Rondonópolis, then to the border with Mato Grosso do Sul.

Some of the main roads are:

- BR-070
- BR-173
- BR-174
- BR-158
- BR-163
- BR-197
- BR-242
- BR-252
- BR-364
- MT-100
- MT-358

=== Airports ===
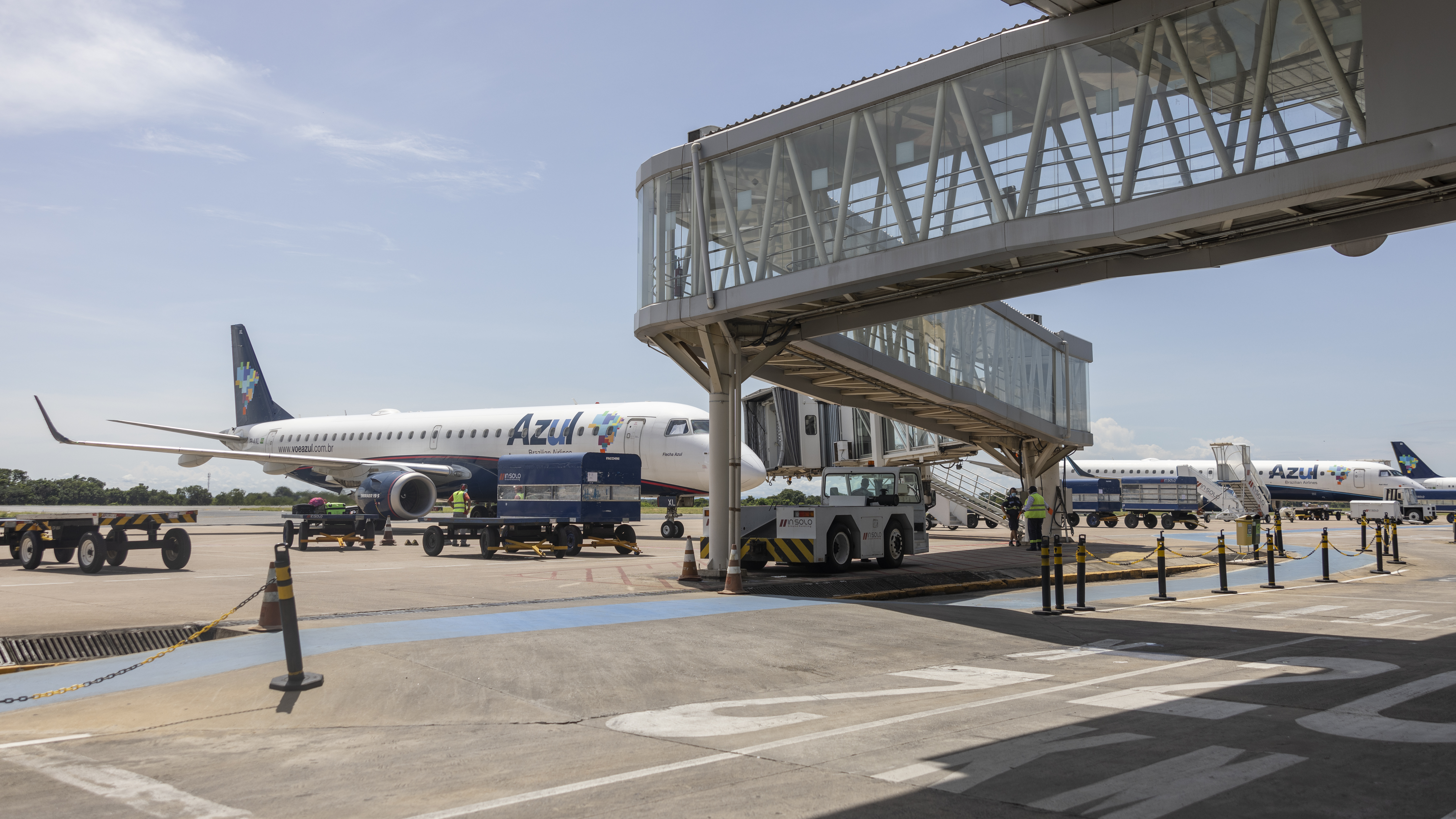
Marechal Rondon International Airport in Várzea Grande

Marechal Rondon International Airport, located 10 km (6.2 mi) from the city center of Cuiabá, in the suburb of Várzea Grande, started receiving international flights in 1996. It now serves more than half a million passengers a year.

The runway at Marechal Rondon was opened to traffic in 1956. In February 1975, Infraero took over the airport's administration and began various upgrades to meet the needs of the airport complex.

=== Railways ===
The 1,600 mm (5 ft 3 in) Northern Brazil Railway connects Mato Grosso with the state of São Paulo and sea ports. Rumo Logística only operates freight trains on the line, which runs as far inland as Rondonópolis. An extension northward to Cuiabá and Lucas do Rio Verde is planned as of 2021.

It crosses the large Rollemberg–Vuolo Bridge over the Paraná River when passing into Mato Grosso do Sul.

== Flag ==
Flag of Mato Grosso

The state flag has similar colors to the flag of Brazil, with blue symbolizing the sky, green vegetation, and white standing for peace. The star is yellow to symbolize the gold which attracted the first settlers. The flag was adopted by Decree No. 2 of January 31, 1890, just a few days after the adoption of the national flag. The Mato Grosso state flag was abolished by Law No. 1.046 of October 8, 1929, but reinstated by Article 140 of the Constitution of the State of Mato Grosso on July 11, 1947.

== Tourism and recreation ==
=== Alta Floresta ===
Fishing in the Teles Pires, São Benedito and Azul rivers is productive practically all year long.

=== Chapada dos Guimarães ===
The largest sandstone cavern in Brazil, Aroe Jari, extends nearly 1,550 m (5,090 ft), and several prehistoric inscriptions can be found inside.

=== North Pantanal ===
The Pantanal's backbone is the Paraguay River, which cuts through the region from north to south. The Miranda, Aquidauna, Taquari, and Cuiabá rivers flow into the Paraguay River. From October to April, the high waters reveal outsized lakes, bays, river branches, and outlets.

The Transpantaneira Highway connects the town of Poconé to Jofre Port, along the Cuiabá River bank. It is a dirt road with 126 wooden bridges, and extends for 149 km (93 mi). On the way, it is possible to observe wild animals, especially alligators, capybaras, and birds, among other wild animals.

=== Águas Quentes State Park ===
The 1,487 ha (3,670 acres) Águas Quentes State Park, the first protected area in Mato Grosso, is known for the healing powers of its thermal waters.

=== Lagoa Azul State Park ===
The Gruta da Lagoa Azul State Park (Portuguese: Parque Estadual Gruta da Lagoa Azul) is a state park in the municipality of Nobres, Mato Grosso, with an area of 12,513 ha (30,920 acres). Its primary attraction is a limestone cave with a pool of blue water and unusual cave formations. These have suffered from vandalism, causing the cave to be closed until measures to protect it could be implemented. The blue lagoon cave holds a pool of blue water formed from underground water of the Saloba River. The main entrance is filled in part by the water. The hall contains columns over 5 m (16 ft) in size and 1 m (3 ft 3 in) in diameter. There may be archaeological remains in the cave. The park has several other limestone caves. It is covered with deciduous forests, and is home to howler monkeys, tapirs, jaguars, and macaws.

== Gallery ==
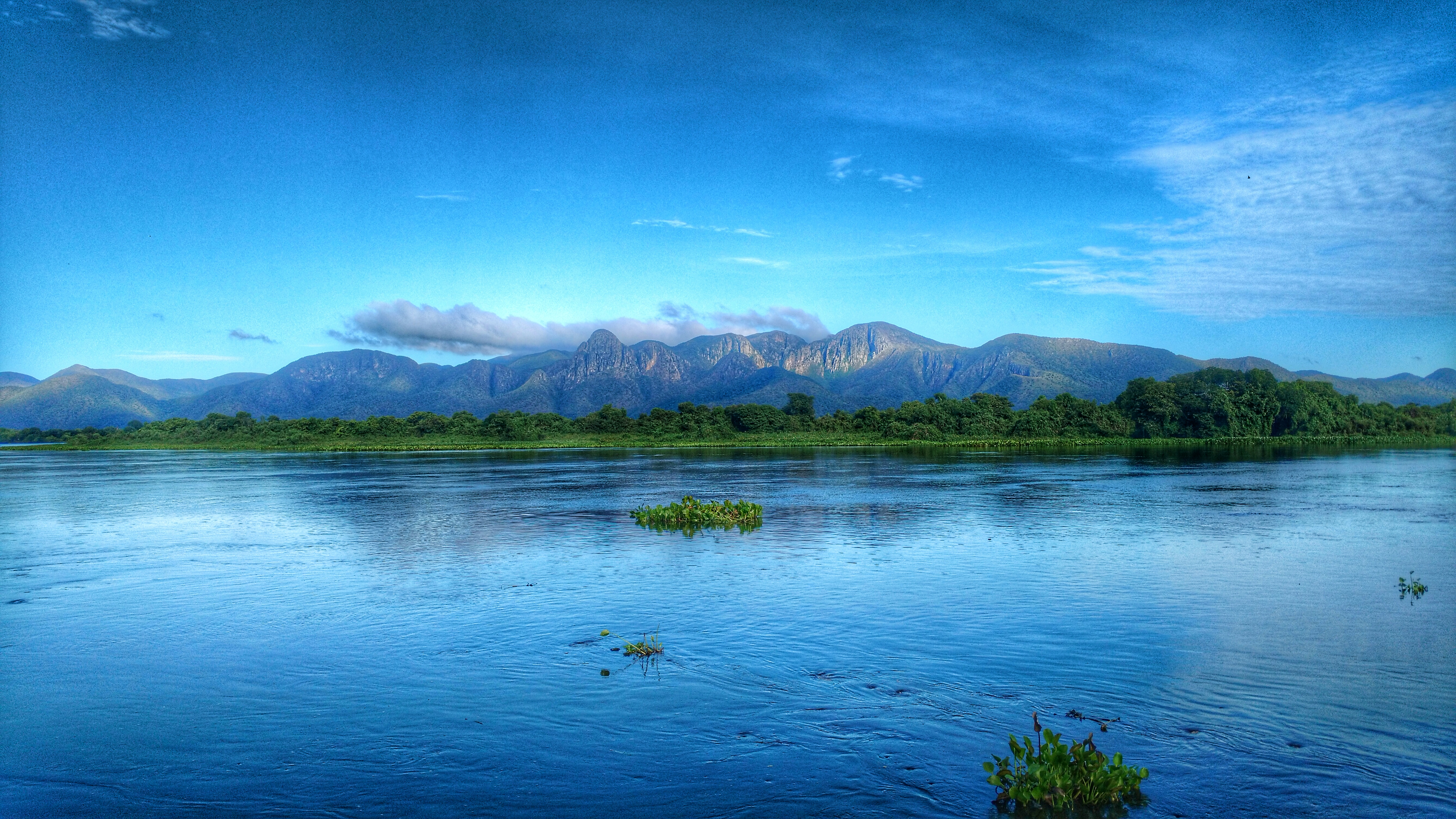
Paraguay River

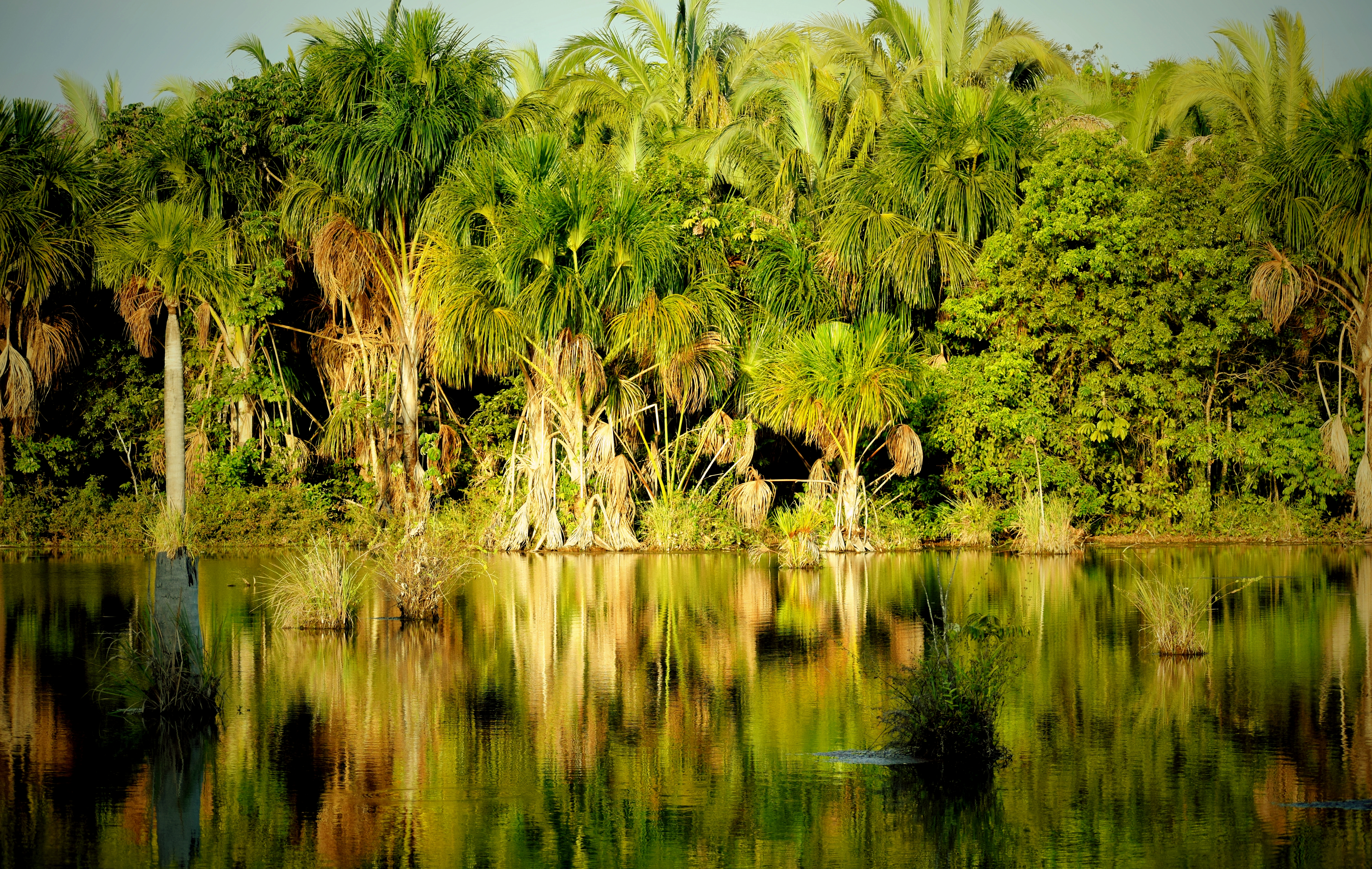
Lagoon of Araras

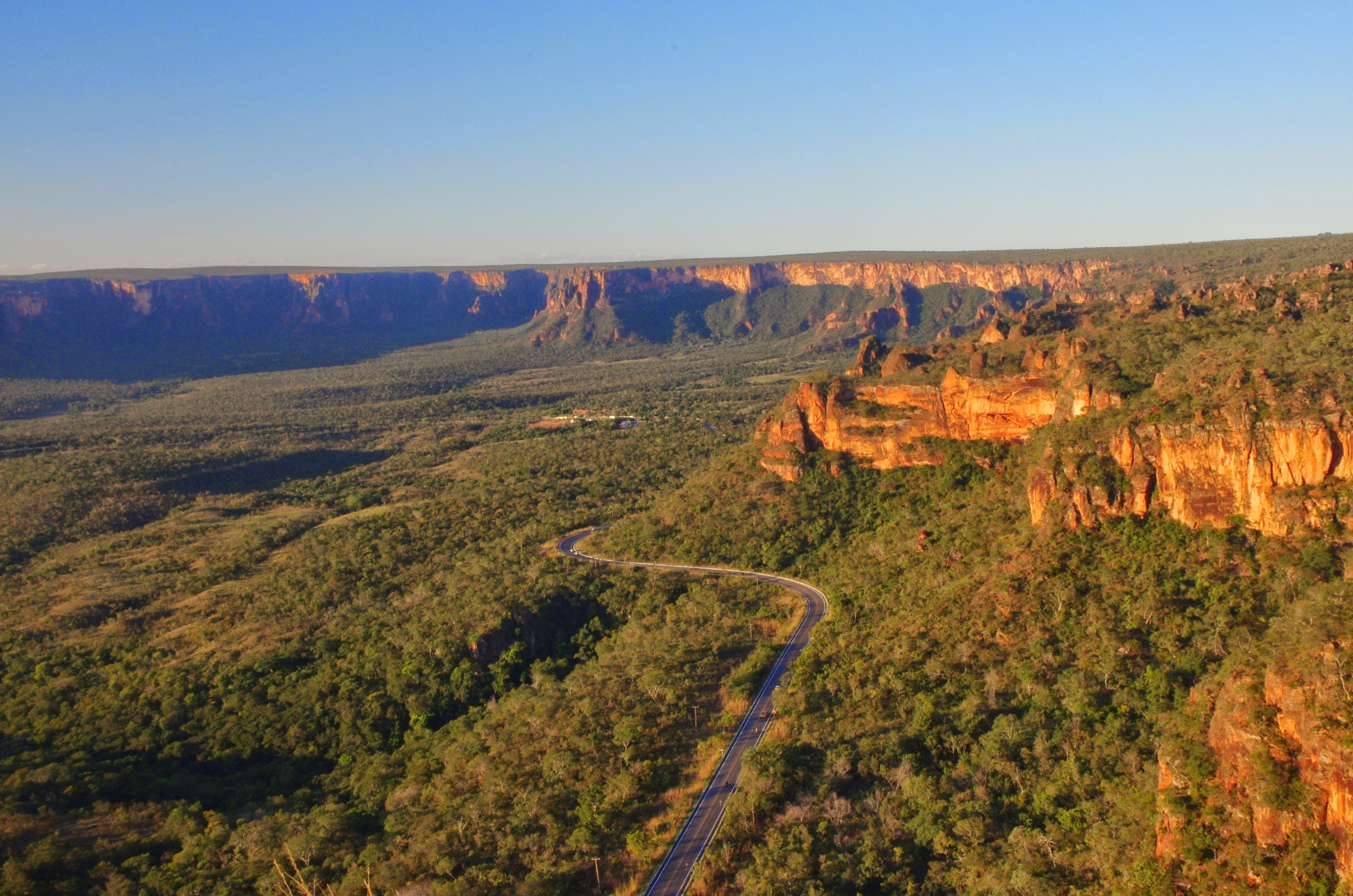
Canyons of Chapada dos Guimarães National Park

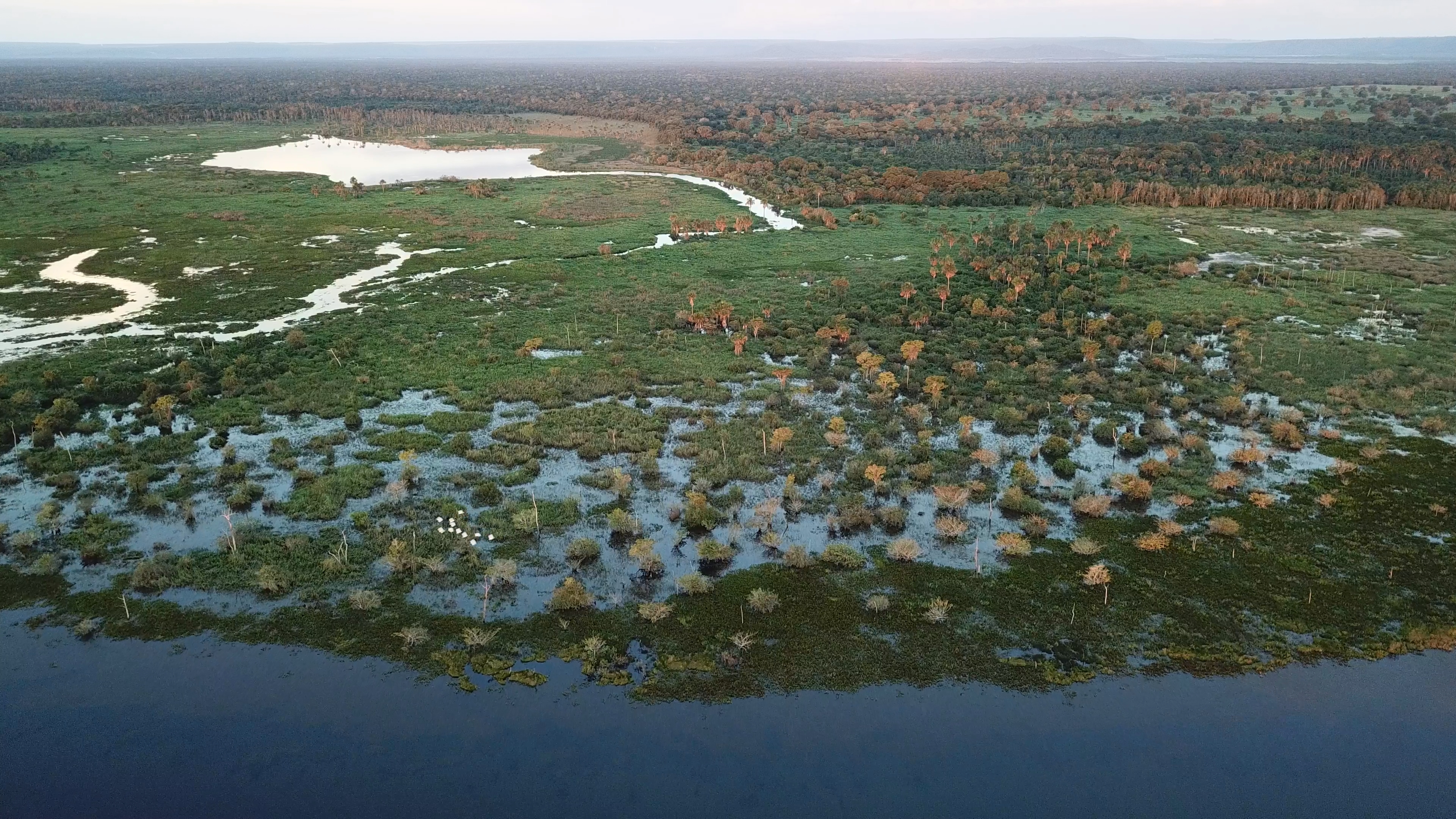
Pantanal in Mato Grosso

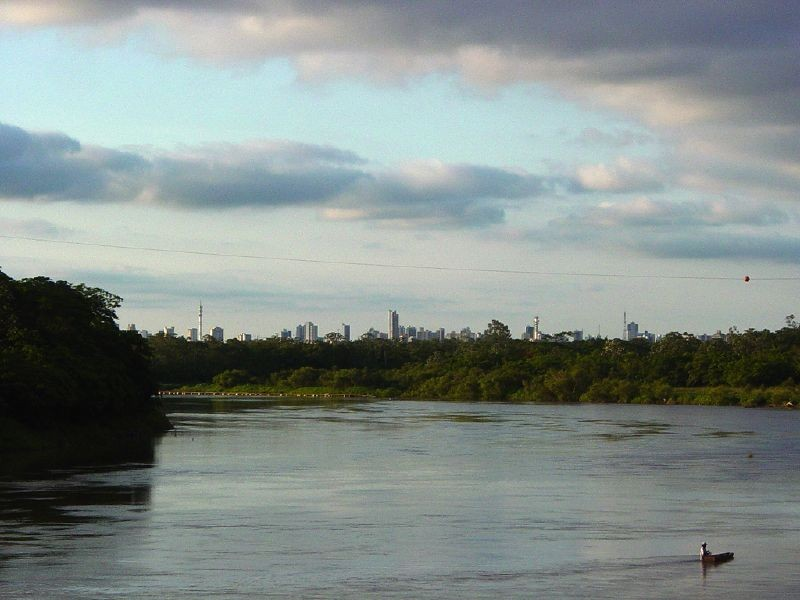
Cuiabá River

== Sports ==
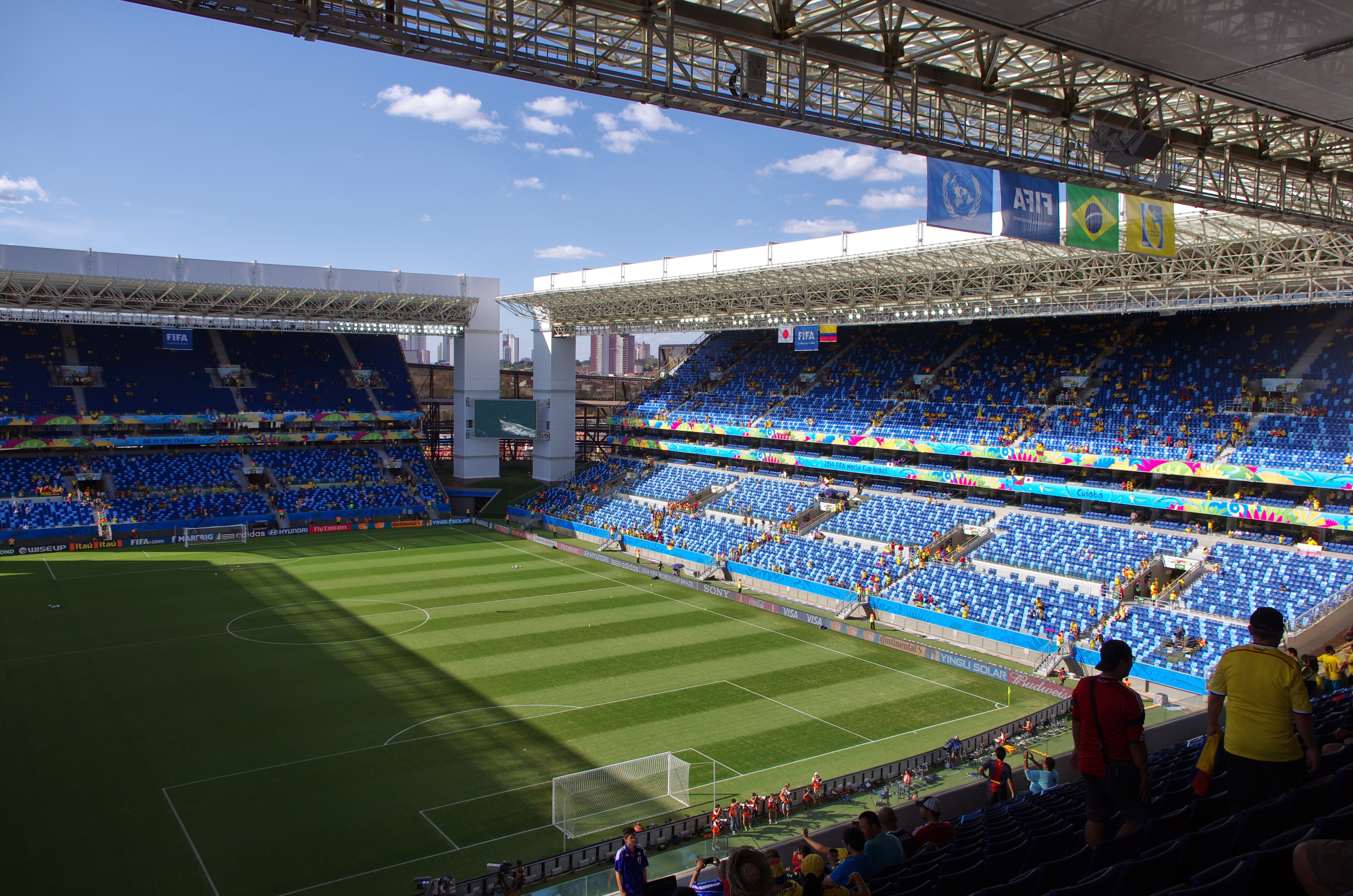
Arena Pantanal in Cuiabá

Cuiabá was one of 12 cities chosen to host the games of the 2014 FIFA World Cup, which took place in Brazil.

In the state were born the medalists of the World Championships Felipe Lima in swimming and David Moura in judo, in addition to the world champions of futsal Vinícius and Lenísio.

== See also ==
- List of Mato Grosso state symbols
- List of municipalities in Mato Grosso

== Sources ==
- Parque Estadual Gruta da Lagoa Azul (in Portuguese), Via Rural, archived from the original on 2016-08-06
- PES Gruta da Lagoa Azul (in Portuguese), ISA: Instituto Socioambiental
