= Federal University of Mato Grosso =

University in Brazil

Coordinates: 15.6087°S 56.0637°W

- Universidade Federal de Mato Grosso
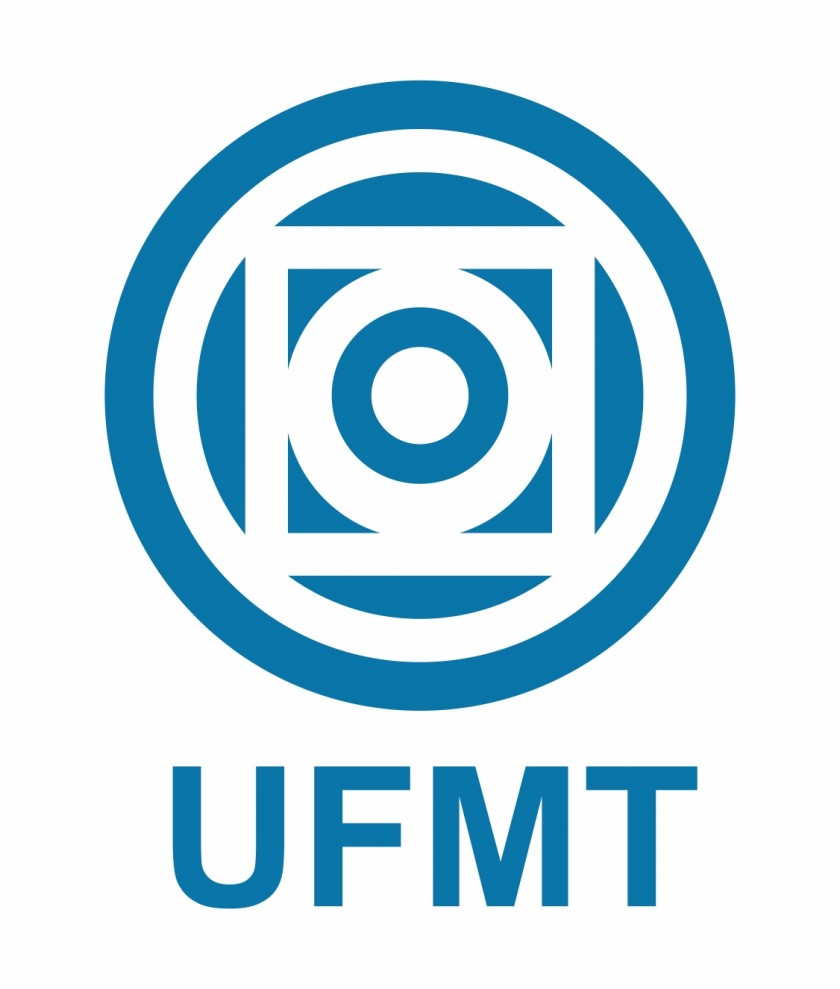
- Other name: UFMT
- Motto: Virtus et sapientia
- Type: Public, (Federal)
- Established: December 10, 1970
- Rector: Marluce Souza e Silva
- Students: 21,301 (2019)
- Location: Cuiabá (main campus), Mato Grosso, Brazil
- Campus: Urban, rural
- Website: http://www.ufmt.br/

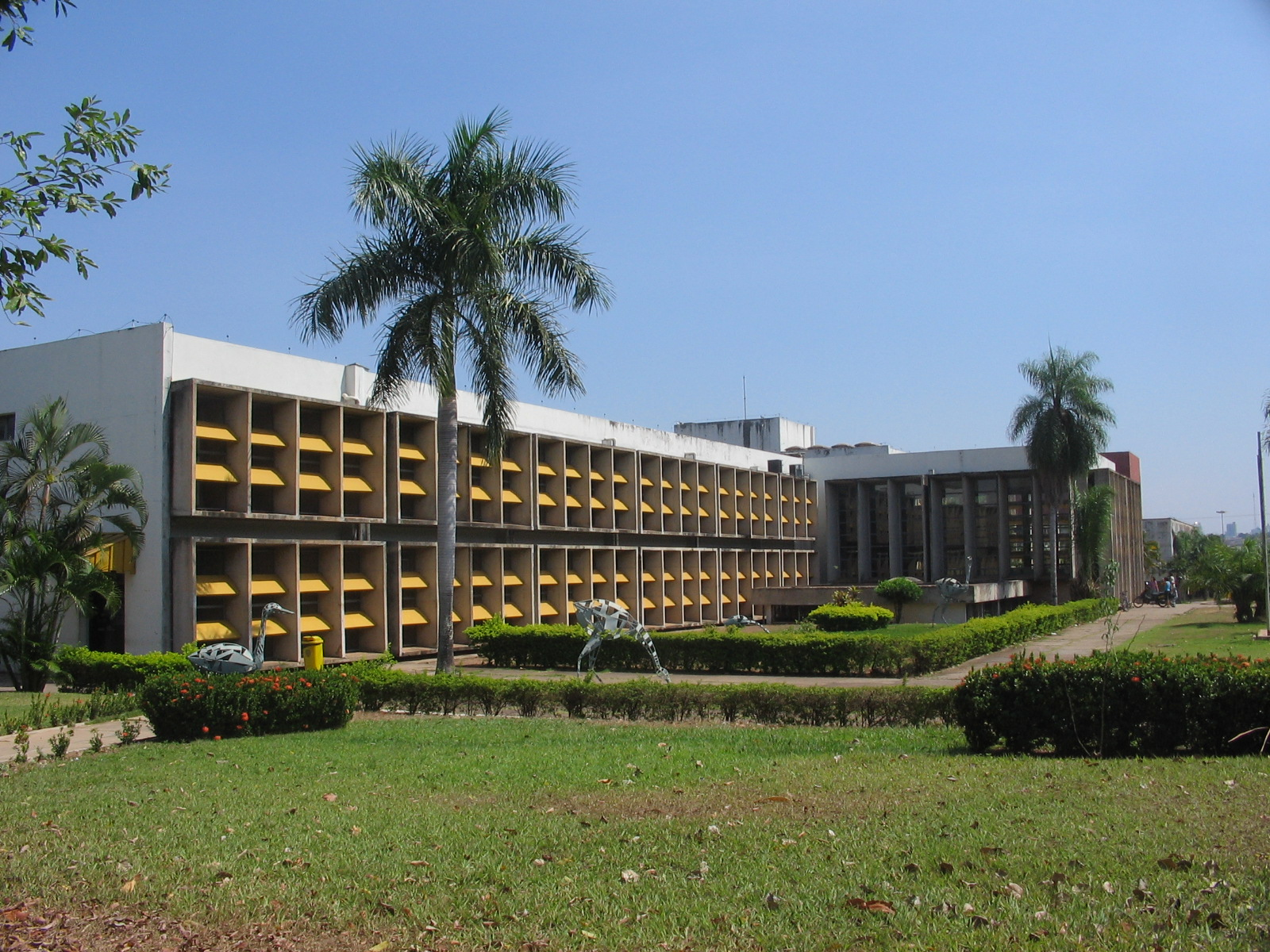
Rectorate building in Cuiabá

The Federal University of Mato Grosso (Portuguese: Universidade Federal de Mato Grosso, UFMT) is a public university in the state of Mato Grosso, Brazil. Responsible for serving the entire state, its main campus is in the capital city of Cuiabá. Smaller campuses are located in Barra do Garças, Pontal do Araguaia, Sinop, and Várzea Grande, while the former campus at Rondonópolis is now the Federal University of Rondonópolis, split off in 2018.

A total of 21,301 students were enrolled across all five campuses in 2019. The contemporary institution was created by a federal law passed in 1970, combining the Federal Faculty of Law of Cuiabá (founded in 1934), and the Institute of Sciences and Letters of Cuiabá (founded in 1966). Today UFMT is a comprehensive university offering degrees and diplomas, and producing research, in many fields. The medical and health science schools are affiliated with the Hospital Universitário Júlio Müller, the only federally-funded hospital in the state.

Its library is the largest in the state of Mato Grosso, having over 200,000 volumes as of 2012.

In 2019, Folha de São Paulo ranked UFMT 33rd nationally, with its programs in Agronomy, Environmental Engineering, and Education ranked in the top 20.

== See also ==
- List of federal universities of Brazil
