= American Experience season 30 =

American Experience
- Season 30
- No. of episodes: 9

Release
- Original network: PBS
- Original release: January 9 – October 16, 2018

Season chronology
- ← Previous; Season 29 Next → Season 31

Season thirty of the television program American Experience aired on the PBS network in the United States on January 9, 2018 and concluded on October 16, 2018. The season contained nine new episodes, including the retitled episode "The Island Murder", a rebroadcast of the 2005 film, "The Massie Affair". The episode "The Chinese Exclusion Act" aired as a "special presentation" of the American Experience program. The season began with the film Into the Amazon.

== Episodes ==
No. overall	No. in season	Title	Directed by	Written by	Original release date
327	1	"Into the Amazon"	John Maggio	John Maggio	January 9, 2018
A documentary of the expedition led by former President Theodore Roosevelt and Brazilian explorer Cândido Rondon to the River of Doubt in 1913-14. Narrated by Oliver Platt. Voices: Alec Baldwin as Theodore Roosevelt, Wagner Moura as Cândido Rondon, and Jake Lacy as Kermit Roosevelt.
328	2	"The Secret of Tuxedo Park"	Rob Rapley	Rob Rapley	January 16, 2018
Narrated by Campbell Scott.
329	3	"The Gilded Age"	Sarah Colt	Mark Zwonitzer	February 6, 2018
Narrated by Oliver Platt.
330	4	"The Bombing of Wall Street"	Susan Bellows	Susan Bellows	February 13, 2018
A documentary about the unsolved 1920 Wall Street bombing. Narrated by Oliver Platt.
331	5	"The Island Murder"	Mark Zwonitzer	Mark Zwonitzer	April 17, 2018
Note: The episode originally aired on April 18, 2005 as "The Massie Affair". Narrated by Blair Brown.
332	6	"The Chinese Exclusion Act"	Ric Burns & Li-Shin Yu	Teleplay by : Ric Burns; Story by : Ric Burns, Robin Espinola & Li-Shin Yu	May 29, 2018
A film about the Chinese Exclusion Act. Voices: Joel de la Fuente, Josh Hamilton, Russell Wong. Note: The episode aired as a "special presentation" of the American Experience program.
333	7	"The Circus (Part 1)"	Sharon Grimberg	Sharon Grimberg	October 8, 2018
Narrated by Michael Murphy.
334	8	"The Circus (Part 2)"	Sharon Grimberg	Sharon Grimberg	October 9, 2018
Narrated by Michael Murphy.
335	9	"The Eugenics Crusade"	Michelle Ferrari	Michelle Ferrari	October 16, 2018
A film about eugenics in the United States. Narrated by Corey Stoll.
