= Death by Lightning =

2025 historical drama miniseries

- Promotional poster
- Created by: Mike Makowsky
- Based on: Destiny of the Republic: A Tale of Madness, Medicine and the Murder of a President by Candice Millard
- Directed by: Matt Ross
- Starring: Michael Shannon; Matthew Macfadyen; Betty Gilpin; Shea Whigham; Bradley Whitford; Nick Offerman
- Composer: Ramin Djawadi
- Country of origin: United States
- Original language: English
- No. of seasons: 1
- No. of episodes: 4

Production
- Executive producers: Matt Ross; Mike Makowsky; Bernadette Caulfield; David Benioff; D. B. Weiss
- Cinematography: Adriano Goldman
- Running time: 47–66 minutes
- Production companies: BLB; Slater Hall Pictures; Pixie Skye

Original release
- Network: Netflix
- Release: November 6, 2025

Death by Lightning is an American historical drama miniseries created by Mike Makowsky and based on the 2011 book Destiny of the Republic by Candice Millard. It stars Michael Shannon as United States President James A. Garfield and Matthew Macfadyen as his assassin Charles J. Guiteau. The four-episode series premiered on November 6, 2025, on Netflix. It received widespread acclaim from critics, with particular praise for the performances, and was named one of the best television programs of the year by the American Film Institute.

== Premise ==
The series depicts the election and presidency of James A. Garfield, the 20th United States President, including his anti-corruption and pro-civil rights stances, as well as how his path crossed with Charles J. Guiteau, a deluded admirer, who ended up shooting him, leading to Garfield's death.

== Cast and characters ==
=== Main ===
- Michael Shannon as James A. Garfield
- Matthew Macfadyen as Charles J. Guiteau
- Betty Gilpin as Lucretia Garfield
- Shea Whigham as Roscoe Conkling
- Bradley Whitford as James G. Blaine
- Nick Offerman as Chester A. Arthur

=== Supporting ===
- Paula Malcomson as Franny Scoville
- Alistair Petrie as John Sherman
- Ben Miles as George Scoville
- Laura Marcus as Mollie Garfield
- Archie Fisher as Joe Brown
- Stuart Milligan as George F. Hoar
- David Nykl as Levi Morton
- Richard Rycroft as Spurlock
- Michael Carter as James Joy
- Dominic Applewhite as W.A.M. Grier
- Andrew Hefler as Tom Platt
- Daniel Gosling as John Foster
- Vondie Curtis-Hall as Frederick Douglass
- Tuppence Middleton as Kate Chase Sprague
- Bronagh Waugh as Myrna
- Barry Shabaka Henley as Blanche Bruce
- Nicholas Woodeson as Charles D.A. Loeffler
- Christine Grace Szarko as Susan Ann Edson
- Daniel Betts as John Humphrey Noyes
- Željko Ivanek as Doctor Willard Bliss
- Shaun Parkes as Dr. Charles Purvis
- Kyle Soller as Robert Todd Lincoln
- Richard Rankin as Alexander Graham Bell
- Alfie Tempest as Irvin Garfield

== Episodes ==
No.	Title	Directed by	Written by	Original release date
1	"The Man from Ohio"	Matt Ross	Mike Makowsky	November 6, 2025
2	"Party Faithful"	Matt Ross	Mike Makowsky	November 6, 2025
3	"Casus Belli"	Matt Ross	Mike Makowsky	November 6, 2025
4	"Destiny of the Republic"	Matt Ross	Mike Makowsky	November 6, 2025

== Production ==
=== Development ===
The series was announced in February 2024, with Michael Shannon cast to play Garfield, and Matthew Macfadyen to play Guiteau. Shannon was keen to play Garfield as he himself did not know anything about the man. Macfadyen compared his interpretation of Guiteau to the Pixar villain Syndrome. Matt Ross was set to direct all episodes of the series. Later that month, Nick Offerman and Betty Gilpin joined the cast, as Chester A. Arthur and Lucretia Garfield, respectively. In May, Bradley Whitford and Shea Whigham were added, with Stephen McKinley Henderson, Paula Malcomson and Tuppence Middleton joining in recurring roles. Laura Marcus was added in July. In October, additional castings were announced, including Barry Shabaka Henley (replacing McKinley Henderson in his role), Vondie Curtis-Hall and Željko Ivanek.

Filming began in Budapest on July 1, 2024, and wrapped in October of the same year.

=== Music ===
It was announced in October 2025 that composer Ramin Djawadi would be scoring the series.

No.	Title	Length
1.	"Prove My Worth"	1:05
2.	"The Man from Ohio"	2:35
3.	"Daily Theocrat"	1:05
4.	"Meeting the President"	0:52
5.	"The Story of a Hero"	2:40
6.	"It’s a Deadlock"	1:26
7.	"A Big Game"	1:50
8.	"The Nominee"	3:48
9.	"Show Me a Better Man"	1:17
10.	"A Sound Investment"	0:58
11.	"You Will Have No Voice"	1:35
12.	"A Flair of Hope"	2:00
13.	"Broken Promises"	0:49
14.	"Torpedo and the Whale"	1:32
15.	"History Will Remember Us"	2:25
16.	"A Question of Order"	0:35
17.	"Friends in Politics"	1:08
18.	"A President for the People"	3:13
19.	"The Letter"	1:35
20.	"Give Voice to the Common Man"	1:10
21.	"A Special Purpose"	3:50
22.	"Democracy Calls"	1:41
23.	"Stop the Vote"	1:40
24.	"I Believe in Change"	1:13
25.	"A Place in History"	2:26
26.	"A True American Hero"	1:26
27.	"Death by Lightning"	2:55
Total length:		48:44

== Release ==
Death by Lightning premiered on November 6, 2025, on Netflix.

== Reception ==
=== Critical response ===
On the review aggregator website Rotten Tomatoes, 90% of 69 critics' reviews are positive. The website's critics consensus reads: "Handsomely mounted and electrified by Matthew Macfadyen's masterclass in slimy desperation, Death by Lightning concisely dramatizes a fork in history while wistfully hinting at what could've been." On Metacritic, the series has a weighted average score of 80 out of 100, based on 31 critics, indicating "universal acclaim".

Shannon and Macfadyen's portrayals of Garfield and Guiteau were singled out for praise. (Note: Attributed to multiple references:) Richard Roeper's review at RogerEbert.com gave the series 3.5 stars out of 4, praising its boldness and writing that it "remembers Garfield as a decent man [and] Guiteau as one in a long line of broken and twisted souls."

The American Film Institute named it one of the ten best television programs of the year.

=== Accolades ===
Award	Category	Recipient(s)	Result	Ref.
American Cinema Editors Awards	Best Edited Limited Series	Joseph Krings, Anna Hauger, Michael Ruscio, and Joe Leonard (for "The Man from Ohio")	Nominated	
Art Directors Guild Awards	Excellence in Television Movie or Limited Series	Gemma Jackson	Nominated	
Critics' Choice Awards	Best Limited Series	Death by Lightning	Nominated	
Critics' Choice Awards	Best Actor in a Limited Series or a Movie Made for Television	Michael Shannon	Nominated	
Critics' Choice Awards	Best Supporting Actor in a Limited Series or a Movie Made for Television	Nick Offerman	Nominated	
Critics' Choice Awards	Best Supporting Actress in a Limited Series or a Movie Made for Television	Betty Gilpin	Nominated	
Gotham TV Awards	Outstanding Limited or Anthology Series	Mike Makowsky, David Benioff, Bernadette Caulfield, D. B. Weiss, and Matt Ross	Nominated	
Gotham TV Awards	Outstanding Lead Performance in a Limited or Anthology Series	Matthew Macfadyen	Nominated	
Gotham TV Awards	Outstanding Lead Performance in a Limited or Anthology Series	Michael Shannon	Won	
Gotham TV Awards	Outstanding Supporting Performance in a Limited or Anthology Series	Nick Offerman	Nominated	
Peabody Awards	Entertainment	Death by Lightning	Nominated	
Primetime Creative Arts Emmy Awards	Outstanding Supporting Actor in a Limited or Anthology Series or Movie	Nick Offerman	Nominated	
Primetime Creative Arts Emmy Awards	Outstanding Writing for a Limited or Anthology Series or Movie	Mike Makowsky	Nominated	
Primetime Creative Arts Emmy Awards	Outstanding Cinematography for a Limited or Anthology Series or Movie	Adriano Goldman (for "Destiny of the Republic")	Nominated	
Primetime Creative Arts Emmy Awards	Outstanding Picture Editing for a Limited or Anthology Series or Movie	Joseph Krings, Anna Hauger, Michael Ruscio, Joe Leonard, Bridget Case, and Derek Desmond (for "The Man from Ohio")	Nominated	
TCA Awards	Outstanding Achievement in Movies, Miniseries, or Specials	Death by Lightning	Won	
USC Scripter Awards	Best Adapted Screenplay – Television	Mike Makowsky (for "Destiny of the Republic")	Won	
Visual Effects Society Awards	Outstanding Supporting Visual Effects in a Photoreal Episode	Rainer Gombos, Steve Kullback, Marko Ljubez, and David Ramos (for "The Man from Ohio")	Nominated	
Writers Guild of America Awards	Best Limited Series	Mike Makowsky	Nominated	

== See also ==
- Murder of a President, 2016 episode of season 28 of the PBS documentary series American Experience, centered on Garfield and his assassination.
