= Tapirapuã =

Coordinates: 15°06′S 57°41′W

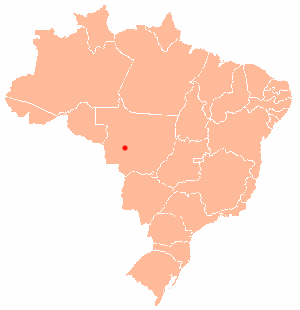
Approximate location of Tapirapuã

Tapirapuã is a village in the municipality of Barra do Bugres in Mato Grosso, Brazil. It is in the mountainous Serra do Tapirapuã region and next to Sepotuba River.

== History ==
In the early 20th century, Cândido Mariano da Silva Rondon established a warehouse for his telegraph commission in Tapirapuã which was supplied by motorized boats.

== See also ==
- Tangará da Serra
- Cândido Rondon
- Nova Olímpia
