= Tangará da Serra =

Coordinates: 14.6189°S 57.4858°W

- Municipality
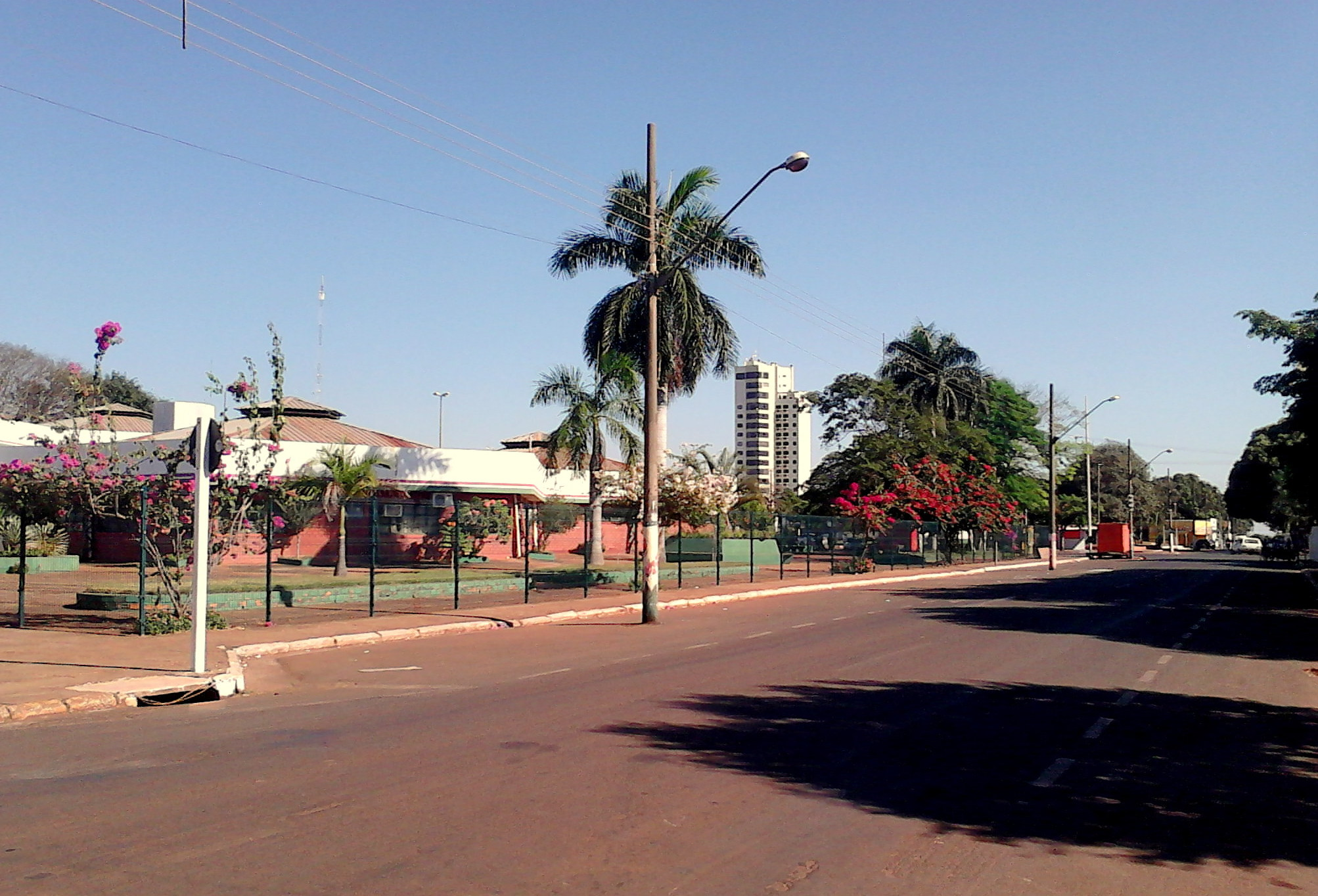

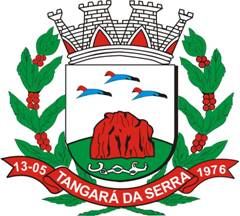
- Flag Coat of arms

- Country: Brazil
- Region: Southeast
- State: Mato Grosso
- Mesoregion: MidWest Mato-Grossense
- Elevation: 1,388 ft (423 m)

Population (2022 Census)
  - Total: 106,434
  - Estimate (2025): 114,603
- Time zone: UTC−3 (BRT)

Tangará da Serra is a municipality in the state of Mato Grosso in the Central-West Region of Brazil.

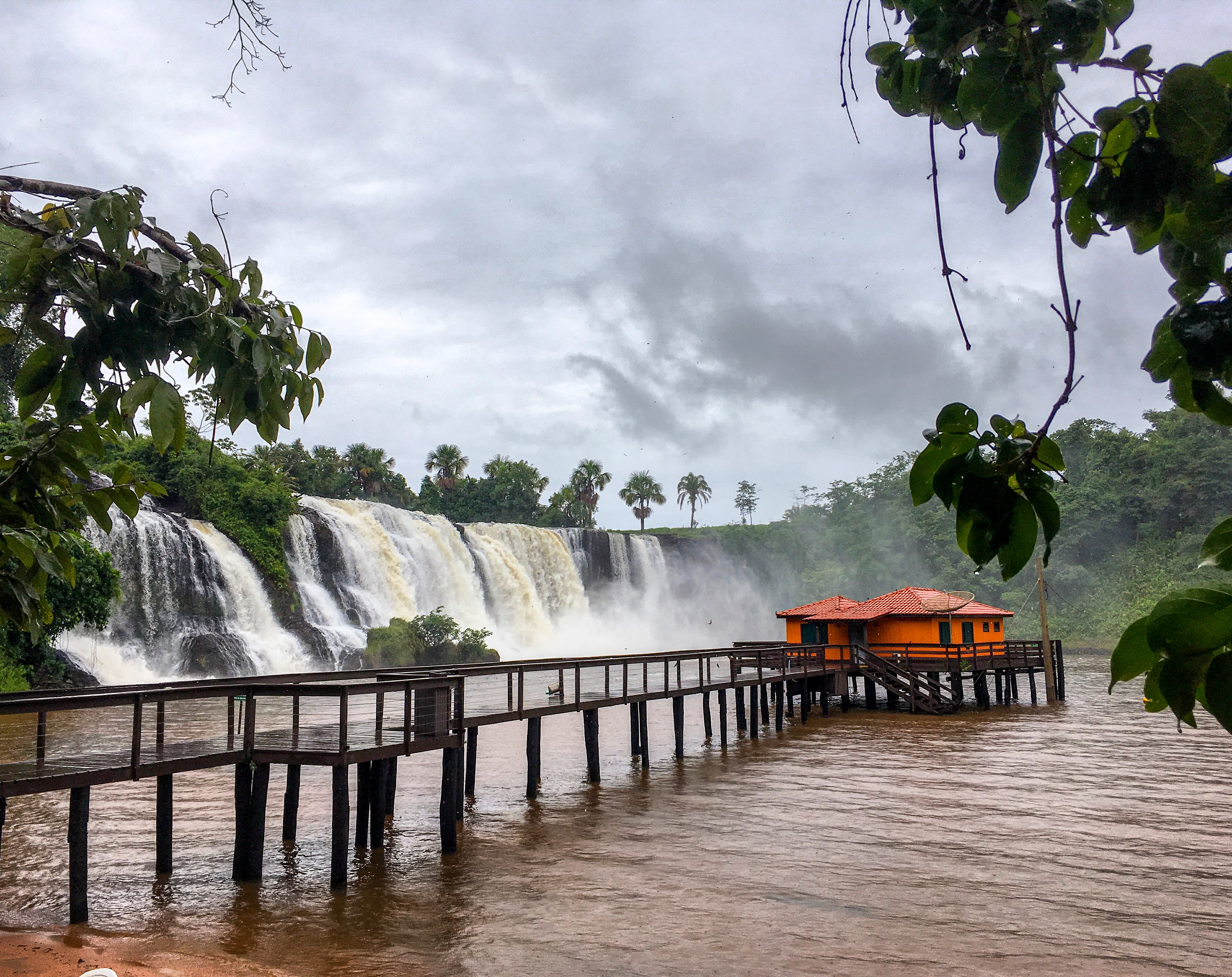
Salto das Nuvens waterfalls in Tangará da Serra, Mato Grosso

The Sepotuba River, known for its many waterfalls and rapids, is located near Tangará da Serra.

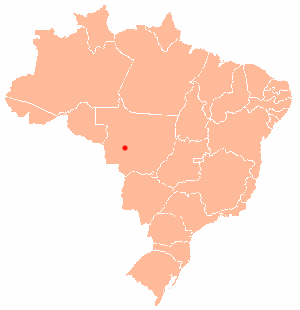
Location of Tangará da Serra

The city is served by Tangará da Serra Airport.

== See also ==
- List of municipalities in Mato Grosso
- Serra do Tapirapuã
- Nova Olímpia
- Tapirapuã
