= American Experience season 28 =

American Experience
- Season 28
- No. of episodes: 8

Release
- Original network: PBS
- Original release: January 19 – November 1, 2016

Season chronology
- ← Previous; Season 27 Next → Season 29

Season twenty-eight of the television program American Experience aired on the PBS network in the United States on January 19, 2016 and concluded on November 1, 2016. The season contained eight new episodes and began with the film Bonnie & Clyde.

== Episodes ==
No. overall	No. in season	Title	Directed by	Written by	Original release date
311	1	"Bonnie & Clyde"	John Maggio	John Maggio	January 19, 2016
A documentary about the origins, notoriety, and demise of Bonnie Parker and Clyde Barrow, members of a Depression era criminal group known as the Barrow Gang. After undeveloped film of the couple was discovered by the police and circulated by the media, the couple's crime spree and playful images captured the attention of the American public. Narrated by Michael Murphy.
312	2	"The Mine Wars"	Randall MacLowry	Teleplay by : Mark Zwonitzer; Story by : Paul Taylor	January 26, 2016
A chronicle of coal mine workers in southern West Virginia and their efforts to form a labor union during the West Virginia coal wars. The film is in part based on the book, The Devil Is Here in These Hills, by James Green. Narrated by Michael Murphy.
313	3	"Murder of a President"	Rob Rapley	Teleplay by : Rob Rapley; Story by : Paul Taylor	February 2, 2016
The film chronicles the life and death of President James A. Garfield, the fourth president to die while in office. He was shot twice by Charles J. Guiteau due to a delusional belief he could secure a patronage position from Garfield's successor Vice President Chester A. Arthur. Garfield died two months later from infected wounds and poor medical care by physician Doctor Willard Bliss. The film is based in part on the book, Destiny of the Republic: A Tale of Madness, Medicine and the Murder of a President, by Candice Millard. Narrated by Michael Murphy. Voices: Shuler Hensley (James A. Garfield), Kathryn Erbe (Lucretia Garfield), Will Janowitz (Charles J. Guiteau).
314	4	"The Perfect Crime"	Cathleen O'Connell	Michelle Ferrari	February 9, 2016
A film about Jazz Age murderers Nathan Leopold and Richard Loeb, their defense attorney Clarence Darrow, and the "trial of the century". The two 19-year-old men met while attending the University of Chicago and discovered they possessed similar backgrounds and experiences. Both young men were intelligent, of Jewish descent, and born into wealthy families that resided in the affluent Kenwood neighborhood on Chicago's South Side. Influenced by the German philosopher Friedrich Nietzsche and his concept of supermen (Übermenschen), they kidnapped and murdered 14-year-old Bobby Frank for the thrill of the kill in 1924. After mounting clues began to implicate them, the two young men confessed their entire plot to State's Attorney Robert E. Crowe. In court, the trial became a debate between Crowe and Darrow about the death penalty. Among the American public, the high-profile case became a debate about human nature. Narrated by Oliver Platt. Voice of Clarence Darrow: James Cromwell.
315	5	"Space Men"	Amanda Pollak	Amanda Pollak	March 1, 2016
A chronicle of the pre-human spaceflight research in the United States prior to the well-publicized work of NASA and the Mercury 7 during the early development of the US space program. Narrated by Michael Murphy.
316	6	"The Boys of ’36"	Margaret Grossi	Aaron R. Cohen	August 2, 2016
A documentary about the working class eight-oared varsity crew from the University of Washington that represented the United States during the 1936 Summer Olympics. They narrowly defeated crews from Italy and Germany to win the gold medal in Nazi Germany. The team's coach was Al Ulbrickson; the cocswain was Robert Moch; and the shell builder was George Yeoman Pocock. The film is based in part on the book, The Boys in the Boat: Nine Americans and Their Epic Quest for Gold at the 1936 Berlin Olympics, by Daniel James Brown. Narrated by Oliver Platt.
317	7	"Tesla"	David Grubin	David Grubin	October 18, 2016
A film about the inventions and inventiveness of Serbian-born American engineer Nikola Tesla. Narrated by Michael Murphy.
318	8	"The Battle of Chosin"	Randall MacLowry	Mark Zwonitzer	November 1, 2016
A chronicle of the Battle of Chosin Reservoir, a 17-day battle during the Korean War in 1950. Narrated by Michael Murphy.
