= Grand Cross =

Highest class in many orders

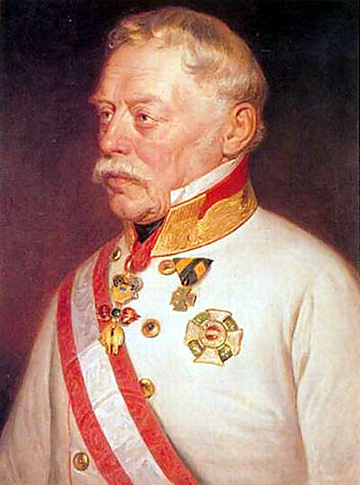
Josef Graf Radetzky wearing the Grand Cross sash and star of the Military Order of Maria Theresa

Grand Cross is the highest class in many orders, and manifested in its insignia. Exceptionally, the highest class may be referred to as Grand Cordon or equivalent. In other cases, there may exist a rank even higher than Grand Cross, e.g. Grand Collar. In rare cases, the insignia itself is referred to as the "grand cross".

On its foundation in 1802 the Legion of Honour's highest rank was not a Grand Cross but a Grand Aigle (Grand Eagle).

The Order of the Bath, modified in 1815, had three grades, the foremost of which was Knight Grand Cross. The Spanish Order of Charles III, founded in 1771 initially had two classes, Knights Grand Cross and the Knights, or caballeros pensionados ("Pensioner Knights", or simply pensionados, "pensioners").

In international relations, many times the class of Grand Cross is typically reserved for royalty, heads of state and equivalent. Sometimes a holder of the highest class or grade are referred to as "Commander Grand Cross", (Note: The designation (Swedish: Kommendör med stora korset) is used in the Swedish Orders of the Sword, Polar Star and Vasa and in the Finnish Orders of the White Rose and Lion.) "Knight Grand Cross", or just "Grand Cross".

In the Order of the Star of India and the Order of the Indian Empire the senior grade, were known as "Knights Grand Commander" (rather than the usual "Knights Grand Cross") so as not to offend the non-Christian Indians appointed to the Order.

In the United Kingdom, the rank of "Knight Grand Cross" or "Dame Grand Cross" allows the recipient to continue to use the honorific "Sir" (male) or "Dame" (female) as a style before their name. The knighthood is initially conferred, as in other countries, at the lower rank of the order, typically "Knight Commander".

In Bavaria, the royal military order established by Maximilian Joseph consisted of three classes with the Grand Crosses ranking above the Commanders and Knights. The Grand Cross title has also been used to confer military merit. For instance, the Grand Duchy of Baden awarded Prince Rupprecht a Grand Cross after World War I.

From 1870 to 1918, the German Empire also set the Grand Cross as the highest rank of the Order of the Iron Cross, followed by the first and second classes.

== Denomination "Grand Cordons" ==
The orders in which the highest rank (or second after "Collar") is named "Grand Cordons" include the following orders:

- Belgium: Grand Cordons of the Order of Leopold (highest)
- Brazil: Grand Cross of the National Order of Merit (highest national order that admits Brazilian nationals to its ranks)
- Brazil: Grand Cross of the Order of Rio Branco (special purpose)
- Brazil: Grand Cross of the National Order of Scientific Merit
- Brazil: Grand Cross of the Order of Defense Merit
- Brazil: Grand Cross of the Order of Military Merit
- Brazil: Grand Cross of the Order of Naval Merit
- Brazil: Grand Cross of the Order of Aeronautical Merit
  - Paraná: Grand Cross of the State Order of Pinheiro (highest of the state)
  - São Paulo: Grand Cross of the Order of Ipiranga (highest of the state)
- Cambodia: Grand Cross of the Royal Order of Cambodia (highest)
- Cambodia: Grand Cross of the Royal Order of Monisaraphon
- Cambodia: Grand Cross of the Royal Order of Sahametrei
- Cambodia: Grand Cross of the Royal Order of Sowathara
- Cameroon: Grand Cordon of the Order of Merit (Cameroon) (2nd)
- Cameroon: Grand Cordon of the Order of Valour (highest)
- Denmark: Grand Cross with Diamonds of the Order of the Dannebrog (2nd)
- Egypt: Grand Cordons of the Order of the Nile (highest)
- Finland: Grand Cross of the Order of the Cross of Liberty (highest)
- Finland: Grand Cross of the Order of the White Rose of Finland (2nd)
- Finland: Grand Cross of the Order of the Lion of Finland (highest)
- Finland: Grand Cross of the Order of the Holy Lamb (highest)
- France: Grand Cross of the Order of the Legion of Honour (highest)
  - French Polynesia: Grand Cross of the Order of Tahiti Nui (highest of the French overseas collectivity)
- Germany: Grand Cross of the Order of Merit of the Federal Republic of Germany
- Guinea: Grand Cross of the Kola-tree National Order (2nd)
- Guinea: Grand Cross of the National Order of Fidelity and People (highest)
- Guinea: Grand Cross of the National Order of Merit (Guinea) (highest)
- Guinea: Grand Cross of the National Order of the Campaign of Independence (highest)
- Italy: Knight Grand Cross decorated with Grand Cordon of the Order of Merit of the Italian Republic (highest)
- Japan: Grand Cordons of the Order of the Chrysanthemum (2nd after Collar)
- Japan: Grand Cordons of the Order of the Precious Crown (highest)
- Japan: Grand Cordons of the Order of the Rising Sun (highest)
- Jordan: Grand Cordons of the Order of the Star of Jordan (highest)
- Lebanon: Grand Cordons of the Order of Merit (Lebanon) (highest)
- Madagascar: Grand Cross of the National Order of Madagascar (highest)
- Netherlands: Knight Grand Cross Military William Order (highest)
- Netherlands: Knight Grand Cross Order of Orange-Nassau (3rd)
- Netherlands: Knight Grand Cross Order of the Netherlands Lion (2nd)
- Niger: Grand Cross of the National Order (Niger) (highest)
- Niger: Grand Cross of the Order of Merit (Niger) (2nd)
- Persia: Grand Cordons of the Order of the Lion and the Sun
- Poland: Grand Cross of the War Order of Virtuti Militari (highest)
- Poland: Grand Cross of the Order of Polonia Restituta (highest)
- Poland: Grand Cross of the Order of the Military Cross (highest)
- Poland: Grand Cross of the Order of Merit of the Republic of Poland (highest)
- Portugal: Grand Cross of the Order of the Tower and Sword
- Senegal: Grand Cross of the Order of Merit (Senegal) (2nd)
- Senegal: Grand Cross of the Order of the Lion (Senegal) (highest)
- Spain: Grand Cross of the Order of Charles III (2nd)
- Spain: Grand Cross of the Order of Isabella the Catholic (2nd)
- Spain: Grand Cross of the Order of Civil Merit (2nd)
- Spain: Grand Cross of the Order of Merit of the Civil Guard (highest)
- Spain: Grand Cross of the Order of Merit for Agriculture, Fisheries and Food (highest)
- Spain: Grand Cross Laureate of the Royal and Military Order of Saint Ferdinand (highest)
- Spain: Grand Cross of the Royal and Military Order of Saint Hermenegild (highest)
- Spain: Grand Cross of Military Merit (highest)
- Spain: Grand Cross of Naval Merit (highest)
- Spain: Grand Cross of Aeronautical Merit (highest)
- Spain: Grand Cross of the Royal Order of Civil Recognition to Victims of Terrorism (highest)
- Spain: Grand Cross of the Civil Order of Alfonso X, the Wise (2nd)
- Spain: Grand Cross of the Royal Order of Sports Merit (highest)
- Spain: Grand Cross of the Order of Saint Raymond of Peñafort (highest)
- Sweden Commander Grand Cross of the Order of the Sword
- Sweden Commander Grand Cross of the Order of the Polar Star
- Sweden Commander Grand Cross of the Order of Vasa
- Togo: Grand Cross of the National Order of Merit (2nd)
- Togo: Grand Cross of the Order of Mono (highest)
- Tunisia: Grand Cordon of the Order of Independence (highest)
- Tunisia: Grand Cordon of the Order of Merit (3rd)
- Tunisia: Grand Cordon of the Order of the 7th November 1987 (4th)
- Tunisia: Grand Cordon of the Order of the Republic (2nd)
- United Kingdom: Grand Cross of the Order of the Bath (highest) (Note: Also awarded in the Commonwealth Realms.)
- United Kingdom: Grand Cross of the Order of St Michael and St George (highest)
- United Kingdom: Grand Cross of the Royal Victorian Order (highest)
- United Kingdom: Grand Cross of the Order of the British Empire (highest)
- United Kingdom: Grand Cross of the Order of Saint John (highest)

=== Former ===
- Brazil: Grand Cross of the Order of Columbus (Abolished as a state order in 1891)
- Empire of Brazil: Grand Cross of the Imperial Order of Our Lord Jesus Christ (Highest, cancelled as national order in 1890, since then claimed as house order)
- Empire of Brazil: Grand Cross of the Imperial Order of Saint Benedict of Avis (2nd, cancelled as national order in 1890, since then claimed as house order)
- Empire of Brazil: Grand Cross of the Imperial Order of Saint James of the Sword (3rd, cancelled as national order in 1890, since then claimed as house order)
- Empire of Brazil: Grand Cross of the Imperial Order of the Cross (4th, cancelled as national order in 1891 and reestablished as the National Order of the Southern Cross in 1932)
- Empire of Brazil: Grand Cross of the Imperial Order of Dom Pedro I (5th, cancelled as national order in 1890, since then claimed as house order)
- Empire of Brazil: Grand Cross of the Imperial Order of the Rose (6th, cancelled as national order in 1890, since then claimed as house order)
- France
  - (France) French Comoros: Grand Cross of the Order of the Star of Anjouan (Deprecated in 1963 by the National Order of Merit)
  - (France) French Dahomey: Grand Cross of the Order of the Black Star (Deprecated in 1963 by the National Order of Merit)
  - (France) French Somaliland: Grand Cross of the Order of the Light (Deprecated in 1963 by the National Order of Merit)
- Kingdom of Hawaii: Grand Cross of the Royal Order of Kapiʻolani (3rd, became obsolete in 1893)
- Spain: Grand Cross of the Order of Cisneros (2nd)
- Spain: Grand Cross of the Imperial Order of the Yoke and Arrows (highest)
- Spain: Grand Cross of the Civil Order of Africa (highest)
- Spain: Grand Cross of the Order of Beneficence (highest)
- Spain: Grand Cross of the Civil Order of Alfonso XII (highest)
- Spain: Grand Cross of the Order of the Spanish Republic (2nd)

== Gallery ==
Illustration of typical insignia, as in the case of the Legion of Honour of France.

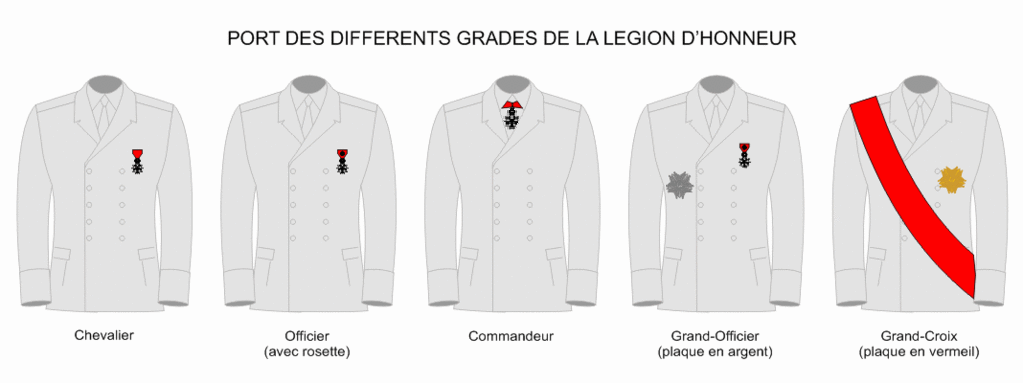

== See also ==
- Order of chivalry
- Order (distinction)
- Phaleristics
