= Hypostomus rondoni =

Scientific classification
- Domain: Eukaryota
- Kingdom: Animalia
- Phylum: Chordata
- Class: Actinopterygii
- Order: Siluriformes
- Family: Loricariidae
- Genus: Hypostomus
- Species: H. rondoni

Binomial name
- Hypostomus rondoni (A. Miranda-Ribeiro, 1912)

Synonyms
- Plecostomus rondoni

Species of fish

Hypostomus rondoni is a species of catfish in the family Loricariidae. It is native to South America, where it occurs in the Tapajós basin. The species reaches 8 cm (3.1 inches) in total length and is believed to be a facultative air-breather.

== Etymology ==
The fish is named in honor of Cândido Rondon (1865–1958), a Brazilian army engineer and explorer, whose Rondon Commission's mission was to install telegraph poles from Mato Grosso to Amazonas included an expedition that collected the type specimen.
