= The River of Doubt =

2005 book about Theodore Roosevelt

The River of Doubt: Theodore Roosevelt's Darkest Journey
- First edition cover
- Author: Candice Millard
- Genre: Biography
- Publisher: Broadway Books, Anchor Books
- Publication date: 2005
- Pages: 416
- ISBN: 978-0-7679-1373-7
- OCLC: 75284267
- LC Class: 2005046541
- Website: The River of Doubt

The River of Doubt: Theodore Roosevelt's Darkest Journey is a 2005 book by Candice Millard covering president Theodore Roosevelt's scientific expedition down the River of Doubt (later renamed the Roosevelt River), in Brazil. Millard's first book, it went on to become a Book Sense pick, winner of the William Rockhill Nelson Award, and a finalist for the Quill Awards.

== Critical reception ==
Millard's book received praise from editors of various news organizations and was listed on The New York Times Best Seller list. Bruce Barcott of the New York Times described it as, "an exhilarating story," and Tahir Shah of The Washington Post called it "a truly gripping tale."

In 2010, Kathy Hickman of The Sun Chronicle described the book, "as a bracing and inspiring start to the new year, you won't find a better tale."
