= Hero of the Empire =

2016 book about Winston Churchill's life during the Boer War

Hero of the Empire: The Boer War, a Daring Escape, and the Making of Winston Churchill
- First edition cover
- Author: Candice Millard
- Genre: Biography
- Publisher: Doubleday
- Publication date: 2016
- Pages: 381
- ISBN: 978-0-804-19489-1
- OCLC: 961698818
- Website: Hero of the Empire

Hero of the Empire: The Boer War, a Daring Escape, and the Making of Winston Churchill is a 2016 book by Candice Millard covering Winston Churchill's exploits during the Boer War. Her third book, Hero of the Empire garnered favorable response by major newspaper companies worldwide and was a winner of the 2017 Kansas Notable Book Awards.

== Critical reception ==
Millard's third book received praise from many news organizations such as The New York Times, The Washington Post, The Guardian, and USA Today.

Alex von Tunzelmann writing for The New York Times called Hero of the Empire, "a tremendously readable and enjoyable book", and Lucy Hughes-Hallett writing for The Guardian called it, "a thrilling journey, and Millard tells it with gusto."

Tim Brady of the Star Tribune described Millard as "an extremely talented writer, equally adept at penning heart-stopping battlefield scenes and the peculiarities of the emerging Boer culture in early South African history."
