= Marc A. Meyers =

American materials scientist and novelist

Marc Andre Meyers
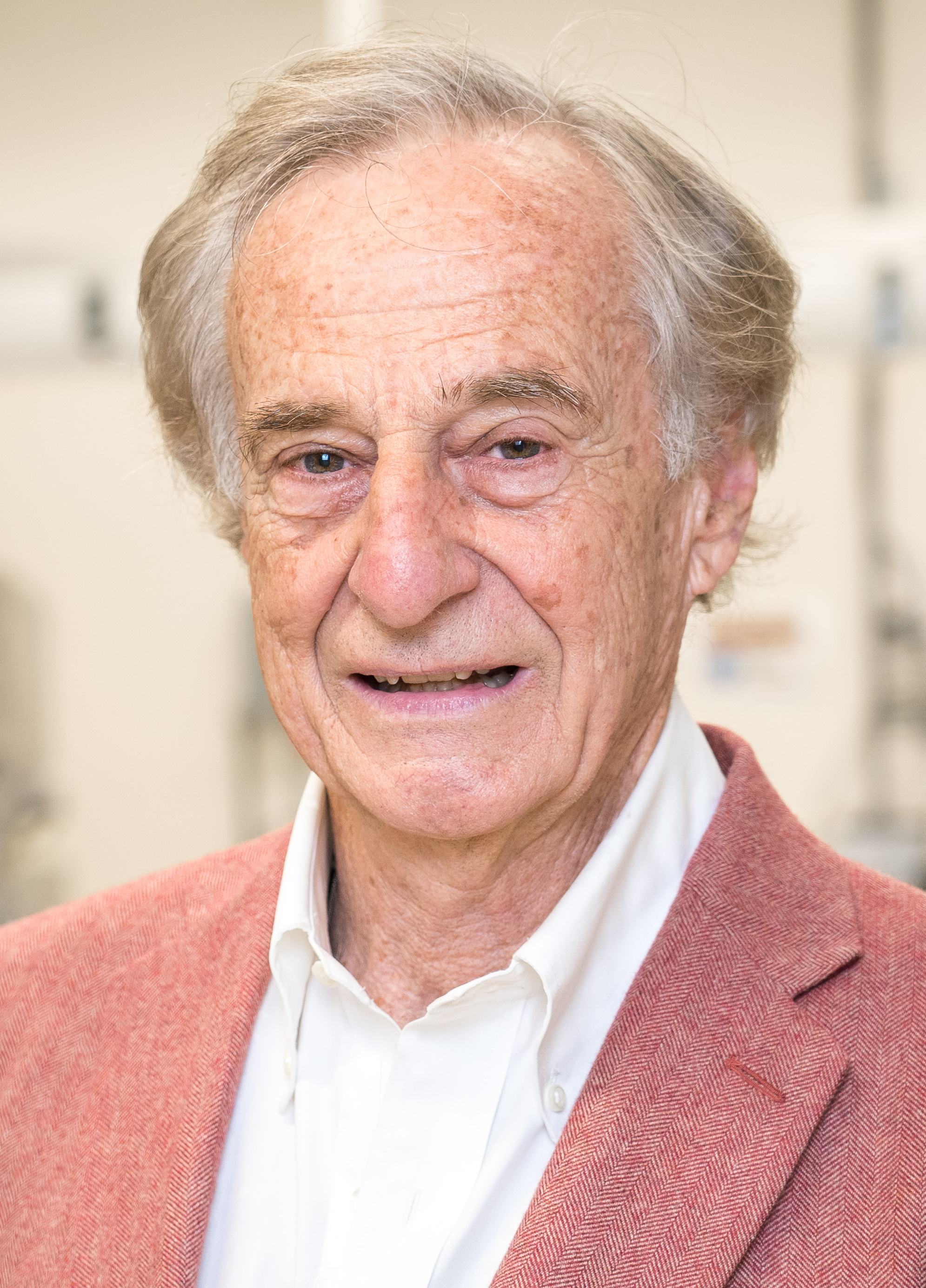
- Marc A. Meyers in 2019
- Born: August 10, 1946 (age 80); Belo Horizonte, Brazil
- Citizenship: Brazilian American
- Known for: Dynamic behavior of materials, synthesis, processing, and characterization of new materials, including nanocrystalline and ultrafine grain materials and biological materials
- Scientific career
- Fields: Materials Science, writer
- Doctoral advisor: Prof. R. N. Orava

Marc André Meyers (born August 10, 1946) is a Brazilian-American materials scientist, engineer and Distinguished Professor at the Aiiso Yufeng Li Family Department of Chemical and Nano Engineering at the University of California, San Diego. Meyers studies and writes about the dynamic behavior of materials, synthesis, processing, impact testing, and characterization of new materials. He also studies the properties of biological materials, and in particular the protective coverings of animals. Abalone shells, toucan beaks, the scales of exotic fish, feathers, piranha teeth, rabbit skin, boxfish, turtle and armadillo carapaces, and pangolin scales are some of the biological materials studied by his group.

Meyers was born in Brazil. In the summer of 2014, he organized a group to follow the Roosevelt-Rondon Scientific Expedition along the "River of Doubt".

Meyers is the recipient of many awards and recognitions and has been inducted as a Fellow of the American Society for Metals (ASM International (society)), The Minerals, Metals & Materials Society (TMS) and the American Physical Society (APS). In 2023, Meyers received the Robert Moskovic Award in recognition of an outstanding contribution to "Dynamic Behavior of Materials and Characterization of New Materials" given by the ESIS TC12 technical committee of the European Structural Integrity Society.

Meyers is also a fiction writer, and has published four novels. These books retell stories and drama from many years of working in university research departments.

== Novels ==
- A Dama E O Luxemburgues (D'Amour et d'Acier, in French translation)
- Chechnya Jihad
- Mayan Mars
- Abscission/Implosion
- Yanomami: A Novel
