= American Experience season 29 =

American Experience
- Season 29
- No. of episodes: 8

Release
- Original network: PBS
- Original release: January 10 – April 12, 2017

Season chronology
- ← Previous; Season 28 Next → Season 30

Season twenty-nine of the television program American Experience aired on the PBS network in the United States on January 10, 2017 and concluded on April 12, 2017. The season contained eight new episodes and began with the film Command and Control.

== Episodes ==
No. overall	No. in season	Title	Directed by	Written by	Original release date
319	1	"Command and Control"	Robert Kenner	Teleplay by : Robert Kenner & Eric Schlosser; Story by : Brian Pearle & Kim Roberts	January 10, 2017
The film chronicles the 1980 Damascus Titan missile explosion, part of a group of incidents known as "Broken Arrows", involving a warhead atop a LGM-25C Titan II missile near Damascus, Arkansas on September 18, 1980.
320	2	"Rachel Carson"	Michelle Ferrari	Michelle Ferrari	January 24, 2017
The film recounts the life of Rachel Carson and the impact of her 1962 book Silent Spring that warned of the dangers of pesticides. Narrated by Oliver Platt. Voice of Rachel Carson: Mary-Louise Parker.
321	3	"The Race Underground"	Michael Rossi	Michael Rossi	January 31, 2017
Narrated by Michael Murphy.
322	4	"Oklahoma City"	Barak Goodman	Barak Goodman	February 7, 2017
The film chronicles the Oklahoma City bombing that occurred on April 19, 1995. Timothy McVeigh with accomplice Terry Nichols detonated a truck bomb in front of the Alfred P. Murrah Federal Building that killed 168 people. The bombing would become the largest attack of domestic terrorism in United States history. Awards and nominations: Creative Arts Emmy Award nomination for "Exceptional Merit in Documentary Filmmaking" at the 69th Primetime Emmy Awards in 2017.
323	5	"Ruby Ridge"	Barak Goodman	Barak Goodman & Don Kleszy	February 14, 2017
324	6	"The Great War (Part 1)"	Stephen Ives	Stephen Ives	April 10, 2017
Narrated by Oliver Platt. Voices: Blythe Danner, Brandon J. Dirden, Josh Hamilton, Campbell Scott.
325	7	"The Great War (Part 2)"	Amanda Pollak	Stephen Ives	April 11, 2017
Narrated by Oliver Platt. Voices: Jacob Pitts, Courtney B. Vance.
326	8	"The Great War (Part 3)"	Rob Rapley	Rob Rapley	April 12, 2017
Narrated by Oliver Platt. Voices: Christopher Gorham, Josh Hamilton.
