= Serra do Tapirapuã =

Serra do Tapirapuã (alternatively called Serra de Tapirapuan or Serra do Tapiropoan) is a mountainous region in Mato Grosso, Brazil. It is situated between the municipalities of Tangará da Serra and Nova Olímpia, extending 307 kilometers. It is the site of the Sepotuba River and is the home of the Paresi indigenous group.

== Activities ==
Serra do Tapirapuã is known for its ecotourism.

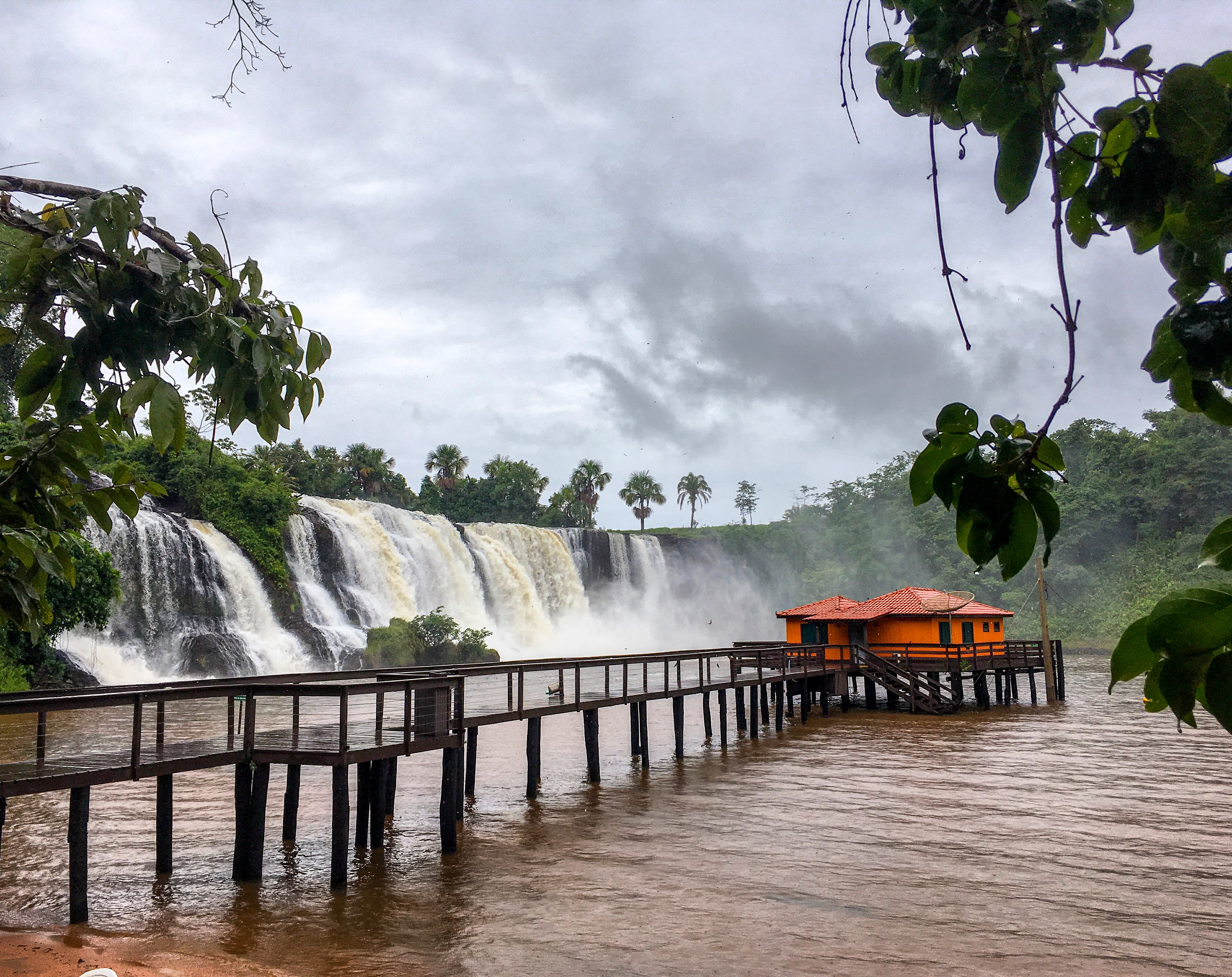
Salto das Nuvens Waterfalls in Tangará da Serra

The Mirante Camping e Lazer (Camping and Leisure Observatory) is located at the top of the region. The property was previously used for rice farming and cattle ranching and is being restored through the replanting of native vegetation.

The Sepotuba River which cuts through the region is important for ecotourism as it has many waterfalls and rapids.
