= Alfie Tempest =

English actor (born 2010)

Alfie Tempest (born August 2010) is an English child actor.

== Life ==
Tempest was born in Peterborough, Cambridgeshire and grew up near Huntingdon. Tempest attended Sawtry Village Academy.

== Career ==
Tempest made his acting debut in Guillermo del Toro's Pinocchio in 2022, voicing the son of Geppetto. He made his television debut in the 2023 Netflix mystery thriller miniseries Bodies.

In 2024, Tempest had a recurring role as Sammy Hurley in the Apple TV war drama Masters of the Air and portrayed Young Lucius in Gladiator II. The following year, he appeared in the BBC One series Miss Austen and portrayed Irvin Garfield in the Netflix miniseries Death by Lightning.

== Filmography ==
=== Film ===
Year	Title	Role	Notes
2022	Guillermo del Toro's Pinocchio	Carlo	Voice role
2024	Gladiator II	Young Lucius	

=== Television ===
Year	Title	Role	Notes
2023	Bodies	Sam	Miniseries, 2 episodes
2024	Masters of the Air	Sammy Hurley	Miniseries, 5 episodes
2025	Miss Austen	Boy	Miniseries, 2 episodes
2025	Death by Lightning	Irvin Garfield	Miniseries, 4 episodes

== Stage ==
Year	Title	Role	Theatre
2024	The Cherry Orchard	Homeless Boy	Donmar Warehouse
