= Sepotuba River =

Coordinates: 15°55′24″S 57°39′03″W

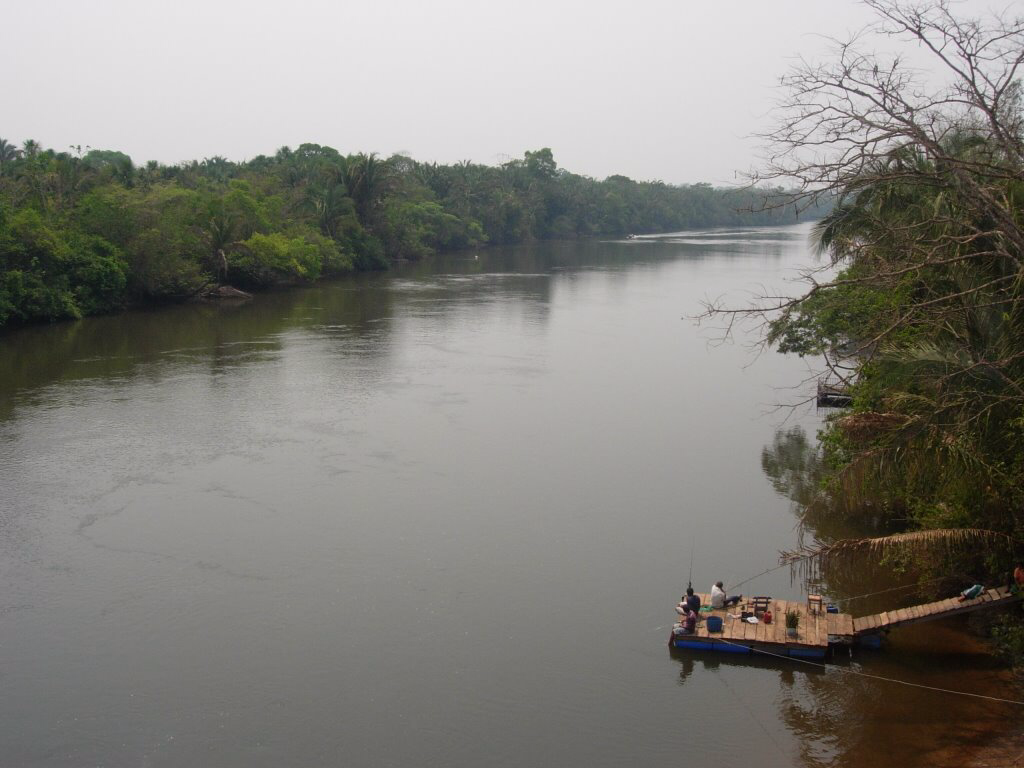

Location
- Country: Brazil
- State: Mato Grosso

Physical characteristics
- Mouth: Paraguay River
- Basin size: 984,000 hectares (9,840 km2)

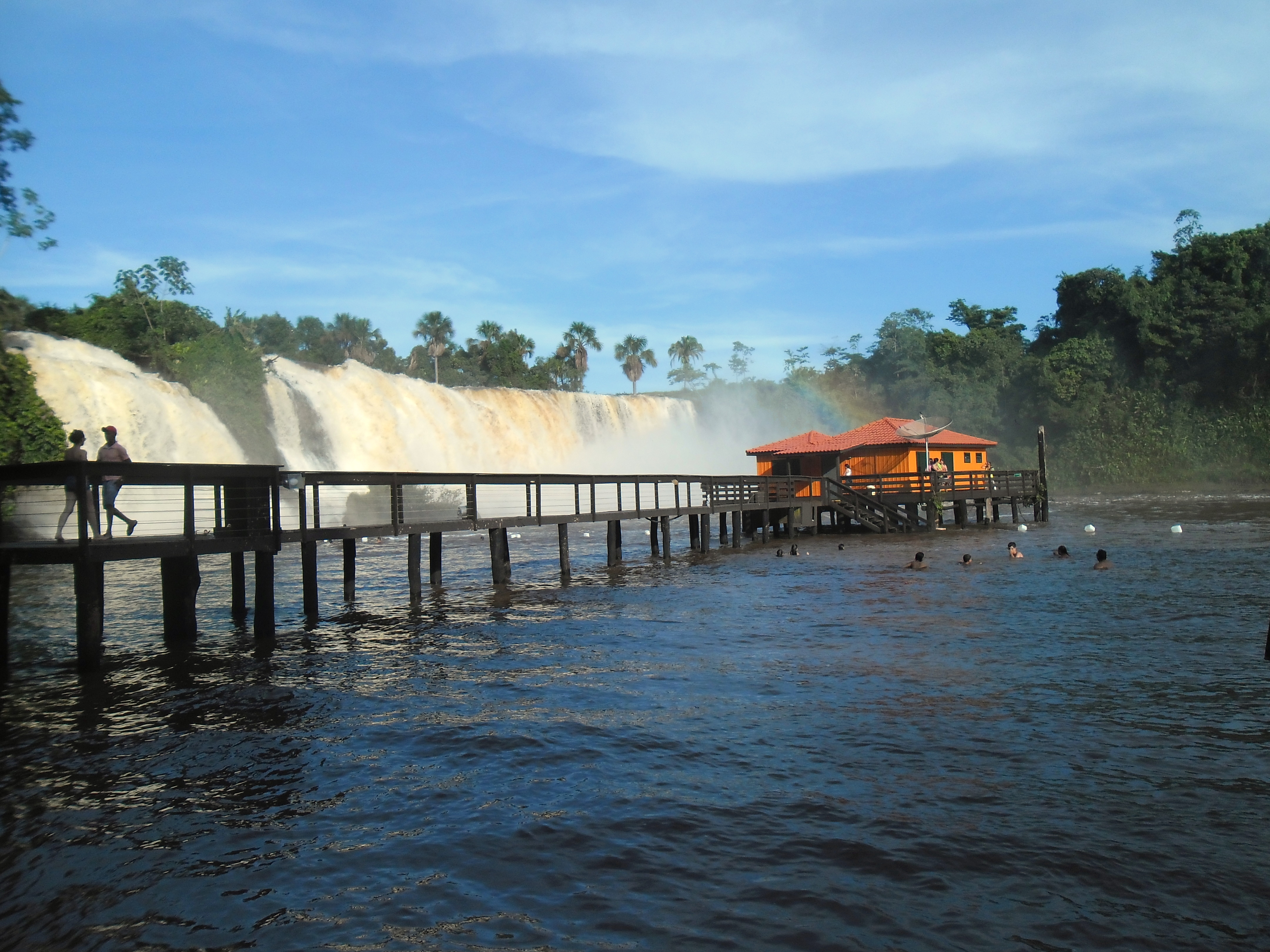
Salto das Nuvens Waterfalls on the Sepotuba River in the municipality of Tangará da Serra, Mato Grosso

The Sepotuba River is a river in the state of Mato Grosso in western Brazil. It flows through the mountainous Serra do Tapirapuã region and is a tributary of the Paraguay River.

The Sepotuba River's drainage basin is an area of over 984,000 hectares (2,430,000 acres) or 9,840 km^{2} (3,800 sq mi), representing about 1% of the total area of the state of Mato Grosso.

== Tributaries ==
The Sepotuba River cuts through the Serra do Tapirapuã, a basaltic plateau with an average altitude of about 450 meters, until it reaches the lower altitudes of the Paraguay River. Its main tributaries are the Formoso and Juba rivers, but its tributaries also include smaller rivers:

- Rio Sepotubinha
- Rio das Tocas
- Rio Queima-Pé
- Rio Sapo
- Rio Jubinha

Its streams include:

- Ararão
- Estaca
- Tarumã
- Água Limpa
- Bezerro Vermelho

== Tourism ==
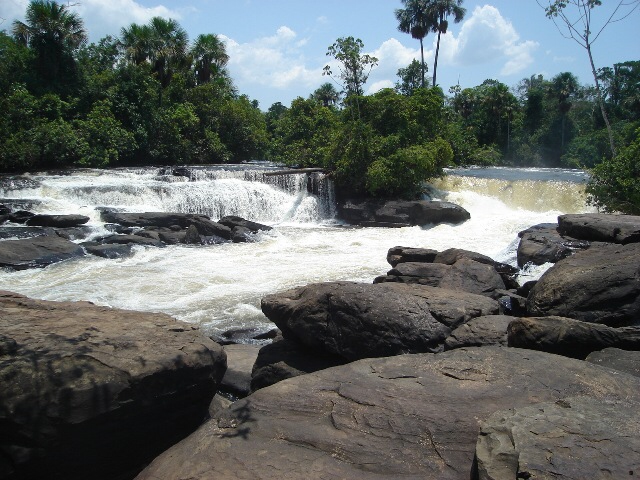
Salto Maciel Waterfalls

When flowing through the Serra Tapirapuã, the Sepotuba River creates many waterfalls and cachoeiras and rapids. Some of the most well known places are the Salto das Nuvens Waterfalls, with a height of 19 meters and a width of 100 meters, and the Salto Maciel Waterfalls, which forms a sequence of rapids.

== See also ==
- List of rivers of Mato Grosso
- Tangará da Serra
- Cândido Rondon
