= Barra do Bugres =

Barra do Bugres, Mato Grosso
- Municipality
- Flag Coat of arms

- Location of Barra do Bugres, Mato Grosso

- Location in Brazil
- Coordinates: 15°04′22″S 57°10′51″W
- Country: Brazil
- Region: Central-West
- State: Mato Grosso
- Founded: December 31, 1943

Government
  - Mayor: Divino Henrique Rodrigues dos Santos

Area
  - Total: 7,228.902 km^{2} (2,791.095 sq mi)

Population (2020)
  - Total: 35,307
  - Density: 4.8841/km^{2} (12.650/sq mi)
- Demonym: barrense
- Time zone: UTC−3 (BRT)
- Postal code: 78390-000
- Website: https://www.barradobugres.mt.gov.br/

Barra do Bugres is a municipality in the state of Mato Grosso in the Central-West Region of Brazil.

== See also ==
- List of municipalities in Mato Grosso
- Tapirapuã, a district of Barra do Bugres
