= Tangará da Serra Airport =

Tangará da Serra Airport Airport Aeroporto de Tangará da Serra
- IATA: TGQ; ICAO: SWTS; LID: MT0012

Summary
- Airport type: Public
- Serves: Tangará da Serra
- Time zone: BRT−1 (UTC−04:00)
- Elevation AMSL: 449 m (1,473 ft)
- Coordinates: 14°39′43″S 57°26′38″W

Map
- Location in Brazil

Runways
Direction	Length		Surface
Direction	m	ft	Surface
18/36	1,500	4,921	Asphalt
- Sources: ANAC, DECEA

Tangará da Serra Airport (IATA: TGQ, ICAO: SWTS), is the airport serving Tangará da Serra, Brazil.

== Access ==
The airport is located 13 km (8 mi) from downtown Tangará da Serra.

== See also ==
- List of airports in Brazil
