= Destiny of the Republic =

Book by Candice Millard

Destiny of the Republic: A Tale of Madness, Medicine and the Murder of a President
- Author: Candice Millard
- Published: 2011
- Publisher: Doubleday
- Pages: 339
- Awards: Edgar Award for Best Fact Crime (2012)
- ISBN: 978-0-385-52626-5
- Website: Destiny of the Republic

Destiny of the Republic: A Tale of Madness, Medicine and the Murder of a President is a 2011 nonfiction book by Candice Millard covering the life and assassination of James A. Garfield, the 20th President of the United States, as well as his assassin, Charles J. Guiteau. Published by Doubleday (an imprint of Knopf Doubleday Publishing Group, owned by Random House) on 20 September 2011, it won the Edgar Award for Best Fact Crime in 2012.

== Critical reception ==
Millard's book received positive reviews upon publishing by organizations such as The New York Times, The Washington Times, and The Seattle Times.

Del Quentin Wilber of The Washington Post said of the book, "Millard has crafted a fresh narrative that plumbs some of the most dramatic days in U.S. presidential history."

=== Awards ===
The book went on to win the following awards:

- Edgar Award for Best Fact Crime (2012)
- Andrew Carnegie Medal Nominee for Nonfiction (2012)
- PEN Center USA award for Research Nonfiction
- One Book – One Lincoln Award

== Adaptations ==
The book was partially the inspiration for the American Experience episode “Murder of a President”, narrated by Michael Murphy, featuring Shuler Hensley as Garfield, Kathryn Erbe as Lucretia Garfield and Will Janowitz as Guiteau.

The book was adapted into the 2025 Netflix miniseries Death by Lightning starring Michael Shannon as Garfield, Betty Gilpin as Lucretia Garfield, Nick Offerman as Vice President Chester A. Arthur, and Matthew Macfadyen as Guiteau.
