= Rondon's tuco-tuco =

Scientific classification
- Domain: Eukaryota
- Kingdom: Animalia
- Phylum: Chordata
- Class: Mammalia
- Order: Rodentia
- Family: Ctenomyidae
- Genus: Ctenomys
- Species: C. rondoni

Binomial name
- Ctenomys rondoni Miranda-Ribeiro, 1914

Species of rodent

Rondon's Tuco-tuco, Ctenomys rondoni, is a tuco-tuco species from South America. It is found in Mato Grosso, Brazil.
