= Candice Millard =

American journalist

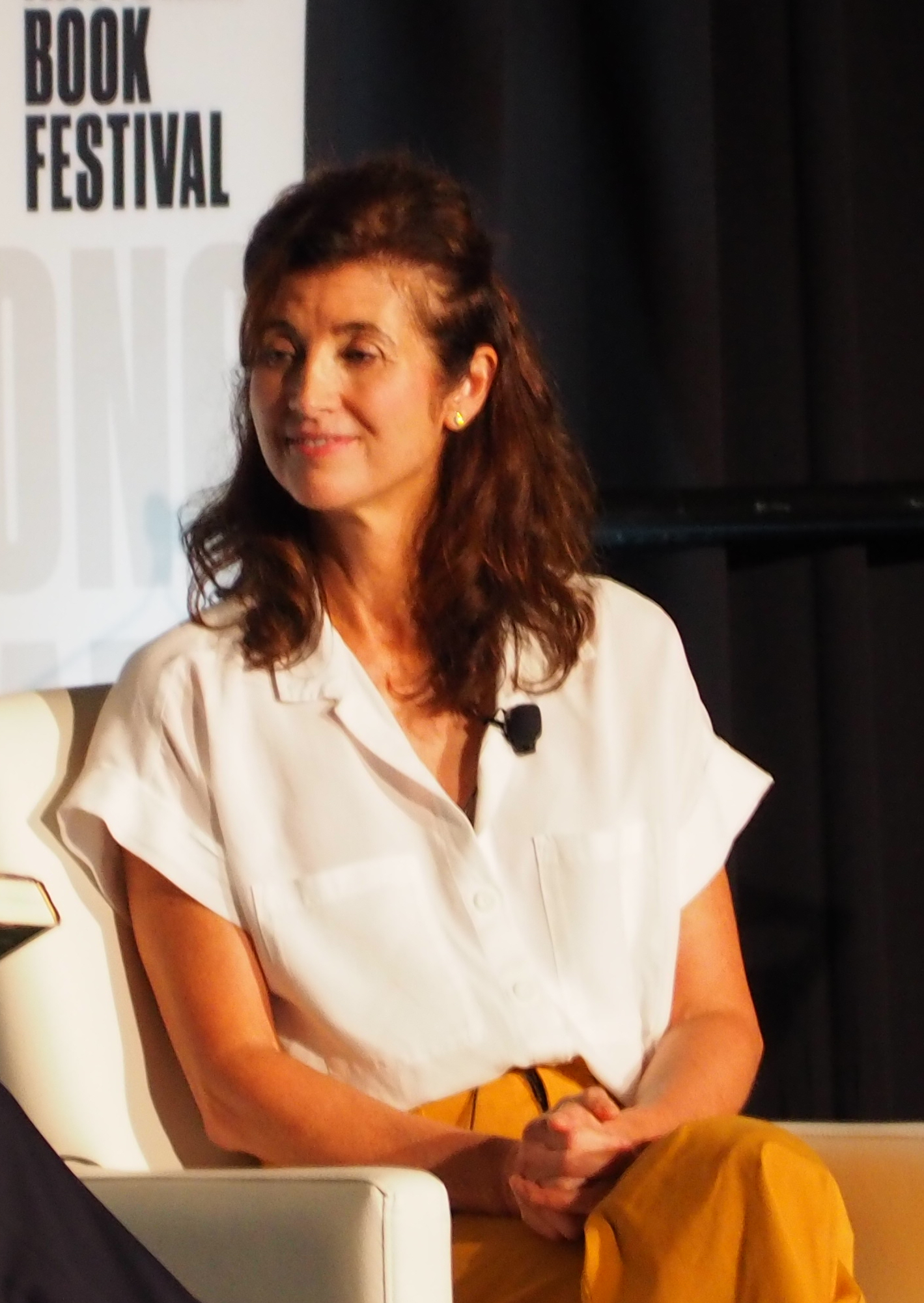
- Born: Candice Sue Millard; June 16, 1967 (age 59)
- Education: Baker University (BA); Baylor University (MA)
- Occupation: Author
- Spouse: Mark Uhlig
- Children: 3
- Writing career
- Language: English
- Subject: American history

Candice Sue Millard (born 1967) is an American writer and journalist. She is a former writer and editor for National Geographic and the author of four books: The River of Doubt, a history of the Roosevelt–Rondon Scientific Expedition of the Amazon rainforest in 1913–14; Destiny of the Republic, about the life and assassination of United States President James A. Garfield; Hero of the Empire, about Winston Churchill's activities during the Boer War; and River of the Gods, about the search for the source of the Nile River.

== Personal life and education ==
Millard grew up in Lexington, Ohio. She is a graduate of Baker University and earned a master's degree in literature from Baylor University.

Millard married Mark Uhlig in May 2001. She has a corner office at his publishing company in Overland Park, Kansas, where she works while their three children are in school. They live in Leawood, Kansas.

== Awards ==
Both The River of Doubt (2005), and Destiny of the Republic (2011) were New York Times Best Sellers. River of Doubt was a Quill Awards finalist.

In April 2012, Millard won the Edgar Award for Best Fact Crime Book for Destiny of the Republic. The book also received a PEN Center USA Award and the 34th Thorpe Menn Award for Literary Excellence from the American Association of University Women, Kansas City Branch, in 2012.

Subsequently, Millard won the 2017 BIO Award from the Biographers International Organization for her biographies of Churchill, Garfield, and Roosevelt.

== Bibliography ==
- Keepers of the Faith: The Living Legacy of Aksum National Geographic (July 2001)
- The River of Doubt: Theodore Roosevelt's Darkest Journey (2005) ISBN 978-0-7679-1373-7
- Destiny of the Republic: A Tale of Madness, Medicine and the Murder of a President (2011) ISBN 978-0-385-52626-5
- Hero of the Empire: The Boer War, a Daring Escape, and the Making of Winston Churchill (2016) ISBN 978-0-804-19489-1
- River of the Gods: Genius, Courage, and Betrayal in the Search for the Source of the Nile (2022) ISBN 978-0-385-54310-1
