= Order of Columbus =

Order of Columbus Ordem do Colombo
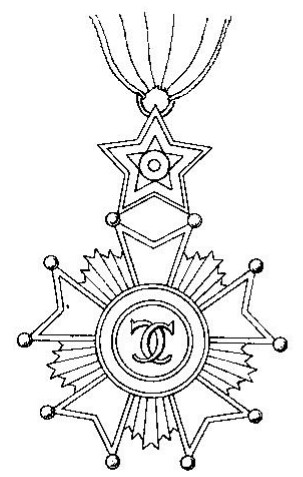

Awarded by the Government of Brazil
- Type: National order
- Status: Abolished as a state order in 1891
- Grades: Grand Cross (Grã-cruz); Grand Officer (Dignitário); Officer (Oficial); Knight (Cavaleiro)
- Ribbon bar

The Order of Columbus (Brazilian Portuguese: Ordem de Colombo) was a short-lived Brazilian order of merit. It was instituted on 6 June 1890, just two months after the abolition of all Imperial Brazilian Orders.

The first constitution of the Brazilian republic abolished the order of Columbus on 24 February 1891.

The Order consisted of:

- a Grandmaster,
- twelve real and twenty-four honorary grand-crosses,
- fifty dignitaries (Grand-officers),
- one-hundred and fifty officers, and an unlimited number of knights.
