= Nova Olímpia, Mato Grosso =

Coordinates: 14°47′49″S 57°17′16″W

Nova Olímpia
- Municipality
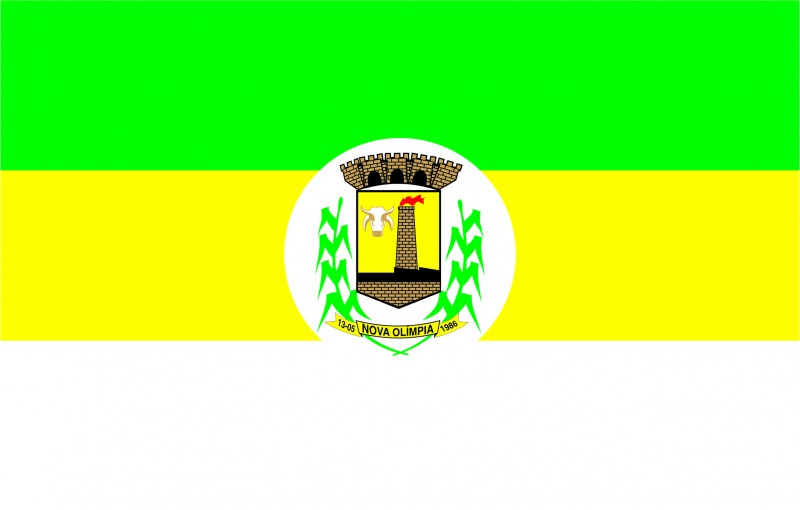
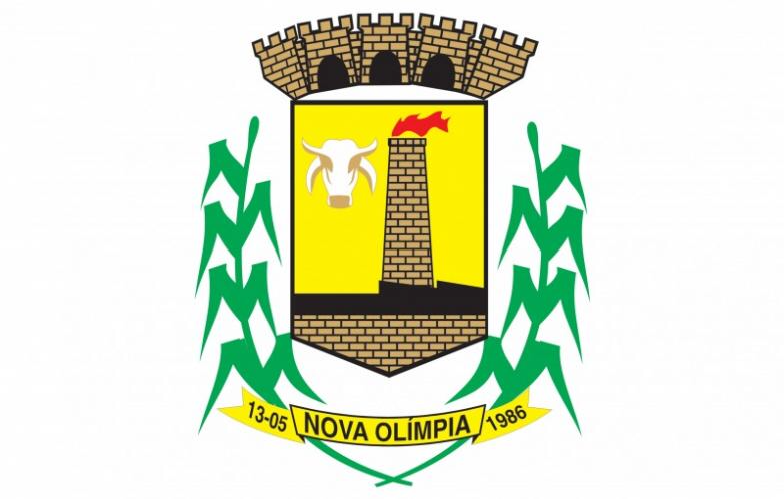
- Flag Coat of arms

- Country: Brazil
- Region: Southeast
- State: Mato Grosso
- Mesoregion: Sudoeste Mato-Grossense

Population (2020)
  - Total: 20,563
- Time zone: UTC−3 (BRT)

Nova Olímpia is a municipality in the state of Mato Grosso in the Central-West Region of Brazil.

== See also ==
- List of municipalities in Mato Grosso
