= Nudity =

State of humans wearing no clothing

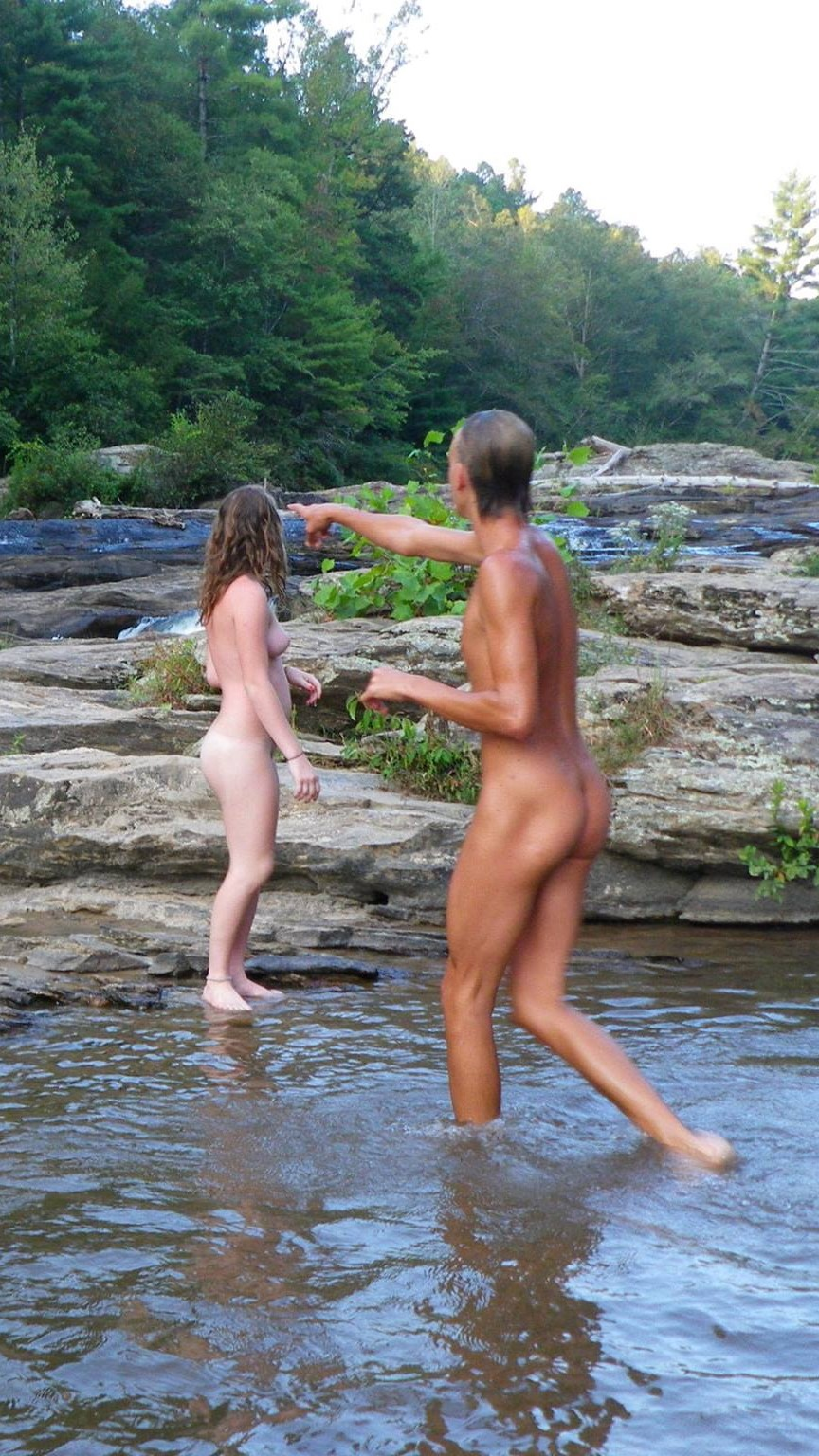
Florida naturists in a river, 2014

Nudity is the state of being in which a human is without clothing. While estimates vary, for the first 90,000 years of pre-history, anatomically modern humans were naked, having lost their body hair, living in hospitable climates, and not having developed the crafts needed to make clothing. As humans became behaviorally modern, body adornments such as jewelry, tattoos, body paint and scarification became part of non-verbal communications, indicating a person's social and individual characteristics. Indigenous peoples in warm climates used clothing for decorative, symbolic or ceremonial purposes but were often nude, having neither the need to protect the body from the elements nor any conception of nakedness being shameful. In many ancient as well as modern societies, children might be naked until the beginning of puberty, and women often do not cover their breasts, which are locally associated more with nursing than with sexuality.

In the ancient civilizations of the Mediterranean, from Mesopotamia to the Roman Empire, proper attire was required to maintain social standing. The majority might possess a single piece of cloth that was wrapped or tied to cover the lower body; slaves might be naked. However, through much of Western history until the modern era, people of any status were also unclothed by necessity or convenience when engaged in labor and athletics; or when bathing or swimming. Such functional nudity occurred in groups that were usually, but not always, segregated by sex. Although improper dress might be socially embarrassing, the association of nudity with sin regarding sexuality began with Abrahamic beliefs, spreading through Europe in the post-classical period. Traditional clothing in temperate regions worldwide also reflect concerns for maintaining social status and order, as well as by necessity due to the colder climate. However, societies such as Japan and Finland maintain traditions of communal nudity based upon the use of baths and saunas that provided alternatives to sexualization.

The spread of Western concepts of modest dress was part of colonialism, and continues today with globalization. Contemporary social norms regarding nudity reflect cultural ambiguity towards the body and sexuality, and differing conceptions of what constitutes public versus private spaces. Norms relating to nudity are different for men than they are for women. Individuals may intentionally violate norms relating to nudity; those without power may use nudity as a form of protest, and those with power may impose nakedness on others as a form of punishment.

While the majority of contemporary societies require clothing in public, some recognize non-sexual nudity as being appropriate for some recreational, social or celebratory activities, and appreciate nudity in the arts as representing positive values. A minority within many countries assert the benefits of social nudity, while other groups continue to disapprove of nudity not only in public but also in private based upon religious beliefs. Norms are codified to varying degrees by laws defining proper dress and indecent exposure.

== Terminology ==
In general English usage, nude and naked are often synonyms for a human being unclothed, but take on many meanings in particular contexts. Nude derives from Norman French, while naked is from the Anglo-Saxon. To be naked is more straightforward, not being properly dressed, or if stark naked, entirely without clothes. Nudity has more cultural connotations, and particularly in the fine arts, positive associations with the beauty of the human body.

Further synonyms and euphemisms for nudity abound, including "birthday suit", "in the altogether" and "in the buff". Partial nudity may be defined as not covering the genitals or other parts of the body deemed sexual, such as the buttocks or female breasts.

== Origins of nakedness and clothing ==
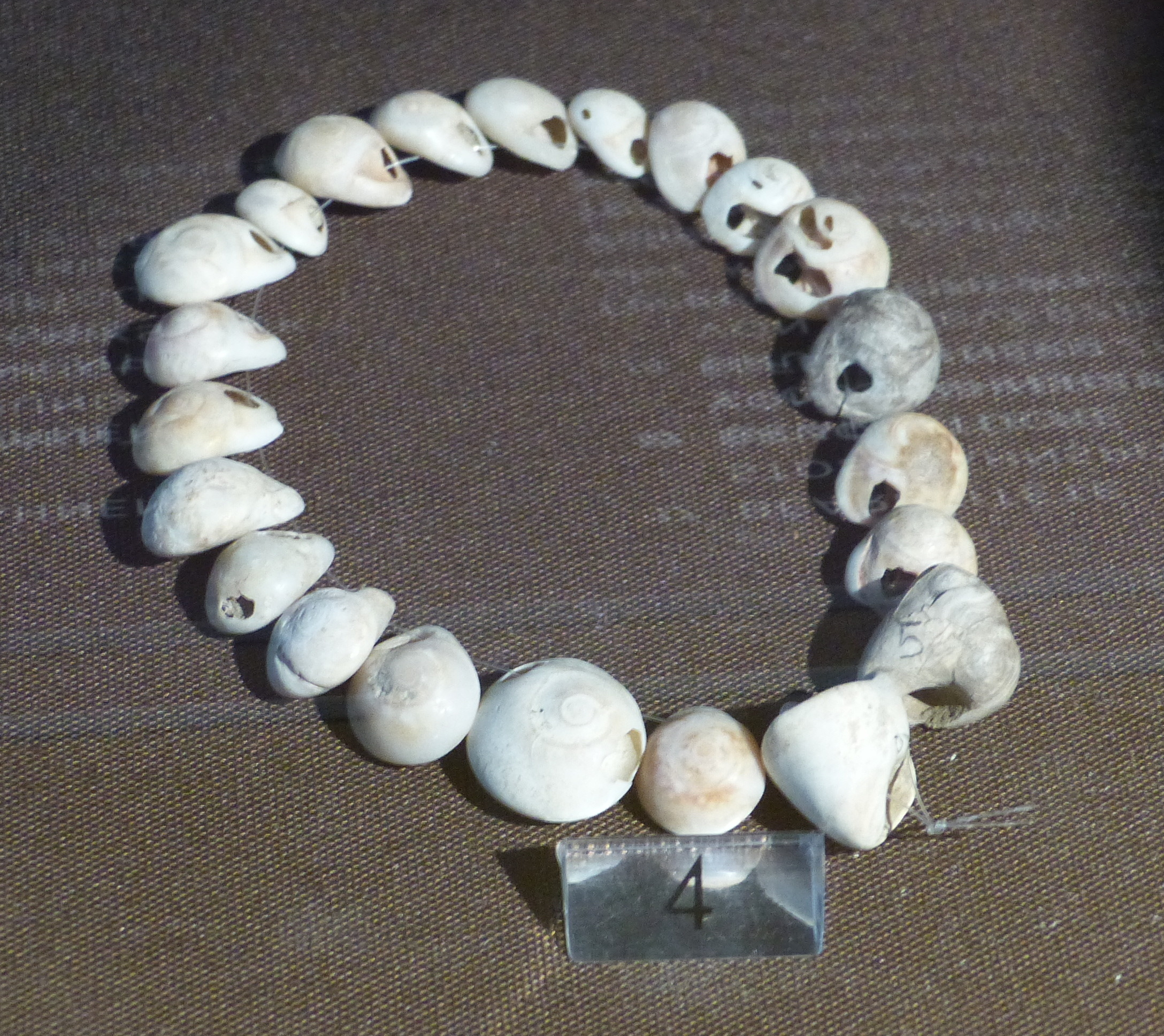
A necklace reconstructed from perforated sea snail shells from Upper Palaeolithic Europe, dated between 39,000 and 25,000 BCE. The practice of body adornment is associated with the emergence of behavioral modernity.

Two human evolutionary processes are significant regarding nudity; first the biological evolution of early hominids from being covered in fur to being effectively hairless, followed by the sociocultural evolution of adornments and clothing. In the past there have been several theories regarding why humans lost their fur, but the need to dissipate body heat remains the most widely accepted evolutionary explanation. Less hair, and an increase in eccrine sweating, made it easier for early humans to cool their bodies when they moved from living in shady forest to open savanna. The ability to dissipate excess body heat was one of the things that made possible the dramatic enlargement of the brain, the most temperature-sensitive human organ.

Some of the technology for what is now called clothing may have originated to make other types of adornment, including jewelry, body paint, tattoos, and other body modifications, "dressing" the naked body without concealing it. According to Mark Leary and Nicole Buttermore, body adornment is one of the changes that occurred in the late Paleolithic (40,000 to 60,000 years ago) in which humans became not only anatomically modern, but also behaviorally modern and capable of self-reflection and symbolic interaction. More recent studies place the use of adornment at 77,000 years ago in South Africa, and 90,000—100,000 years ago in Israel and Algeria. While modesty is a factor, often overlooked purposes for body coverings are camouflage used by hunters, body armor, and costumes used to impersonate "spirit-beings".

The current empirical evidence for the origin of clothing is from a 2010 study published in Molecular Biology and Evolution. That study indicates that the habitual wearing of clothing began at some point in time between 170,000 and 83,000 years ago based upon a genetic analysis indicating when clothing lice diverged from their head louse ancestors. A 2017 study published in Science estimated that anatomically modern humans evolved 350,000 to 260,000 years ago. Thus, humans were naked in prehistory for at least 90,000 years.

Functional nudity in ancient history
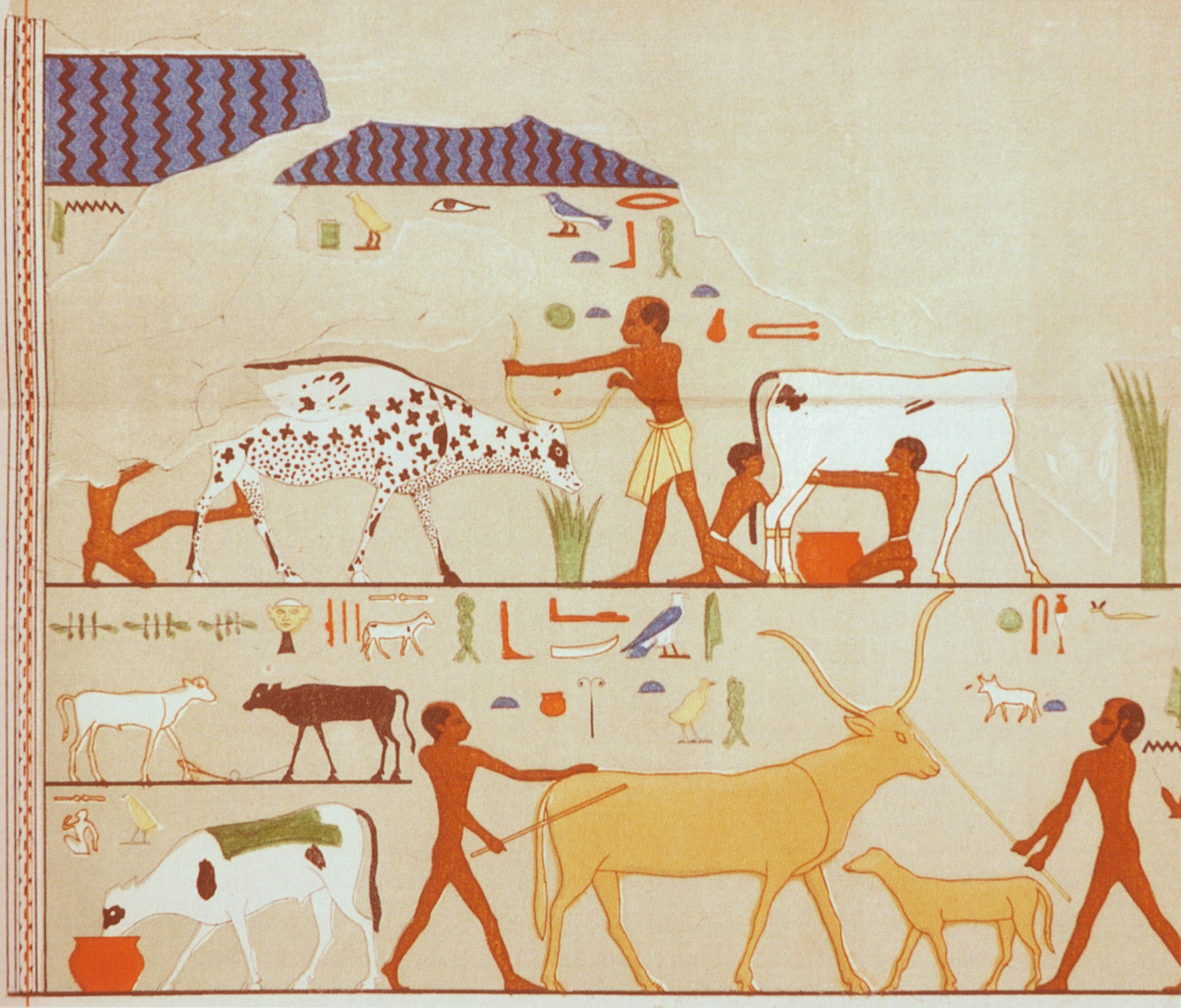
Scenes of herders, Fifth Dynasty (c. 2500–2300 BCE), Abusir necropolis, Egypt

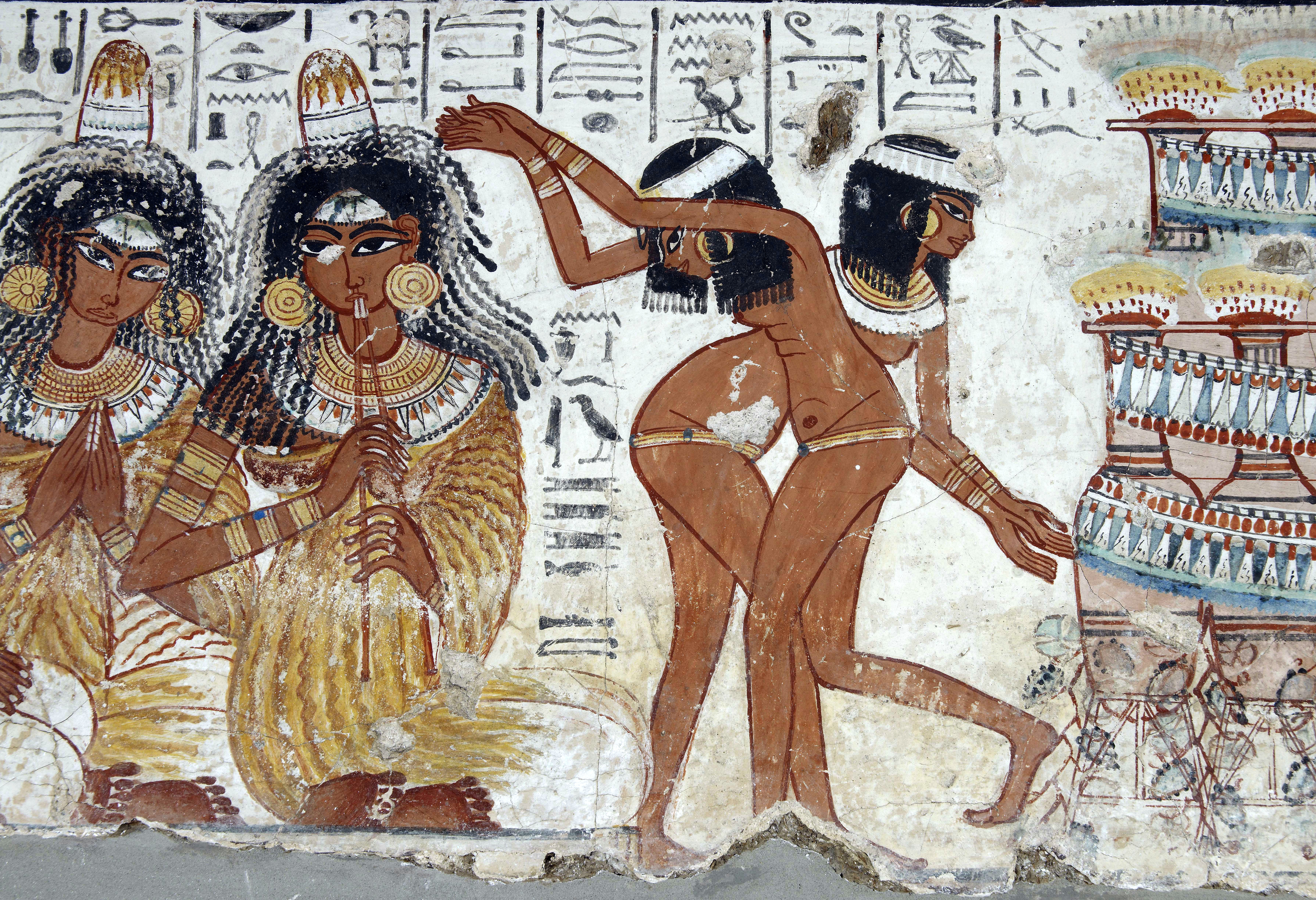
Women dancers performed wearing only jewelry in Ancient Egypt – Thebes tomb c. 1400 BCE.

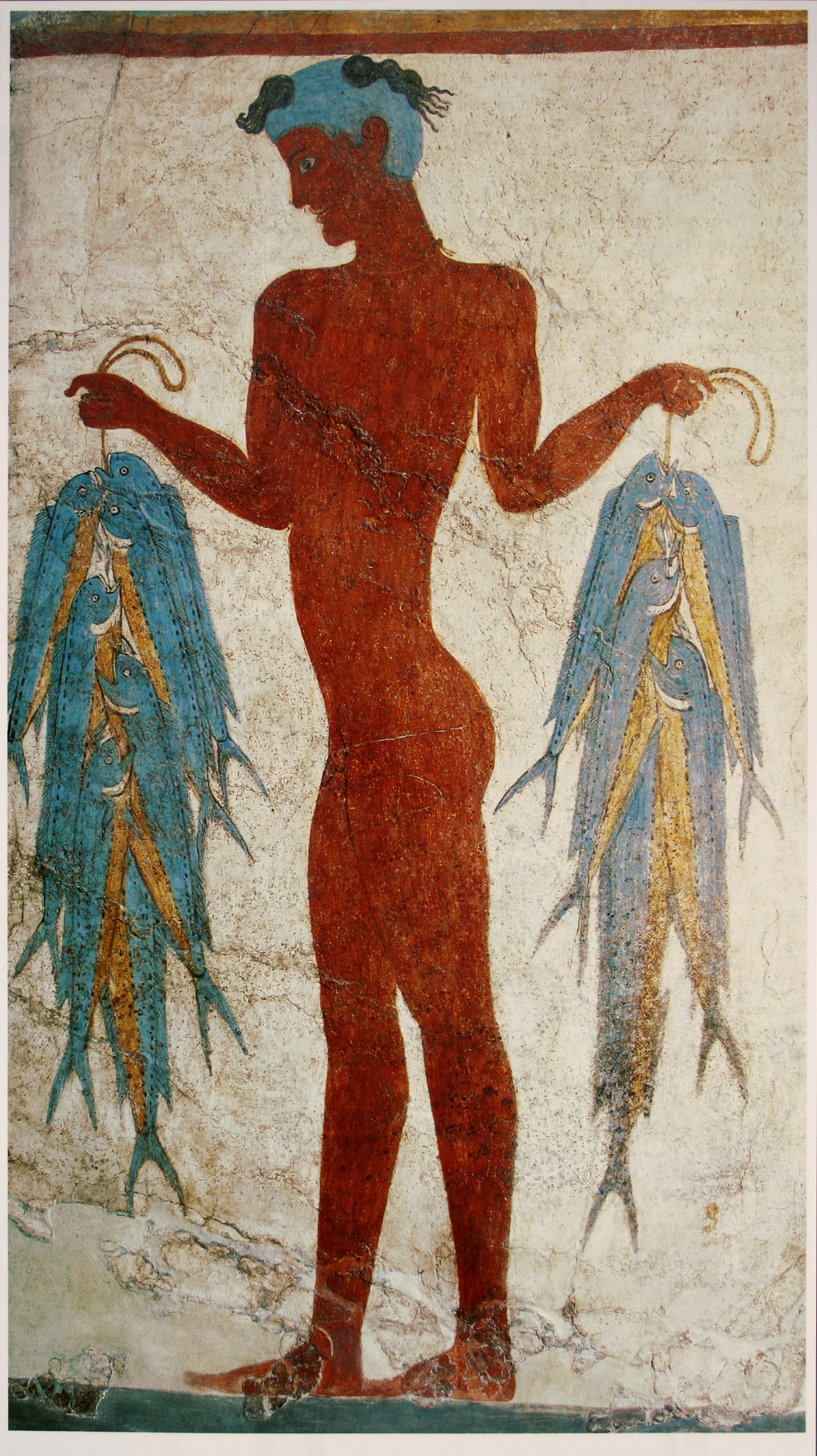
Fresco of a fisherman, Akrotiri, Santorini, Greece 1600–1500 BCE

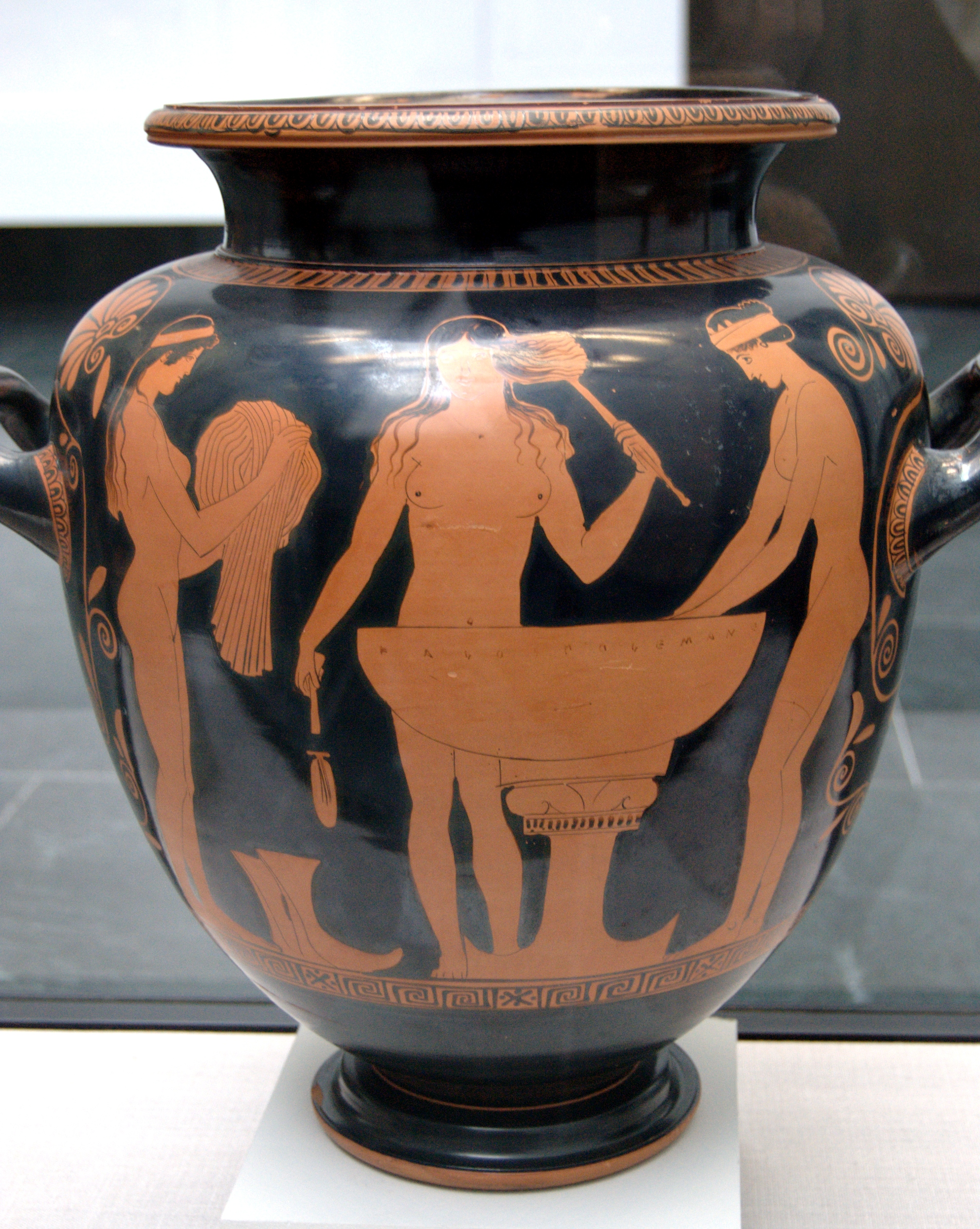
Three young women bathing. Side B from an Attic red-figure stamnos, 440–430 BCE.

== History of nudity ==
The habitual use of clothing is one of the changes that mark the end of the Neolithic and the beginning of civilization, between 7,000 and 9,000 years ago. Much of what is known about the early history of clothing is from depictions of the higher classes, there being few surviving artifacts. Everyday behaviors are rarely represented in historical records. Clothing and adornment became part of the symbolic communication that marked a person's membership in their society, thus nakedness meant being at the bottom of the social scale, lacking in dignity and status. In each culture, ornamentation represented the wearer's place in society; position of authority, economic class, gender role, and marital status. From the beginning of civilization, there was ambiguity regarding everyday nakedness and the nudity in depictions of deities and heroes indicating positive meanings of the unclothed body. Among ancient civilizations only Abrahamic societies associated nakedness primarily with sin or shame regarding sexuality.

=== Ancient and classical history ===
For millennia from Mesopotamia to the Middle Kingdom of Egypt the majority of men and women wore a cloth wrapped or tied to cover the lower part of the body. Both men and women would be bare-chested and barefoot. Complete nakedness was embarrassing due to the social connotations of low status and deprivation rather than shame regarding sexuality. Slaves might not be provided with clothing. Other workers would be naked while performing many tasks, particularly if hot, dirty, or wet; farmers, fishermen, herders, and those working close to fires or ovens. Only the upper classes were habitually dressed. It was not until the later periods, in particular the New Kingdom of Egypt (1550–1069 BCE), that functionaries in the households of the wealthy began wearing refined dress, and upper-class women wore elaborate dresses and ornamentation which covered their breasts. These later styles are often shown in film and television as representing Ancient Egypt in all periods.

Nude deities
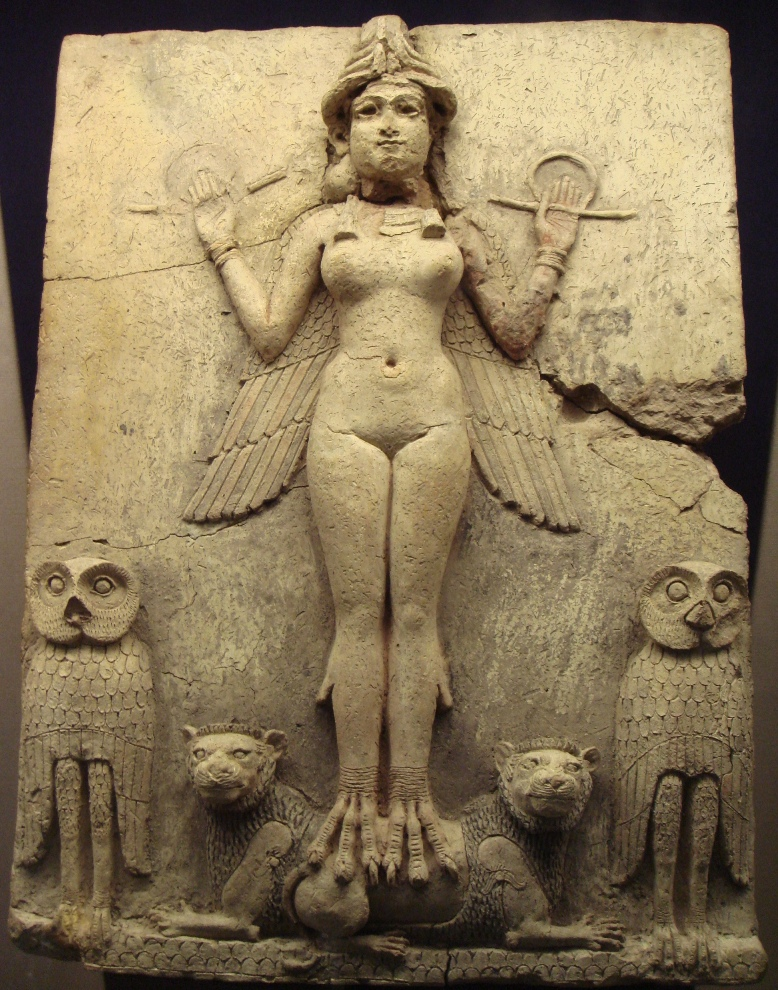
The Burney Relief, First Babylonian Dynasty (c. 1800 BCE)

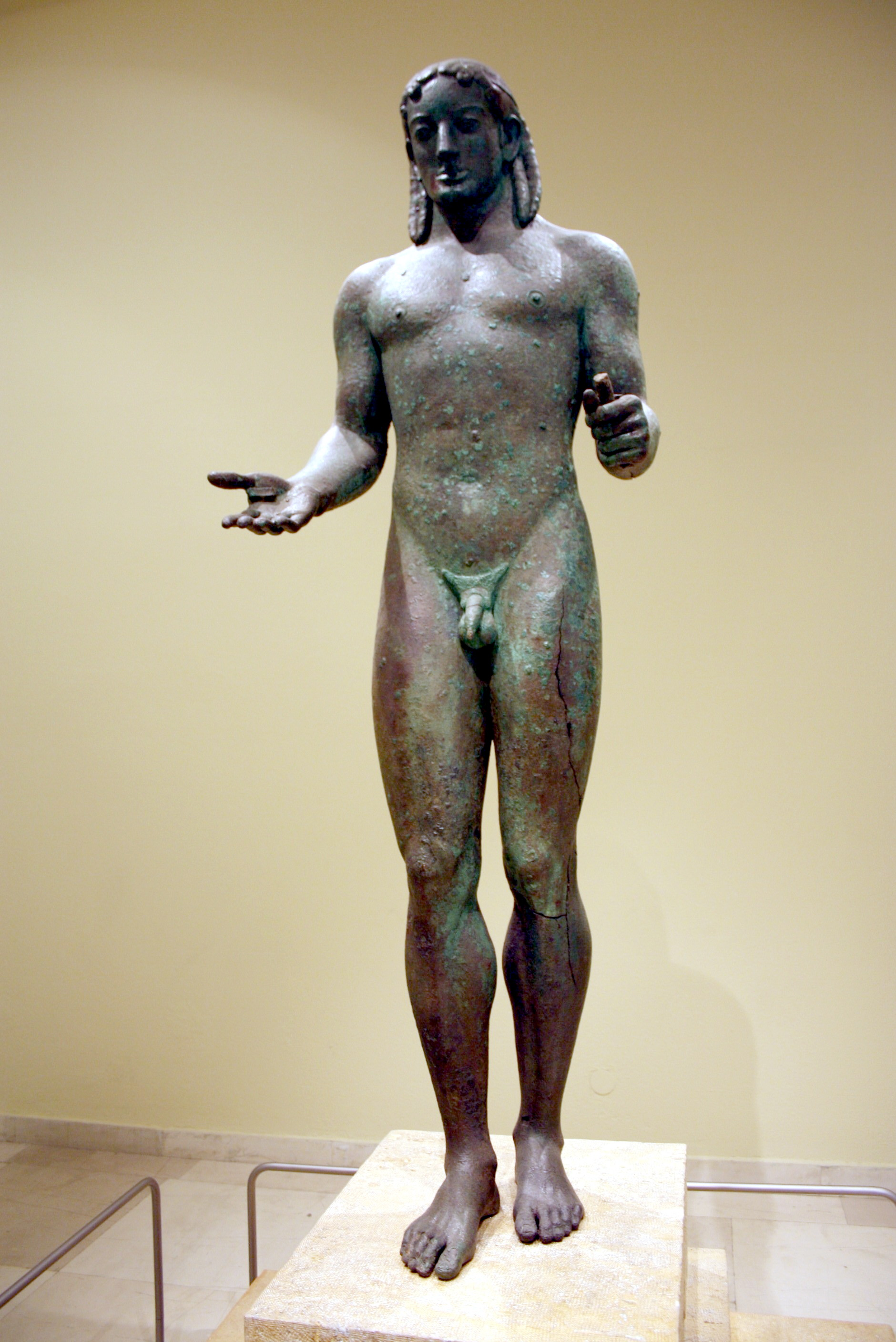
Apollo, one of the Twelve Olympians, 530–500 BCE

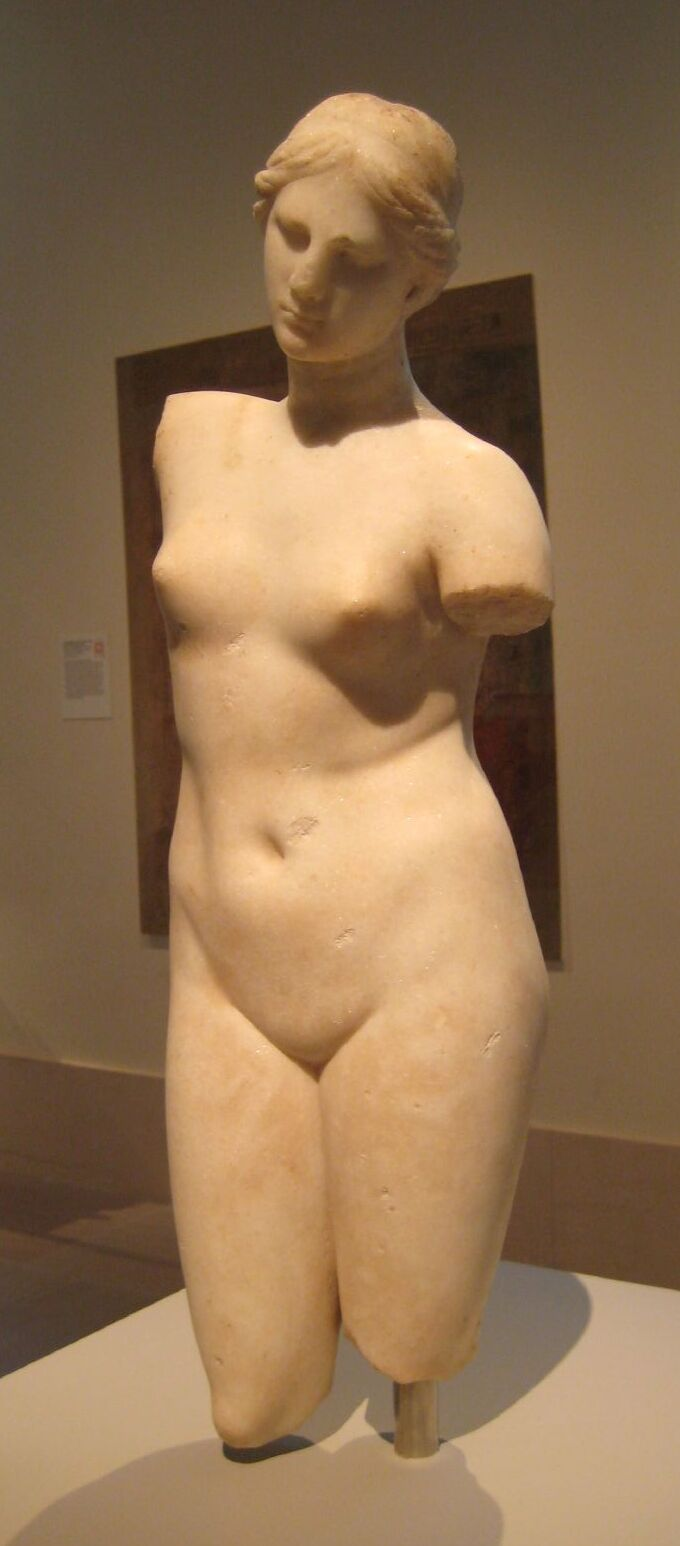
Aphrodite, 2nd century BCE

Male nudity was celebrated in ancient Greece to a greater degree than any culture before or since. The status of freedom, maleness, privilege, and physical virtues were asserted by discarding everyday clothing for athletic nudity. Nudity became a ritual costume by association of the naked body with the beauty and power of the gods who were depicted as perfect naked humans. In Etruscan and early Roman athletics, in which masculinity involved prudishness and paranoia about effeminacy, the Greek traditions were not maintained because public nudity became associated with homoeroticism. In the Roman Empire (27 BCE – 476 CE), the status of the upper classes was such that nudity was of no concern for men, and for women only if seen by their social superiors. At the Roman baths (thermae), which had social functions similar to a modern beach, mixed nude bathing may have been the norm up to the fourth century CE.

=== Colonialism and racism ===
The encounter between the Indigenous cultures of Africa, the Americas and Oceania with Europeans had a significant effect on all cultures. Because clothing and body adornments are such an important part of nonverbal communications, the relative lack of body coverings was one of the first things explorers noticed when they encountered Indigenous peoples of the tropics. Non-western cultures during the period were naked only by comparison to Western norms. The genitals or entire lower body of adults were covered by garments in most situations, while the upper body of both men and women might be unclothed. However, lacking the western concept of shame regarding the body, such garments might be removed in public for practical or ceremonial purposes. Children until puberty and sometimes women until marriage might be naked.

All humans lived in hunter-gatherer societies until 20,000 years ago, and they were naked. In the tropical regions of Africa, Australia, the Americas and Southeast Asia, this way of life continued until a few hundred years ago. Perhaps the last uncontacted hunter-gatherers are the community of a few hundred individuals on one of the Andaman Islands. The Europeans who first contacted tropical peoples reported that they were unashamedly naked, only occasionally wrapping themselves in capes in colder weather. Many pastoral societies in warmer climates are also minimally clothed or naked while working. This practice continued when western clothing was first introduced; for example, Aboriginal Australians in 1819 wore only the jackets they were given, but not pants. Western ambivalence could be expressed by responding to the nakedness of natives as either a sign of rampant sexuality or of the innocence that preceded the "fall of man".

== Cultural differences ==
Norms related to nudity are associated with norms regarding personal freedom, human sexuality, and gender roles, which vary widely among contemporary societies. Situations where private or public nudity is accepted vary. Indigenous peoples retain pre-colonial norms to varying degrees. People in Western cultures may practice social nudity within the confines of semi-private facilities such as naturist resorts, while other seek more open acceptance of nudity in everyday life and in public spaces designated as clothing-optional.

=== Africa ===
In the Islamic societies of Africa, nudity is forbidden, while in sub-Saharan countries that never abandoned—or are reasserting—pre-colonial norms, partial or complete nudity is accepted as natural. In contemporary rural villages, both boys and girls are allowed to play totally nude, and women bare their breasts in the belief that the meaning of naked bodies is not limited to sexuality. Full or partial nudity is observed among some Burkinabese and Nilo-Saharan (e.g. Nuba and Surma people)—during particular occasions; for example, stick-fighting tournaments in Ethiopia. In Lagos, Nigeria, some parents continue to allow children to be naked until puberty. There is now an issue with strangers taking photographs, and they worry about pedophiles, but want kids to grow up with a positive body image and have the same freedom they remember from their own childhood. The upper torso of women is not sexual due to the general acceptance of breastfeeding in Africa, while their legs are covered by skirts to a greater extent than by Western clothing.

Traditional Sub-Saharan African dress
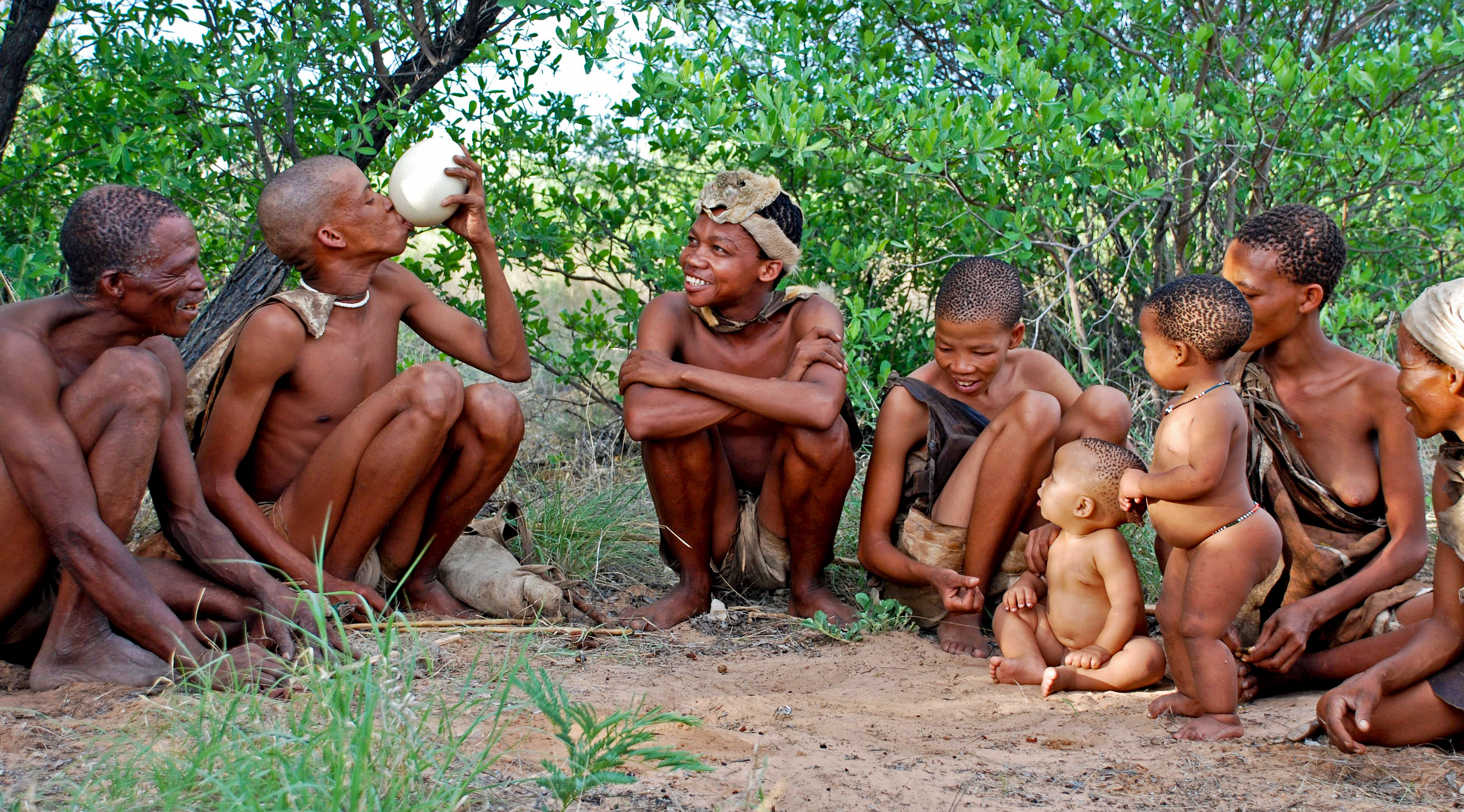
Hunter-gatherer family of southern Africa, often called Bushmen or San by outsiders.

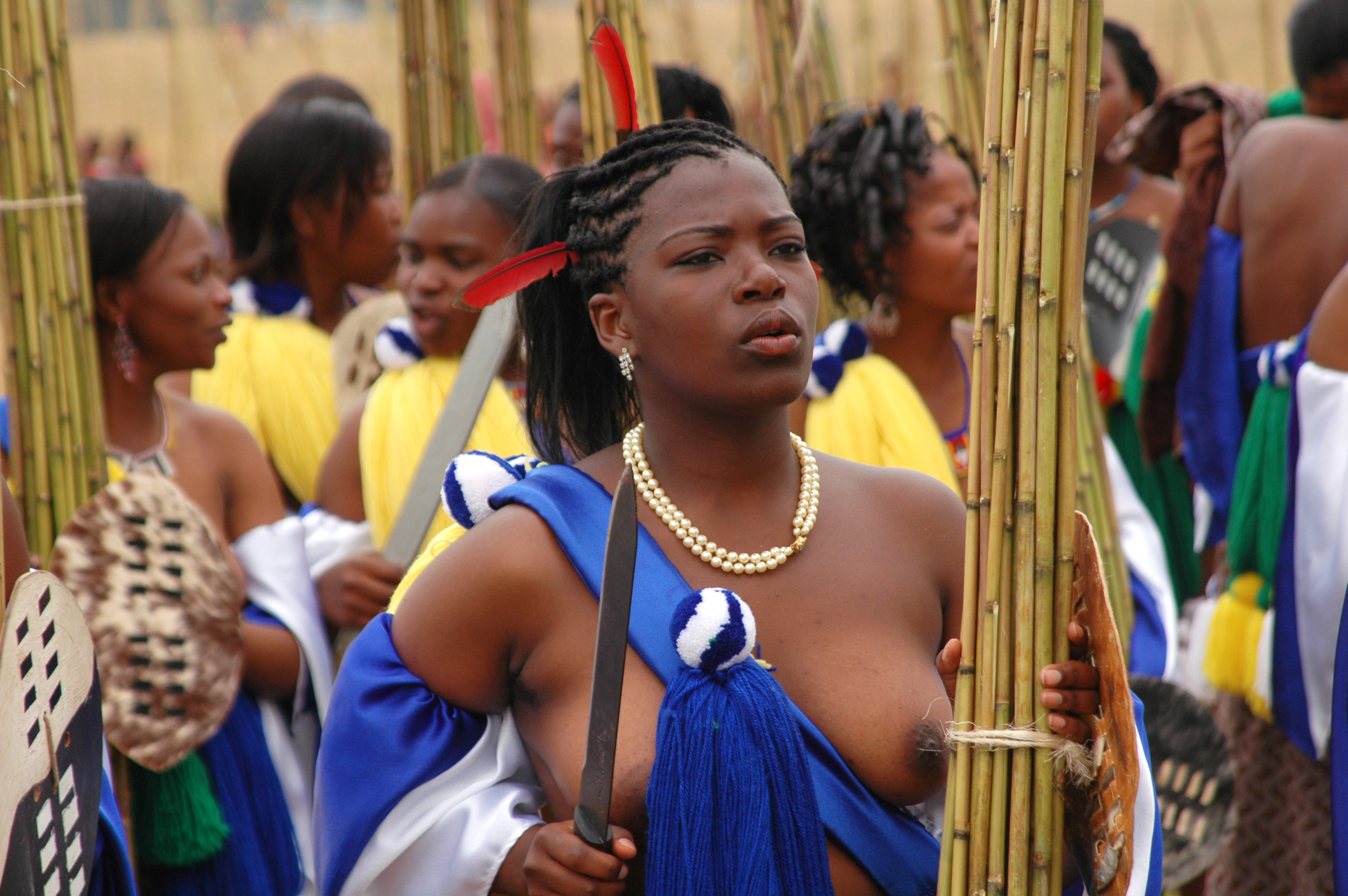
A Swazi woman participating in the Umhlanga ceremony in Eswatini – 2006

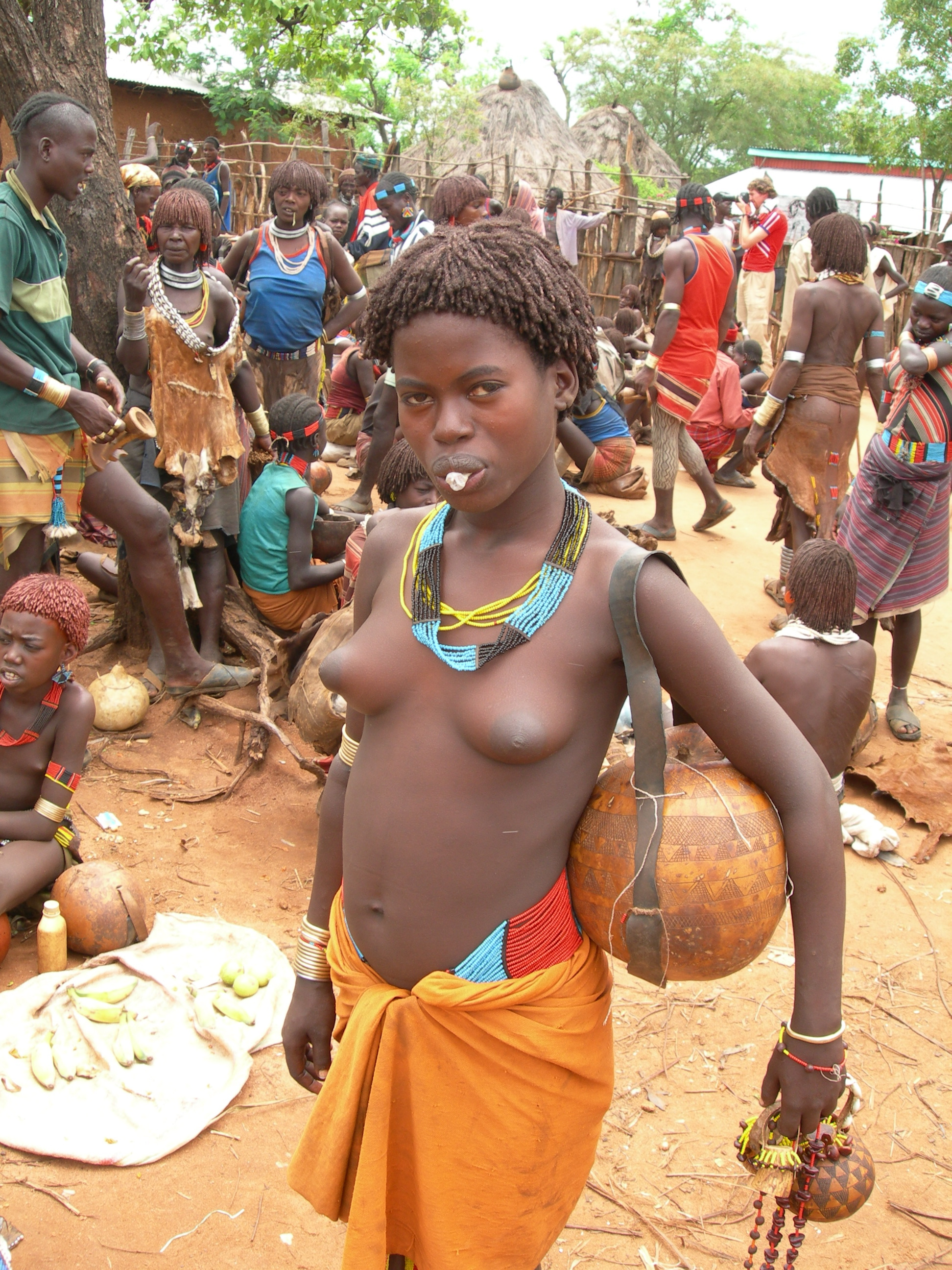
Young Hamer woman in southern Ethiopia (near Turmi) – 2006

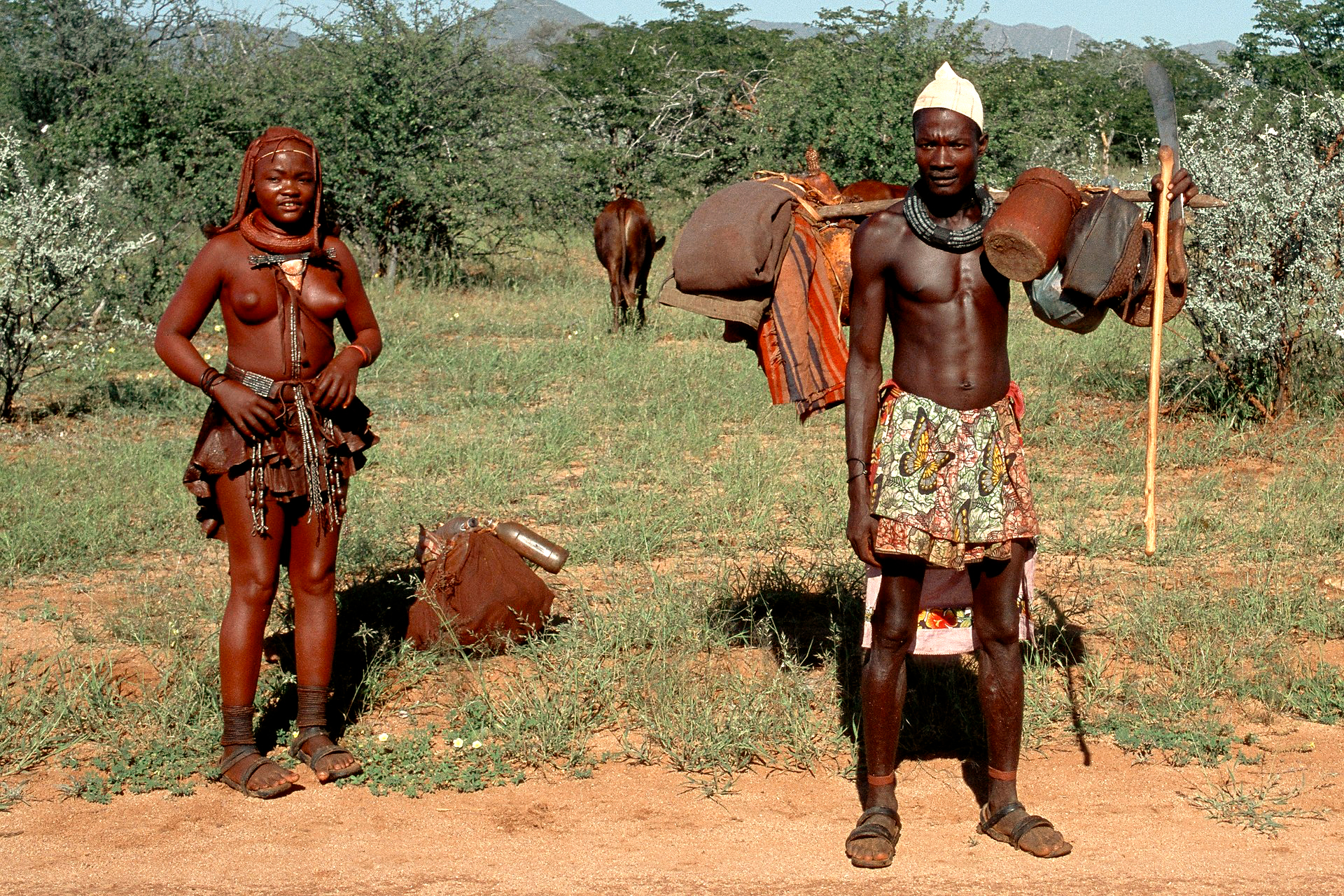
Himba herders the Kaokoveld desert

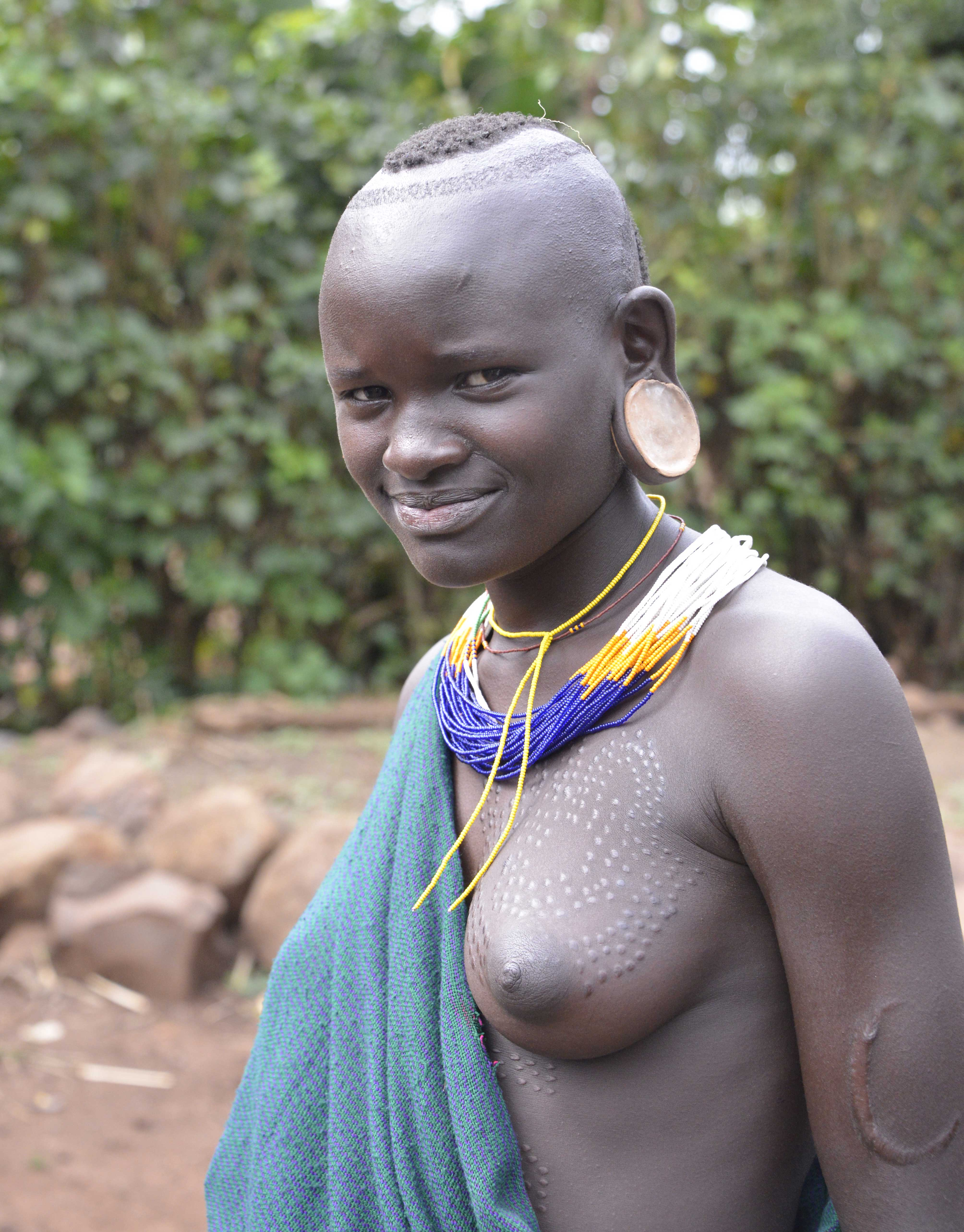
Beauty scarification, Suri tribe, Ethiopia – 2016

The revival of pre-colonial culture is asserted in the adoption of traditional dress—young women wearing only beaded skirts and jewelry—in the Umkhosi Womhlanga (Reed Dance) by the Zulu and Swazi. Other examples of cultural tourism reflect the visitor's desire to experience what they imagine being an exotic culture, which includes nudity.

=== Asia ===
In Asian countries, rather than always being immoral or shameful, not being properly dressed is perceived as a breach of etiquette (loss of face) in most situations, while nakedness may be part of maintaining purity by public bathing, or expressing rejection of worldliness including clothes.

==== Bangladesh ====
In Bangladesh, the Mru people have resisted centuries of Muslim and Christian pressure to clothe their nakedness as part of religious conversion. Most retain their own religion, which includes elements of Buddhism and Animism, as well as traditional clothing: a loincloth for men and a skirt for women.

==== China ====
In contemporary China, while maintaining the traditions of modest dress in everyday life, the use of nudity in magazine advertising indicates the effect of globalization. In much of Asia, traditional dress covers the entire body, similar to Western dress. In stories written in China as early as the fourth century BCE, nudity is presented as an affront to human dignity, reflecting the belief that "humanness" in Chinese society is not innate, but is earned by correct behavior. However, nakedness could also be used by an individual to express contempt for others in their presence. In other stories, the nudity of women, emanating the power of yin, could nullify the yang of aggressive forces.

==== India ====
In India, the conventions regarding proper dress do not apply to monks in some Hindu and Jain sects who reject clothing as worldly. Although overwhelmingly male, there have been female ascetics such as Akka Mahadevi who also renounced clothing. Although naked, Mahadevi is generally depicted as entirely covered by her long hair.

Asian dress
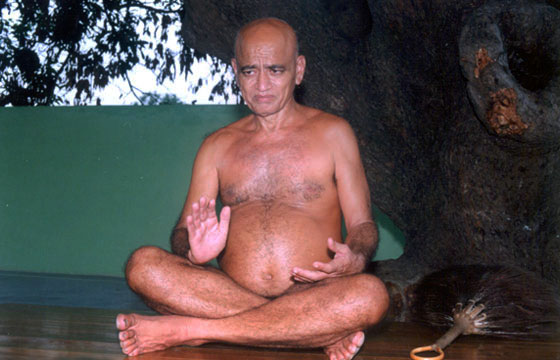
Acharya Vidyasagar, a contemporary Digambara Jain monk

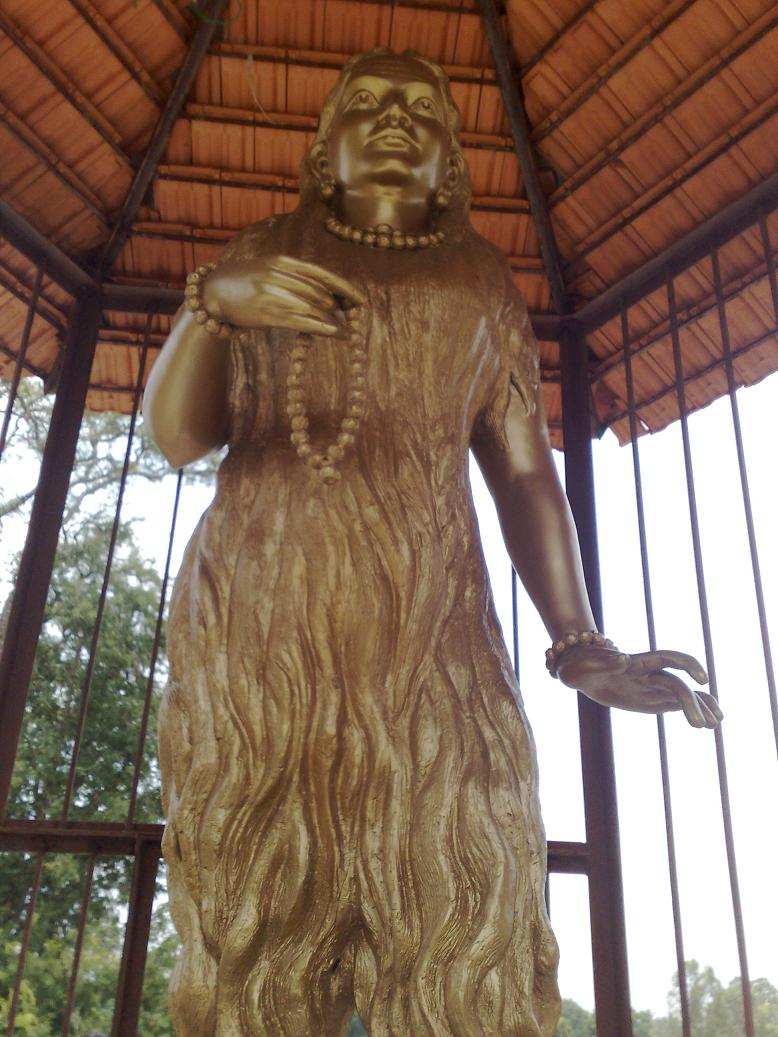
Statue of Akka Mahadevi with her body covered by her hair

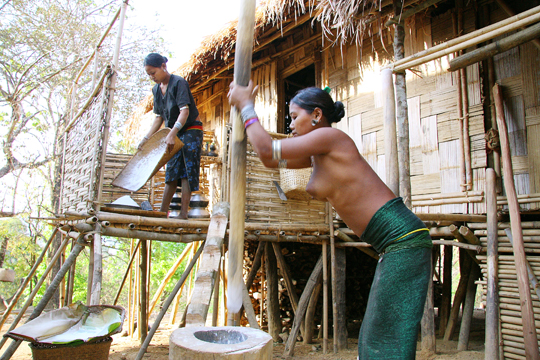
Mru women working in a village in Bangladesh. One of them is wearing traditional clothing.

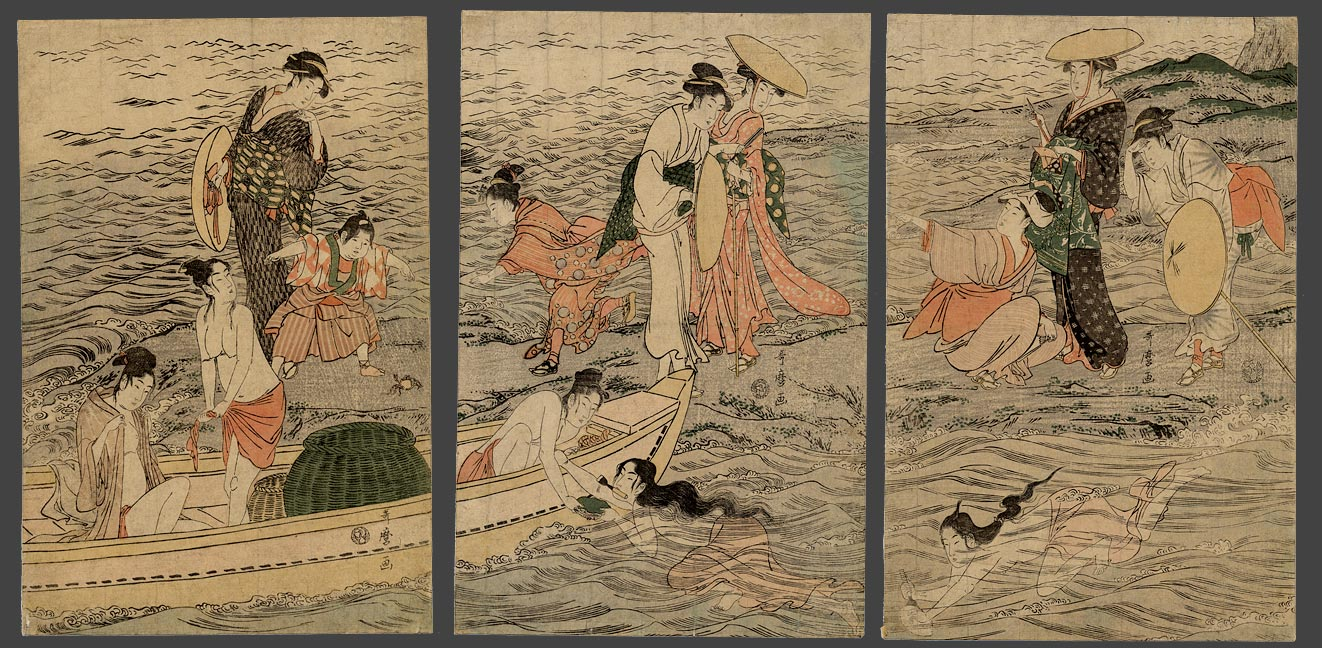
Triptych Ukiyo-e print of Japanese ama divers catching abalone (1788–1790) by Utamaro

==== Japan ====
The Tokugawa period in Japan (1603–1868) was defined by the social dominance of hereditary classes, with clothing a regulated marker of status and little nudity among the upper classes. However, working populations in both rural and urban areas often dressed only in fundoshi (similar to a loincloth), including women in hot weather and while nursing. Lacking baths in their homes, everyone frequented public bathhouses where they were unclothed together. This communal nudity might extend to other activities in rural villages.

With the opening of Japan to European visitors in the Meiji era (1868–1912), the previously normal states of undress, and the custom of mixed public bathing, became an issue for leaders concerned with Japan's international reputation. A law was established with fines for those that violated the ban on undress. Although often ignored or circumvented, the law had the effect of sexualizing the naked body in situations that had not previously been erotic.

Public bathing for purification as well as cleanliness is part of both Shintoism and Buddhism in Japan. Purification in the bath is not only for the body, but the heart or spirit (kokoro). Public baths (sentō) were once common, but became less so with the addition of bathtubs in homes. Sentō were mixed gender (konyoku) until the arrival of Western influences, but became segregated by gender in cities. Nudity is required at Japanese hot spring resorts (onsen). Some resorts continue to be mixed gender, but the number is declining as they cease to be supported by local communities.

==== Korea ====
In Korea, bathhouses are known as jjimjilbang. Such facilities may include mixed-sex sauna areas where clothing is worn, but bathing areas where nudity is required are gender segregated.

=== Oceania ===
Prior to the European colonization of New Zealand, Māori people went naked or partially clothed in casual settings as the climate allowed, although they did wear clothing to keep out the weather and denote social status. Men frequently wore nothing but a belt with a piece of string attached holding their foreskin shut over their glans penis. There was no shame or modesty attached to women's breasts, and therefore no garments devoted to concealing them; however, women did cover their pubic area in the presence of men, as exposing it was a cultural expression of anger and contempt. Pre-pubescent children wore no clothes at all. European colonists cited nudity as a sign of Māori racial inferiority, calling them "naked savages".

On the islands of Yap State, dances by women in traditional dress that does not cover the breasts are now included in the Catholic celebration of Christmas and Easter.

=== Russia ===
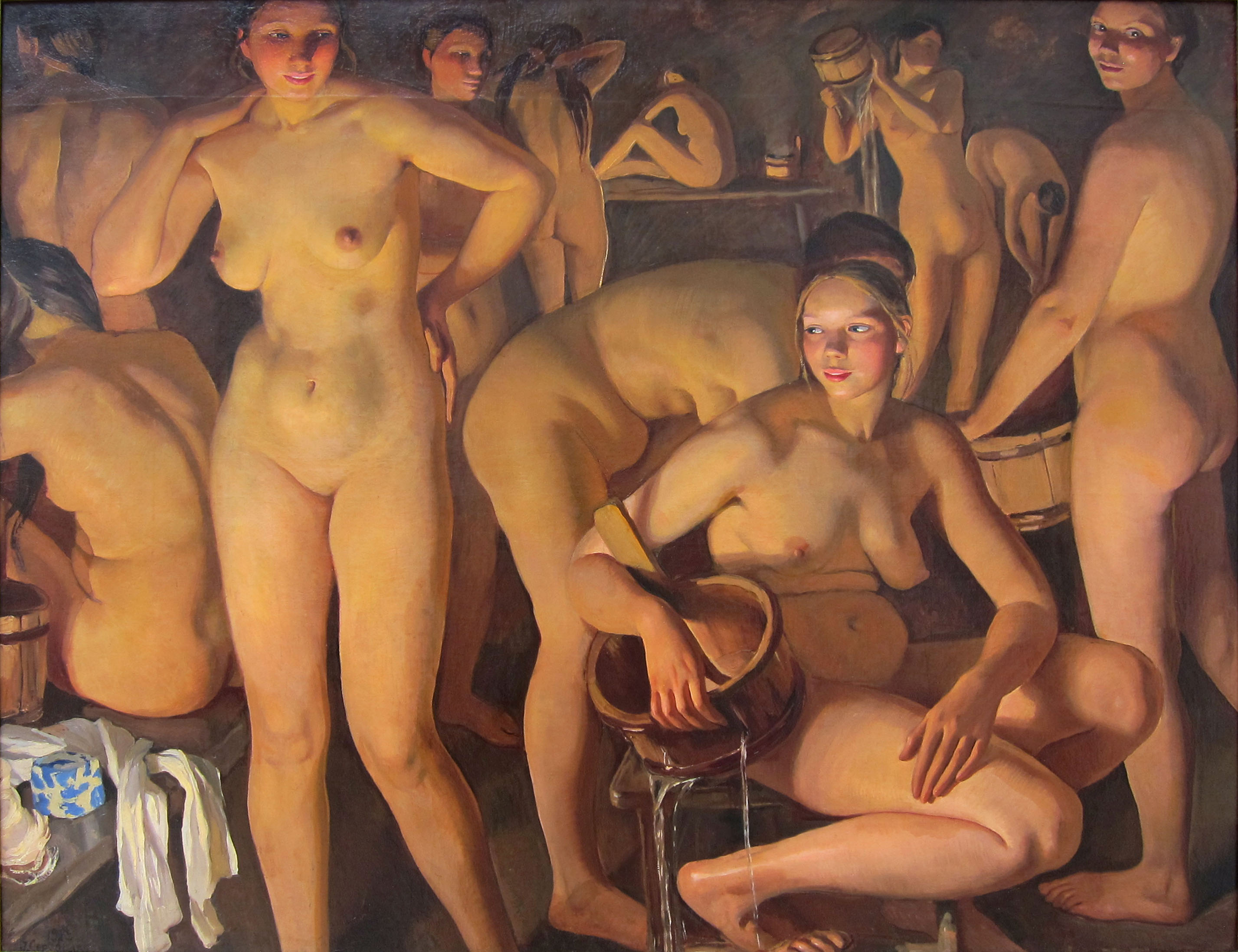
Banya (1913) by Zinaida Serebriakova

Although geographically located in both Asia and Europe, Russia is more culturally Western, 80% of the population being Slavs living in the European third of the country.

Communal banyas have been used for over a thousand years, serving both hygienic and social functions. Nudity and mixed sex usage was typical for much of this history. While first attempts to ban mixed sex nudity in banyas date back to 1551, and more systemic attempts were made from 1741 to 1782, the practice fully came to an end only by the beginning of 19th century. Bathing facilities in homes threatened the existence of public banyas, but social functions maintained their popularity.

In the years immediately following the Russian Revolution in 1917, one of the cultural movements was "Down With Shame!" (Долой стыд!). This movement was supported by Vladimir Lenin, who was sympathetic to naturism after visiting Germany. Clothing optional recreation was more often practiced, and nude demonstrations in cities viewed clothing and sexual repression as part of class repression. However, soon after the death of Lenin, Down With Shame soon fell out of favor with the rise of Stalinism in the 1930s.

=== South America ===
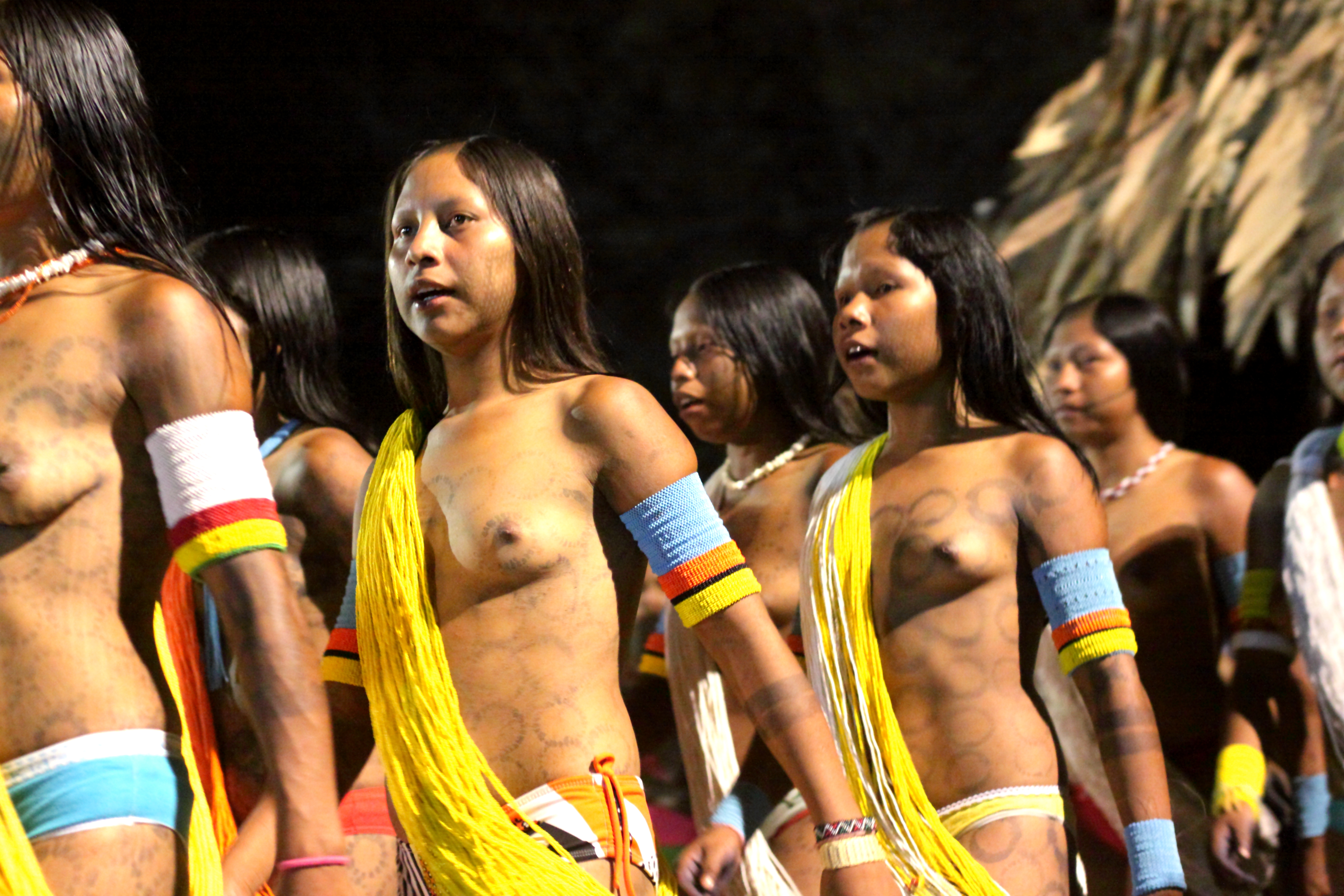
Kayapo women, Pará State, Brazil

In Brazil, the Yawalapiti—an Indigenous Xingu tribe in the Amazon Basin—practice a funeral ritual known as Quarup to celebrate life, death and rebirth. The ritual involves the presentation of all young girls who have begun menstruating since the last Quarup and whose time has come to choose a partner. The Awá hunters, the male members of an Indigenous people of Brazil living in the eastern Amazon rainforest, are "completely naked except for a piece of string decorated with bright bird feathers tied to the end of their penises". This minimalist dress code reflects the spirit of the hunt and being overdressed may be considered ridiculous or inappropriate.

=== Western societies ===
The Western world inherited contradictory cultural traditions relating to nudity in various contexts. The first tradition came from the ancient Greeks, who saw the naked body as the natural state and as essentially positive. The second is based upon the Abrahamic religions—Judaism, Christianity, and Islam—which view being naked as shameful and essentially negative. The interaction between the Greek classical and later Abrahamic traditions has resulted in Western ambivalence, with nudity acquiring both positive and negative meanings in individual psychology, in social life, and in depictions such as art. The conservative versions of these religions continue to prohibit public and sometimes also private nudity. While public modesty prevails in more recent times, organized groups of nudists or naturists emerged with the stated purpose of regaining a natural connection to the human body and nature, sometimes in private spaces but also in public. Naturism in the United States, meanwhile, remains largely confined to private facilities, with few "clothing optional" public spaces compared to Europe. In spite of the liberalization of attitudes toward sex, Americans remain uncomfortable with complete nudity at the end of the 20th century. A poll in 2025 found that Americans are divided: 25% saying they like or love being naked, 25% saying they dislike or hate it, and 50% saying they are neutral or refusing to say. Two-third of Americans responded they are self-conscious about their physical appearance.

==== Moral ambiguity ====
The moral ambiguity of nudity is reflected in its many meanings, often expressed in the metaphors used to describe cultural values, both positive and negative.

One of the first—but now obsolete—meanings of nude in the 16th century was "mere, plain, open, explicit" as reflected in the modern metaphors "the naked truth" and "the bare facts". Naturists often speak of their nakedness in terms of a return to the innocence and simplicity of childhood. The term naturism is based upon the idea that nakedness is connected to nature positively as a form of egalitarianism, that all humans are alike in their nakedness. Nudity also represents freedom: the liberation of the body is associated with sexual liberation, although many naturists tend to downplay this connection. In some forms of group psychotherapy, nudity has been used to promote open interaction and communication. Religious persons who reject the world as it is including all possessions may practice nudism, or use nakedness as a protest against an unjust world.

Many of the negative associations of nakedness are the inverse of positive ones. If nudity is truth, nakedness may be an invasion of privacy or the exposure of uncomfortable truths, a source of anxiety. To be deprived of clothes is punishment, humiliating and degrading. Rather than being natural, nakedness is associated with sin, criminality, and punishment. The strong connection of nudity to sex produces shame when naked in contexts where sexuality is deemed inappropriate. The connection of nakedness with the corruptibility of flesh and death may have biblical origins, but gained real world associations during epidemics in the Middle Ages.

Confronted with this ambiguity, some individuals seek to resolve it by working toward greater acceptance of nudity for themselves and others. Although the psychologist Keon West found positive effects from short-term participation in social nudity, such as an improved body image, the sociologist Barbara Górnicka found that lasting change is a gradual process of social learning similar to other forms of group socialization. However, the philosopher Krista Thomason notes that negative emotions including shame exist because they are functional, and that human beings are not perfect.

=== Abrahamic religions ===
The meaning of the naked body in Judaism, Christianity, and Islam is based upon the Genesis creation narrative, but each religion has their own interpretation. What is shared by all was various degrees of modest dress and the avoidance of nakedness.

J. David Velleman claims that the meaning of the creation myth is inconsistent with a philosophical analysis of shame as an emotion of reflective self-assessment which is understood as a response to being seen by others, a social context that did not exist. He says the response of Adam and Eve to cover their bodies indicates that upon gaining knowledge of good and evil, they became aware of nakedness as intrinsically shameful, which contradicts their intrinsic goodness "before the fall". According to German philosopher Thorsten Botz-Bornstein, interpretations of Genesis have placed responsibility for the fall of man and original sin on Eve, and, therefore, all women. As a result, the nudity of women is deemed more shameful personally and corrupting to society than the nakedness of men.

==== Christianity ====
The meaning of nudity for early Christians was the baptism, which was originally by full immersion and without clothes in a basin attached to every cathedral. Both men and women were baptized naked, deaconesses performing the rite for women to maintain modesty. Until the fifth century CE, pagan nudity was associated with sex, Christian nudity with grace. Jesus was originally depicted nude as would have been the case in Roman crucifixions, but the Christian adoption of the pagan association of the body with sex prompted the clothing of Christ. Some clerics went further, to hatred and fear of the body, insisting that monks sleep fully dressed.

Christian theology rarely addresses nudity, but rather proper dress and modesty. Western cultures adopted Greek heritage only with regard to art, the ideal nude. Real naked people remained shameful, and become human only when they cover their nakedness. In one of a series of lectures entitled "Theology of the Body" given in 1979, Pope John Paul II said that the innocent nudity of being before the fall is regained only between loving spouses. In daily life, Christianity requires clothing in public, but with great variation between and within societies as to the meaning of "public" and how much of the body is covered. Finnish Lutherans practice mixed nudity in private saunas used by families and close-knit groups. While maintaining communal nudity, men and women are now often separated in public or community settings. Certain sects of Christianity through history have included nudity into worship practices, but these have been deemed heretical. There have been Christian naturists in the United States since the 1920s, but as a social and recreational practice rather than part of an organized religion.

==== Islam ====
Islamic countries are guided by rules of modesty that forbid nudity, with variations between five schools of Islamic law. The most conservative is the Hanbali School in Saudi Arabia and Qatar, where the niqab, the garment covering the whole female body and the face with a narrow opening for the eyes, is widespread. Hands are also hidden within sleeves as much as possible. The burqa, limited mainly to Afghanistan, also has a mesh screen which covers the eye opening. Different rules apply to men, women, and children; and depend upon the gender and family relationship of others present.

== Sex and gender differences ==
In Western cultures, shame can result from not living up to the ideals of society with regard to physical appearance. Historically, such shame has affected women more than men. With regard to their naked bodies, the result is a tendency toward self-criticism by women, while men are less concerned by the evaluation of others. In patriarchal societies, which include much of the world, norms regarding proper attire and behavior are stricter for women than for men, and the judgements for violation of these norms are more severe.

=== Female nudity ===
==== Topfreedom ====
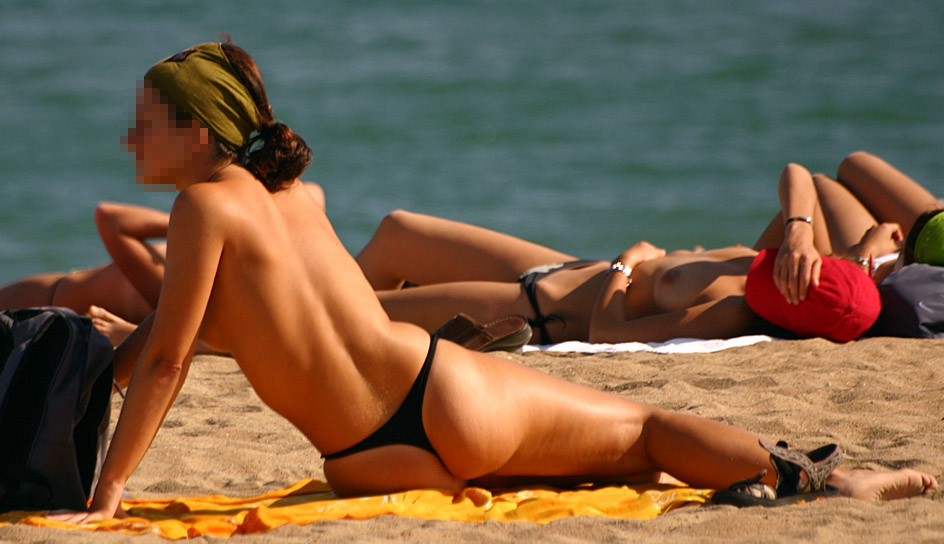
In many European countries, women may sunbathe without covering their breasts.

In much of the world, the modesty of women is a matter not only of social custom but of the legal definition of indecent exposure. In the United States, the exposure of female nipples is a criminal offense in many states and is not usually allowed in public. Individual women who have contested indecency laws by baring their breasts in public assert that their behavior is not sexual. In Canada, the law was changed to include a definition of a sexual context in order for behavior to be indecent. The topfreedom movement in the United States promotes equal rights for women to be naked above the waist in public on the same basis that would apply to men in the same circumstances. Advocates of topfreedom view its illegality as the institutionalization of negative cultural values that affect women's body image. The legal justifications for topfreedom include equal protection, the right to privacy, and freedom of expression.

The law in New York State was challenged in 1986 by nine women who exposed their breasts in a public park, which led to nine years of litigation culminating with an opinion by the Court of Appeals that overturned the convictions on the basis of the women's actions not being lewd, rather than overturning the law as unconstitutional on the basis of equal protection, which is what the women sought. While the decision gave women more freedom to be topfree (e.g. while sunbathing), it did not give them equality with men. Other court decisions have given individuals the right to be briefly nude in public as a form of expression protected by the First Amendment, but not on a continuing basis for their own comfort or enjoyment as men are allowed to do. In 2020 the US Supreme Court refused to hear the appeal of three women after the New Hampshire Supreme Court found that the state law does not discriminate against women because it bans nudity, which has traditionally included female breasts.

==== Breastfeeding ====
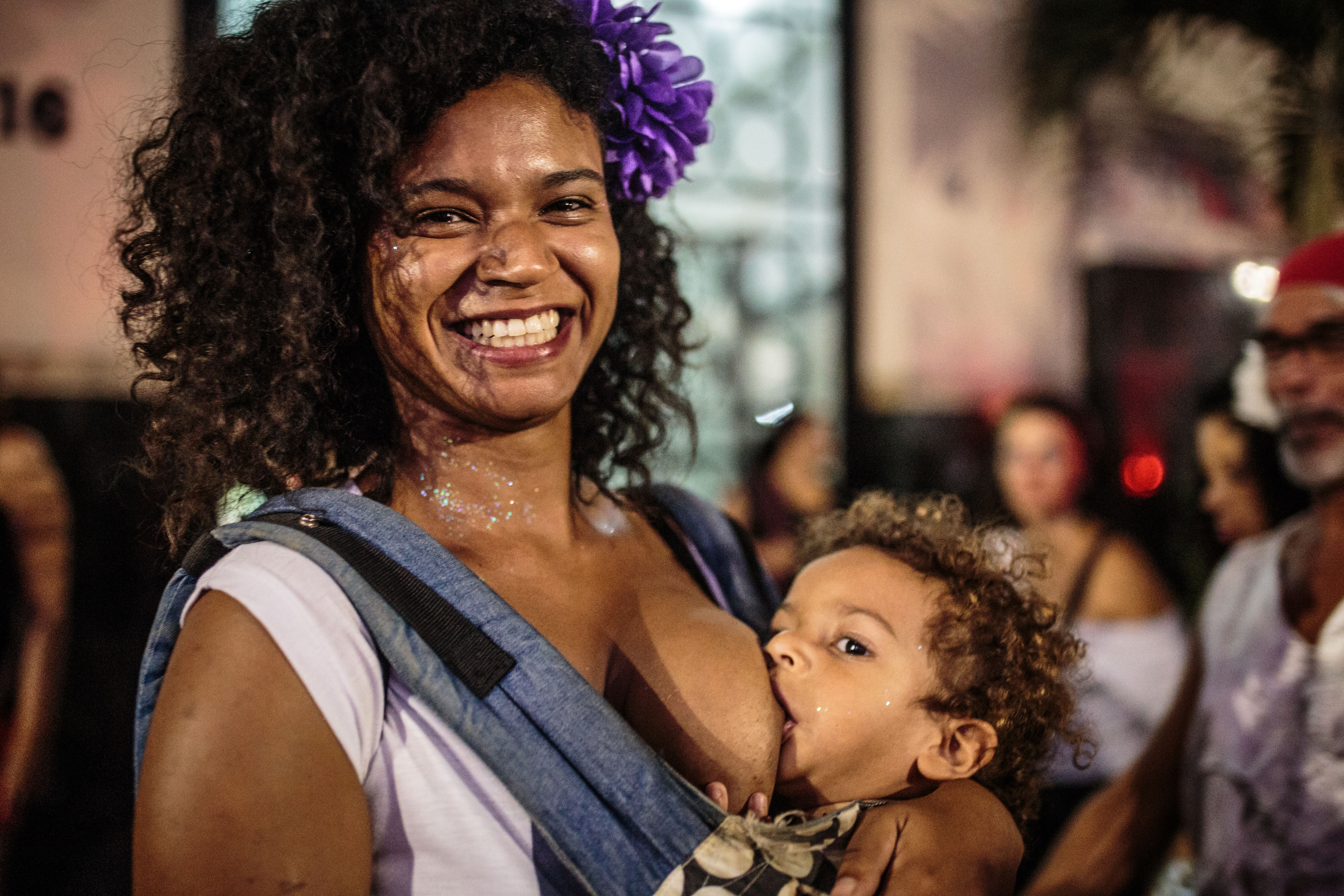
A woman breastfeeding in Rio de Janeiro, Brazil, 2017

Breastfeeding in public may be forbidden in some jurisdictions, unregulated in others, or protected as a legal right in public and the workplace. Where public breastfeeding is unregulated or legal, mothers may be reluctant to do so because other people may object. The issue of breastfeeding is part of the sexualization of the breast in many cultures, and the perception of threat in what others perceive as non-sexual. Pope Francis came out in support of public breastfeeding at church services soon after assuming the Papacy.

=== Male nudity ===
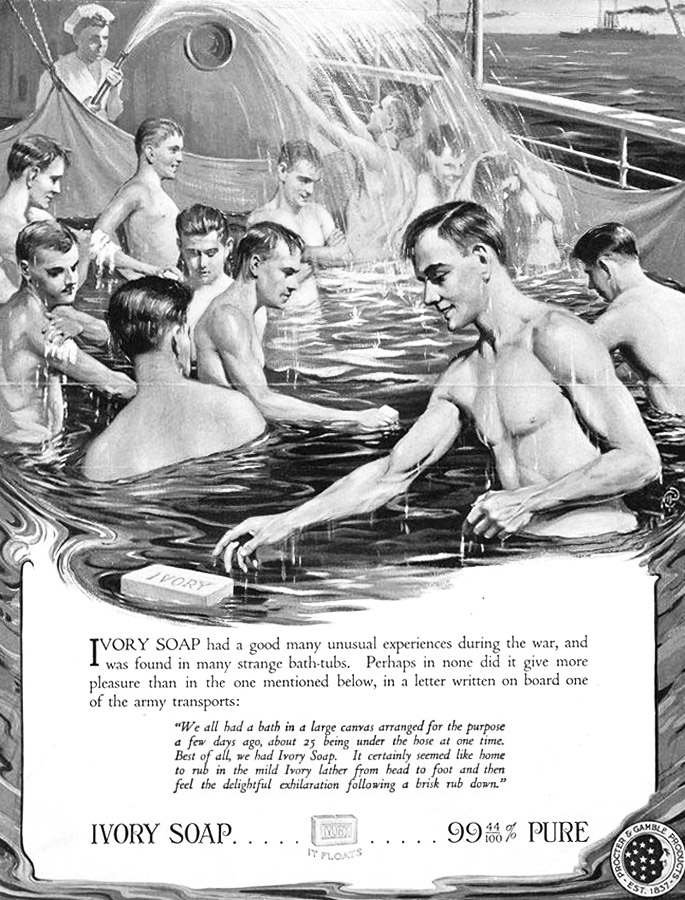
WWI era Ivory Soap ad

Historically, men and boys bathed and swam nude in secluded rivers and lakes. In England when sea bathing became popular in the 18th century, beaches were initially male only, but with the easier access of the 19th century due to rail transportation, the mixing of genders became a problem for authorities. The addition of "bathing machines" at seaside resorts was not successful in maintaining standards of decency, men often continuing to be nude while women wore bathing costumes. However, public concern was only regarding adults, it being generally accepted that boys at English beaches would be nude. This prompted complaints by visiting Americans, but Englishmen had no objection to their daughters being fully dressed on the beach with naked boys.

In the United States and other Western countries for much of the 20th century, male nudity was the norm in gender segregated activities including summer camps, swimming pools and communal showers based on cultural beliefs that females need more privacy than males. Beginning in 1900, businessmen swam nude at private athletic clubs in New York City, which ended with a 1980 law requiring the admission of women. For younger boys, lack of modesty might include public behavior as in 1909 when The New York Times reported that at an elementary school public swimming competition the youngest boys competed in the nude.

Hygiene was given as the reason for official guidelines requiring nudity in indoor pools used only by men. Swimmers were also required to take nude showers with soap prior to entering the pool, in order to eliminate contaminants and inspect swimmers to prohibit use by those with signs of disease. During women's weekly swim hours, simple one-piece suits were allowed and sometimes supplied by the facility to ensure hygiene; towels were also supplied.

Compared to the acceptance of boys being nude, an instance in 1947 where girls were given the same option lasted only six weeks in Highland Park, Michigan before a protest by mothers. However, only the middle school required suits, the elementary schools in the same district continued to allow girls to swim nude. The public health recommendation of male nudity continued officially until 1962 but was observed into the 1970s by the YMCA and schools with gender segregated classes. The era of male nude swimming in indoor pools declined steadily as mixed-gender usage became the norm, and sped up following the passage of Title IX of the Education Amendments of 1972. Eventually all pools use became mixed-gender, and in the 21st century, the practice of male nude swimming is largely forgotten, or denied as having ever existed.

=== Gender equality ===
Social acceptance of mixed gender nudity due to sauna culture is associated with greater gender equality, which is highest in Iceland, Norway, Finland and Sweden (the US being #53 of 153 countries listed). America and the Netherlands went through the same period of feminist activism in the 1960s–70s, but Dutch men were generally more open to the idea of gender equality, there being a prior history of regarding sexuality as healthy and normal, including nudity not always being sexual.

== Child development ==
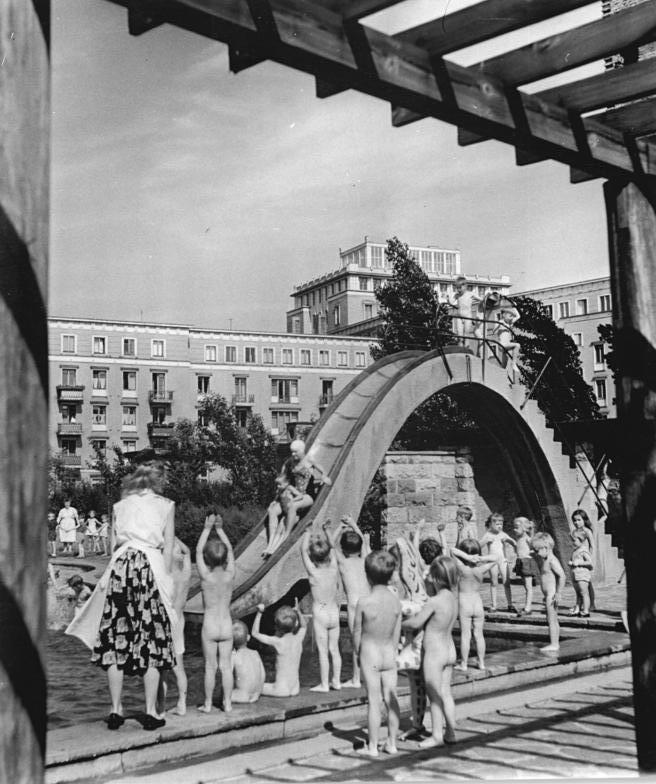
Bathing in the center of East Berlin, East Germany (1958)

A report issued in 2009 on child sexual development in the United States by the National Child Traumatic Stress Network asserted that children have a natural curiosity about their own bodies and the bodies of others. The report recommended that parents learn what is normal in regard to nudity and sexuality at each stage of a child's development and refrain from overreacting to their children's nudity-related behaviors unless there are signs of a problem (e.g. anxiety, aggression, or sexual interactions between children not of the same age or stage of development). Problematic childhood behavior often takes place in daycare, rather than home environments. The general advice for caregivers is to find ways of setting boundaries without giving the child a sense of shame.

In Northern European countries, where family nudity is normal, children learn from an early age that nakedness need not be sexual. Bodily modesty is not part of the Finnish identity due to the universal use of the sauna, a historical tradition that has been maintained. Bonny Rough, who raised her children while residing in the United States and the Netherlands, advises US parents and caregivers to understand that a child's explorations of their own and others' bodies are motivated by curiosity, not anything similar to adult sexuality. A 2009 report issued by the CDC comparing the sexual health of teens in France, Germany, the Netherlands and the United States concluded that if the US implemented comprehensive sex education similar to the three European countries there would be a significant reduction in teen pregnancies, abortions and the rate of sexually transmitted diseases, and the US would save hundreds of millions of dollars.

== Private versus public ==
In thinking about nudity, an important dimension of culture is private-public and the behavior that is normal within each space. In some cultures private means being entirely alone, defining personal space. In other cultures, privacy includes family and selected others; intimate space. Being in public includes potentially anyone as with parks, sidewalks, and roads. Some public spaces are limited to paying customers as with cafés or supermarkets. The meaning of public space changed as cities grew. Between private and public there may be other distinctions that limit access such as age, sex, membership, which define social spaces, each with expectations of shared norms being followed.

In the absence of visual barriers, privacy is maintained by social distance, as when being examined for medical purposes or receiving a massage. Violation of boundaries between doctors and patients is a serious breach of medical ethics. Between social equals, privacy is maintained by civil inattention, allowing others to maintain their personal space by only glancing, not looking directly, as in a crowded elevator. Civil inattention also maintains the non-sexual nature of semi-public situations in which relative or complete nakedness is necessary, such as communal bathing or changing clothes. Such activities are regulated by participants negotiating behaviors that avoid sexualization. A particular example is open water swimming in the United Kingdom, which by necessity means changing outdoors in mixed gender groups with minimal or no privacy. As a participant stated, "Open water swimming and nudity go hand in hand...People don't necessarily talk about it, but just know if you join a swimming club it's likely you will see far more genitalia than you were perhaps expecting." (Note: Nudity occurs while changing, not in the water; among open water swimmers a naked swimmer is someone who wears a standard swimsuit, most now wear a wetsuit.) In the 21st century, many situations have become sexualized by media portrayals of any nudity as a prelude to sex.

=== Sexual and non-sexual nudity ===
The social context defines the cultural meaning of nudity that may range from the sacred to the profane. There are activities where freedom of movement is promoted by full or partial nudity. The nudity of the ancient Olympics was part of a religious practice. Athletic activities are also appreciated for the beauty of bodies in motion (as in dance), but in the post-modern media athletic bodies are often taken out of context to become purely sexual, perhaps pornographic.

The sexual nature of nudity is defined by the gaze of others. Studies of naturism find that its practitioners adopt behaviors and norms that suppress the sexual responses while practicing social nudity. Such norms include refraining from staring, touching, or otherwise calling attention to the body while naked. However, some naturists do not maintain this non-sexual atmosphere, as when nudist resorts host sexually oriented events.

=== Concepts of privacy ===
Societies in continental Europe think of privacy as protecting a right to respect and personal dignity. Europeans maintain their dignity, even naked where others may see them, including sunbathing in urban parks. In Amsterdam, people are not shy about being naked in their homes, and do not use shades to prevent being seen from outside. In America, the right to privacy is oriented toward values of liberty, especially in one's home. Americans see nakedness where others may see as surrendering "any reasonable expectation of privacy". Such cultural differences may make some laws and behaviors of other societies seem incomprehensible, since each culture assumes that their own concepts of privacy are intuitive, and thus human universals.

==== High- and low-context cultures ====
The concepts of high-context and low-context cultures were introduced by anthropologist Edward T. Hall. The behaviors and norms of a high-context culture depend upon shared implicit norms that operate within a social situation, while in a low-context culture behavior is more dependent upon explicit communications. An example of this distinction was found in research on the behavior of French and German naturists on a nude beach. Germans, who are extremely low in cultural context, maintain public propriety on a nude beach by not wearing adornments, avoiding touching themselves and others, and any other behaviors that would call attention to the body. By contrast, the French, in their personal lives, are relatively high context: they interact within closely knit groups, they are sensitive to nonverbal cues, and they engage in relatively high amounts of body contact. French naturists were more likely than Germans to wear make-up and jewelry and to touch others as they would while dressed.

=== Private nudity ===
In the early 20th century, the attitudes of the general public toward the human body reflected rising consumerism, concerns regarding health and fitness, and changes in clothing fashions that sexualized the body. However, members of English families report that in the 1920s to 1940s they never saw other family members undressed, including those of the same gender. Modesty continued to prevail between married couples, even during sex. In the United States, a third of women born before 1900 remained clothed during sex, while it was only eight percent for those born in the 1920s.

Individuals vary in their comfort with being nude in private. According to a 2004 U.S. survey by ABC News, 31 percent of men and 14 percent of women report sleeping in the nude. In a 2014 survey in the U.K., 42 percent responded that they felt comfortable naked and 50 percent responded they did not. In that same survey, 22 percent said they often walk around the house naked, 29 percent slept in the nude, and 27 percent had gone swimming nude. In a 2018 U.S. survey by USA Today, 58 percent reported that they slept in the nude; by generation 65 percent of millennials, and 39 percent of baby boomers.

==== Body image and emotions ====
Body image is the perceptions and feelings of a person regarding their own body's appearance, which effects self-esteem and life satisfaction. There is evidence that the majority of women and girls in western societies have a negative body image, mainly regarding their size and weight. The sociocultural model of body image emphasizes the role of cultural ideals in the formation of an individual's body image. American ideals for women are unrealistic based upon a comparison of a healthy body mass index (BMI) with the desired BMI, which is 15 percent lower. Cultural ideals are transmitted by parents, peers, and the media. Men and boys are increasingly concerned with their appearance, wanting to be more muscular.

In non-western cultures, body image has a different meaning, particularly in sociocentric societies in which people think of themselves as part of a group, not as individuals. In addition, where food insecurity and disease is a danger, a person growing thinner is viewed as unhealthy; a more robust body is the ideal. The evolutionary perspective is that for women, hip-to-waist ratio with emphasis on the hips and a more curvaceous body is the ideal around the world, while for men it is waist-to-chest ratio. However, westernization of cultures has resulted in an increase in body dissatisfaction worldwide.

Shame is one of the moral emotions often associated with nudity. Shame may be thought of as positive in response to a failure to act in accordance with moral values, thus motivating improvement in the future. However, shame is often negative as the response to perceived failures to live up to unrealistic expectations. The shame regarding nudity is one of the exemplars of the emotion, yet rather than being a positive motivator, it is considered unhealthy. The universality of bodily shame is not supported by anthropological studies, which do not find the use of clothing to cover the genital areas in all societies, but often find the use of adornments to call attention to the sexuality.

Others argue that the shame felt when naked in public is due to valuing modesty and privacy as socially positive. However, the response to public exposure of normally private behavior is embarrassment, rather than shame. The absence of shame, or any other negative emotions regarding being naked, depends upon becoming unselfconscious while nude, which is the state both of children and those that practice naturism. This state is more difficult for women given the social presumption that women's bodies are always being observed and judged not only by men but other women. In a naturist environment, because everyone is naked, it becomes possible to dilute the power of social judgements.

Naturists have long promoted the benefits of social nudity, but little research had been done, reflecting the generally negative assumptions surrounding public nudity. Recent studies indicate not only that social nudity promotes a positive body image, but that nudity-based interventions are helpful for those with a negative body image. A negative body image affects overall self-esteem, which in turn reduces life satisfaction. Psychologist Keon West of Goldsmiths, University of London found that nude social interaction reduced body anxiety and promoted well-being.

=== Semi-public nudity ===
Historically, certain facilities associated with activities that require partial or complete nakedness, such as bathing or changing clothes, have limited access to certain members of the public. These normal activities are guided by generally accepted norms, the first of which is that the facilities are most often segregated by gender; however, this may not be the case in all cultures. Discomfort with nudity has two components, not wanting to see others naked, and not wanting to be seen by others while naked.

In Islamic countries, women may not use public baths, and men must wear a waist wrapper. In some traditional cultures and rural areas modern practices are limited by the belief that only the exposed parts of the body (hands, feet, face) need to be washed daily; and also by Christian and Muslim belief that the naked body is shameful and must always be covered.

==== Steam baths and spas ====
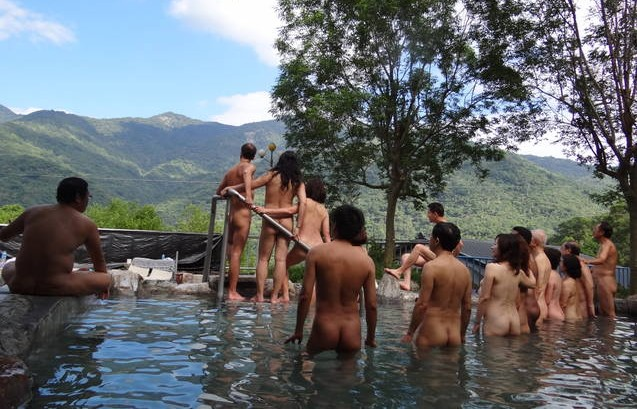
Outdoor bathing at Zhiben Hot Spring, Taiwan 2012

Many cultures have a tradition going back to prehistory of communal use of hot water or steam/sweat baths which are usually nude, sometimes with mixed genders. (Note: German text: "Dass Männer und Frauen zusammen splitternackt schwitzen, ist eine deutsche Spezialität, für die sich nur noch Urlauber aus den Benelux-Staaten, aus Österreich und der Schweiz erwärmen können, vielleicht auch noch Osteuropäer". English translation: "The fact that men and women sweat together stark naked is a German specialty that only tourists from the Benelux countries, Austria and Switzerland can warm to, maybe even Eastern Europeans".)

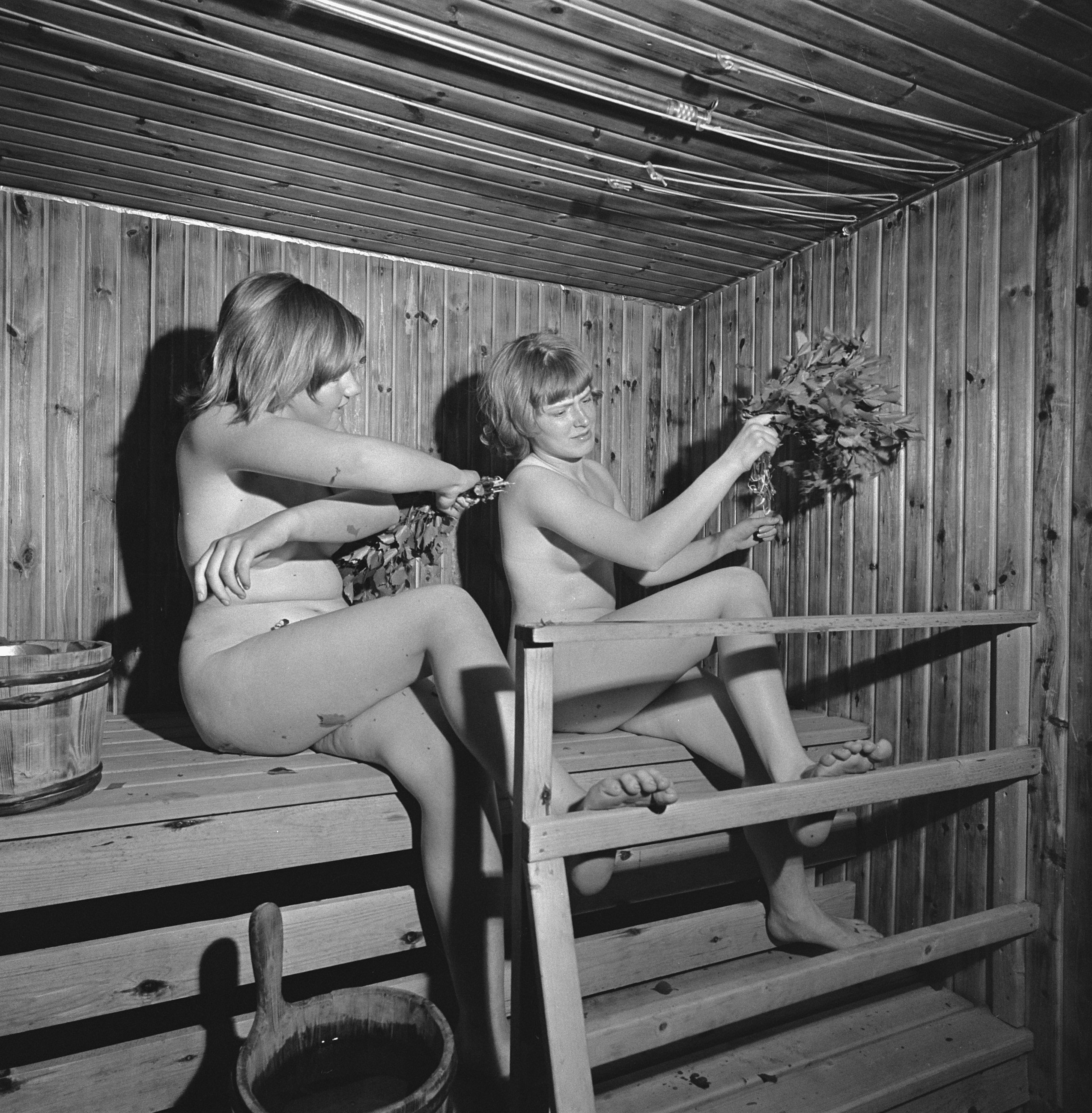
Using birch branches in a Finnish sauna, 1967

The sauna is attended nude in its source country of Finland, where many families have one in their home, and is one of the defining characteristics of Finnish identity. For Finns, going to a sauna is a ritual with cultural meanings regarding cleanliness, connections to nature, and connection to other people without public roles or sexuality. Saunas have been adopted worldwide, first in Scandinavian and German-speaking countries of Europe, with the trend in some of these being to allow both genders to bathe together nude. For example, the Friedrichsbad in Baden-Baden has designated times when mixed nude bathing is permitted. The German sauna culture also became popular in neighbouring countries such as Switzerland, Belgium, the Netherlands and Luxembourg. In contrast to Scandinavia, public sauna facilities in these countries—while nude—do not usually segregate genders. (Note: German text: "In den Fitnesszentren und Kuranstalten wurde das finnische Bad, oft großzügig ausgestaltet zu ganzen Saunalandschaften, zum selbstverständlichen Angebot. Bemerkenswert ist, dass dort heute zumeist auf getrennte Badezeiten für Männer und Frauen verzichtet wird. Nacktheit von Mann und Frau in der Sauna wird hier längst akzeptiert und das hat ein positives soziales Gesamtklima erzeugt, das selbstregulierend – die seltenen Ausnahmen bestätigen die Regel – das Verhalten der Badegäste bestimmt. Verpönt ist […] der Versuch, sich in Badekleidung […] unter die Nackten zu mischen". English translation: "In the fitness centers and health resorts, the Finnish bath, often designed generously to complete sauna landscapes, was a natural offer. It is noteworthy that today there is usually no separate bathing times for men and women. Nakedness of men and women in the sauna has been accepted for a long time and that has created a positive overall social climate. Self-regulation – the rare exceptions confirm the rule – determines the behavior of the bathers. Trying to mingle with naked bathers while dressed […] is frowned upon".)

The sauna came to the United States in the 19th century when Finns settled in western territories, building family saunas on their farms. When community saunas were built in the 20th century, they eventually included separate steam rooms for men and women.

Korean spas have opened in the United States, also gender separated in areas with nudity. In addition to the health benefits, a woman wrote in Psychology Today suggesting the social benefits for women and girls having real life experience of seeing the variety of real female bodies—even more naked than at a beach—as a counterbalance to the unrealistic nudity seen in popular media.

==== Changing rooms and showers ====
The men's locker room—which in Western cultures had been a setting for open male social nudity—is, in the 21st century United States, becoming a space of modesty and distancing between men. For much of the 20th century, the norm in locker rooms had been for men to undress completely without embarrassment. That norm has changed; in the 21st century, men typically wear towels or other garments in the locker room most of the time and avoid any interaction with others while naked. This shift is the result of changes in social norms regarding masculinity and how maleness is publicly expressed; also, open male nudity has become associated with homosexuality. In facilities such as the YMCA that cater to multiple generations, the young are uncomfortable sharing space with older people who do not cover up. The behavior in women's locker rooms and showers also indicates a generational change, younger women covering more, and full nudity being brief and rare, while older women are more open and casual.

In the 21st century, some high-end New York City gyms were redesigned to cater to millennials who want to shower without ever being seen naked. The trend for privacy is being extended to public schools, colleges and community facilities replacing "gang showers" and open locker rooms with individual stalls and changing rooms. The change also addresses issues of transgender usage and family use when one parent accompanies children of differing gender.

==== Arts-related activities ====
Distinct from the nude artworks created, sessions where artists work from live models are a social situation where nudity has a long tradition. The role of the model both as part of visual art education and in the creation of finished works has evolved since antiquity in Western societies and worldwide wherever western cultural practices in the visual arts have been adopted. At modern universities, art schools, and community groups art model is a job, one requirement of which is to pose "undraped". Some have investigated the benefits of arts education including drawing nudes from life as an opportunity to satisfy youthful curiosity regarding the human body in a non-sexual context.

=== Public nudity ===
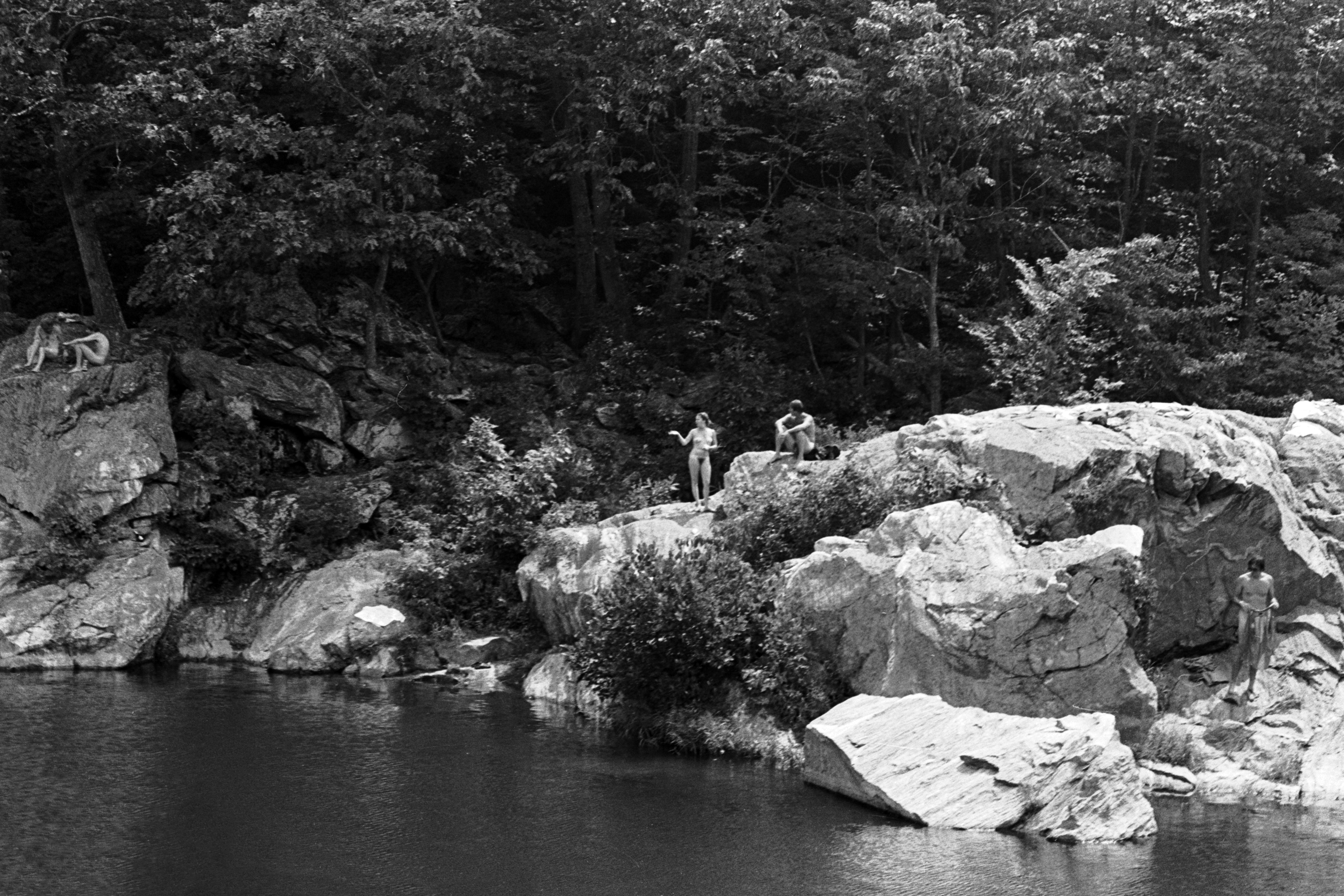
Five nude people on the rocks around Black Pond, McLean, Virginia in July 1980

Participants in the counterculture of the 1960s embraced nudity as part of their daily routine and to emphasize their rejection of anything artificial. Countercultural nudity differed from classical nudism by agreeing that nudity is natural and fun but may also be sexual while rejecting the sexual exploitation of women. It also became an expression of dissent in opposition to hostility and violence, hippies finding that nudity interfered with the usual procedures of civil authority.

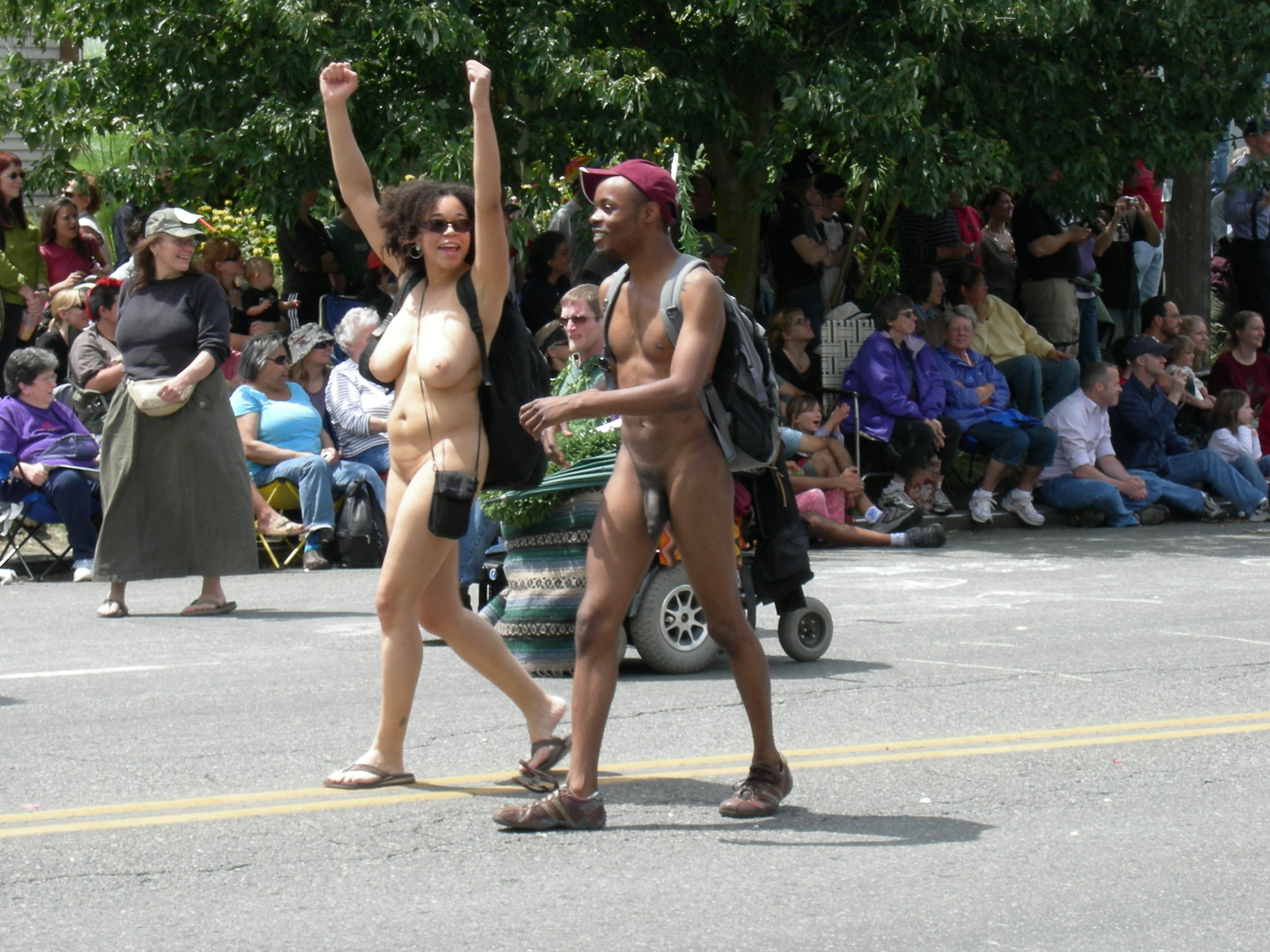
Nude people at the 2007 Fremont Solstice Parade in Seattle, Washington

In the mainstream, Diana Vreeland could note in Vogue in 1970 that a bikini bottom worn alone had become fashionable for young women on beaches from Saint-Tropez, France to Sardinia, Italy. In 1974, an article in The New York Times noted an increase in American tolerance for nudity, both at home and in public, approaching that of Europe. By 1998, American attitudes toward sexuality had continued to become more liberal than in prior decades, but the reaction to total nudity in public was generally negative. However, some elements of the counterculture, including nudity, continued with events such as Burning Man.

Attitudes toward public nudity vary from complete prohibition in Islamic countries to general acceptance, particularly in Scandinavia and Germany, of nudity for recreation and at special events. Such special events can be understood by expanding the historical concept of Carnival, where otherwise transgressive behaviors are allowed on particular occasions to include public nudity. Examples include the Solstice Swim in Tasmania (part of the Dark Mofo festival) and World Naked Bike Rides.

Germany is known for being tolerant of public nudity in many situations. In a 2014 survey, 28 percent of Austrians and Germans had sunbathed nude on a beach, 18 percent of Norwegians, 17 percent of Spaniards and Australians, 16 percent of New Zealanders. Of the nationalities surveyed, the Japanese had the lowest percentage, 2 percent.

In the United States in 2012, the city council of San Francisco, California, banned public nudity in the inner-city area. This move was initially resisted because the city was known for its liberal culture and had previously tolerated public nudity. Similarly, park rangers began issuing tickets against nudity at San Onofre State Beach—also a place with long tradition of public nudity—in 2010.

==== Naturism ====
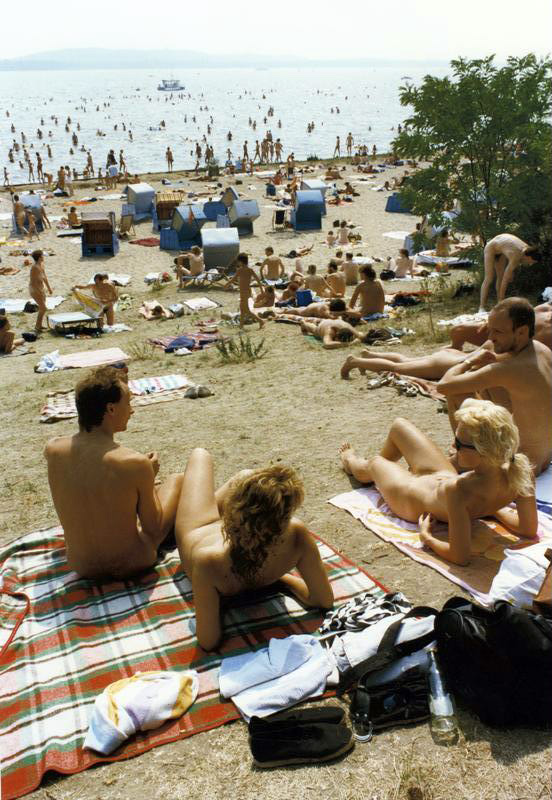
Sunbathers at Müggelsee lake beach in East Berlin, 1989.

Nudism, in German Freikörperkultur (FKK), "free body culture" originated in Europe in the late 19th century among some members of the life reform movement (Lebensreform) who sought a simpler life in opposition to industrialization. While Christian moralists in the early 20th century tended to condemn nudism, some Christians found moral purity in the nude body compared to the sexually suggestive clothing of the era. Its proponents believed that nudism could combat social inequality, including sexual inequality. Naturist attitudes toward the body became more widely accepted in sports and in the arts in the Weimar Republic. There were advocates of the health benefits of sun and fresh air that instituted programs of exercise in the nude for children in groups of mixed gender, Adolf Koch founding thirteen FKK schools. With the rise of Nazism in the 1930s, the nudism movement split ideologically, the socialists adopting the views of Koch, seeing his programs as part of improving the lives of the working class. Although many Nazis opposed nudity, others used it to extol the Aryan race as the standard of beauty, as reflected in the Nazi propaganda film Olympia directed by Leni Riefenstahl. Between the first and second world wars, naturism spread to other countries based upon the German model, but being less ideological and political; incorporating cultural elements within Scandinavia, France, England, Belgium and the Netherlands.

Contemporary naturism (or nudism) is a subculture advocating and defending private and public nudity as part of a simple, natural lifestyle. Naturists reject contemporary standards of modesty that discourage personal, family and social nudity. They instead seek to create a social environment where individuals feel comfortable being in the company of nude people and being seen nude, either by other naturists or by the general public. In contradiction of the popular belief that nudists are more sexually permissive, research finds that nudist and non-nudists do not differ in their sexual behavior. The young children with experiences of naturism or nudity in the home had a more positive body image.

The social sciences, until the middle of the 20th century, often studied public nakedness, including naturism, in the context of deviance or criminality. However, more recent studies find that naturism has positive effects on body image, self-esteem and life satisfaction.

== Legal issues ==
Worldwide, public nudity may be allowed or prohibited based upon local laws or customs that range from lenient to strict.

In the United Kingdom, nudity may not be used to "harass, alarm or distress" according to the Public Order Act 1986. Simply being nude would not likely fall under any category of offense. After repeated arrests, prosecutions, and convictions in Great Britain, the activist Stephen Gough sued at the European Court of Human Rights for the right to be nude in public outside of designated areas. His claim was ultimately rejected.

In the 21st century in the United States, the legal definition of "full nudity" is exposure of the genitals. "Partial nudity" includes exposure of the buttocks by either sex or exposure of the female breasts. Legal definitions are further complicated by laws regarding indecent exposure; this term generally refers to engaging in public nudity with an intent to offend common decency. Lewd and indecent behavior is usually defined as causing alarm, discomfort, or annoyance for the average person. Where the law has been challenged by asserting that nudity by itself in not lewd or disorderly, laws have been amended to specify indecent exposure, usually of the genitals but not always of the breast. Public indecency is generally a misdemeanor, but may become a felony upon repeated offense or always if done in the presence of a minor. The law differs between states. In Oregon, public nudity is legal and protected as free speech as long as there is not an "intent to arouse". Arkansas not only outlaws private nudism, but bans anyone from advocating the practice.

Specific laws may either require or prohibit religious attire (veiling) for women. In a survey using data from 2012 to 2013, there were 11 majority Muslim countries where women must cover their entire bodies in public, which may include the face. There were 39 countries, mostly in Europe, that had some prohibition of religious attire, in particular face coverings in certain situations, such as government buildings. Within Russia, laws may either require or prohibit veiling depending upon location.

The brief, sudden exposure of parts of the body normally hidden from public view has a long tradition, taking several forms:

- Flashing refers to the brief public exposure of the genitals or female breasts. At Mardi Gras in New Orleans flashing—an activity that would be prohibited at any other time and place—has become a ritual of long standing in celebration of Carnival. While many celebrations of Carnival worldwide include minimal costumes, in the French Quarter flashing references its history as a "red-light district", a sexual performance earning a symbolic payment of glass beads. Although the majority of those performing continue to be women, men (both homosexual and heterosexual) now also participate.
- Mooning refers to exposure of the buttocks. Mooning opponents in sports or in battle as an insult may have a history going back to ancient Rome.
- Streaking refers to running nude through a public area. While the activity may have a long history, the term originated in the 1970s for a fad on college campuses, which was initially widespread but short-lived. Later, a tradition of "nude runs" became institutionalized on certain campuses, such as the Primal Scream at Harvard.

=== Imposed nudity ===
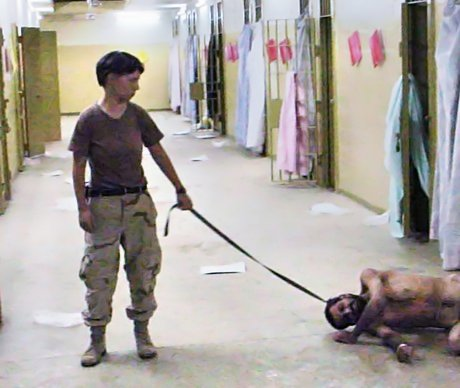
One of the photographs of the Abu Ghraib prison torture scandal: a naked prisoner being forced to crawl and bark like a dog on a leash.

==== Punishment ====
In some situations, nudity is forced on a person. For instance, imposed nudity (full or partial) can be part of corporal punishment or as humiliation, especially when administered in public. For example, in 2017, students at a girls' school in the north-east Indian state of Arunachal Pradesh were forced to undress as a form of punishment.

==== Torture ====
Nazis used forced nudity to humiliate inmates in concentration camps. This practice was depicted in the film Schindler's List (1993).

In 2003, Abu Ghraib prison in Baghdad, Iraq gained international notoriety for accounts of torture and abuses by members of the United States Army Reserve during the post-invasion period. Photographic images were circulated that showed the posing of prisoners naked, sometimes bound, and being intimidated and otherwise humiliated, resulting in widespread condemnation of the abuse.

==== Strip search ====
A strip search is the removal of some or all of a person's clothing to ensure that they do not have weapons or contraband. Such searches are generally done when an individual is imprisoned after an arrest, and is justified by the need to maintain order in the facility, not as punishment for a crime.

=== Nudity as protest ===
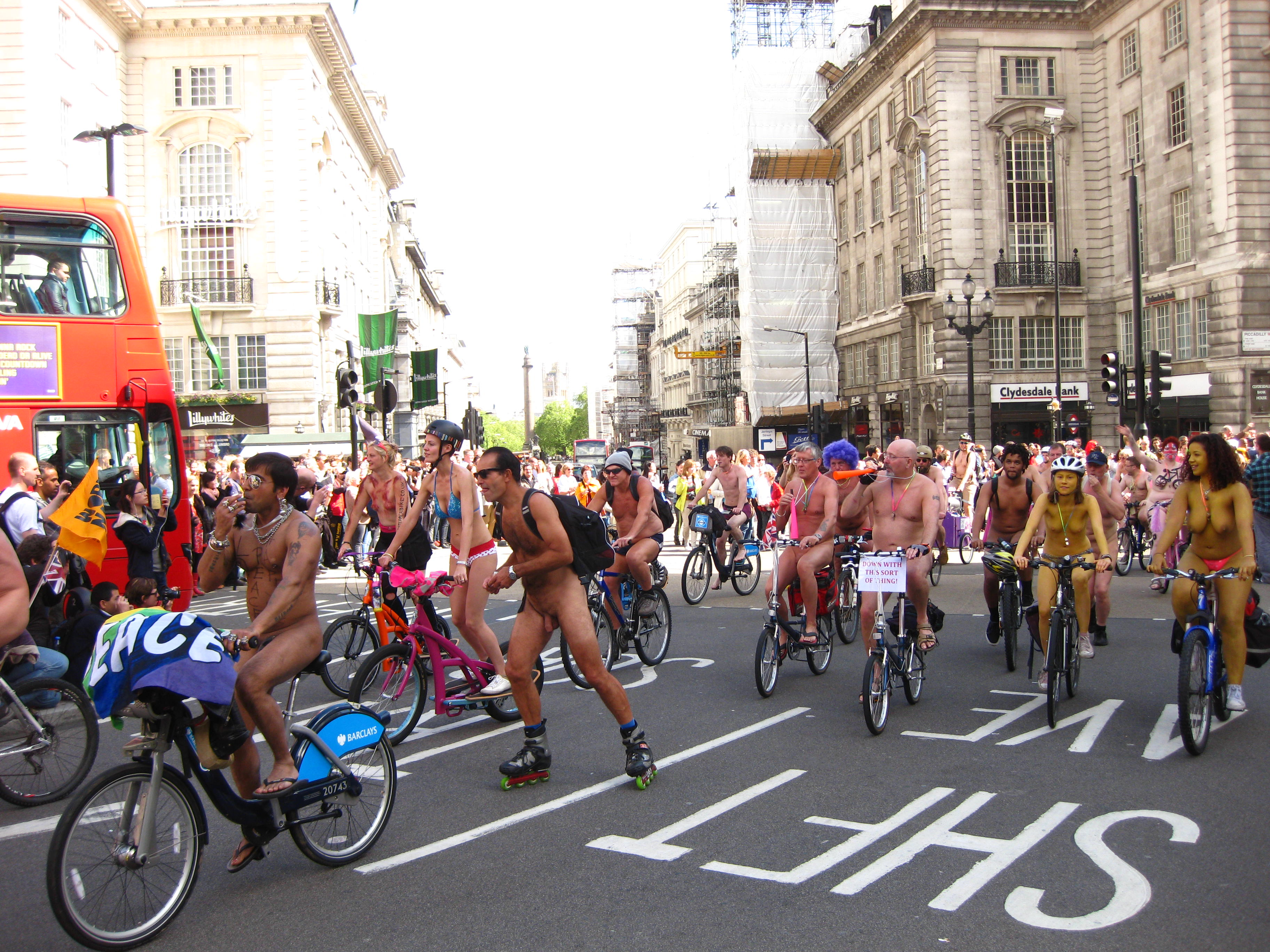
People taking part in the World Naked Bike Ride in London, 2012

Nudity is used to draw public attention to a cause, sometimes including the promotion of public nudity itself. People for the Ethical Treatment of Animals (PETA) used nudity to protest the use of animal fur in fashion. In Africa from the colonial to the contemporary eras, women have used nudity to confront economic and political injustices. Although similar in behavior, each incident may have different roots in the beliefs regarding female power within each society, in particular between West Africa and Southern Africa.

== Depictions and performance ==
Depictions of the human body, both dressed and undressed, continually reaffirm what each society defines as natural in human appearance, which is part of socialization. The pictorial conventions used in visual culture provide the contexts that make images comprehensible. In Western societies, the contexts for depictions of nudity include information (such as nudes in National Geographic), art (images displayed for aesthetic appreciation) and pornography (images that are primarily sexual). Any ambiguous image not easily fitting into one of these categories may be misinterpreted, leading to disputes. Disputes may be resolved by the invention of a new context, such as erotic art, which combines aesthetic qualities with explicit sexuality. However, more conservative groups may continue to see any sexual depictions as pornographic. Another recent development is the commodified nude used in advertising and promotion. The nude in photography includes scientific, commercial, fine art, and erotic photography.

Making a distinction between art and pornography, Kenneth Clark stated "no nude, however abstract, should fail to arouse in the spectator some vestige of erotic feeling, even though it be only the faintest shadow—and if it does not do so it is bad art and false morals". As an example, Clark referred to the temple sculptures of tenth-century India as "great works of art because their eroticism is part of their whole philosophy". Great art can contain significant sexual content without being obscene.

China has never had a tradition of depicting the nude except in pornography. In 1925, nude models were banned from Chinese art schools. In Islam, any depictions of the body or sexuality, including photography and film, are forbidden as they would be in life.

The naked human body was one of the first subjects of prehistoric art, including the numerous female figurines found throughout Europe, the earliest now dating from 40,000 years ago. The meaning of these objects cannot be determined, however the exaggeration of breasts, bellies, and buttocks indicate more symbolic than realistic interpretations. Alternatives include symbolism of fertility, abundance, or overt sexuality in the context of beliefs in supernatural forces. Surviving examples of ancient art indicate that the modern concept of pornography did not exist before Christianity, with many examples not only of nudity but sexual activity.

Depictions of child nudity (or of children with nude adults) appear in works of art in various cultures and historical periods. Attitudes have changed over time and such images have become increasingly controversial, especially in the case of photography. Once commonplace, snapshots taken by parents of their nude infant or preschool children became suspect during the last decades of the 20th century. When film was developed by commercial photo labs, some were reported to the police as possible child pornography. While some individuals suffered legal actions, no charges involving mere nudity have been ultimately upheld, because the legal definition of child pornography is that it depicts sexually explicit conduct.

Live performances, such as dance, theater, and performance art may include nudity either for realism or symbolic meaning. Nudity on stage has become generally accepted in Western cultures beginning in the 20th century. In Islamic countries any erotic or sexually exciting performances, such as dancing, are forbidden. (Note: An exception is Raqs sharqi, a form of belly dance which continues to be performed in Egypt.) Contemporary choreographers consider nudity one of the possible "costumes" available for dance, some seeing nudity as expressing deeper human qualities through dance which works against the sexual objectification of the body in commercial culture.

In the United States, nudity in live performance is a matter of local laws except for First Amendment protection of free expression, which is generally recognized with regard to performances in an artistic context. In other contexts, nudity may be limited by local laws; a 1991 US Supreme Court decision, Barnes v. Glen Theatre, Inc., upheld an Indiana law prohibiting total nudity for dancers in a bar.

Depictions of nudity
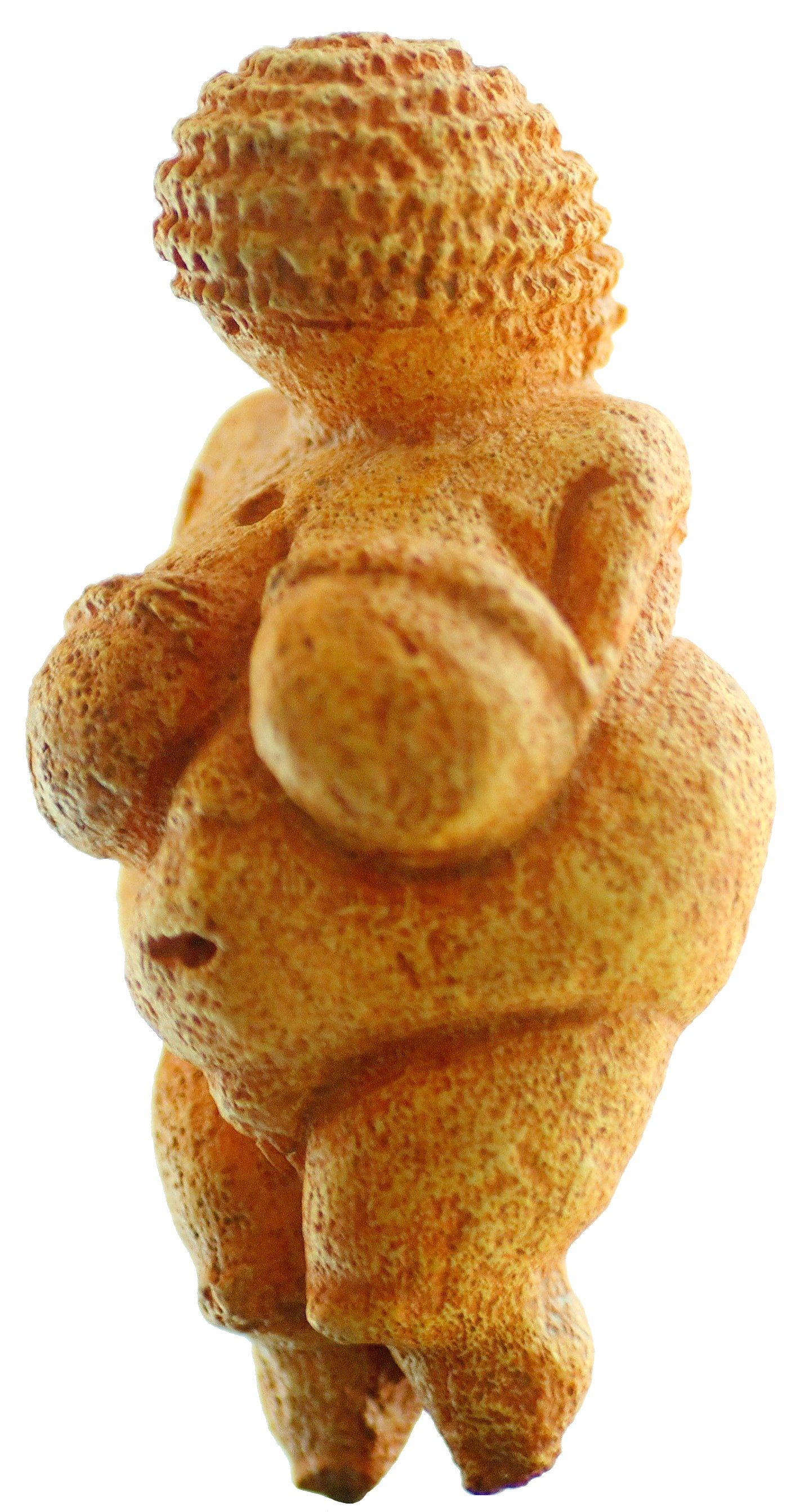
The Venus of Willendorf made between 24,000 and 22,000 BCE.

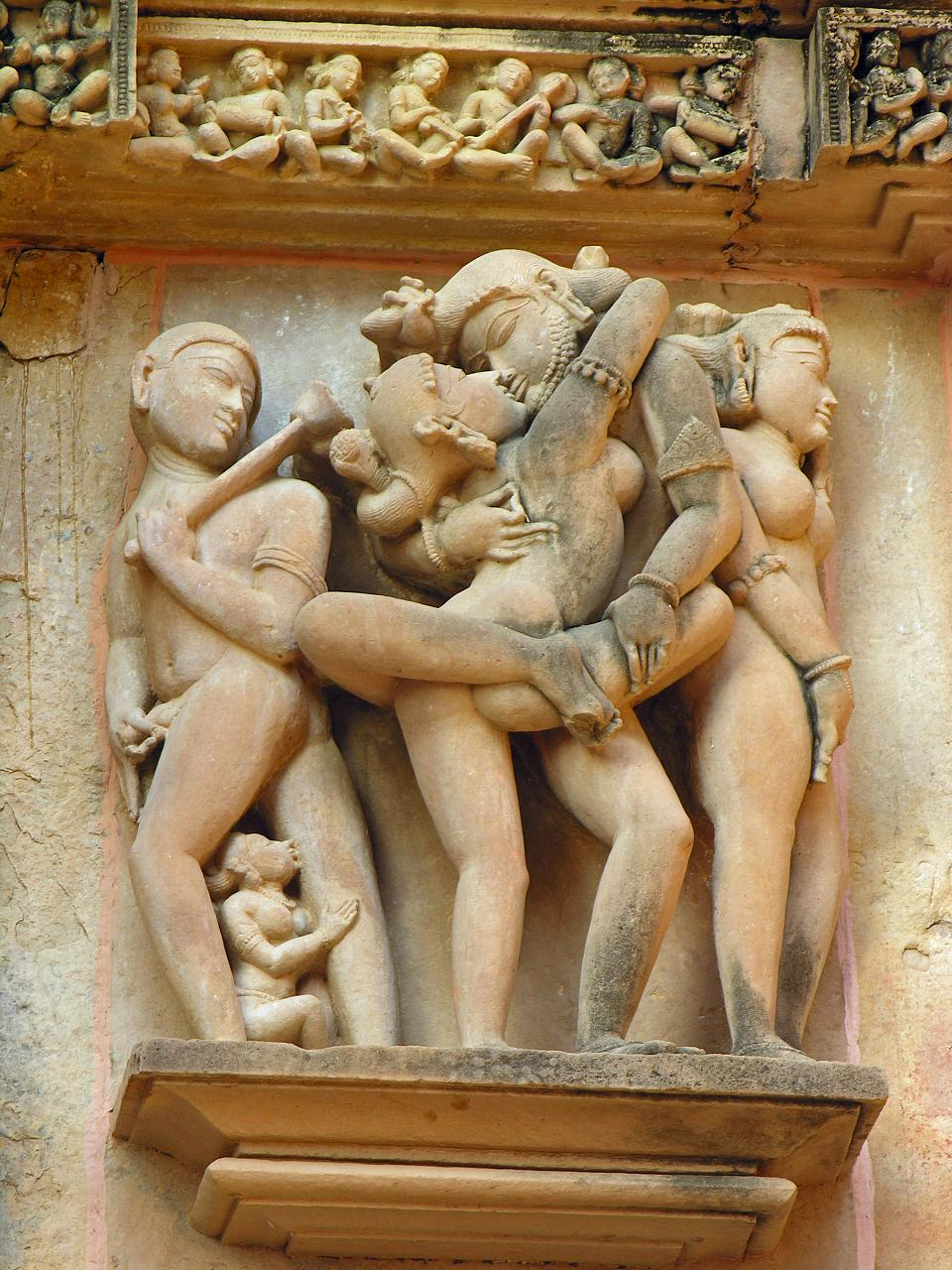
Sculpture from Vishvanatha Temple, Khajuraho, Madhya Pradesh, India (c. 1050 CE)

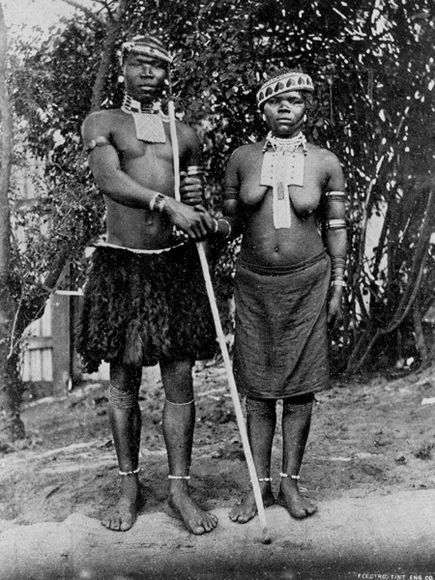
Zulu Bride and Bridegroom, the first photograph in National Geographic of a woman with bare breasts (1896)

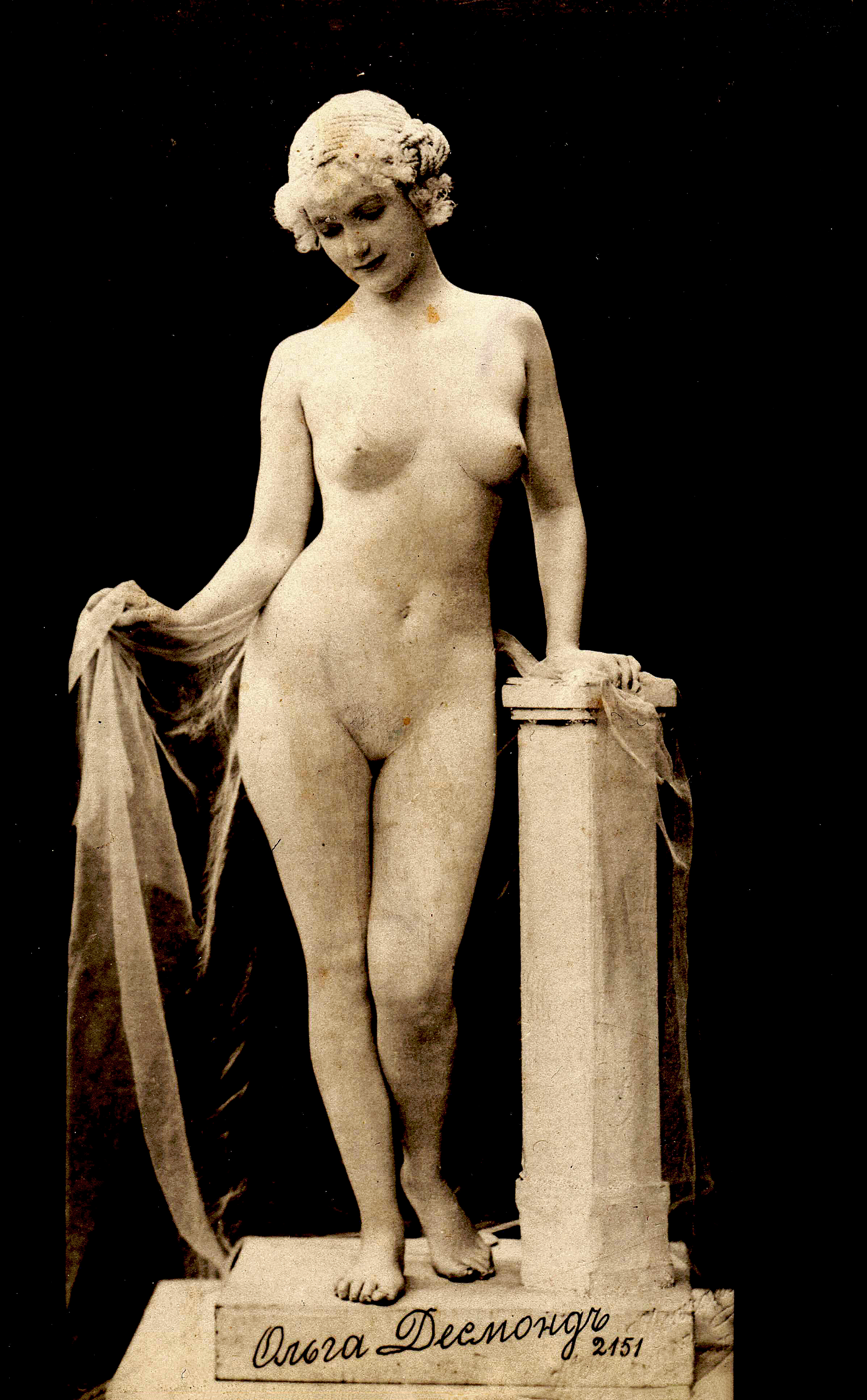
Tableau Vivant by Olga Desmond (c. 1908): Performers posing motionless on stage placed nudity in an artistic context

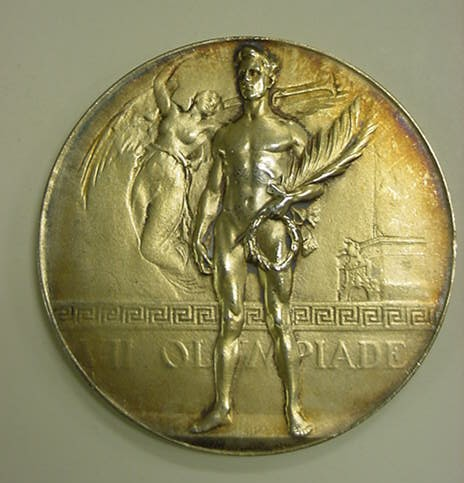
Medal for the 1920 Olympic Games references the nudity of athletes in the ancient Olympics

Images of a man and woman on the Pioneer plaque (1971) as part of a message to extraterrestrials

== See also ==
- Human body
- Human skin – Organ covering the outside of the human body
- Modesty – Dress or behavior to avoid sexual attraction
- Nude recreation – Leisure activity while naked
  - List of places where social nudity is practised
  - List of social nudity organizations
- Nudity in combat – Fictional and actual practice of wearing little or no clothing in battle
- History of the nude in art
