= Xingu peoples =

Group of Indigenous peoples of Brazil

Xingu people
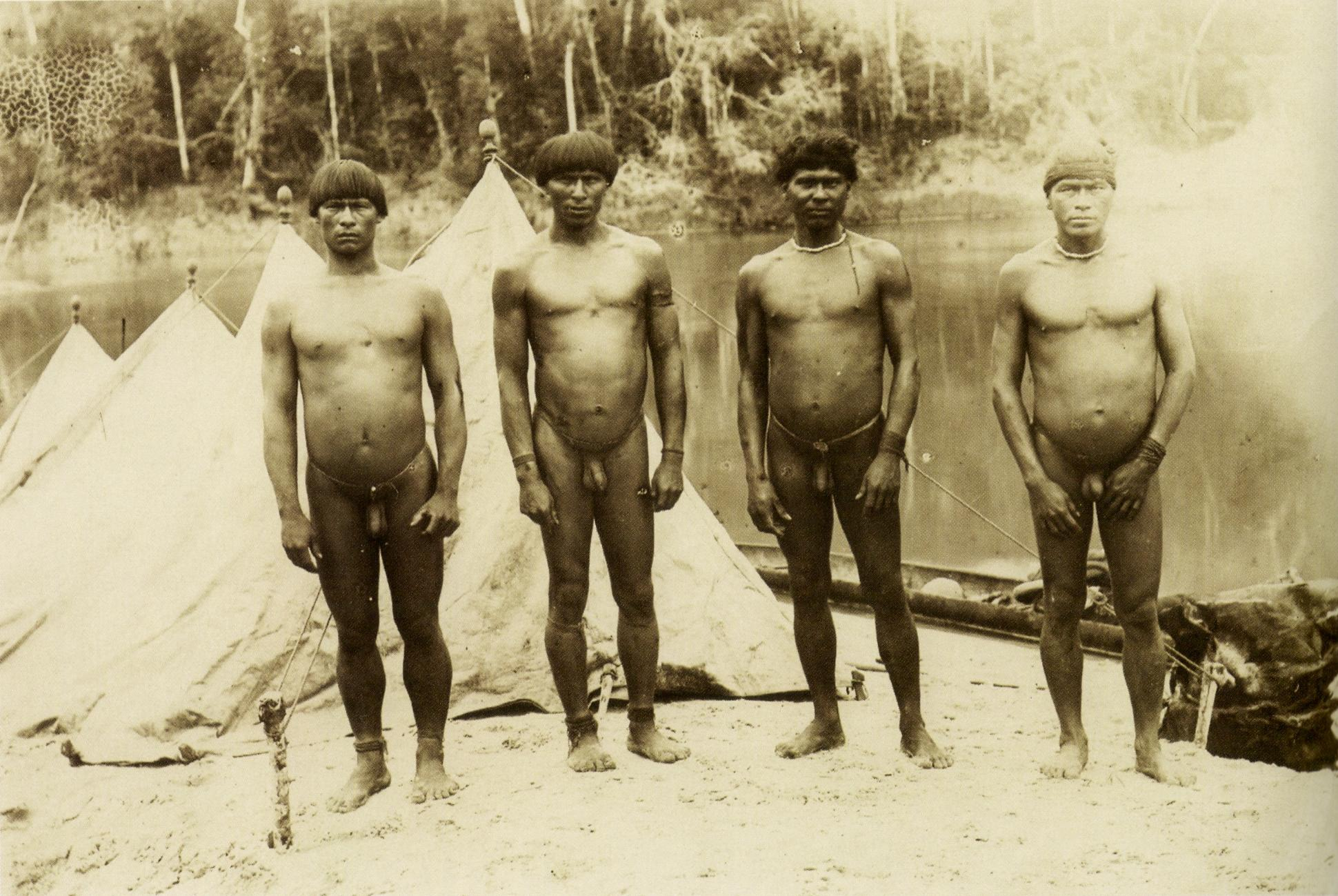
- Mehinako people, c. 1894

Total population
- 3,000

Related ethnic groups
- Aweti; Kalapalo; Kamaiurá; Kayapó; Kuikuro; Matipu; Mehinako; Nahukuá; Suyá; Trumai; Waura; Yawalapiti

The Xingu are a cultural group of Indigenous peoples of Brazil living near the Xingu River. They include the Aweti, Kalapalo, Kamaiurá, Kayapó, Kuikuro, Matipu, Mehinako, Nahukuá, Suyá, Trumai, Wauja and the Yawalapiti peoples. They have many cultural similarities despite their different ethnicity and language groups. Xingu people represent fifteen tribes and all four of Brazil's major Indigenous language groups, but they share similar belief systems, rituals and ceremonies.

== Precolumbian history ==
The Upper Xingu region was heavily populated prior to European and African contact. Densely populated settlements developed from 1200 to 1600 CE. Ancient roads and bridges linked communities that were often surrounded by ditches or moats. The villages were pre-planned and featured circular plazas. Archaeologists have unearthed 19 villages so far.

== Post-contact history ==
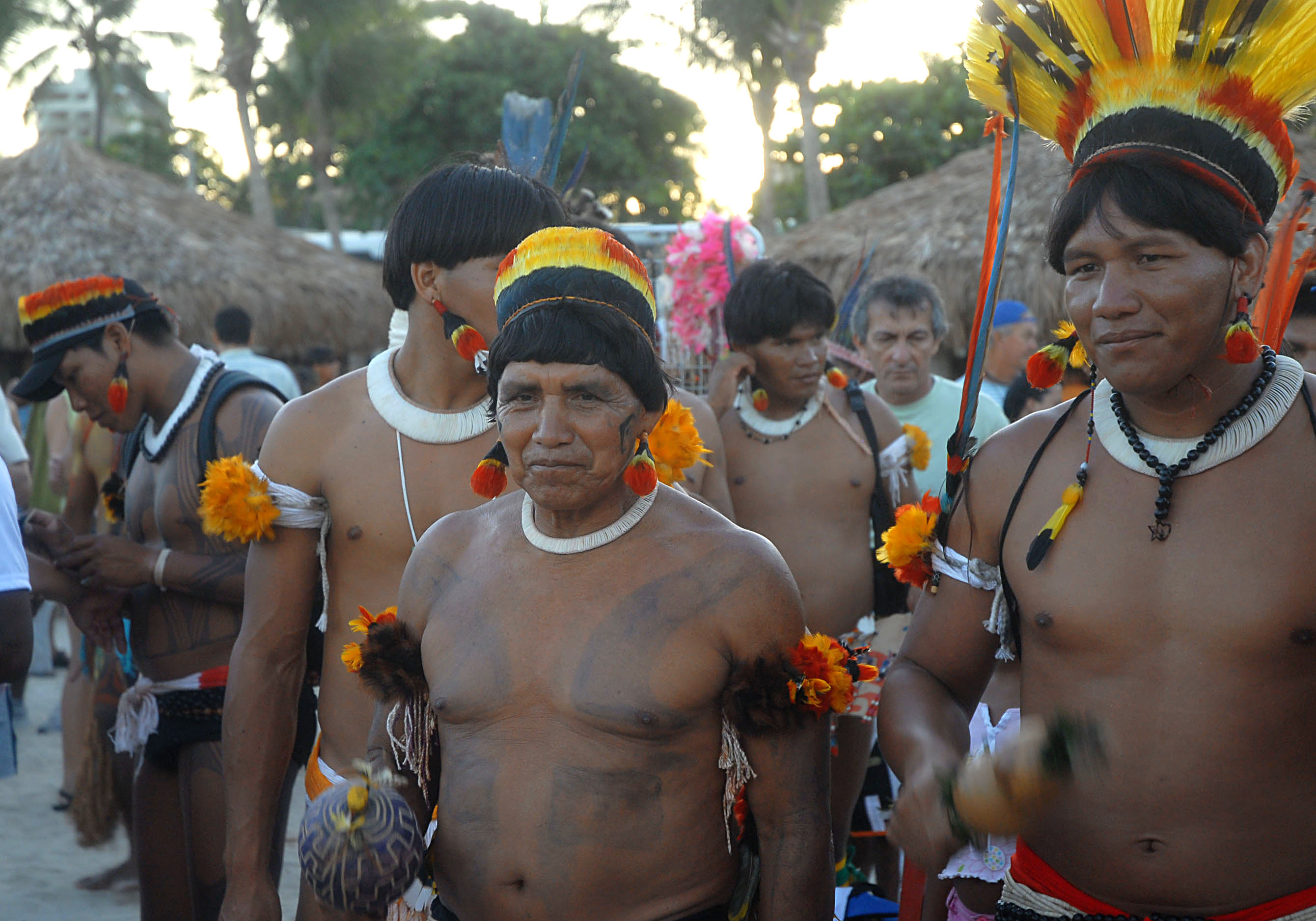
Kuikuro from Mato Grosso

Kuikuro oral history says Portuguese slavers arrived in the Xingu region around 1750. Xinuguano population was estimated in the tens of thousands but was dramatically reduced by diseases and slavery by the Portuguese. In the centuries since the penetration of the Europeans into South America, the Xingu fled from different regions to avoid the spread of deadly disease and enslavement by the Portuguese. By the end of the 19th century, about 3,000 natives lived at the Alto Xingu, where their current political status has kept them protected against foreign intruders. By the mid-twentieth century this number had been reduced by foreign epidemic diseases such as flu, measles, smallpox and malaria to less than 1,000. Only an estimated 500 Xingu peoples were alive in the 1950s.

The Brazilian Villas-Bôas brothers visited the area beginning in 1946, and pushed for the creation of the Parque Indígena do Xingu, eventually established in 1961. Their story is told in a film, Xingu. The number of Xingu living there in 32 settlements has risen again to over 3000 inhabitants, half of them younger than 15 years.

The Xingu living in this region have similar habits and social systems, despite different languages. Specifically, they consist of the following peoples: the Aweti, Kalapalo, Kamaiurá, Kayapó, Kuikuro, Matipu, Mehinako, Nahukuá, Suyá, Trumai, Wauja and Yawalapiti.

== Intertribal relations ==
The different tribes comprising the Xingu have not been reported to battle each other in war. The Xingu have been described by ethnographers as a "peaceful" society. The only violence seen between the groups are murdering for witchcraft and wrestling matches that take place either between people of the same tribe or between people of different tribes as a means of letting people release the anger they have towards one another, and defending themselves from invasions from other tribes. The Xingu classify people into three different categories that they believe exist because the Sun gave people different personal traits; these categories are the Xingu people, the other indigenous people, and the white people. In a Wauja myth, the Xingu are seen as peaceful whereas these other two groups are seen as violent. The Xingu people maintain peace within their own tribes through trade, intermarriage, and ceremonies.

=== Trade ===
Tribes specialize in specific items, such as pottery (Wauja tribe), wooden bowls (Kamayurá tribes), accessories (Kalapalo and Kuikuru tribes) and decorations (Yawalapití tribe) made from shells, and salt (Trumaí and Mehinaku tribes).

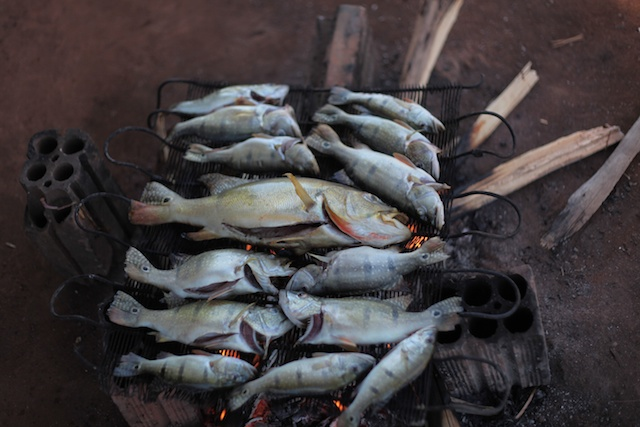
Fish preparation in a Xingu community.

=== Intermarriage ===
For the Kuikuru and Mehinaku tribes, the percentages of marriages that occur between members of these tribes and other tribes are 30% and 35% respectively. Members of the Yawalapití tribe try to marry people from the Kamayurá, Kuikuru, Kalapalo, and Mehinaku tribes.

=== Ceremonies, religious practices, and community ===
One religious practice that the Xingu engage in involves fishing, as many people within the Xingu communities depend on eating fish to provide them with protein. Specifically, shamans expel smoke from herbs in an attempt to prevent the fishermen from being harmed by alligators. The community participates in the preparation of the fish, in which many fish are cooked on an open fire. Women prepare beiju, which are pancakes that are made of cassava.

All of the Xingu tribes attend ceremonies to inaugurate new tribal chiefs and honor deceased chiefs.

==== Kuarup and response to COVID-19 ====
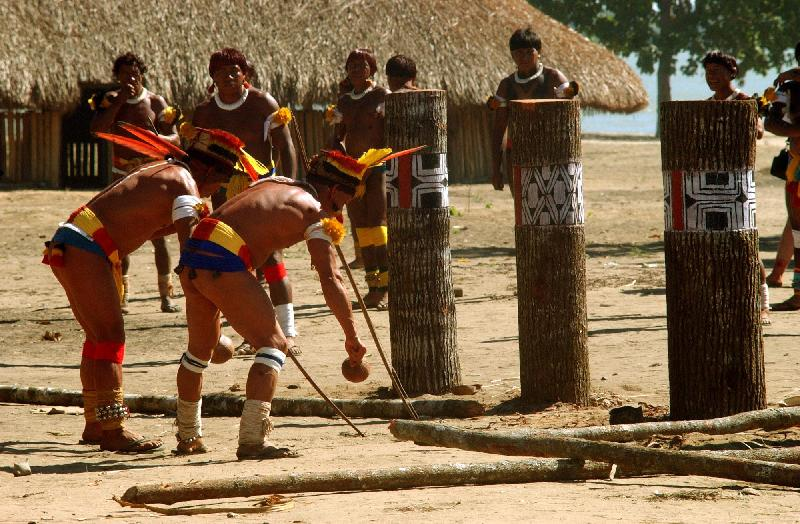
Quarup funeral ritual

Yawalapiti Chief Aritana and eleven other Xingu people died from the COVID-19 virus. Aritana died in August 2020 at the age of 71. The members of the Xingu community commemorated the victims of COVID-19 by putting four painted tree trunks at the center of the village. The spirits are believed to be contained within the tree trunks and are believed to move to the underworld to be with their ancestors. The death of Aritana and three Xingu elders caused women to cry for multiple days. To commemorate Aritana's death, the Xingu participated in a funeral ceremony called the Kuarup, where ritual dances and combat are performed to honor the cycle of life. The combat ritual consists of a competition in which warriors from various tribes perform a dance followed by a wrestling match. The Kuarup also consists of a feast. Men honored the life of Aritana by holding a parade where they blew bamboo trumpets and by painting their bodies black and red. The black paint came from fruit of the jenipapo tree and the red paint came from urucum seeds.

== Environmental changes ==
Xingu people have historically used fire as a landscaping tool. For centuries, they have understood and utilized the environment based on oral traditions. Xingu tribes from the twenty-first century are noticing changes in the level of fire in the rainforest as well as hotter temperatures, changing rain patterns, and higher river levels. For generations, the Xingu and other tribes in the South American lowlands have been using the emergence of the Pleiades to predict the start of the rainy season, but now this method is not able to be used as consistently. Evidence of the rising river is seen in a meeting of Waurá elders about the year 2005, when turtles failed to hatch because the river rose at an earlier point in the year than what was observed in previous years.

== Activism and land ==
In May 2019, Xingu women held a women's conference with around 200 attendees on the Ilha Grande where they discussed issues concerning climate change, deforestation, concerns about President Jair Bolsonaro's treatment of indigenous peoples, and the distribution between gender, occupations, and leadership. In some families, the men carried out household tasks while the women participated in the conference.

Between July and August 2019, 147 square kilometers or 57.8 square miles of the Xingu's land was destroyed, which was a 172% increase from the July to August period in 2018. Factors that contribute to the loss of land include invasions, illegal activity, and forest fires. The recent changes in Xingu land have caused the loss of plants used in medicine.

In August 2019, Xingu women, led by Watatakalu Yawalapiti, joined the First Brazilian Indigenous Women's March in Brasilia. The purpose of the march was to promote the defense of indigenous lands and allow indigenous women to be seen in and participate in places outside of their tribes.
