= Trumai =

Trumai may refer to:

- Trumai people, an ethnic group of Brazil
- Trumai language, their language
