= Ordre national du Mérite =

Order of State with membership awarded by the President of the French Republic

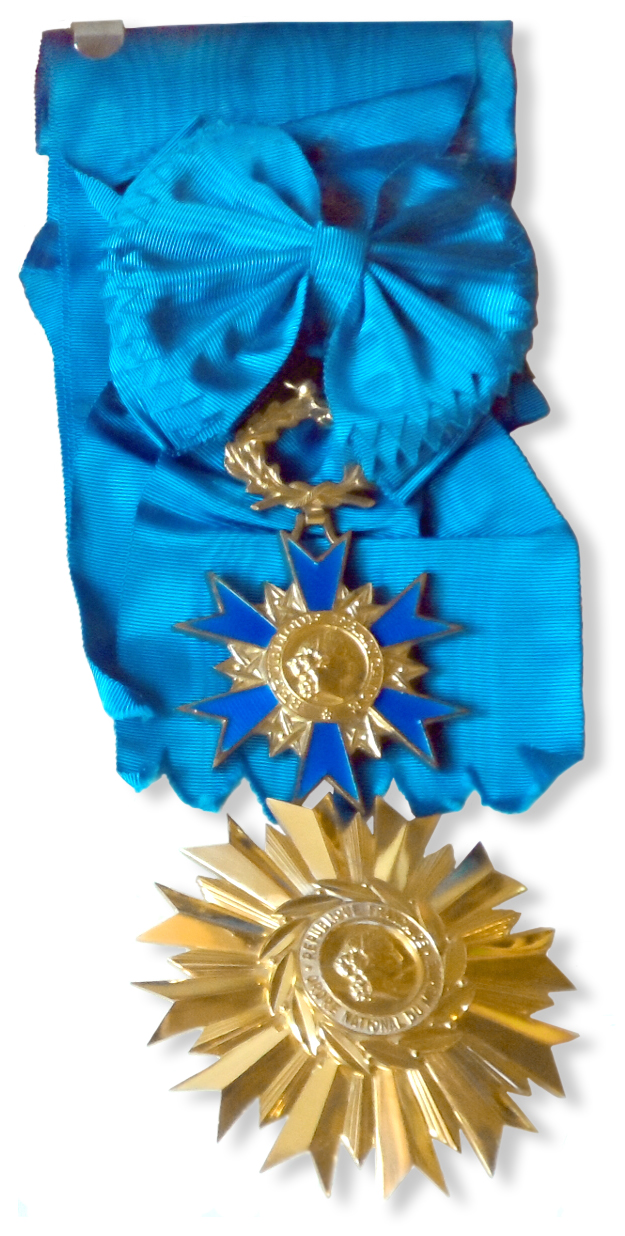
- Sash, badge and star of a Grand Cross

Awarded by the President of France
- Type: Order of merit
- Established: 3 December 1963
- Ribbon: Blue
- Awarded for: Distinguished civil or military achievements
- Status: Active
- Grand Master: President Emmanuel Macron
- Grades: Grand Cross; Grand Officer; Commander; Officer; Knight

Statistics
- First induction: 1963

Precedence
- Next (higher): Military Medal
- Next (lower): National Recognition Medal for Victims of Terrorism
- Related: Order of Agricultural Merit; Order of Maritime Merit
- Grand-croix Grand-officier Commandeur Officier Chevalier; Ribbon bars of the order

The Ordre national du Mérite (French: [ɔʁdʁ nɑsjɔnal dy meʁit]; English: National Order of Merit) is a French order of merit with membership awarded by the President of the French Republic, founded on 3 December 1963 by President Charles de Gaulle. The reason for the order's establishment was twofold: to replace the large number of ministerial orders previously awarded by the ministries; and to create an award that can be awarded at a lower level than the Legion of Honour, which is generally reserved for French citizens. It comprises about 185,000 members; 306,000 members have been admitted or promoted in 50 years.

== History ==
The Ordre national du Mérite comprises about 185,000 members; 306,000 members have been admitted or promoted in 50 years. Half of its recipients are required to be women.

=== Defunct ministerial orders ===
The Ordre national du Mérite replaced the following ministerial and colonial orders:

==== Colonial orders ====
- Ordre de l'Étoile d'Anjouan (Order of the Star of Anjouan, 1874)
- Ordre du Nichan El-Anouar (Order of Nishan-e-Anuar or Order of Light, 1887)
- Ordre de l'Étoile Noire (Order of the Black Star, 1889)

==== Special ministerial orders of merit ====
- Ordre du Mérite social (Order of Societal Merit, 1936)
- Ordre de la Santé publique (Order of Public Health, 1938)
- Ordre du Mérite commercial et industriel (Order of Commercial and Industrial Merit, 1939)
- Ordre du Mérite artisanal (Order of Artisanal Merit, 1948)
- Ordre du Mérite touristique (Order of Tourism Merit, 1949)
- Ordre du Mérite combattant (Order of Combatant Merit, 1953)
- Ordre du Mérite postal (Order of Postal Merit, 1953)
- Ordre de l'Économie nationale (Order of the National Economy, 1954)
- Ordre du Mérite sportif (Order of Sports Merit, 1956)
- Ordre du Mérite du travail (Order of Work Merit, 1957)
- Ordre du Mérite militaire (Order of Military Merit, 1957)
- Ordre du Mérite civil (Order of Civil Merit, 1957)
- Ordre du Mérite Saharien (Order of Saharan Merit, 1958)

== Organisation ==
=== Statutes ===
French citizens as well as foreign nationals, men and women, can be received into the order for distinguished military or civil achievements, though of a lesser level than that required for the award of the Legion of Honour. The President of the French Republic is the Grand Master of the order and appoints all its members by convention on the advice of the Government of France. The order has a common Chancellor and Chancery with the Legion of Honour. Every Prime Minister of France is made a Grand Cross of the order after 6 months of service. Jacques Chirac, who would later serve as president, was the first prime minister to receive the Grand Cross of the order ex officio.

=== Classes ===
The Order has five classes, the same as the Legion of Honour:

- Three ranks:
  - Commander (Commandeur): minimum of 5 years in the rank of Officer (for active duty commissioned officers, this is achieved after five years in the rank of Officer)
  - Officer (Officier): minimum of 5 years in the rank of Knight (for active duty commissioned officers, this is achieved after seven years in the rank of Knight)
  - Knight (Chevalier): to be of a minimum age of 35, have a minimum of 10 years of public service (although, in practice, 15 years is the minimum commonly needed to be conferred the rank of Knight), and "distinguished merits" (for active duty commissioned officers, this is achieved after fifteen years of meritorious service)
- Two additional dignities:
  - Grand Cross (Grand-Croix): minimum 3 years in the rank of Grand Officer
  - Grand Officer (Grand Officier): minimum 3 years in the rank of Commander

== Insignia ==
- Knight – wears the Medal on the left chest (bow form for women in dress)
- Officer – wears the Medal with rosette on the left chest (bow form for women in dress)
- Commander – wears the necklet on the neck for men and women (left shoulder in bow form for women in dress)
- Grand Officer – wears the Medal with rosette on the left chest, plus the Star on the right side of the stomach;
- Grand Cross – wears the Sash on the right shoulder to the left hip and the Star on the left side of the stomach.

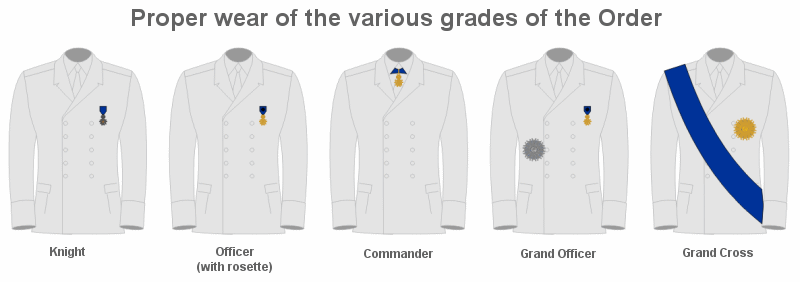

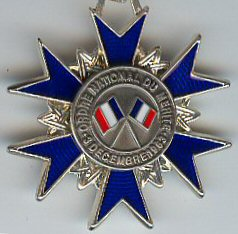
Reverse of the Knight's insignia of the Order

The medal and the plaque of the Order were designed by the French sculptor Max Leognany.

- The medal of the order is a six-armed Maltese asterisk in gilt (silver for chevalier) enamelled blue, with laurel leaves between the arms. The obverse central disc features the head of Marianne, surrounded by the legend République française ('French Republic'). The reverse central disc has a set of crossed tricolores, surrounded by the name of the order and its foundation date. The badge is suspended by a laurel wreath.
- The star (plaque) is worn by Grand-Croix (in gilt on the left breast) and Grand Officier (in silver on the right breast) respectively; it is a twelve-armed sunburst, with rays (formerly plain, now in blue enamel) between the arms. The central disc features the head of Marianne, surrounded by the legend République française and the name of the Order, and in turn surrounded by a wreath of laurel.
- The ribbon for the medal is a solid blue field. For the grade of Officier and above, a rosette is centered in the field. For the grades of Commandeur, Grand Officier, and Grand-Croix, the rosette is centered bar of silver; silver and gold, and a solid gold respectively.

Ordre national du Mérite Ribbons
| Knight | Officer | Commander | Grand Officer | Grand Cross |

=== Buttonhole ===
| Knight | Officer | Commander | Grand Officer | Grand Cross |

== Notable recipients ==
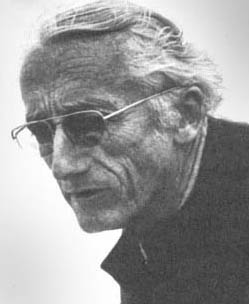
Commandant Jacques Cousteau, a Grand-Croix of the Ordre national du Mérite.

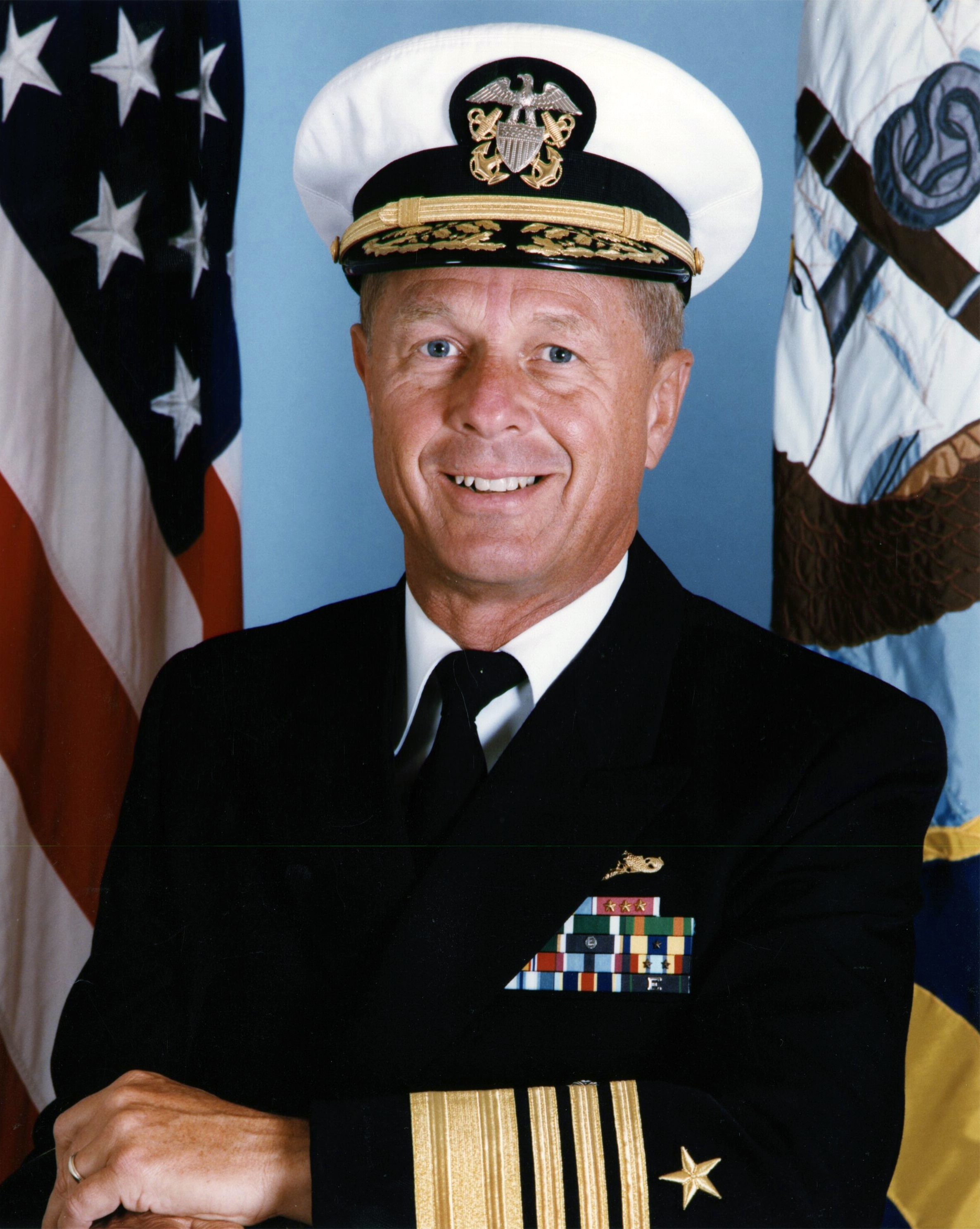
US Navy Admiral Frank Bowman, an Officier of the Ordre national du Mérite
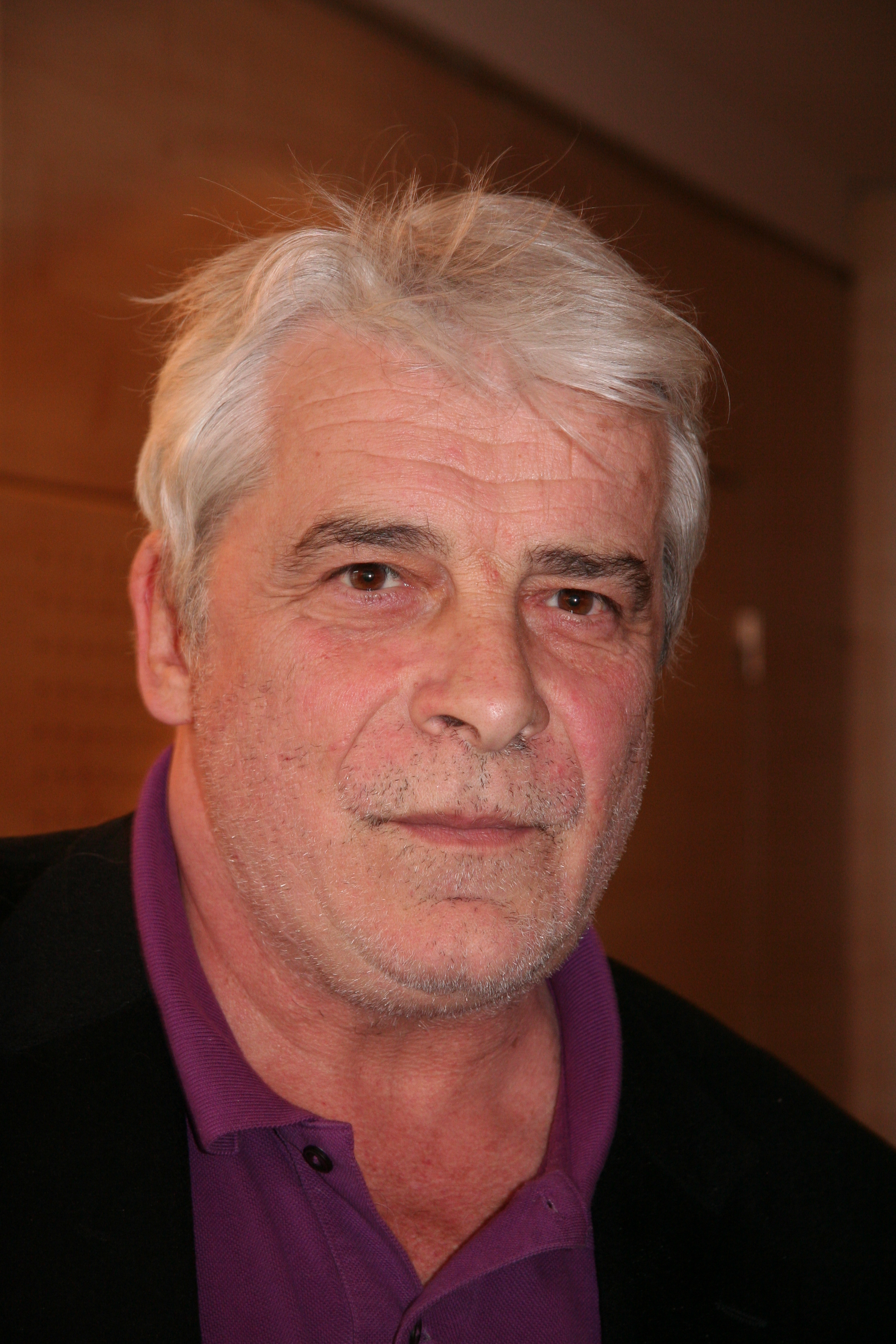
Actor, director and writer Jacques Weber, a Chevalier of the Ordre national du Mérite.

The individuals listed below have been admitted as members of the National Order of Merit:

=== French citizens ===
- Charles Aznavour, actor, composer, songwriter and singer
- Marcel Barrére, rocket scientist
- Sophie Béjean, University president
- Jean-Paul Belmondo, actor
- Marie-Paule Belle, singer
- Arnaud Beltrame, gendarme officer
- Juliette Benzoni, novelist
- Claude Bessy, dancer
- Françoise Cachin, art historian and curator
- Droupgyu Wangmo, Buddhist nun and writer
- Marie-Lise Chanin, physicist
- Jacques Charpentier, composer
- René Clair, writer and filmmaker
- Yves Coppens, anthropologist
- Jacques Cousteau, oceanographer
- Jean Delay, psychiatrist and author
- Alain Delon, actor
- Gérard Depardieu, actor and filmmaker
- Georges Descrières, actor
- Catherine Destivelle, rock climber and mountaineer
- Christian Dumas, biologist
- Laurent Fabius, former Prime Minister of France, politician
- Isabelle Dhordain, journalist and music critic
- Erol Gelenbe, rank of Commander, computer scientist and professor
- President Charles de Gaulle, statesman
- Jacques Gounon, CEO of Groupe Eurotunnel
- Christine Guillemot, computer scientist
- Philippe Gurdjian, racing driver and motorsport promoter
- Aline Heitaa-Archier, educator and Marquesan language advocate
- Isabelle Huppert, actress
- Catherine Jeandel, scientist
- Jean-Baptiste Kempf, software developer/entrepreneur (chevalier)
- Patrick Kron, corporate executive
- General André Lalande, military officer
- Robert Lecou, politician
- Héloïse Adélaïde Letissier, singer and musician
- Thierry Lhermitte, actor and comedian
- Sarah Maldoror, filmmaker and activist
- Marcel Marceau, actor and mime
- Frédéric Mazzella, entrepreneur
- President François Mitterrand, statesman
- Cécile Pelous, philanthropist
- Cathérine Picart, biophysicist and bioengineer
- Francis Pollet, general officer
- Madeleine Riffaud, poet and war correspondent
- Teddy Riner, World and Olympic champion judoka
- Jean-Pierre Rives, sculptor
- Jean-Marc de La Sablière, diplomat
- José-Alain Sahel, ophthalmologist and scientist
- Alice Saunier-Seité, geographer, politician
- Sylvie Tellier, television personality, businesswoman, and beauty pageant titleholder
- Sylvie Vartan, singer
- Dominique Meyer, médical researcher
- Cédric Villani, mathematician
- Emmanuelle Wargon, politician
- Claire Wyart, neuroscientist (chevalier)
- Michèle Bellon, former President of the Directorate ERDF (chevalier)
- Sabine Aubert, conductor
- Marième Badiane, olympic silver medalist basketball player
- Mathias Lessort, olympic silver medalist basketball player
- Victor Wembanyama, olympic silver medalist basketball player
- Jean-Philippe Mateta, olympic silver medalist football player
- Sophie Lavaud, mountaineer
- Henriette Gascuel, pediatrician

=== Foreign nationals ===
- Queen Aishwarya of Nepal
- James R. Allen, U.S. Air Force General
- T. K. Ann, industrialist, legislator and sinologist (Hong Kong)
- Tina Arena, musician and actress (Australia)
- Saïd Bouziri, Tunisian human rights and immigrant rights activist
- Siti Hartinah, First Lady of Indonesia
- Abraham Katz (1926–2013), United States Ambassador to the OECD
- Major-General Kelvin Khong, Singapore Armed Forces, Chief of Air Force (Singapore)
- Queen Komal of Nepal
- Anu Lamp, actress, translator and instructor (Estonia)
- Roméo LeBlanc, journalist and statesman (Canada)
- Vice-Admiral Ron Lloyd CMM CD Commander of the Royal Canadian Navy
- Andreas Maislinger, Founder Austrian Holocaust Memorial Service
- Queen Máxima of the Netherlands
- John McManners, clergyman and historian (UK)
- Empress Emerita Michiko of Japan
- General Mark A. Milley, US Army, 20th Chairman of the Joint Chiefs of Staff (US)
- Villoo Morawala-Patell, corporate executive (India)
- Njoroge Mungai, Cabinet Minister for Foreign Affairs and Businessman (Kenya)
- Muhammad Noer, Ambassador of the Republic of Indonesia to France
- Poniman, Chief of Staff of the Indonesian Army
- Generalleutnant Franz Pöschl, Commanding General of the Bundeswehr III.Korps, recipient of the Knights Cross of the Iron Cross during the Second World War. (Germany)
- Sudharmono, Vice President of Indonesia
- Tyasno Sudarto, Chief of Staff of the Indonesian Army
- Rudini, Chief of Staff of the Indonesian Army
- Achmad Tahir, Ambassador of the Republic of Indonesia to France
- Amb HrM Dr Tebogo Mokope Modjadji Global Women In Investment Corporation South Africa
- Prabowo Subianto, Commander of Army Strategic Reserve Command of Indonesia
- Andika Perkasa, Commander of the Indonesian National Armed Forces
- Hadi Tjahjanto, Minister of Agrarian Affairs and Spatial Planning of Indonesia
- Ginandjar Kartasasmita, Speaker of Indonesia Regional Representative Council
- Fadjar Prasetyo, Chief of Staff of the Indonesian Air Force
- Sir John Barbirolli, conductor and cellist (UK)
- Lamia Moubayed Bissat, Lebanese civil servant
- Béji Caïd Essebsi, President of Tunisia
- Jovanka Broz, First Lady of Yugoslavia
- Queen Camilla of the United Kingdom
- King Juan Carlos I of Spain
- Queen Sofia of Spain
- Queen Letizia of Spain
- Frederik X, King of Denmark
- Queen Mary of Denmark
- Charles Chibitty, US Army, Comanche Code Talker, WW II (US)
- General Wesley Clark, military officer (US)
- Martine Djibo, educator and politician (Ivory Coast)
- Felix Ermacora, politician and expert on human rights (Austria)
- Mizuho Fukushima, politician and member of the House of Councillors (Japan)
- Sivaji Ganesan, actor (India)
- King Gyanendra of Nepal
- Kamal Haasan, actor (India)
- Bruce Jackson, writer and photographer (US)
- Saša Janković, Serbian lawyer and politician
- General James L. Jones, USMC, military officer and diplomat (US)
- Nasser Kamel, Ambassador of Egypt to France (2006–2012)
- Ameer Al-Aidroos, Ambassador of Yemen to France (2006 –2008)
- Ara Babloyan, politician, pediatrician, President of the National Assembly of Armenia
- Narek Sargsyan, architect, Minister of Urban Development of Armenia
- Vigen Sargsyan, politician, Defence Minister of Armenia
- Yvette Jaggi, Swiss national councillor and mayor of Lausanne
- Professor Mari Miura, political scientist, Sophia University (Japan)
- Professor Kathleen O'Flaherty, academic, University College Cork (Ireland)
- Sigurður Pálsson, Icelandic poet, author and translator
- Priya Paul, Entrepreneur (India)
- Goffredo Petrassi, Italian Composer and Conductor
- Joseph W. Pfeifer, Director of the Center for Terrorism and Disaster Preparedness, Fire Department of New York (United States)
- General Jay Raymond, Chief of Space Operations (USSF) & Commander (USSC) (US)
- Michela Schiff Giorgini, Italian Egyptologist
- Léopold Sédar Senghor, poet, politician and cultural theorist (Senegal)
- Mohammad-Reza Shajarian, Iranian Classical Music Vocalist and Maestro
- Admiral Sumner Shapiro, USN, intelligence officer
- Queen Sonja of Norway
- Queen Silvia of Sweden
- Dubravka Stojanović, historian, Serbia
- King Willem-Alexander of the Netherlands
- John T. Preston, M.I.T. lecturer
- Rohini Godbole, Indian Institute of Science Honorary Professor
- Carolyn Steyn, Philanthropist and founder of 67 Blankets for Nelson Mandela Day (South Africa)
- Julia Child, Chef
- Rear Admiral Aaron Beng, Singapore Armed Forces, Chief of Navy (Singapore)
- Christel Takigawa, Announcer of Japan
- Surya Bahadur Thapa, Prime Minister of Nepal
- Marshal Josip Broz Tito, statesman (Yugoslavia)
- Ignacio Fernández Toxo, President of ETUC (Spain)
- Princess Galyani Vadhana, Princess of Naradhiwas (Thailand)
- Victoria, Crown Princess of Sweden
- Watatakalu Yawalapiti, activist and Chief of the Yawalapiti (Brazil)
- General Anthony Zinni, USMC, military officer (US)
- Catherine, Princess of Wales
- Ali Akbar, Pakistani newspaper hawker based in Paris

== See also ==
- List of Foreign recipients of the Ordre national du Mérite
- Order (decoration)
- Ribbons of the French military and civil awards
- State decoration
