= Guillemot (disambiguation) =

Guillemot may refer to:

- Guillemot, several species of seabird
- Christine Guillemot, French computer scientist
- Gisèle Guillemot (1922–2013), French writer and member of the French Resistance during World War II
- Joseph Guillemot (1899–1975), French athlete
- Yves Guillemot, French businessman
- Guillemots (band), a British rock band

== See also ==
- "Guillemot" is used erroneously to refer to Guillemet (« ») in several software specifications.
