= Xingu Indigenous Park =

Indigenous territory in Mato Grosso, Brazil

- Parque Indígena do Xingu
- IUCN category II (national park)
- The southern boundary of Xingu Indigenous Park near Gaúcha do Norte

- Location within Brazil
- Nearest city: Peixoto de Azevedo, Mato Grosso
- Coordinates: 11.232°S 53.185°W
- Area: 2,642,003 hectares (6,528,530 acres)
- Designation: national park Indigenous Territory
- Created: 14 April 1961
- Administrator: ICMBio

The Xingu Indigenous Park (Parque Indígena do Xingu, pronounced [ʃĩˈɡu]) is an Indigenous territory of Brazil, first created in 1961 as a national park in the state of Mato Grosso, Brazil. Its official purposes are to protect the environment and the several nations of Xingu Indigenous peoples in the area.

== Location ==
The Xingu Indigenous Park is on the upper Xingu River in the northeast of the state of Mato Grosso, in the south of the Amazon biome. It covers 26,420 square km (2,642,003 hectares, 6,528,530 acres), with savannah and drier semi-deciduous forests in the south transitioning to Amazon rain forest in the north. There is a rainy season from November to April. The headwaters of the Xingu River are in the south of the park. The area covered by the park was defined in 1961 and covers parts of the municipalities of Canarana, Paranatinga, São Félix do Araguaia, São José do Xingu, Gaúcha do Norte, Feliz Natal, Querência, União do Sul, Nova Ubiratã and Marcelândia in the state of Mato Grosso.

To the east is the basin of the Araguaia River, the main branch of the Tocantins. To the west and south is the Teles Pires branch of the Tapajos River. Much of the surrounding area, except to the north, is now heavily deforested. On the east side the deforested or unforested area extends northeast marking the approximate southeastern edge of the Amazon forest.

At the center of the park a fan of rivers join. These are, counter-clockwise, Ferro River, Steinem, Ronuro, Jatoba, Batavi (or Tamitatoala), Auiiti, Culiseu, Culuene River and Tonguro.

== History ==
The Upper Xingu region was a highly self-organized pre-Columbian anthropogenic landscape, including deposits of fertile agricultural terra preta, black soil in Portuguese, with a network of roads and polities each of which covered about 250 square kilometers.

The Upper Xingu region was heavily populated prior to European and African contact. Densely populated settlements developed from 1200 to 1600 CE. Ancient roads and bridges linked communities that were often surrounded by ditches or moats. The villages were pre-planned and featured circular plazas. Archaeologists have unearthed 19 villages so far.

The upper Xingu was one of the last parts of Brazil to be reached by Europeans. From the north it was protected by the Xingu's many rapids. From the south it was protected by thin settlement and the warlike Bororo and Xavante, among others. In 1884 Karl von den Steinen headed northwest from Cuiabá to some Christianized Bakairi on the upper Teles Pires. They led him two weeks east to the Batavi River where they built canoes. They went downstream and met some uncontacted Bakairi, as well as the Trumai and Suya. In the next 20 years other explorers entered the area, several of whom died. Percy Fawcett disappeared there in 1925.

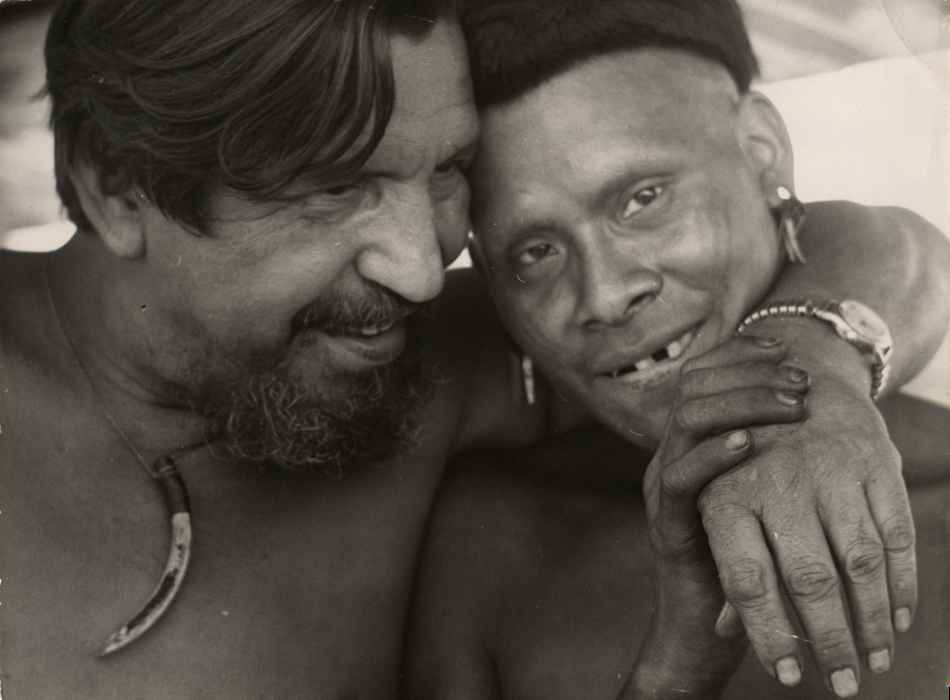
Orlando Villas-Bôas with a man from the Ikpeng tribe in Xingu Indigenous Park, 1967

The national park was created after a campaign by the Villas-Bôas brothers for the protection of the region. An account of the exploration of this area by the Villas-Bôas brothers and their efforts to protect the region is documented in the film Xingu (2011) and in the book by John Hemming, People of the Rainforest: The Villas Boas Brothers, Explorers and Humanitarians of the Amazon (London, 2019).

The Villas-Bôas brothers and three anthropologists and activists had the radical idea of creating a vast area of forest protected solely for its Indigenous inhabitants and invited scientists. This was put to the vice president of Brazil in 1952, at which a much larger park was proposed. However, the proposal was opposed by the state of Mato Grosso which began granting land within the proposed area to colonizing companies. Nine years of bitter political and media struggle ensued, until a new president of Brazil, Jânio Quadros (a family friend of the Villas-Bôas) rammed it through as a presidential decree, but at a greatly reduced area to satisfy the state government. The park came into existence by decree 50.455 of 14 April 1961. (Adjustments were made on 31 July 1961, 6 August 1968 and 13 July 1971. The final demarcation of the perimeter was made in 1978.)

The area was soon given the designation of "Indigenous Park" to cover the dual purpose of protecting the environment and the Indigenous peoples, with all others excluded. It was the first such vast protected area in the world, and was the prototype of large Indigenous territories throughout Amazonia which now protect a significant proportion of surviving tropical rain forests. The Xingu Indigenous Park was initially a presidential department, but is now subject to both the Indigenous agency Funai and the environmental agency Ibama.

By the late 1990s livestock and soya farms to the northeast of the park were starting to reach the park, as was deforestation to the west of the park. The effects of human activity outside the park were starting to pollute the waters of the park. The park remains an island of forest and rivers increasingly threatened by polluting activity and deforestation outside its perimeter.

== Peoples ==
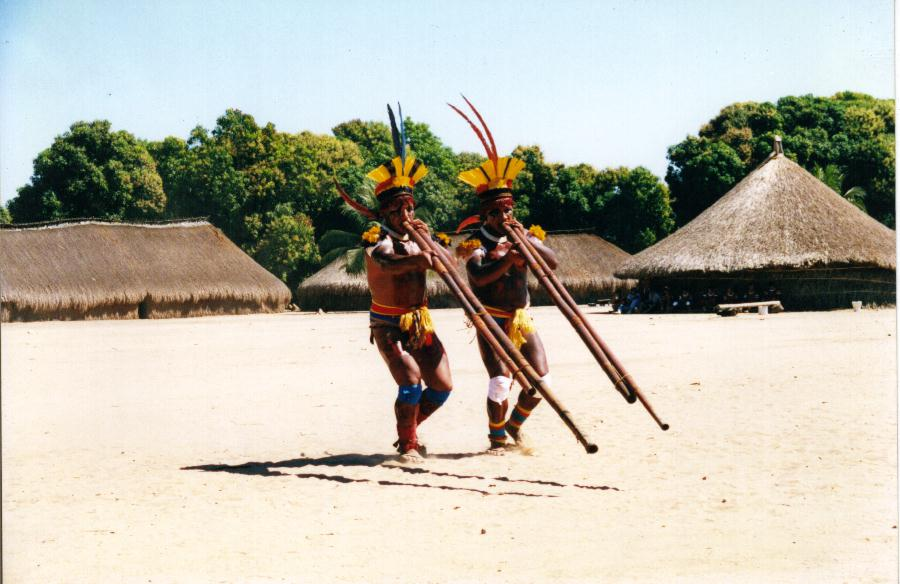
Kamaiurá village at Xingu, yard. Indigenous people playing the uruá flute.

The people living within the boundaries of the park include Kamaiurá (355), Aweti (138), Mehinako (199), Wauja (321), Yawalapiti (208), Kalapalo (417), Kuikuro (415), Matipu (119), Nahukwá (105) and Trumai (120), who all share a common cultural system (population figures as of 2002). Also living within the park are Ikpeng (formerly Txikao) (319), Kaiabi (745), Kisêdjê (formerly Suia) (334), Yudja (formerly Juruna) (248), Tapayuna and Naruvotu peoples (population figures as of 2002).

The Xingu area is of great interest because its rich Indigenous cultures escaped devastation by Europeans and their diseases, thanks to a lack of rubber or mineral resources in the region, and a waterfall-rapid barrier on the Xingu River.

The first explorer to contact and write about the people of the region was the German anthropologist Karl von den Steinen in the 1880s, followed by short visits by other anthropologists and government surveyors. But the first outside permanent residence there was by the São Paulo brothers Orlando and Claudio Villas-Bôas, from 1947 to 1976. They devised a new system for wokring with Indigenous peoples, as friends, helpers and equals rather than as colonialist officials. This is now adopted throughout Brazil. By slowly introducing change at a rate that Indigenous peoples wanted and could absorb, they brought them in only two generations to awareness of all aspects of modern Brazilian society without losing their respect for their traditional communal societies and way of life.

Leaders of Xingu Indigenous groups such as Aritana Yawalapiti and Raoni Metuktire, both trained by the Villas-Bôas brothers, are now spokesmen for all Brazil's Indigenous peoples on a world stage. Since the late 1970s the Director of the Xingu Indigenous Park has been Indigenous, chosen by the area's chiefs.

The leading governing body of the multi-ethnic Xinguano peoples in this territory is the Xingu Indigenous Land Association (ATIX – Associação Terra Indígena Xingu). Created in 1995, ATIX self-identifies as the major representational organization of the 16 ethnic groups across the Xingu Indigenous Territory. Stated aims of the organization are territorial protection and autonomy over the management of Xinguano interests, as well as serving as a key liaison between external partners and XIT communities.

In the sixty years after contact with Von den Steinen, Xingu peoples had been struck by alien diseases such as measles and influenza that reduced their small populations by two-thirds. The Villas-Bôas brothers completely reversed this decline through an agreement with Professor Roberto Baruzzi of a São Paulo teaching hospital, whereby for over fifty years teams of volunteer doctors have inoculated and tended Xingu peoples to the highest medical standards.

In June 1925 the British artillery Lt.-Colonel Percy Harrison Fawcett visited the upper Xingu with his son and son's friend, by the same trail and river route used by all previous visitors. They spent a few days with Aweti and Kalapalo peoples before either being killed by one of these tribes or continuing their journey into the forest. A trained surveyor, Fawcett had between 1907 and 1911 mapped four boundaries for the Bolivian government. A devotee of spiritualism, he became convinced that the Amazon forests might contain a lost city of an extremely ancient 'superior' civilization. After distinguished service in the First World War, Fawcett spent several years pursuing his fantasy in the north-east and other parts of Brazil, before the 1925 incursion to the Xingu. The disappearance of a British lieutenant-colonel, seeking a mystical city in Amazonian forests, caused a media sensation. David Grann wrote an article about this exploration, followed by an expanded book, The Lost City of Z (2009).

List of Indigenous ethnic groups in the park, along with their respective populations as of 2011:

Ethnic group	Population
Aweti	195
Ikpeng	459
Kalapalo	385
Kamaiurá	467
Kawaiweté (Kaiabi)	1,193
Kisêdje (Suiá)	330
Kuikuro	522
Matipu	149
Mehinako	254
Nafukuá	126
Naruvôtu	69
Tapayuna	60
Trumai	97
Waurá	409
Yawalapiti	156
Yudjá (Juruna)	348

== Notable residents ==
- Watatakalu Yawalapiti

== Languages ==
Fourteen Indigenous languages belonging to 5 different language families (including Trumai, a language isolate) are spoken in the park.

Indigenous languages spoken in the southern part of the park (Upper Xingu) are:

- Arawakan languages
  - Waurá
  - Mehinaku
  - Yawalapiti
- Cariban languages
  - Kuikuro
  - Matipu
  - Nahukwa
  - Kalapalo
- Tupian languages
  - Aweti
  - Kamayurá

Indigenous languages spoken in the northern part of the park (Lower Xingu) are:

- Trumai
- Jê languages
  - Suyá
- Tupian languages
  - Juruna (Yudja)
  - Kayabi
- Cariban languages
  - Ikpeng (Txikão)

In the northern part of the park, only Trumai has been spoken in the area for a considerable amount of time. All other languages in the area are from relatively recent arrivals.

== List of villages ==
There are approximately 50 indigenous villages in the park. Below is a list of villages in the Xingu Indigenous Park arranged by ethnic group:

Yudjá

- Pakaia
- Parureda
- Tuba Tuba
- Paksamba
- Pequizal

Kawaiweté
Kawaiweté villages along the Xingu River:

- Caiçara
- Capivara
- Yaitata
- 11 de Setembro (with Kisêdje people)
- Piraquara
- Itaí
- Moitará
- Samaúma
- Tuiararé
- Kwaryja
- Ilha Grande
- Barranco Alto
- Três Irmãos

Kawaiweté villages along the Arraias River:

- Aiporé
- Fazenda João
- Paranaíta
- Mupadá (with Yudjá people)
- Três Patos
- Mainumy
- Sobradinho
- Nova Maraká
- Iguaçu

Kisêdje (in Wawi Indigenous Territory)

- Ngosôkô Nova
- Horerusikhô
- Roptotxi
- Fazenda Ronkho
- Ngojhwêrê

Ikpeng

- Moygu

Trumai

- Boa Esperança
- Três Lagoas
- Steinen

Kamaiurá

- Morená
- Jacaré
- Ipavu

Nafukuá

- Kranhãnhã
- Nafukuá
- Yaramy

Matipu

- Matipu
- Buritizal

Yawalapiti

- Yawalapiti

Waurá

- Piyulaga

Mehinaku

- Mehinaku
- Utawana

Aweti

- Saidão da Fumaça (founded in 2002)
- Tazu'jyt tetam ("village of the small fire ant")
- Mirassol

Kuikuro

- Ipatse
- Afukuri
- Lahatua
- Kuluani
- Agata (Barranco Queimado)
- Curumim

Kalapalo

- Aiha
- Tanguro
- Caramujo
- Kunué
- Lago Azul
- Pingoa

== Sources ==
- O Parque (in Portuguese), ISA: Instituto Socioambiental, archived from the original on 2016-04-20
