= Aritana Yawalapiti =

Brazilian indigenous rights activist (1949–2020)

- Born: 15 July 1949
- Died: 5 August 2020 (aged 71); Goiânia, Brazil
- Occupation: Ecologist

Aritana Yawalapiti (15 July 1949 – 5 August 2020) was a Brazilian cacique (tribal chieftain) of the Yawalapiti indigenous tribe of Brazil inside the Xingu Indigenous Park. He served as President of the Instituto de Pesquisa Etno Ambiental Xingu.

== Biography ==
He was the son of indigenous chief Paru Yawalapiti and his wife, Tepori Kamaiurá. During his childhood, he was mentored by the Villas-Bôas brothers, who taught him the importance of maintaining a natural habitat.

In 1964, when he was 15 years old, he met the former king Leopold III of Belgium while the latter was on an expedition into indigenous reservations in Mato Grosso.

Prepared from a young age, Yawalapiti ascended to the rank of cacique in the 1980s, devoting himself to the rights of indigenous people in Brazil. In particular, he focused on the environment, demarcation of land, health, and education. His action earned him the representation of other indigenous groups in the Xingu Indigenous Park. He was interviewed in the documentary Despertar das Amazonas in 2009.

Aritana Yawalapiti died from COVID-19 in Goiânia, on 5 August 2020, during the COVID-19 pandemic in Brazil.
