= Juruna language =

Tupian language spoken in Brazil

Juruna
- Yudjá
- Native to: Brazil
- Region: Xingu Indigenous Park, Mato Grosso
- Ethnicity: Yudjá
- Native speakers: 280 (2006)
- Language family: Tupian: Yuruna; Juruna

Language codes
- ISO 639-3: jur
- Glottolog: juru1256
- ELP: Juruna
- Linguasphere: 88-JAA-aa
- 88-JAB-ab

The Juruna language, also known as Yudjá, is spoken in Brazil. It is spoken in the Xingu Indigenous Park of Mato Grosso state. In 2001 there were 278 native speakers. It is the last survivor of the Yuruna languages.

== Phonology ==
=== Vowels ===
Oral vowels
	Front	Central	Back
Close	i iː	ɨ ɨː	u uː
Mid	e eː		
Open		a aː	

Nasal vowels
	Front	Central	Back
Close	ĩ	ɨ̃	ũ
Mid	ẽ		
Open		ã	

Phoneme	Allophone
/u/	[u], [ɯ], [ʊ], [o]
/i/	[i], [ɪ]
/ũ/	[ũ], [ʊ̃], [õ]
/ã/	[ã], [ɜ̃]
/ĩ/	[ĩ], [ɪ̃]

=== Consonants ===
		Labial	Dental/ Alveolar	Palatal	Velar	Glottal
Stop	voiceless	p	t̪	tʃ	k	ʔ
Stop	voiced	b	d̪	dʒ		
Nasal		m	n			
Tap			ɾ			
Fricative	voiceless		s	ʃ		h
Fricative	voiced		z			
Fricative	lateral		ɬ			
Approximant		w		j		

Phoneme	Allophone
/t/	[t̪], [t]
/d/	[d̪], [d]
/tʃ/	[tʃ], [tʲ]
/dʒ/	[dʒ], [dʲ]
/h/	[h], [ɸ]
/z/	[z], [dz]
/ɾ/	[ɾ], [ɾ̃], [ɻ]
/w/	[w], [w̃], [β]
/j/	[j], [j̃], [ɲ]
