= Matipu =

Total population
- 149 (2011)

Regions with significant populations
- Brazil (Mato Grosso)

Languages
- Kuikúro-Kalapálo, formerly Matipuhy

Related ethnic groups
- Kalapalo, Kuikuro, and Nahukuá

The Matipu people are an Indigenous people of Brazil. They live in the southern part of the Xingu Indigenous Park in the state of Mato Grosso. Their a population is estimated at 149 individuals in 2011, up from population of 40 in the 1995 census. They are mainly of animist faith and share many cultural traits with other Xingu peoples.

== Name ==
They are also known as the Mariape-Nahuqua and Matipuhy.

== Language ==
The Matipu traditional spoke the Matipu language, a Carib language, but there are only 10 known living speakers (Campbell 2012). They currently speak the Kuikúro-Kalapálo language.

== Subsistence ==
To provide for themselves, the Matipu hunt, fish, and farm. Manioc and maize are their primary crops.

== See also ==
- Indigenous peoples in Brazil
- List of Indigenous peoples in Brazil
- Indigenous peoples of the Americas
