= Trumai language =

Endangered language isolate of Brazil

Trumaí
- Tramalhy
- ho kod ke
- Native to: Brazil
- Region: upper Xingu River region of the Xingu Indigenous Park
- Ethnicity: 120 Trumai people (2006)
- Native speakers: 51 of varying fluency (2006)
- Language family: Language isolate

Language codes
- ISO 639-3: tpy
- Glottolog: trum1247
- ELP: Trumai
- Trumai is classified as Critically Endangered by the UNESCO Atlas of the World's Languages in Danger.

Trumai is an endangered language isolate spoken by the Trumai people located in the Xingu reserve along the Upper Xingu River in central Brazil. Most Trumai are fluent in languages of wider communication, and children are not learning it well. It is highly divergent from other South American languages, such as distinguishing unusual consonants.

Murphy and Quain reported that there were only 25 people remaining in the Trumai community. This has since increased to 94 as of 1997, of which 51 people spoke the Trumai language. In the International Encyclopedia of Linguistics, Grimes observes that there are 78 speakers as of 2003. Due to the popularity of speaking Portuguese among the local population, Trumai is considered an extremely endangered language because the children are not learning to speak it as a first language.

== History ==
The Trumai people first entered the Upper Xingu region sometime in the early 19th century after being driven away from southeastern Brazil by the Xavante people. The first contact the Trumai had with a non native person of that region was in 1884 when Karl von den Steinen explored the Upper Xingu region. He observed the differences between Trumai culture and other Xingu cultures due to the Trumai's relocation. In the fifty years or so that followed Von den Steinem's first visit to the Trumai, there is little documentation of the community because researchers who visited the Xingu region preferred visiting and studying other indigenous cultures instead.

In the time between the Trumai's first arrival in the upper Xingu and Von den Steinen's first contact with them, they were continuously being attacked by the native communities in the region, including the Suyá and Ikpeng. Following a period of contacts from researchers, including Buell Quain in 1938, the Trumai moved to a new territory again, this time because of a flu and measles epidemic. After recovering from this, the subsequent population increase led to the emergence of more Trumai villages in the Upper Xingu region, while their former territories have since become occupied by other communities.

== Classification ==
Despite being surrounded by a variety of different languages that belong to the four major stocks of Brazilian indigenous languages (Tupi, Arawak, Cariban, and Ge), Trumai is an isolated language.

== Documentation ==
Initial research done on the Trumai was included in an overall study of the cultures of the Xingu region, which was performed through surveys focussing on "material culture". Quain was the first researcher to focus on the Trumai culture specifically, however, this was an anthropological study, not linguistic. In the preface to her thesis "A Reference Grammar of Trumaí", Guirardello states that Monod-Becquelin was the first person to conduct descriptive studies on the Trumai language, in which she focused on aspects of the language such as ergativity and phonological transcriptions.

Guirardello's "A Reference Grammar of Trumai" is the first proper description of Trumai grammar, which Guirardello composed with the intention of it becoming an aid for future research papers on the language. Since then, research on the Trumai language has increased, leading to studies of various aspects of the language. Monod-Becquelin has continued her research by investigating the use of transitive verbs in Trumai. Guirardello's work has also included studies into Trumai's ergativity, focussing on the ergative-absolutive patterns in its morphology and the complexity of its syntax due to the nominative-accusative patterns also present.

Trumai was one of the 24 indigenous languages studied in South America as part of a series of documentation projects conducted by DoBeS (Documenting Endangered Languages). DoBeS is one of the many language documentation organizations operating in Brazil, and is funded by the Volkswagen Foundation.

== Geographic distribution ==
Trumai is spoken in four villages, three of which are in Parque Indígena do Xingu. There are a few dozen fluent speakers among an ethnic population of about 100 people.

- Três Lagoas (with families from the former village of Terra Preta), in Parque Indígena do Xingu
- Boa Esperança, in Parque Indígena do Xingu
- Steinen, in Parque Indígena do Xingu
- Wani Wani (a recently formed village), in Terra Indígena Capoto-Jarina

== Language contact ==
Jolkesky (2016) notes that there are lexical similarities with the Macro-Mataguayo–Guaykuru, Tupi, and Mochika language families due to contact.

Similarities with the Macro-Mataguayo–Guaykuru languages and Tupi–Guarani languages indicate that Trumai had originated in the Paraguay River basin. The Trumai had only arrived in the Upper Xingu basin via the Culuene River during the 19th century (Villas Bôas & Villas Bôas 1970:27).

== Phonology ==
=== Consonants ===
		Bilabial	Labiodental	Dental	Alveolar	Palatal	Velar
Plosive	Voiceless	p		t̪ ⟨t⟩	t ⟨ţ⟩		k
Plosive	Ejective			t̪ʼ ⟨tʼ⟩	tʼ ⟨ţʼ⟩		kʼ
Plosive	Voiced				d		
Nasal		m			n		
Affricate	Voiceless			t͡s			
Affricate	Ejective			t͡sʼ			
Fricative			f	s		ʃ ⟨ch⟩	x
Approximant	Voiced	w			l	j ⟨y⟩	
Approximant	Voiceless				ɬ ⟨tl⟩		
Tap					ɾ		

This inventory is atypical of Amazonian languages in its ejective consonants, the lateral fricative /ɬ/, and the alveolar versus dental distinction. Young speakers do not always make the ejective distinction.

=== Vowels ===
	Front	Central	Back
High	i	ɨ ⟨ï⟩	u
Non-high	e	a	o

=== Phonotactics ===
Syllable structure is (C)V(C) and stress falls on the final syllable of a word.

== Morphology ==
The morphological aspects of Trumai as covered in Guirardello's grammar of the language include the parts of speech: nouns, verbs, and auxiliaries. Under nouns, she investigates the effect of adjectives, plurality in the language, and count versus mass nouns, among others. Under verbs, she focuses on causality, negation, intensity, and imperativity in verb particles. And under auxiliaries, she discusses body posture, mood and aspect, and directional auxiliaries. Chapter 5 explores further analyses of each of these aspects of the parts of speech in terms of "Simple Declarative Clauses".

Pronouns in Trumai are distinguished by person, gender, number, and listener inclusion/exclusion in the first-person plural pronoun. Like in English, gender is only seen in the third-person singular pronoun, while number is categorized as singular, dual, and plural (whereas English only has singular and plural). They are also affected by the type of Noun Phrase (henceforth "NP") they appear in (absolutive, ergative, or dative), which are distinguished by suffix insertion. The following are tables of the Trumai personal pronouns with examples included for the absolutive case:

Absolutive
		Singular	Dual	Plural
1	excl	ha	ha a	ha wan
1	incl	ha	ka a	ka wan
2		hi	hi a	hi wan
3	masc	ine	inak a	inak wan
3	fem	inatl	inak a	inak wan

ha hu’tsa chï(_in) [huksitukuk yi]-ki [yayanke tam]
1 see FOC/TENS capybara YI-DAT deer COM
"I saw a capybara and a deer."

Ergative
		Singular	Dual	Plural
1	excl	hai-ts OR hai-k	ha ana-k	ha wan-ek
1	incl	hai-ts OR hai-k	ka ana-k	ka wan-ek
2		hi-k OR ha-k	hi ana-k	hi wan-ek
3	masc	ine-k	inak ana-k	inak wan-ek
3	fem	inatl-ek	inak ana-k	inak wan-ek

[Karu], [Kumaru], [Atawaka] hai-ts amidoxos ke.
Karu Kumaru Atawaka 1-ERG call KE
‘I called Karu, Kumaru, and Atawaka.’

Dative
		Singular	Dual	Plural
1	excl	hai-tl	ha ana-ki	ha wan-ki
1	incl	hai-tl	ka ana-ki	ka wan-ki
2		hi-tl	hi ana-ki	hi wan-ki
3	masc	ine-tl	inak ana-ki	inak wan-ki
3	fem	inatl-etl	inak ana-ki	inak wan-ki

kiki-k atlat-ø kïţï {ha wan-ki}.
man-ERG pan-ABS give 1-DAT
‘The man gave it to us.’

1st-person/exclusive pronouns are formed in ha, inclusive with ka, 2nd person with hi, and 3rd with in. Dual number is indicated by the suffix -a, and plural by -wan. Masculine and feminine are distinguished in the 3rd person. Alienable possession is indicated by the suffix -kte or -kate on the possessor (Kumaru-kte tahu 'Kumaru's spoon'), and inalienable possession by juxtaposition (dinoxo kuʃ 'the girl's head', ha kuʃ 'my head'). Suffixes are used to mark ergative (-ts for 1sg, otherwise -ek/-ak), dative, locative, allative, comitative, and instrumental case.

One interesting phenomenon in Trumai morphology is the use of particles in the language. Guirardello first discusses them as a form of identifying tense in lieu of the tense–aspect–mood affixes used in English. These word formations are ka in, used for present or the recent past, and chï in, for past tense, but they are only used when the tense is not indicated via context. In a sentence, these particles appear as so:

ka_in:

[[Yaka] chumuchu] ka_in tehnene-n.
Yaka lie.down FOC/TENS floor-LOC
‘Yaka lay.down on the floor.’

chï_in:

[ha ayen]-atl chï_in [hai]-ts [oke yi] kï̡tï.
1 grandfather-DAT FOC/TENS 1-ERG medicine YI give
‘I gave medicine to my grandfather (emphasis).’

As a whole, particles in Trumai are defined as a verb modifier that is not an adverb or auxiliary instead of being placed in a class of its own. There are four classes of particles in Trumai: Intensity, Negation, Causative, and Intensity. These modifiers fall under the 'particle' label because of their characteristics which differentiate them from auxiliaries. For example, while auxiliaries can only modify verbs, Intensity and Negation particles can also modify adverbs and quantifiers.

In the language, auxiliaries are defined as verb modifiers "associated with the domain of aspect, mood, and spatial orientation (this last domain is subdivided into body posture of the entity performing the event and directionality of the event being performed)". Here are some examples of each of these auxiliaries used in sentences:

Aspect/Mood:

iyi sone-kma-n de.
IYI drink-PERF-3ABS already
‘He already finished drinking.’ OR ‘He already drank all.’

Body Posture:

iyi ma chumuchu-n.
IYI eat lie-3ABS
‘He is eating lying (on the floor).’

Directionals:

ha ka’chï lako.
1 walk {DIR(down hill)}
‘I go down walking.'

Guirardello makes a point of noting the significant differences between auxiliaries and verbs in Trumai: there is no independent argument structure, no lexical content, some experience phonological reduction, and they form a closed class. Their syntactic position is restricted to following a verb in the VP, which distinguishes them from adverbs, which hold a more flexible position in sentences. Apart from appearing inside the VP following the verb, a property of some auxiliaries is that "they can bear the 3Abs enclitic -n/-e".

== Syntax ==
=== Alignment ===
Trumai is a language with ergative–absolutive case assignment and has three argument types: absolutive, ergative, and dative. The ergative-absolutive language system is described as that "in which a subject in an intransitive construction is realized in the same way as a patient or object in a transitive construction, and is thus distinguished from the subject or agent in the transitive". It is "manifested through case-marking, verb-marking, and word order".

Dative case is used for verbs such as 'eat', 'see', and 'talk with'. There are two verbs for 'kill', one, -fa, which takes a dative, and one, disi, which takes the ergative. Constituent order is basically ergative-absolutive-verb-dative (SV, SVB, AOV, AOVB). Ergative and dative arguments, which are marked by postpositions, may occur on the other side of the verb, but for an absolutive to do this, it needs to be marked with ke.

In noun phrases (including pronouns), the grammatical case is marked by an enclitic. For example, an ergative NP would end in either -ek or -k. Case marking using enclitics also occurs for Dative, Locative, and Genitive cases. In the case of personal pronouns, the first person singular pronoun also allows the enclitic -ts. The first person singular pronoun is also changed from ha in Absolutive case to hai for Ergative and Dative cases.

An interesting phenomenon in Trumai syntax is the NP morpheme iyi/yi because of its lack of a clear function. It always appears phrase-final, as iyi when only the noun itself is included in the phrase, but as yi when pluralizers or other lexical items are also included. However, despite this rule, there are still occasions where iyi appears in an NP with a lexical item. When it is present in Ergative and Dative sentences, the enclitics for each case are still added to the end of the NP:

Reduced form:

[inatl yi] {pech ka_in}.
3P(FEM) run FOC/TENS
‘She is running.’

No lexical item:

[iyi] {pech-e ka_in.}
run-3.ABS FOC/TENS
‘She/he is running.’

Ergative/Dative:

[ni’dak wan yi]-k chï_in ha disi.
that.one PL -ERG FOC/TENS 1 beat
‘They (these ones) beat me.’

For verb phrases in Trumai, case marking provides four verb categories: Intransitive, Transitive, Extended Intransitive, and Extended Transitive, where Intransitive verbs can have Absolutive case, Transtive verbs have Absolutive and Ergative case, and the Extended categories also have Dative case on top of this. Guirardello labels arguments as S, A, O, and DAT for case-marking instead of terms such as agent and patient.

Guirardello observed three types of clauses in Trumai sentences. Intransitive clauses attach the case marking /-ø/ to the S noun phrase or attach the third person enclitic -n/-e to the end of the verb phrase. Transitive clauses have A marked by -(V)k and O marked by -ø. Similarly to Intransitive clauses, the third person enclitic is added to the VP when A is absent. In Ditransitive clauses, the same marking occurs for A and O that we see in Transitive clauses. The DAT argument is marked by either -(V)tl, -ki, or -(V)s "depending on the characteristics of the head of the NP". No marking is attached to the VP when DAT is absent from the sentence. These clauses are proof of the Ergative-Absolutive argument of Trumai, as we see S and O undergo the same marking, while A is treated differently. In sentences, they would appear as follows:

Intransitive:

S V
pet’ew-ø achïkida
frog-ABS jump
‘The frog jumps.’ (256)

Transitive:

A {} V
ine-k Ø mapa-n
3-ERG {} break-3.ABS
‘He broke it (a valuable pan).'

Ditransitive:

A O V DAT
kiki-k atlat-ø kïţï kasoro-s
1-ERG rice-ABS give dog-DAT
‘I gave rice to the dogs.'

The absolutive argument is obligatory and therefore occurs in all clause types. Its case-marking is -ø or it has none at all and its syntactic placement is within the VP, before the verb (Guirardello is not clear as to whether it appears immediately before the verb or if other lexical items can be placed between them).

The ergative argument is marked by -(V)k and only occurs in transitive clauses, where it is the main argument of the verb and is therefore always required. Its syntactic placement is preceding the VP. While there are certain scenarios where it can be absent from a sentence that mainly occurs when there is discourse continuity. If it occurs without this, then the sentence has passive or middle voice.

The dative argument is marked by -(V)tl, -ki, or -(V)s. Like the ergative argument, it occurs before and outside of the VP. It is only obligatory in Extended clauses, where it is the main argument of the verb.

Trumai's causative construction uses the particle ka, which appears after the verb and can modify it. For Intransitive and Extended Transitive verbs, the causee is marked as Absolutive, while the causer is marked as ergative. While this makes it similar to a simple transitive clause, the difference is that the Absolutive enclitic is marked on the particle instead of the verb. For Transitive verbs, both the causee and causer are marked ergative:

hai-ts Yakairu-ø sa ka.
1-ERG Yakairu-ABS dance CAUS
‘I made Yakairu dance.’ [Intransitive verb]

hai-ts sa ka-n.
1-ERG dance CAUS-3.ABS
‘I made her dance.'

== Semantics ==
=== Quantifiers ===
In Trumai, quantifiers appear before the noun they modify. For numerals, while the language includes the names for 1–10, most often only numbers 1–5 are spoken:

1. mihin
2. huch
3. huch tahme

pine pine-kte len
friend friend-GEN group

ine k'ad kel-an
3MASC hand finger-LOC

Other quantifier words (ex. 'few', 'many', etc.) change depending on whether they appear before count or mass nouns. They also vary from speaker to speaker, as in the case of "few" versus "a little", some speakers can distinguish the two based on how they appear before count vs. non-count words, while others cannot except for "high quantities". When they are distinguished, the quantifiers used by some speakers are:

	Before count nouns	Before mass nouns
Many/a lot	a' dï	pïx
Few/a little	a' dï tak (many-NEG)	pïx tak (a lot-NEG)

While most speakers, who cannot distinguish between count and mass nouns for small quantities, say:

	Before count nouns	Before mass nouns
Many/a lot	a' dï	pïx
Few/a little	pïx tak	

Aside from the above forms, there is an alternate form to describe small quantities: paţ 'few', which is meant to describe a small portion of an object. Here are some examples for each type of the above quantifiers:

Many/a lot:

{} a'di ka_in k'ate yi.
(count) many FOC/TENS fish YI
'There are many fish.' (or: 'The fish are many/big in quantity.')

Many/a lot:

{} pïx ka_in misu yi.
(mass) a.lot FOC/TENS water YI
'There is a lot of water.' (or: 'The water is big in quantity.')

Few/a little:

{} a'di tak ka_in k'ate yi.
{(some speakers)} many NEG FOC/TENS fish YI
'There are a few fish.' (or: 'The fish are not many.')

Few/a little:

{} pïx tak ka_in k'ate yi.
{(most speakers)} a.lot NEG FOC/TENS fish YI
'There are a few fish.' (or: 'The fish are not many.')

Few:

atlat paţ
clay.pan small
'small clay.pan.'

Just as is seen above where 'few/a little' are formed as 'many/a lot' plus a negation, there is no word for 'none', so negation is added in its place as well:

katnon take tak [kiki wan yi].
work DESID NEG man PL YI
'No man wants to work.' (lit: 'The men do not want to work.')

Quantifiers (numeral and otherwise) can also appear as a clause predicate or a focussed unit, in which they appear at the beginning of a sentence and are followed by a focus/tense particle.

Person plays a crucial role in what NP a quantifier is assigned to. Guirardello explains that in a sentence where there is both first- and third-person nouns/pronouns, it is clear that the quantifier is attached to the third-person. This is not as clear when there are two third-person NPs in a sentence. In order to understand which NP the quantifier is modifying in this scenario, one must look at what kinds of NPs are in the clause with the quantifier and if it is also being modified by a pluralizer.
