= Watatakalu Yawalapiti =

Brazilian and Yawalapiti environmental activist

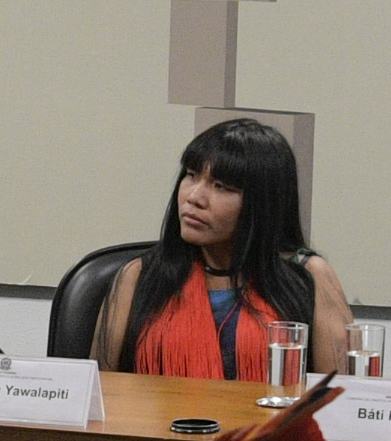
- Yawalapiti in 2020
- Born: 1980 (age 45–46); Xingu Indian Park, Brazil
- Occupations: Indigenous activist; Environmental activist
- Organization(s): Former Executive Coordinator of ATIX Mulher, Co-Founder of ANMIGA
- Awards: Ordre national du Mérite

Watatakalu Yawalapiti (born 1980) is a Brazilian and Yawalapiti Xingu feminist, environmental, and indigenous activist who served as the Executive Coordinator of ATIX Mulher and as co-founder of ANMIGA (National Articulation of Indigenous Women Warriors of Ancestry). She rose to prominence for her activism, especially during the COVID-19 pandemic. She has been awarded the Ordre national du Mérite.

== Biography ==
She was born and raised in the Xingu Indigenous Park, to two Xingu tribal leaders. From a young age, she was immersed in environmental activism, indigenous activism, and cultural tradition. At 11, she went into a period of seclusion for three years, required for all Xingu women. She was allowed to leave seclusion at 14, and was immediately placed in an arranged marriage, but ultimately chose a different partner. At 17, she began her activism, starting with a statement to the Indigenous Health Council. She was mocked, but gained courage to continue activism efforts.

She became Executive Coordinator of ATIX Mulher, the women-focused subbranch of the Xingu governing body ATIX (Associação Terra Indígena Xingu), in 2019. She then became a prominent Xingu environmental activist. She also co-founded the National Movement of Indigenous Women Warriors of the Amazon (ANMIGA). In this capacity, she has promoted Xingu crafts and traditional culture.

During COVID, her family was devastated: eight members of her close family, including her mother and her uncle, died to COVID, partially due to disinformation and what she alleges to be insufficient federal support. She became a prominent voice for health policy reform during this time.

She helped lead an Indigenous Products Fair in Alter do Chão, Pará in 2022. By 2023, she had become recognized as a chief of the Yawalapiti people and one of the Xingu peoples's main international representatives. She has also widely been seen as a potential successor for the position of Chief of the Xingu Peoples.

She did not run for re-selection as coordinator of ATIX Mulher in November 2024.

She was awarded the Ordre national du Mérite by French Ambassador to Brazil Emmanuel Lenain in 2026.
