= Yudjá =

Total population
- 348 (2010)

Regions with significant populations
- Brazil (Mato Grosso)

Languages
- Yudjá, Portuguese

Religion
- traditional tribal religion

The Yudjá or Juruna are an Indigenous people of Brazil. They were formerly the major tribe along the Xingu River, but are now divided into two groups, a westernized northern group near Altamira, Para near the big bend of the Xingu and a more conservative group in the Xingu Indigenous Park at the headwaters of the Xingu in Mato Grosso. The southern group lives in two villages located near the mouth of the Maritsauá-Mitau River. They fish and raise crops, such as manioc.

== Name ==
"Yudjá" is what they call themselves and now the standard name. "Juruna" is an exonym, apparently from Lingua Geral meaning ‘black mouth’ from a kind of face paint or tattoo they formerly used. “Juruna” (Yuruna languages) is also the name of a language group.

Other spellings are Iuruna, Jaruna, Yudya, Yurúna, Juruna, Yuruna, Juruhuna, Jurûna, and Geruna.

== Culture ==
Yudjá makes carinated pots with zoomorphic figures on the rims. The pots are similar to the cambuchi caguaba of the Tupi people.

== Population and history ==
Population estimates are: 1500: 7,000; 1842: 2,000; 1884: 200; 1896: 150; 1916: 52; 1950: 37; 2001: 278

They were once the major tribe along the Xingu. They encountered the Portuguese some time after 1615 and by about 1750 they had abandoned the lower Xingu. In 1686 they defeated the Portuguese and their Kuruaya allies During the rubber boom a group fled from near the town of São Félix do Xingu south to Mato Grosso. Later they worked for another rubber baron, crewing boats downriver to Altamira. When, in 1916, 22 of these men died they fled further south to what is now the Xingu Indigenous Park. Here they fought the Kamayurá and Suyá and were conquered by the Suya until the Suya were themselves defeated by a Portuguese rubber baron from downstream.

In 1989 only one member of the northern group was able to communicate in Juruna.

== Language ==
The Yudjá or Jurúna language belongs to the Yurúna language family, one of the Tupian languages.

== See also ==
- Indigenous peoples in Brazil
- List of indigenous peoples in Brazil
