= Christine Guillemot =

French computer scientist

Christine Guillemot (French: [kʁistin ɡijmo]) is a French computer scientist, a director of research for the French Institute for Research in Computer Science and Automation (Inria), affiliated with the University of Rennes 1. Her research concerns image processing, including super-resolution imaging, inpainting, and light field imaging.

Guillemot has a Ph.D. from Télécom Paris, and worked for France Telecom from 1985 to 1997, when she took her current position at Inria. She was named as an IEEE Fellow in 2013, "for contributions to image and video compression". She became a knight of the Ordre national du Mérite in 2010, and an officer of the order in 2021.
