= Mehinaku =

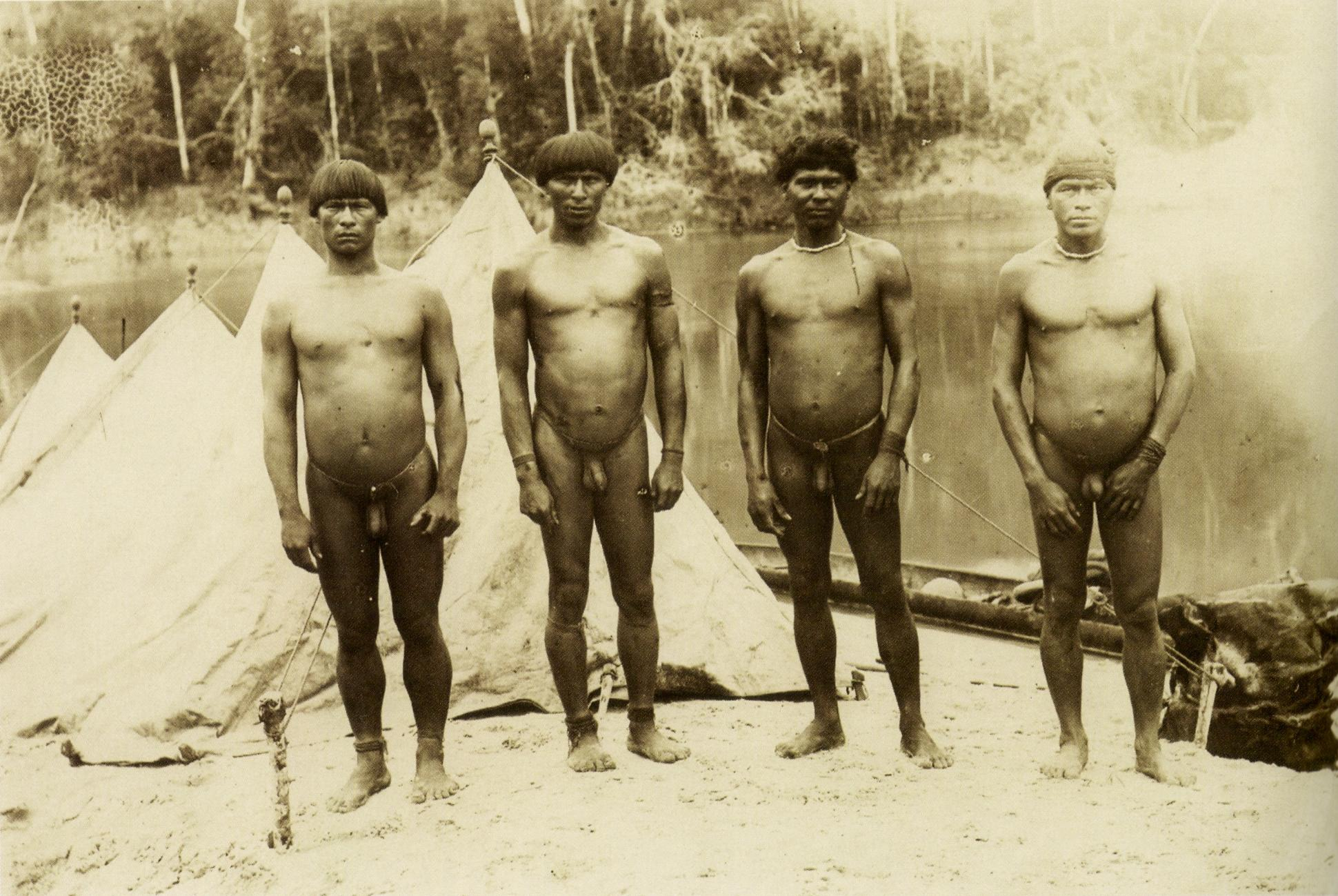
- Mehinaku men, ca. 1894

Total population
- 254 (2011)

Regions with significant populations
- Brazil (Mato Grosso)

Languages
- Mehinaku, Portuguese

The Mehinaku, Mehináko or Mehinacu are an Indigenous people of Brazil. They live in the Indigenous Park of the Xingu, located around the headwaters of the Xingu River in Mato Grosso. They currently reside in an area around the Tuatuari and Kurisevo Rivers. They had a population of 254 in 2011, up slightly from 200 in 2002.

== Name ==
The Mehinaku are also known as the Mehináko, Meinaco, Meinacu, Meinaku, Mehináku, Mahinaku, Mehinaco, and Minaco people.

== Language ==
The Mehinaku speak the Mehináku language, an Arawakan language. They also speak some Portuguese. A dialect of their language, Waurá-kumá is related to the Waurá language.

== History ==
Like many indigenous tribes, the Mehinaku do not keep detailed, chronological historical records going back more than a few generations. The oldest known village established by the Mehinaku was set up sometime around or before 1850 and was called Yulutakitsi. However, because the community no longer exists, the exact location of its former site is unknown.

According to the Mehinaku, historical villages were located along the Tuatuari river, north of the main Aweti village. The Mehinaku claim their older villages were much larger; which is likely because European explorers had not brought the diseases that indigenous people had no immunity to. These communities were likely abandoned for a variety of reasons, overused soil, intrusion of leaf-cutter ant colonies, and a tribal taboo associated with living in places where many people had died.

In 1884, when the first German explorers arrived at the Xingu River headwaters and began to document the tribes living there, the Mehinaku had two villages and a camping site used only during the dry season. Many anthropologists believe that, at the time, the population of the region may have been more than four times what it is today, and that the villages were likely much larger.

In the 1950s, the Ikpeng, a separate tribal group, invaded Mehinaku territory and drove them from it. During the invasion, the Mehinaku chief was called [?] by an arrow. Another tribe, the Yawalapiti, was forced to do the same. This tribal migration forced a political shift in the upper Xingu region.

The Yawalapiti gave the Mehinaku one of their houses at a location called Jalapapuh, and Aweti agreed to divide territory along a trail between their village and the new Mehinaku center. For around a decade, the Mehinaku built communities around their new cultural center, until an outbreak of flu and measles killed around 15 people in the 1960s. After that, the Mehinaku relocated to a nearby area. The Mehinaku moved again in 1981 but did not go far from their original community. The proximity of a post where they could receive medical care gave them little incentive to relocate to their ancestral homeland, although the risks from the Ikpeng were gone by that time.

== Culture ==
The Mehinaku have no provision for privacy in their social arrangements, and live with a striking degree of transparency. Huts that house families of ten or twelve people have no internal walls, and are situated around an open area that is in constant view. On the rare occasions when members of the group are out of sight, their activities can be inferred by their curious fellow villagers, who are able to recognize (and draw from memory) each other's footprints. Gregor sums up the situation by writing: "Each individual's whereabouts and activities are generally known to his relatives and often to the community as a whole. A Mehinaku has little chance of staying out of the public eye for any length of time."

== Subsistence ==
The Mehinaku hunt, fish, and farm to provide for themselves. Their primary crops are manioc and maize.
