= Yawalapiti =

Indigenous tribe of the Amazonian Basin, Brazil

Total population
- 262 (2014)

Regions with significant populations
- Brazil (Mato Grosso)

Languages
- Yawalapiti, Portuguese

Religion
- traditional tribal religion

Related ethnic groups
- Kiabi, Suya, and Yudja

The Yawalapiti (also Jaulapiti, Yaulapiti, or Yawalapití) are an Indigenous tribe in the Amazonian Basin of Brazil. The name is also spelled Iaualapiti in Portuguese. The current village Yawalapiti is situated more to the south, between the Tuatuari and Kuluene River. Their population in 2011 was 156, down from a 2010 population of 237 (2010) but up from a low of 25 in 1954.

The Yawalapiti live in the Xingu Indian Park, in Upper Xingu region along with Kiabi, Yudja and Suya tribes. The ways of life of these four tribes are quite similar despite having different languages. Their villages are situated around Lake Ipavu, which is six kilometres from the Kuluene River.

== Language ==
The Yawalapiti language is a Central Maipuran, part of the Maipuran language family, which are Arawakan languages. Yawalapiti is related to the Waurá and Mehináku languages.

== Villages ==
Typical of Upper Xingu tribes, the Yawalapiti village is circular with communal houses surrounding a square (uikúka) cleared of vegetation. In the center of the square is the men's house, frequented only by men, where the sacred flutes are stored and played. It is in this house, or at nearby riverbanks, that the men congregate to talk in the twilight and paint themselves for ceremonies.

The men's house is similar to the residential houses. It only has one or two doors, always smaller than those of residences, which face the center square. The flutes are hung in the beams and during the day they may be played only in the house's interior; at night (after the women have retired) the men can play the flutes in the patio.

== History ==
The first historical contact between the Yawalapiti and Europeans occurred in 1887, when they had been visited by Karl von den Steinen's expedition. In this period, they were located in the high course of the Tuatuari river, in a region between lagoons and quagmires identified by the Yawalapiti as a small farm. The German anthropologist's impression of these Indians was that of poverty, a people who had insufficient food to offer visitors.

The tribe faced severe challenges during COVID-19: Watatakalu Yawalapiti, a Chief of the tribe, notably lost eight direct family members to the pandemic.

=== Traditional rituals ===
The Quarup or Kuarup ritual is performed to honour the dead tribe members. It is held together with neighbouring tribes.
