= Quarup =

Funeral ritual

The Quarup or Kuarup is the principal funeral ritual of the Indigenous people of the Xingu. It is a gathering of all neighbouring tribes to celebrate life, death, and rebirth. One of its central events is the presentation of all young girls who have experienced menarche since the last quarup and whose time has come to choose a partner, they tint their bodies and wear many ornaments and dance. It is a festival for the dead.
