= Ikpeng =

Ethnic group

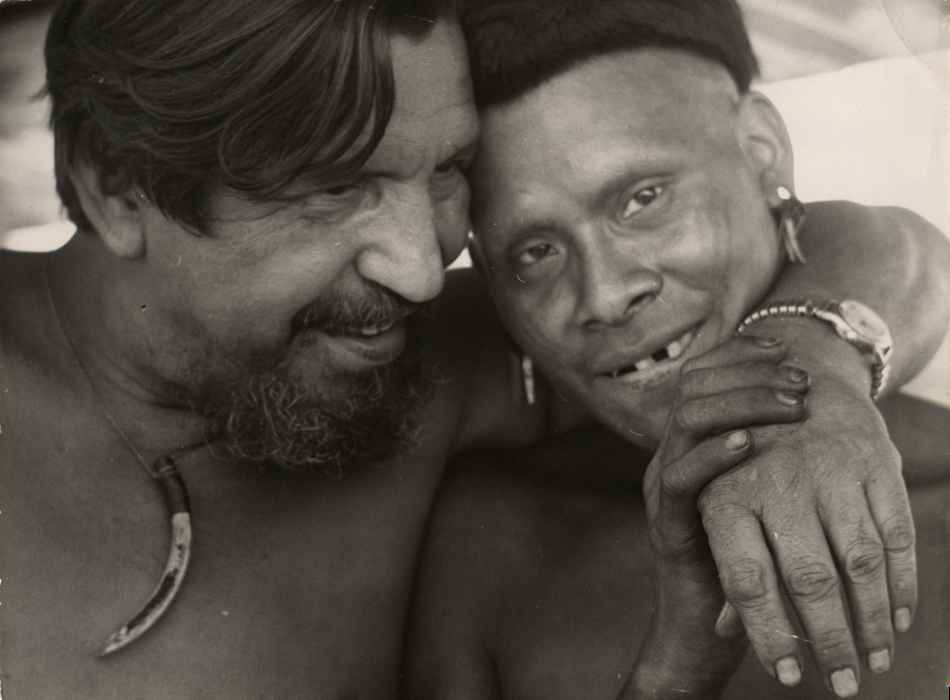

Total population
- 459 (2010)

Regions with significant populations
- Brazil (Mato Grosso)

Languages
- Ikpeng

Religion
- traditional tribal religion

Related ethnic groups
- Arara

The Ikpeng (also known as Txikāo) are an Indigenous community that now lives in the Xingu Indigenous Park in Mato Grosso, Brazil. They had a population of 459 in 2010, up from a low of 50 in 1969.

== Name ==
The Ikpeng are also called Txicão, Txikão, Txikân, Chicao, Tunuli, Tonore, Chicão, or Tchicão people.

== History ==
=== Early history ===
The Ikpeng were known to inhabit the same land as the Txipaya peoples, near the Iriri River, and they had a strong alliance with that group in times of war. One oral history traces the Ikpeng ancestral territory as far as the Jari River (Rodgers, 2013). By 1850, the Ikpeng were known to inhabit an area of converging rivers thought to be the Teles Pires-Juruena river basin (Menget & Troncarelli, 2003). Before 1900, the Ikpeng were at war with several polities, and even encountered settlers of European descent (2003). War and the colonization of the Teles Pires-Juruena basin pushed the Ikpeng across the Formosa Mountain formation and into the Upper Xingu Basin (2003). In 1960, the Ikpeng kidnapped two girls from the Wauja people, who brought a non-native disease (possibly influenza) to their tribe. The Wauja tribe also attacked the Ikpeng in an unsuccessful attempt to the get the two girls back, and as a result of disease and war, the population of the Ikpeng was cut in half.

=== Alleged gifts from the West ===
According to a story told to Scott Wallace by Sydney Possuelo, a few days before October 19, 1964 (the date of first contact), Orlando and Cláudio Villas-Boas had heard from native informants the Ikpeng were suffering from disease after a brutal enemy attack and that the Ikpeng shamans had failed to cure this disease. The informants told Orlando and Cláudio that it was not uncommon for the Ikpeng to kill their shamans if they fail to expel diseases. So, the brothers decided to act by airdropping gifts to the Ikpeng, who were startled by the presence of the airplane.

=== Contact and relocation ===
A few days after the alleged airdrop, on October 19, 1964, Orlando and Cláudio Villas-Boas encountered Ikpeng villages as they were flying over the Ronuro River in Mato Grosso (Pacheco, 2005). They lived near the Ronuro and Jabotá rivers and, when they were found malnourished and exposed to disease, they accepted resources and later relocation to the Xingu National Park in 1967 (Menget & Troncarelli, 2003). The Ikpeng dispersed for a short time, with different family groups living in different parts of the park, but later regrouped in the early 1970s near the Leonardo Villas-Boas Indigenous Post (2003). By the 1980s, they had moved to the middle Xingu region, and currently administer the Pavuru Indigenous Post, as well as the Ronuro Vigilance Post, which is near their traditional land on the Jabotá river (2003). From this post, they help defend the Xingu Park from illegal loggers and fishermen (Campetela, 1997). The Ikpeng made an expedition in 2002 to the Jabotá River to collect medicinal plants and shells. They currently seek to regain this territory (Menget & Troncarelli, 2003).

=== Schools ===
By the 1990s, the Ikpeng began to elaborate an education system within their community (Campetela, 1997). In 1994, Ikpeng teachers developed a form of writing with the help of linguists (Menget & Troncarelli, 2003). This was done through the Instituto Socioambiental’s Teacher Training program, which has allowed Ikpeng children to learn their own language alongside Portuguese in the Ikpeng School (2003). This school plays a central role in the project, and it is responsible for the creation of material and distribution of this material for Ikpeng communities within the Xingu Park (2003).

=== Subsistence ===
Ikpeng people are hunter-gatherers. They also fish and farm. Their primary crops include cotton, gourds, maize, manioc, and urucu.

== Involvement in the Video nas Aldeias/Video in the Villages project ==
Members of the Ikpeng community are involved with the Vídeo nas Aldeias project based in Brazil. Ikpeng filmmakers that have received their training through Vídeo nas Aldeias include Karané Ikpeng, Kumaré Ikpeng, and Natuyu Yuwipo Txicão. Natuyu Yuwipo Txicão is the first indigenous woman to join the Vídeo nas Aldeias project. Notable Ikpeng films include Marangmotxíngmo Mïrang: From the Ikpeng Children to the World (2001), Moyngo, the Dream of Maragareum (2000), and Pïrinop, My First Contact (2007).
