= Trumai people =

Indigenous people of the Amazon

Trumai
Total population
- 258 (2014)

Regions with significant populations
- Brazil (Mato Grosso)

Languages
- Trumai

Religion
- Traditional tribal religion

The Trumai (or Trumaí; native name: Ho kod ke) are an Indigenous people of Brazil. They currently reside within the Xingu Indigenous Park, in the state of Mato Grosso. They have a population of 258 in 2014. They were 97 in 2011 and 120 in 2006, up from a low of 26 in 1966.

The Trumai culture has been the topic of anthropological studies. The first was done by Buell Quain, who spent four months with the Trumai and gathered information on many aspects of the culture and community. More recently, De Vienne has conducted ethnographic studies on Trumai focussing on language and communication in the community, such as joking and ritual singing traditions.

== Background ==
The Trumai are one of the last groups to have settled on the upper Xingu River, moving there in the 19th century from the region between the Xingu and Araguaia Rivers, as a result of attacks from another people. They currently live in four villages in the Xingu Indigenous Park, Terra Preta, Boa Esperança, Steinen and Terra Nova, situated halfway from the Leonardo Villas-Bôas Post and the Diauarum Indigenous Post, where some families also live.

The Trumai are one of the ethnicities included in the standard cross-cultural sample.

They are considered the ones who introduced the jawari ritual ("hopep" in the Trumai language), that is, along with the kwarup, one of the most important inter-tribal festivals in the Upper Xingu cultural complex.

== Subsistence ==
The Trumai are farmers, growing primarily manioc, peppers, and beans.

== Language ==
The Trumai language is not closely related to other languages, and it is considered a language isolate. It is severely endangered, as children are becoming native speakers of Awetï, Suyá, or Portuguese.
