= Wauja =

Indigenous people of Brazil

Waura
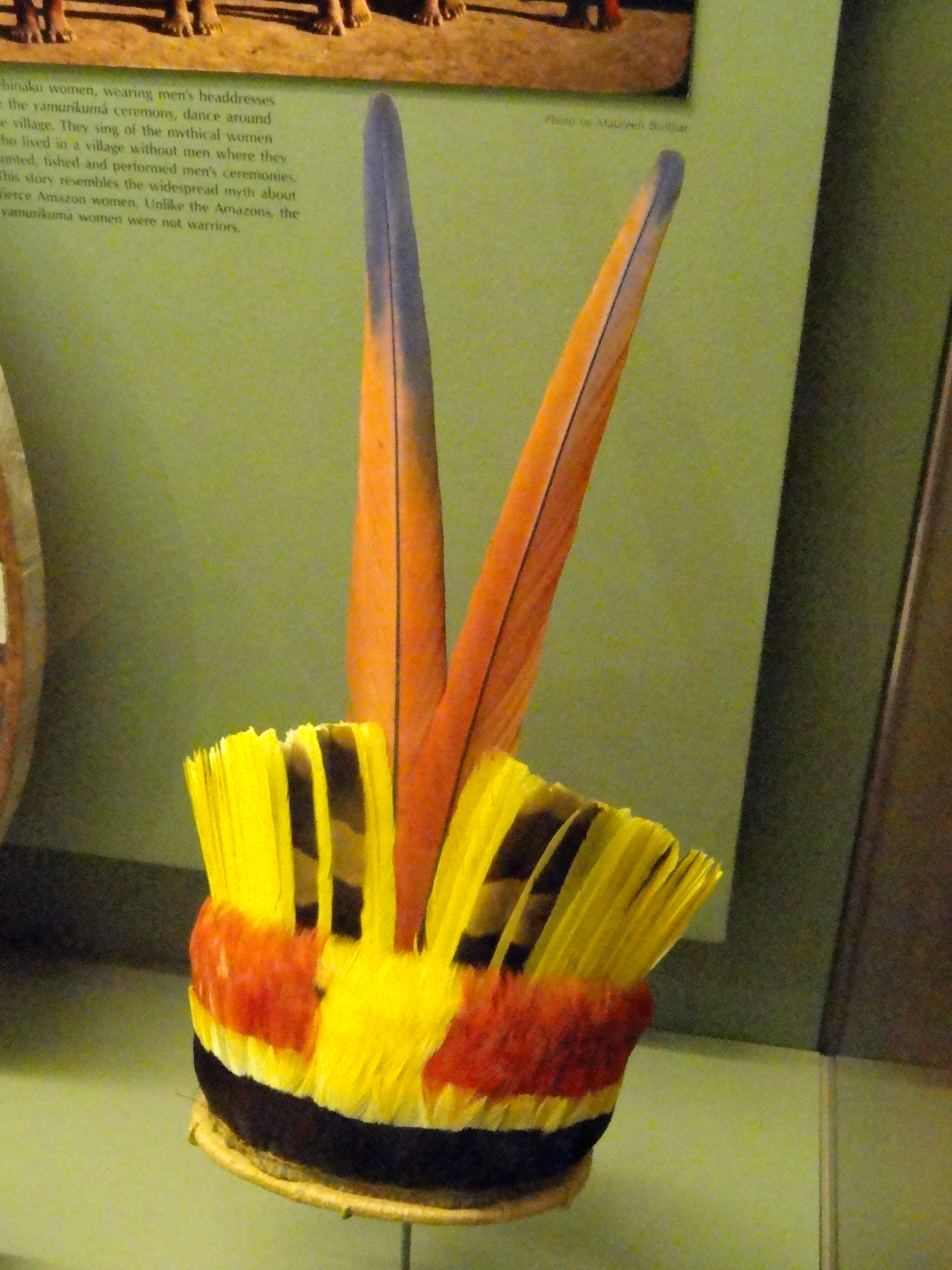
- Women's headress of the Waura on display at the American Museum of Natural History

Total population
- 487 (2010)

Regions with significant populations
- Brazil

Languages
- Waura

Related ethnic groups
- Mehinako

The Wauja or Waura (Waurá: Waujá; Portuguese: Uaurás) are an Indigenous people of Brazil. Their language, Waurá, is an Arawakan language. They live in the region near the Upper Xingu River, in the Xingu Indigenous Park in the state of Mato Grosso, and had a population of 487 in 2010.

== History ==
The Wauja and Mehinako, two Arawakan-speaking tribes native to the Upper Xingu River, are likely descendants of various tribes which came into the region in roughly the 9th or 10th century CE. Archaeological records going back to the time between 1000 and 1600 suggest that the people living in the region were mostly sedentary, with relatively large communities. These villages were built around a central plaza, and were defended with ditches and palisades. Archaeological evidence from the region suggests a strong relationship with a band of Aruak tribes stretching from the Upper Xingu to modern day Bolivia. It is unknown what sort of relationship the Aruak-speaking people of the Upper Xingu River had with other, Carib-speaking tribes, although the current multiethnic order in the region was in place by the 18th century.

German ethnologist Karl von den Steinen was the first European to record the existence of the Wauja tribe in 1884. He received hints that the tribe might exist (under the name Vaurá) by other indigenous peoples that he encountered on his expedition. He discovered exactly where they existed when given a map of the region by members of the Suyá tribe.

== Village ==
The largest Wauja settlement is the village of Piyulaga. The village is centred on a square containing the kuwakuho ("house of the flutes); the surrounding residential homes are oval-shaped and made out of imperata brasiliensis, a type of tropical grass. Political meetings, rituals and festivals occur on the square. Traditionally, extended families consisting of blood relations resided in the same homes, though in modern times, most residences house one or two couples and their children.

== Leadership ==
Leadership among the Wauja consists of the chieftain of the household (amunaw-mona) and chieftain of the village (amunaw-iyajo). A male leader is known as an amunaw, while a female leader is a amuluneju. To become amunaw-iyajo, it is necessary to be descended, through either parent, from a previous chieftain. The amunaw-iyajo is confirmed through a ritual called pohoka. A village can have no more than two chieftains, with the tradition being that they are the eldest son and the second son, with the eldest son being the main chieftain (putakananku wekeho).

== Work ==
Traditionally, men are responsible for weaving baskets and collecting clay for the construction of ceramics. Women are responsible for grinding shells to mix clay, and for manually shaping clay pieces and painting them with pigments obtained from plants and fruits. Wauja pottery is often sold in the cities and is also used as a bargaining chip with other villages.

== Coming of age ==
Boys come of age when they turn 10 years old. The male initiation ritual, pohoka, in which the boy's ear is pierced, usually occurs during August. During the period of the pohoka, the boy cannot eat fish, and his parents and godparents cannot have sexual intercourse. Flutes are played for the preceding day, and the night before the piercing, villagers sing until dawn.

Girls come of age when they begin menstruating, though the female initiation ritual, kajatapá, is only done on girls who are to become amuluneju (female leader). Singing is held throughout the day, and nearby villages are invited to attend. Guests go fishing before returning to the village to dance. There are fights between men and women, before the singing resumes. Kajatapá concludes when the older women of the village put a cord, uluri, on the initiated girls.

== Festivals ==
Akãi occurs between September and November when souari nuts begin falling from the trees. Men collect wood to create a matapu, an instrument which is created and stored in the kuwakuho, where women are forbidden from entering. When the matapu is played, women remain in their homes with the door closed so they cannot see it. Once the noise ends, people leave their homes and bring food to the central square. After eating, men sing kuri and settle disputes. The festival lasts five days.

Lamurikuma takes place during the dry season at a date decided by the amunaw-iyajo. Neighbouring villages are invited to take part. Women wear headdresses, armbands and body paint and sing together. During lamurikuma it is traditional for women to express their displeasure with men in the village square, and during the celebrations, women can often take part in fights.

== Religion ==
The Wauja believe in shamanism with a central tenet being that the human soul is fragmented and susceptible to disease from the apapaatai, dangerous non-human spirits who can also provide some benefits for people in some circumstances. Diseases caused by the apapaatai can only be treated by shamans, who are split into three groups: the yakapá, who identifies the apapaatai or sorcerer who caused the disease; the pukaiwekeho, who sings healing songs; and the yatamá, responsible for tobacco smoke (hoká) that can cause healing. Men and women can both be shamans, though women are unable to reach the highest training. Villages without shamans are able to use shamans in other villages.

For more serious diseases caused by apapaatai, a feast called pukai is held, funded by the patient. Once cured, the patient must hold a pukai repeatedly for a set amount of time determined by the shaman to appease the apapaatai.

=== Eschatology ===
The Wauja believe that after death, the soul goes to the land of the dead (ywuejokupoho) where they must walk along a path (yakunapu) to the ietula tree. During the journey, they are protected by apapaatai who allied themselves to them when they were alive. At the tree, the soul must climb a ladder (mapi'ya) alone. The soul of someone who dies in an accident goes to Tamalaipoho, a village in ywuejokupoho, where they can be visited by shamans.
