= Aweti =

Ethnic group of Xingu River, Brazil

Total population
- 192 (2014)

Regions with significant populations
- Brazil (Mato Grosso)

Languages
- Aweti, Kamayurá, Portuguese

Religion
- Traditional tribal religion, Christianity

The Aweti people are a group of Indigenous Brazilians living in the Xingu Indigenous Park, close to the headwaters of the Xingu River in Brazil. The Aweti inhabit two villages in the region. One is called Tazu’jyretam, and the other is unnamed. Tazu’jyretam is the main village of the Aweti people, and has been inhabited since at least the 19th century. Tazu’jyretam also has a small port. Both of these villages are located in an area between the Curisevo and Tuatuarí rivers, which feed into the Xingu further upstream. Their population was 196 in 2011, up from 140 in 2006. The Aweti people live in a multilingual area due to various indigenous people settling there from various regions. In search of refuge many people have relocated to the reserve as a result of European colonialism.

== Name ==
The Aweti are also known as the Arauine, Arauite, Aueti, Aueto, Auiti, Awetö, Awytyza, Anumaniá, Auetö, or Enumaniá people.

== History ==
The Aweti people likely formed from several other tribes which entered the Xingu region in the 17th or 18th century. It wasn't until the late 19th century that the Aweti and other tribes in the region were documented by European explorers, coming from Germany. Although there was not much communication between the Aweti and European settlers from then onward for several decades, the brief expeditions into the jungle from explorers were enough to introduce diseases into the community to which the Aweti and their neighbors had no acquired immunity. By the time of the 1950 census, the Aweti counted only 23 people. Despite this, the Aweti did not become extinct or merge with other tribes like some of their neighbors.

When the Xingu Indigenous Park was set up in the 1960s, the Aweti population recovered significantly, to 176 people in 2010. This was a result, largely, of better medical care being offered to the people in the region by the Brazilian government. Contact with the outside world increased as well, however, threatening the native language and culture of the Aweti.

At some point after the year 2000, the second Aweti village was set up by an extended family and some of their allies who wished to split from the main Aweti tribe. This included some 35 people, causing the population of the main village to drop from 125 people to 90.

== Culture ==
Aweti villages are built with several huts surrounding a central plaza, which is used for rituals, including funeral rites. This is characteristic of villages built in the area around the Xingu headwaters. A men's hut is also located in the center of the village, and is used for holding ritual flutes which are not allowed to be seen by women.

Chiefs, decided by heredity, lead the Aweti villagers and serve as diplomats with other upper Xinguan groups. Currently, the chief of the Aweti is a man named Yalakumin.

Inter-tribal trade and rituals among the people of the upper Xingu are common, with the Aweti trading goods such as vegetable salts and hammocks, made from Burití palm trees. The Huka-huka wrestling contest is a popular intertribal sport. Many tribe members from the upper Xinguan cultural groups also choose to find husbands or wives from other tribes.

== Language ==
The Aweti language is a member of the Tupian language family, although it is unique and distinctive. Because of contact with outsiders, however, some Aweti tribal members can also speak Portuguese, the majority language of Brazil. Children are educated in Portuguese at an Aweti tribal school.

In the new village created in the Aweti tribal area, many people, especially younger individuals, speak Kamayurá better than Aweti. All of the people in the new village speak at least one language other than Aweti.

== Subsistence ==
The Aweti fish, hunt, and farm. Their primary crops are maize and manioc.
