= Nahukuá =

Total population
- 146

Regions with significant populations
- Brazil

Languages
- Cariban (Amonap)

The Nahukuá are members of a small, Indigenous ethnic group in the upper Xingu River area of Brazil. Their population was 146, as of 2010, making them the smallest group in the region.

== History ==
When the Nahukuá people were first encountered by German explorers in the late 19th century, they were initially grouped with two other tribes living in the region (the Kalapalo and Kuikuro, rather than recognized as their own unique group. Another group of later explorers only mentioned the Nahukuá in passing, speculating about the origins of the Nahukuá people. These explorers, led by a man named Max Schmidt, believed that, because of the Cariban ancestry of the Nahukuá, they were probably immigrants to the region, hailing originally from southwestern Guiana.

Early explorers noted that the Nahukuá had several villages along the Kurisevo and Kuluene rivers. By the 1940s, however, the population of the Nahukuá people had been reduced to only 28. Although the population did rise slightly in the ensuing years, a measles epidemic decimated populations again in the 1950s. By 1954, some believed that the Nahukuá may already have been extinct. At some point after 1948, low Nahukuá populations caused the ethnic group to disband its last existing village at the time. In the 1960s, at the encouragement of the Villas-Bôas brothers, the Nahukuá created a new village to a spot closer to the Kalapalo people. This village was eventually abandoned, due to superstition regarding a murder, which the Nahukuá attributed to sorcery.

In 1977, a new Nahukuá village was set up on the shore of Kuluene river. Nahukuá populations, which had been increasing since the introduction of proper modern healthcare to the upper Xingu River area in the 1960s, continued to increase after the foundation of this new village.
