= Kamayurá =

Indigenous people of Brazil

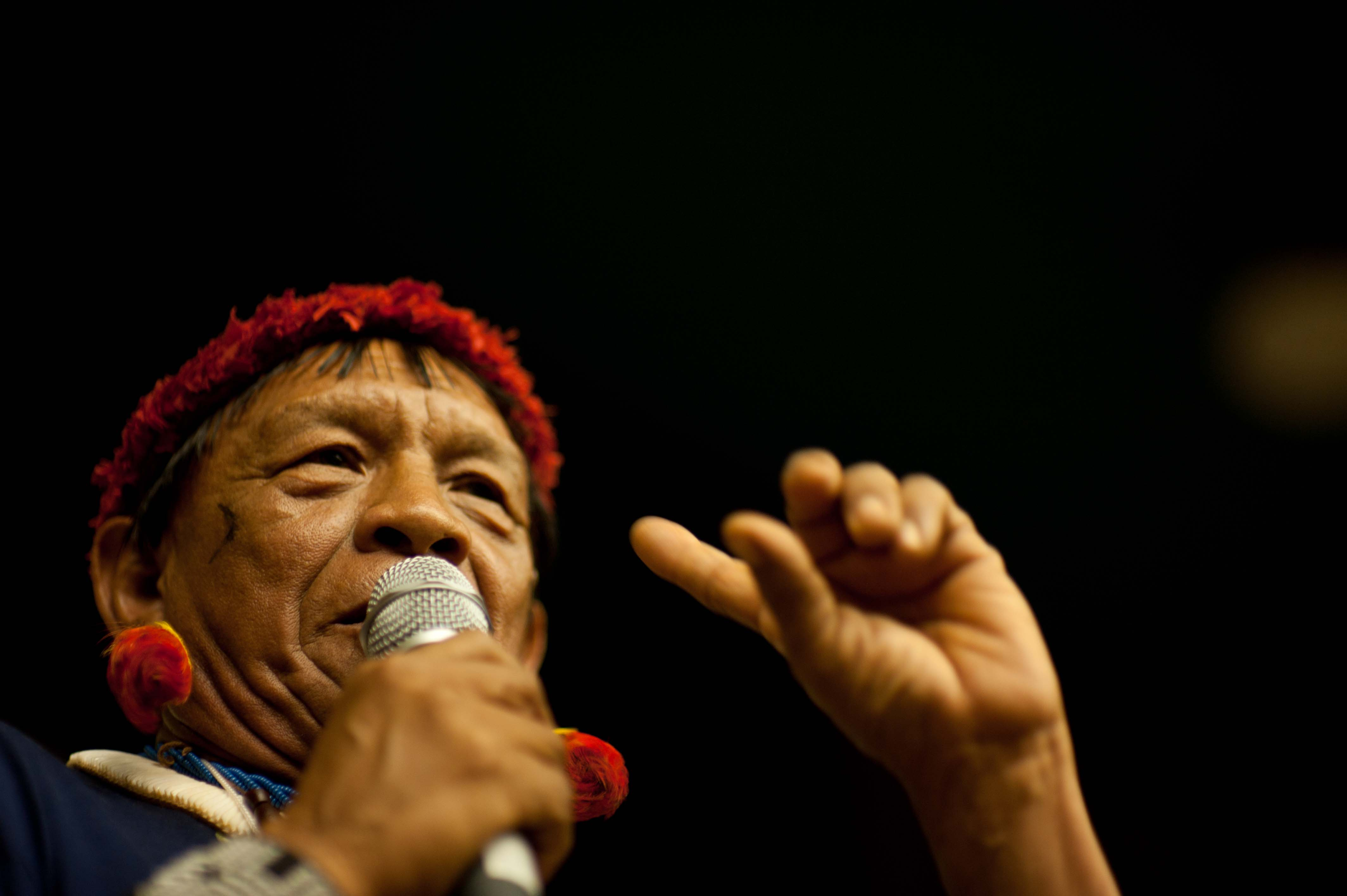
- Maniwa Kamayurá, traditional Kamayurá architect

Total population
- 467 (2011)

Regions with significant populations
- Brazil (Mato Grosso)

Languages
- Kamayurá

Religion
- traditional tribal religion

The Kamayurá are an Indigenous tribe in the Amazonian Basin of Brazil. Their name is also spelled Kamayura and Kamaiurá; it means "a raised platform to keep meat, pots and pans." The Kamayurá language belongs to the Tupi–Guarani family.

The Kamayurá live in the Upper Xingu region along with Kiabi, Yudja and Suya tribes. The ways of life of these four tribes are quite similar despite having different languages. Their villages are situated around Lake Ipavu, which is six kilometres from the Kuluene River. Much like other small Indigenous cultures around the globe, the Kamayurá are struggling to adapt to the effects of deforestation and climate change.

== Population ==
In 2002 there were an estimated 355 people. Now there are about 544 (2010). Their numbers had made a good recovery from an all-time low of 94 people recorded in 1954, the previous reduction in numbers due to the measles epidemic. The total population was 264 when adventurer Karl von den Steinen visited the area in the 1880s.

== Description of villages ==
The Kamayurá village comprises a round roof that is decorated with sape grass (Imperata brasiliensis) and the ‘house of the flutes’(Tapuwi) contain important flute (jakui) instruments that can only be played by the men. In front of that house there is a meeting area where the men discuss fishing trips or plan festivals and so on.

The house is generally dark and is where the women and children dwell. The rainforest surround the entire village and private gardens can also be found.

== History ==
The region was declared a national park by the Brazilian authorities in 1961, intended to prevent further intrusions and spread of deadly epidemics to locals. The Kamayurá people currently live near other indigenous peoples, namely the Kuikuro and Kalapalo, for example, in Upper Xingu. In regards to contact with non-indigenous people, this was first seen in 1884 with the exploration of Karl Von den Stein. At this time the Kamayurá were situated on the banks of the Lake Ipavu. Karl Von den Stein was a German explorer, and with his exploration opened up opportunities for other explorers to pass through the region of which the Kamayurá were situated. In 1942 the Federal Agency was created as well as the Central Brazil Foundation, this opened roads and established camps in the area which the Kamayurá were living. These open roads and camps directly affected the Kamayurá as contact with non-indigenous people continued. In 1961 Funai turned the territory the Kamayurá inhabited, into what is today known as the National Park.

== Social organisation ==
The Kamayurá society comprises several villages, a group of brothers being the owner of each household. They decide what tasks and productive activities should be conducted each day by its members.

After marriage the husband moves and lives in the wife’s parents’ house. Strong alliances can be established through marriages.

The genders are separated shortly after puberty. The boys are taught how to hunt for food with an arrow, do hard labour, and create a basket. Wrestling is done daily which strengthens their muscles. They are also trained in combat and taught leadership skills so they are able to look after their own families later on. This segregation lasts for up to five years before returning.

The teenage girls during seclusion must learn how to weave mats, and perform many basic everyday household duties. After a few years they become ready for marriage, they are given a new name and their ears are pierced. The girls also learn how to dance and look after the family.

== Ceremonies and Rituals ==
There are many ceremonies and rituals of the Kamayurá people. Some of these rituals are: the feast of the dead, and the celebration feast of the warriors. The aim of these rituals is to bring together the various ethnic groups of the Upper Xingu area to celebrate the life of the deceased.

== Trade ==
Bows and arrows (made with high quality materials), snail-shell belts and ceramic pots are traded with other tribes. Fish nets, canoes, flutes and hammocks are made as specialised goods.

== Diet ==
The traditional Kamayura diet generally consists of fish, beiju, porridge, pepper and bananas. Fish is the main source of protein. Birds are hunted in the rain forest while wild berries are gathered as the main food supplement. Most fur-bearing animals are considered taboo. Eagles can be a supplement for fish. Honey is also collected. Manioc is harvested and processed in beiju and a sweet soup called mohete.
