= Dorasque =

Dorasque may be,

- Dorasque people
- Dorasque language
