= Guató =

Guató can refer to:

- Guató people, an indigenous group living in Brazil and Bolivia
- Guató language, a language isolate used by the Guató
