= Indigenous peoples of the North American Southwest =

Regional culture of native peoples in southwestern North America

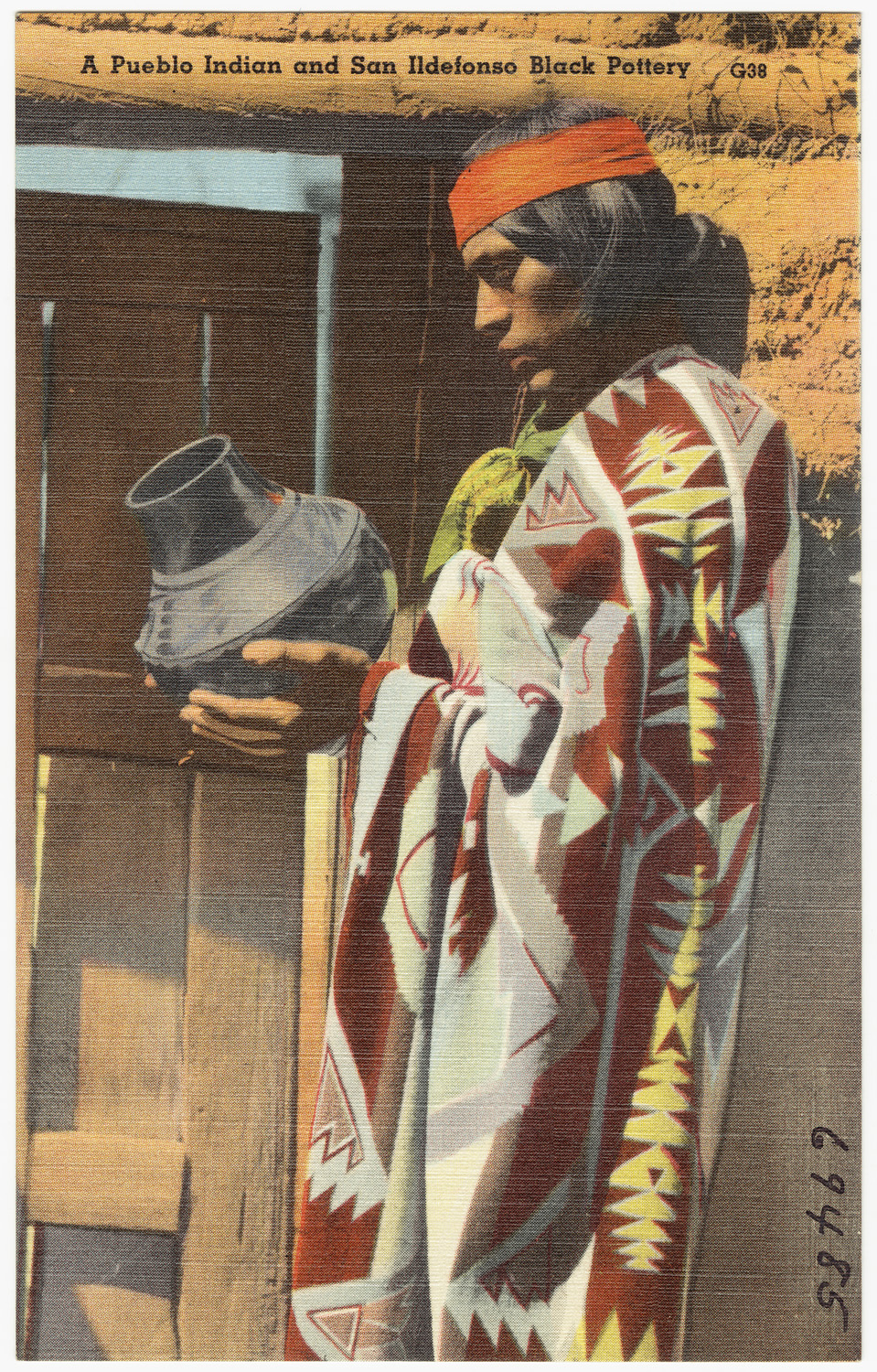
Puebloan from San Ildefonso Pueblo, New Mexico

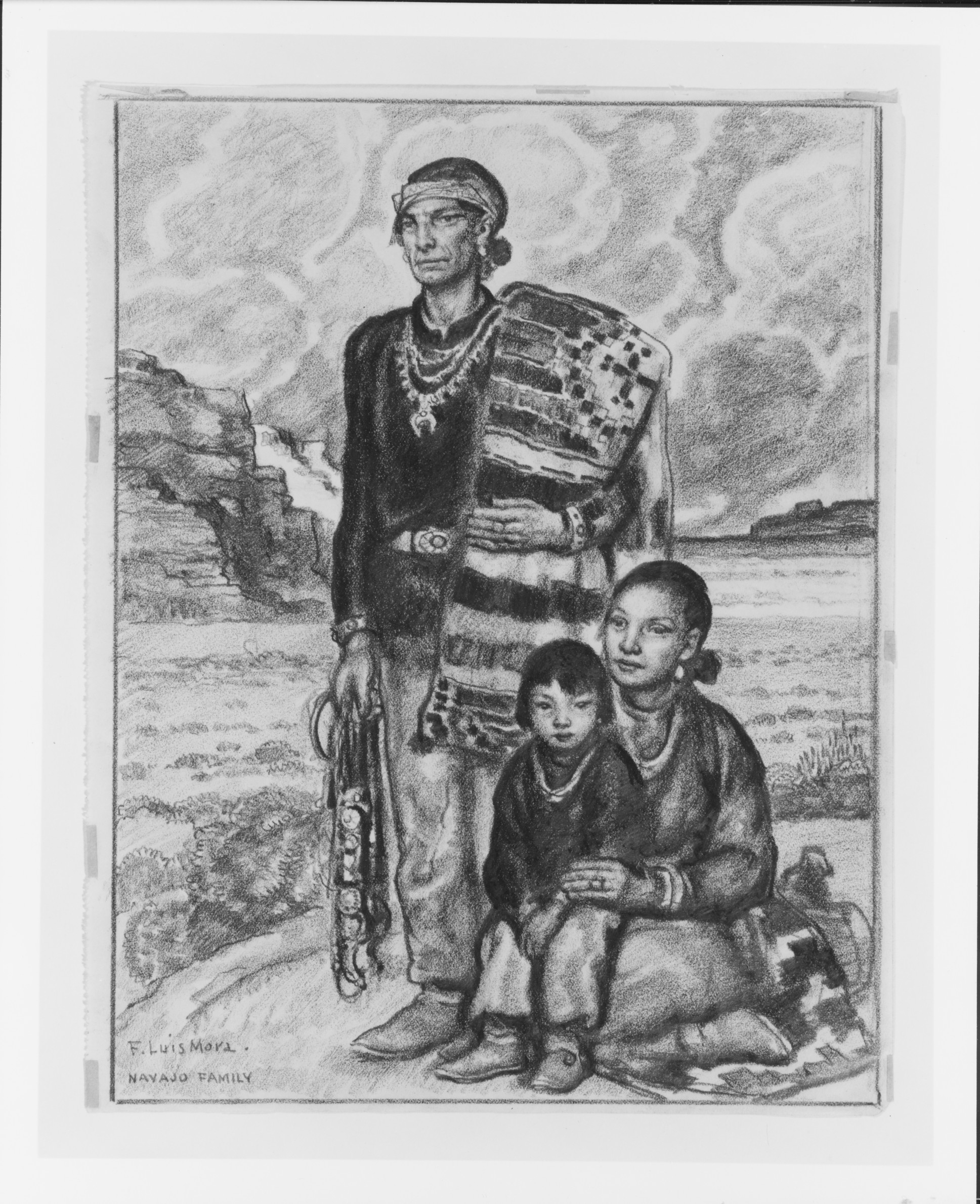
Navajo family

The Indigenous peoples of the North American Southwest are those in the current states of Colorado, Arizona, New Mexico, Utah, and Nevada in the western United States, and the states of Sonora and Chihuahua in northern Mexico. An often quoted statement from Erik Reed (1666) defined the Greater Southwest culture area as extending north to south from Durango, Mexico to Durango, Colorado and east to west from Las Vegas, Nevada to Las Vegas, New Mexico. Other names sometimes used to define the region include "American Southwest", "Northern Mexico", "Chichimeca", and "Oasisamerica/Aridoamerica". This region has long been occupied by hunter-gatherers and agricultural people.

Many contemporary cultural traditions exist within the Greater Southwest, including Yuman-speaking peoples inhabiting the Colorado River valley, the uplands, and Baja California, O'odham peoples of Southern Arizona and northern Sonora, and the Pueblo peoples of Arizona and New Mexico. In addition, the Apache and Navajo peoples, whose ancestral roots lie in the Athabaskan-speaking peoples in Canada, entered the Southwest during the 14th and 15th century and are a major modern presence in the area.

== List of Indigenous peoples of the North American Southwest ==
- Ak Chin, Arizona
- Akimel O'odham (formerly Pima), Arizona
- Southern Athabaskan (Apache)
  - Chiricahua Apache, New Mexico and Oklahoma
  - Jicarilla Apache, New Mexico
  - Lipan Apache, New Mexico, Oklahoma, and Texas
  - Mescalero Apache, New Mexico
  - Navajo (Diné), Arizona, New Mexico, and southern Utah
  - San Carlos Apache, Arizona
  - Tonto Apache, Arizona
  - Western Apache (Coyotero Apache), Arizona
  - White Mountain Apache, Arizona
- Cocopa, Arizona, northern Mexico
- Halchidhoma, Arizona and California
- Hualapai, Arizona
- Havasupai, Arizona
- Hohokam, formerly Arizona
- Maricopa, Arizona
- Mojave (Mohave), Arizona, California, and Nevada
- Pueblo peoples, Arizona, New Mexico, Western Texas
  - Ancestral Pueblo, formerly Arizona, Colorado, New Mexico, Utah
  - Hopi-Tewa (Arizona Tewa, Hano), Arizona, joined the Hopi during the Pueblo Revolt
  - Hopi, Arizona
  - Keres people, New Mexico
    - Acoma Pueblo, New Mexico
    - Cochiti Pueblo, New Mexico
    - Santo Domingo Pueblo (Kewa Pueblo), New Mexico
    - Laguna Pueblo, New Mexico
    - San Felipe Pueblo, New Mexico
    - Santa Ana Pueblo, New Mexico
    - Zia Pueblo, New Mexico
  - Tewa people, New Mexico
    - Nambé Pueblo, New Mexico
    - Ohkay Owingeh (formerly San Juan Pueblo), New Mexico
    - Pojoaque Pueblo, New Mexico
    - San Ildefonso Pueblo, New Mexico
    - Tesuque Pueblo, New Mexico
    - Santa Clara Pueblo, New Mexico
  - Tiwa people, New Mexico
    - Isleta Pueblo, New Mexico
    - Picuris Pueblo, New Mexico
    - Sandia Pueblo, New Mexico
    - Taos Pueblo, New Mexico
    - Ysleta del Sur Pueblo (Tigua Pueblo), southwest Texas
    - Piro Pueblo, New Mexico
  - Tompiro, formerly New Mexico
  - Towa people
    - Jemez Pueblo (Walatowa), New Mexico
    - Pecos (Ciquique) Pueblo, New Mexico
  - Zuni people (Ashiwi), New Mexico
- Quechan (Yuma), Arizona and California
- Tohono O'odham, Arizona and Mexico
  - Qahatika, Arizona
- Walapai, Arizona
- Yaqui (Yoeme), Arizona, Sonora (also Aridoamerica)
- Yavapai, Arizona
  - Tolkapaya (Western Yavapai), Arizona
  - Yavapé (Northwestern Yavapai), Arizona
  - Kwevkapaya (Southeastern Yavapai), Arizona
  - Wipukpa (Northeastern Yavapai), Arizona

=== List of Indigenous descendants and related peoples ===
- Genízaros, descendants of Comanches, Utes, Kiowas, Apaches, Navajos, and Hispanos taken as slaves by one another.
- Hispanos, many have mestizo ancestry, particularly in New Mexico
  - Californios, California (The Californias)
  - Hispanos of New Mexico (Santa Fe de Nuevo México)
  - Tejanos (particularly those near Ysleta del Sur Pueblo, Texas)
- Chicanos as New Mexican "Hispanos" most descend from Native people many from Southwestern and Northern Mexican Indigenous groups.

== History ==
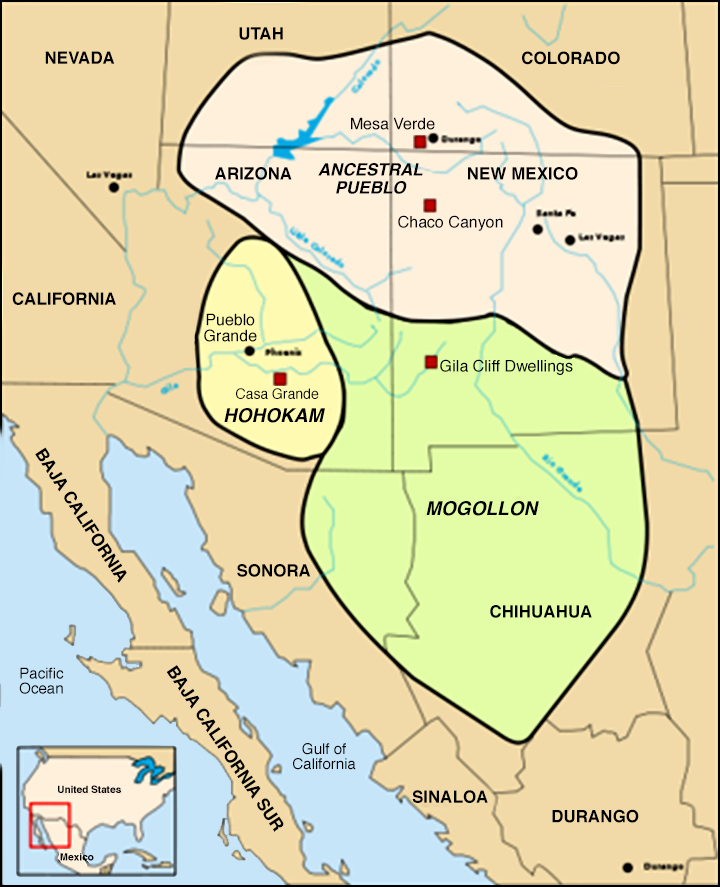
A map showing the extent of three major cultures within the American Southwest and Northern Mexico with modern borders to provide geographical context

The Pre-Columbian culture of the American Southwest and Northern Mexico evolved into three major archaeological culture areas, sometimes referred to as Oasisamerica.

- The Ancestral Pueblo peoples, or Anasazi, culture was centered around the present-day Four Corners area. Their distinctive pottery and dwelling construction styles emerged in the area around 750 CE. Ancestral Pueblo peoples are renowned for the construction of and cultural achievement present at Pueblo Bonito and other sites in Chaco Canyon, as well as Mesa Verde, Aztec Ruins, and Salmon Ruins.
- The Hohokam tradition, centered on the middle Gila River and lower Salt River drainage areas, and extending into the southern Sonoran Desert, is believed to have emerged in approximately 200 CE. These people lived in smaller settlement clusters than their neighbors, and built extensive irrigation canals for a wide range of agricultural crops. There is evidence the Hohokam had far-reaching trade routes with ancient Mesoamerican cultures to the south, and show cultural influences from these southerners.
- Mogollon peoples /moʊɡəˈjoʊn/ lived in the southwest from approximately 200 CE until sometime between 1450 and 1540 CE. Mogollon archaeological sites are found in the Gila Wilderness, Mimbres River Valley, along the Upper Gila river, Paquime and Hueco Tanks, an area of low mountains between the Franklin Mountains to the west and the Hueco Mountains to the east.

In addition, three distinct minor cultures inhabited the eastern, western, and northern extremes of the area. From 1200 CE into the historic era a people collectively known as the La Junta Indians lived at the junction of the Conchos River and Rio Grande on the border of Texas and Mexico. Between 700 and 1550 CE, the Patayan culture inhabited parts of modern-day Arizona, California and Baja California. The Fremont culture inhabited sites in what is now Utah and parts of Nevada, Idaho and Colorado from 700 to 1300 CE.

== Material Culture ==
Agriculture in the Southwest was based on the cultivation of maize, beans, squash and sunflower seeds. The Tepary bean Phaseolus acutifolius has been a staple food of Native peoples in the Southwest for thousands of years on account of their tolerance of drought conditions. They require wet soil to germinate but then prefer dry conditions, so they were generally grown on floodplains that would dry out after heavy rains.

Foraging for wild foods also played a major role in the ancient diet of Southwestern peoples. For example, the fruit and seeds of the Saguaro cactus were collected and eaten both fresh and dried, and made into preserves and drinks by tribes such as the Tohono O'odham and Pima. The flower buds of the Cholla cactus have also been collected and roasted in clay lined pits. Another important food for Indigenous peoples living in mountainous areas of the Southwest are the seeds of the Pinyon pine, known as "pine nuts" or "piñóns." The nuts are traditionally a vital source of protein in the winter for the Ute and Paiute peoples.

The agave plant has historically been a vital food source, useful to Indigenous people in many ways. Agave hearts can be roasted and relished for their sweetness, and dried agave eaten during the winter months. The tough fibers of agave are used in making baskets and mats. In addition, agave is famously used for distilled spirits such as tequila and mezcal.

Indigenous peoples of the region have traditionally raised turkey and hunted deer, antelope and rabbit. After European contact they began to keep sheep, goats and cattle.

== Society and culture ==
Contemporary Pueblo Indians continue to be organized on a clan basis for pueblo activities and curing ceremonies. The clans of the eastern Pueblos are organized into the Summer people and the Winter people (Tanoans) or as the Turquoise people and the Squash people. The western Puebloans are organized into several matrilineal lineages and clans. Many Pueblo peoples continue to practice the kachina (katsina) religion.

== See also ==
- Indigenous peoples of Mexico
- Native Americans in the United States
