= Taposa =

Historical Indigenous tribe from Mississippi, U.S.

Total population
- extinct as a tribe, may have merged into Chakchiuma

Regions with significant populations
- United States (Mississippi)

Languages
- likely a Muskogean language

Religion
- Indigenous religion

Related ethnic groups
- Chakchiuma, Ibitoupa, and Tiou

The Taposa were an Indigenous people of the Southeastern Woodlands from what is now Mississippi in the United States.

The Taposa were a small tribe like their neighbors, the Ibitoupa and Chakchiuma, who all lived along the upper Yazoo River between the larger, more powerful Chickasaw and Choctaw.

== History ==
=== 17th century ===
The Taposa were first written about by French colonist Pierre Le Moyne d'Iberville in 1699.

=== 18th century ===
Baron de Crenay's 1733 map of Louisiana includes a Taposa settlement near the Chakchiuma. Another neighboring tribe, the Ibitoupa may have merged into the Taposa in 1722. The Taposa ultimately allied with the Chickasaw.

== Name ==
The original meaning of the name "Taposa" has been lost.
