= Dorasque language =

Extinct Chibchan language of Panama

Dorasque
- Native to: Panama, Costa Rica
- Ethnicity: Dorasque
- Extinct: 1882
- Language family: Chibchan: Isthmic; Doracic; Dorasque
- Dialects: Chumulu; Gualaca; Chánguena ?

Language codes
- ISO 639-3: None (mis)
- Glottolog: dora1242

Dorasque is an extinct Chibchan language formerly spoken by the Dorasque in the territory between the plains of Barú and Changuinola to the north, the banks of the Chiriquí Viejo and Piedras rivers to the south, Chiriquí to the east, and Burica and Térraba to the west (between the present-day province of Puntarenas in Costa Rica and the western departments of Panama). Its dialects were Chumulu and Gualaca. It is closely related to Chánguena (Chánguina), which is considered by some authors to be variants of the same language. The last Dorasque died in 1882 (Pinart 1890).

== Bibliography ==
- Alphonse Louis Pinart, Vocabulario castellano-dorasque, dialectos chumulu, gualaca y changuina Vocabulario Castellano-dorasque, Dialectos Chumulu, Gualaca y Changuina, 1890
- Umaña, Adolfo Constenla (1991). Las lenguas del área intermedia: introducción a su estudio areal. Editorial Universidad de Costa Rica.
