= Jibito =

The Jibito are an indigenous people of Peru. They first met with the Franciscans monks in 1676 in the forest near the Huallaga River, in what is now Peru's Loreto Province. After their conversion to Catholicism, they settled in villages on the western bank of the river.

== See also ==
- South American Indigenous people
- Hibito–Cholon languages
