= Yasika =

Yasika was a Misumalpan (Matagalpan) Indian tribe that lived in the highlands of Nicaragua, río Yasica, Matagalpa Department. Yasica is the name of a region that divides Matagalpa to the Mayangna territory in the so-called Caribbean Coast.
