= Movere =

The Mové, also called Movere, Western Guaymi, or Ngäbere, are a Chibchan (Dorasque-Guaymi) speaking people in Panama (150,000) and Costa Rica (4,300). This tribe, like the Murire (Eastern Guaymi), is a division of the Guaymi. They are further subdivided into the Valiente.

The Mové live in the rainforest as hunters and gatherers of wild plants. Among their crafts are basket weaving and pottery.
