= Patángoro people =

Indigenous people of Colombia

The Patángoro, also called the Pantágoro, were a Native American people of Colombia who lived on the banks of the Magdalena River. Instead of class strata, they were grouped by clans that practiced matrilineal succession. Artificial cranial deformation was a feature of Patángoro society.
