= Amaicha =

Diaguita subgroup

The Amaichas were one of the 16 recognized Diaguitan communities in the province of Tucumán in northwestern Argentina.
