= Sikiana =

Total population
- ~83

Regions with significant populations
- Brazil: 33 (1986)
- Suriname: 50 (2001)

Languages
- Sikiana, Tiriyó

Religion
- traditional tribal religion

Related ethnic groups
- Salumá

The Sikiana are an Indigenous people, living in Brazil, Suriname, and Venezuela.

The Sikiana in Brazil live between the Cafuini River and headwaters of the Turuna and Itapi close to border with Suriname. The group in Suriname lives in Kwamalasamutu. The group in Venezuela is probably extinct.

The 1916 Encyclopaedia of the Dutch West Indies placed the Sikiana at the Trombetas River in Brazil, and said that they had a close relationship with the Salumá and the Tiriyó.

== Name ==
The Sikiana are also called Chikena, Chiquena, Chiquiana, Shikiana, Sikiâna, Sikiyana, Sikiána, Sikïiyana, Tshikiana, Xikiyana, or Xikujana people.

== Language ==
The Sikiana language belongs to the Carib language family. The people in Suriname speak Tiriyó as a second language. Some Sikiana people in Venezuela speak the Tiriyó.
