= Yaminawá =

South American Indigenous people

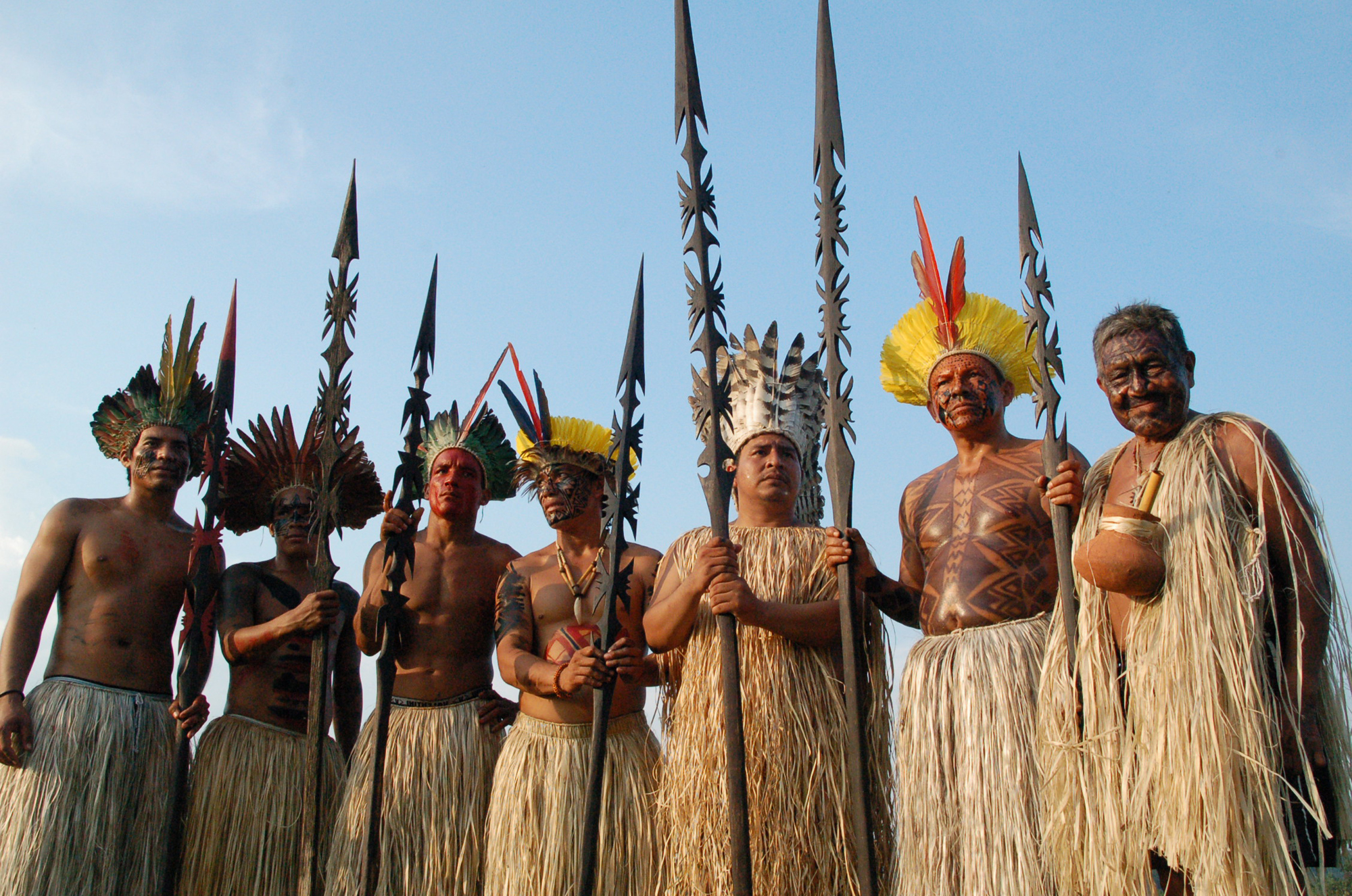

Total population
- 2,684 (Funasa, 2010)

Regions with significant populations
- Brazil (Acre), Peru, Bolivia

Languages
- Yaminawá, Panoan language family

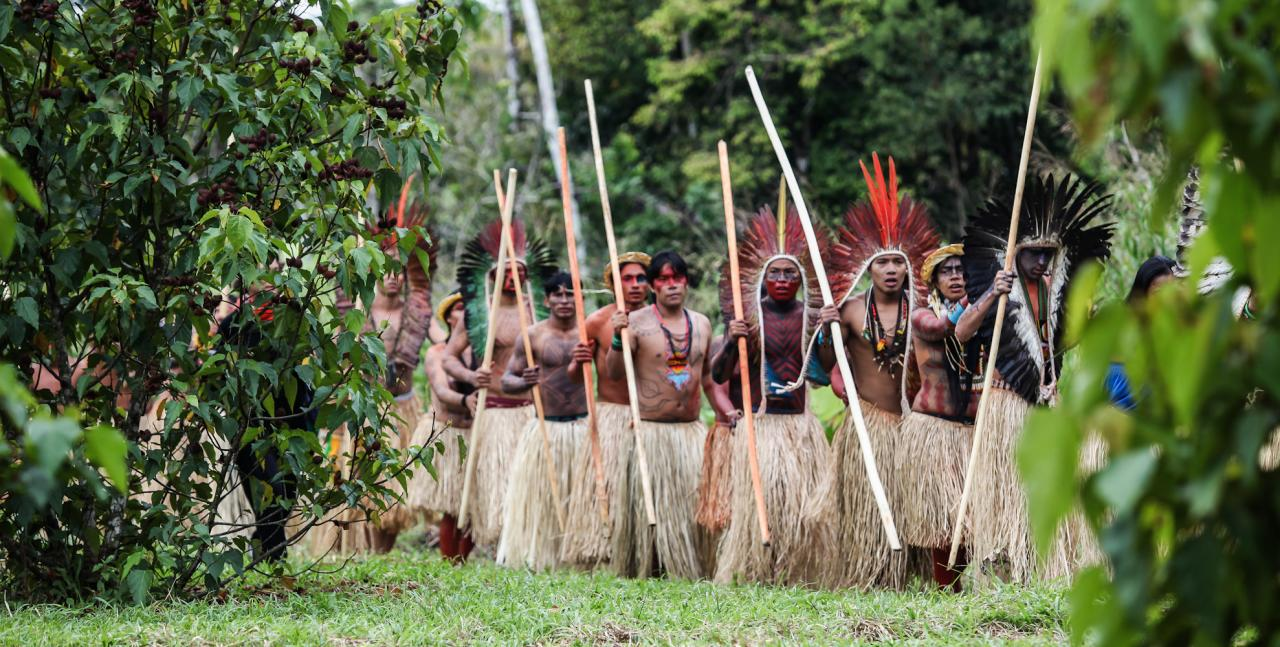
Mariri Yawanawá festivity exposes an active culture in the Brazilian Amazon

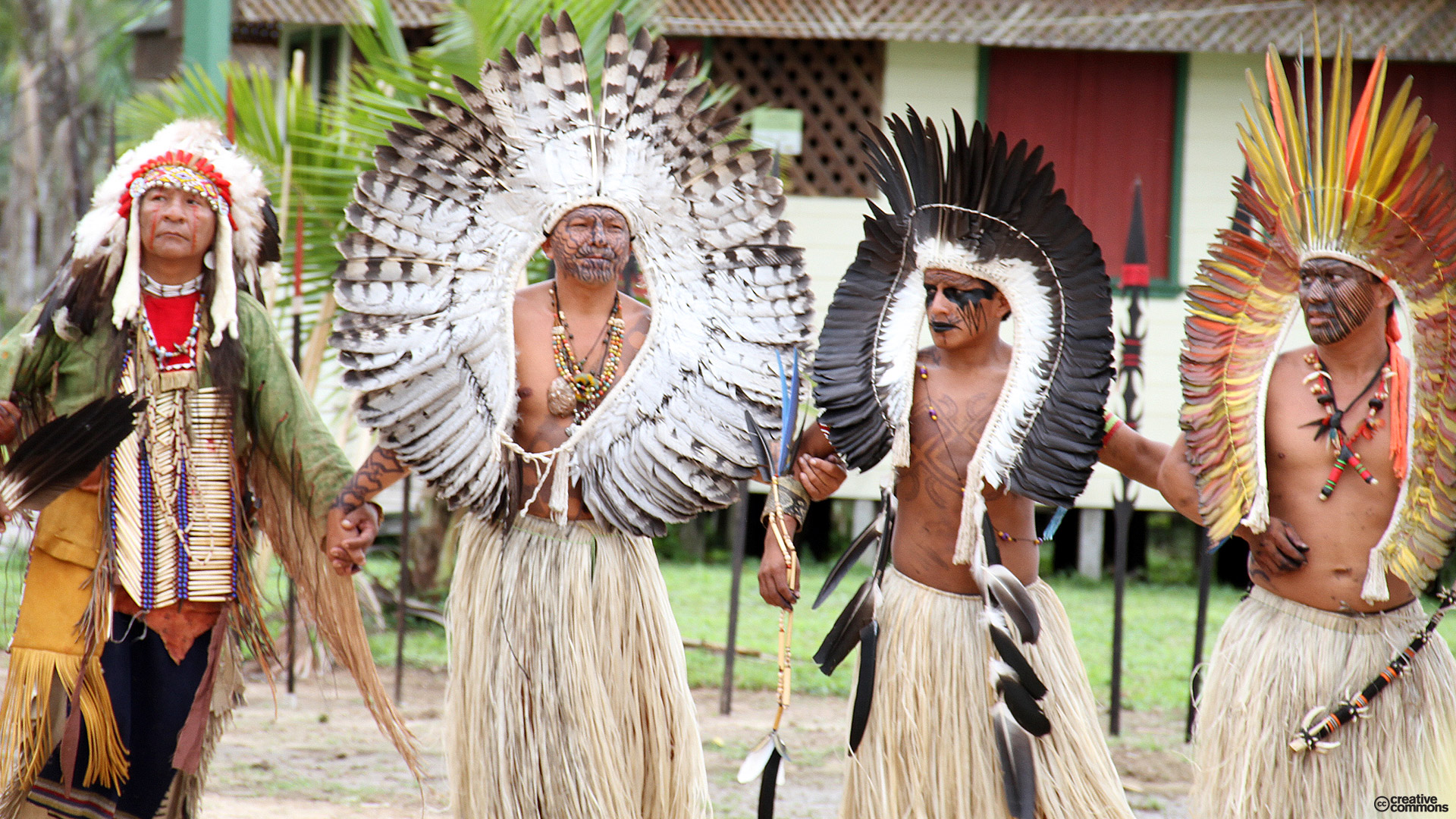
Patchwork from the 9th Festival of Yawanawa Culture. Brazil-Acre-Amazon-Rio Gregório

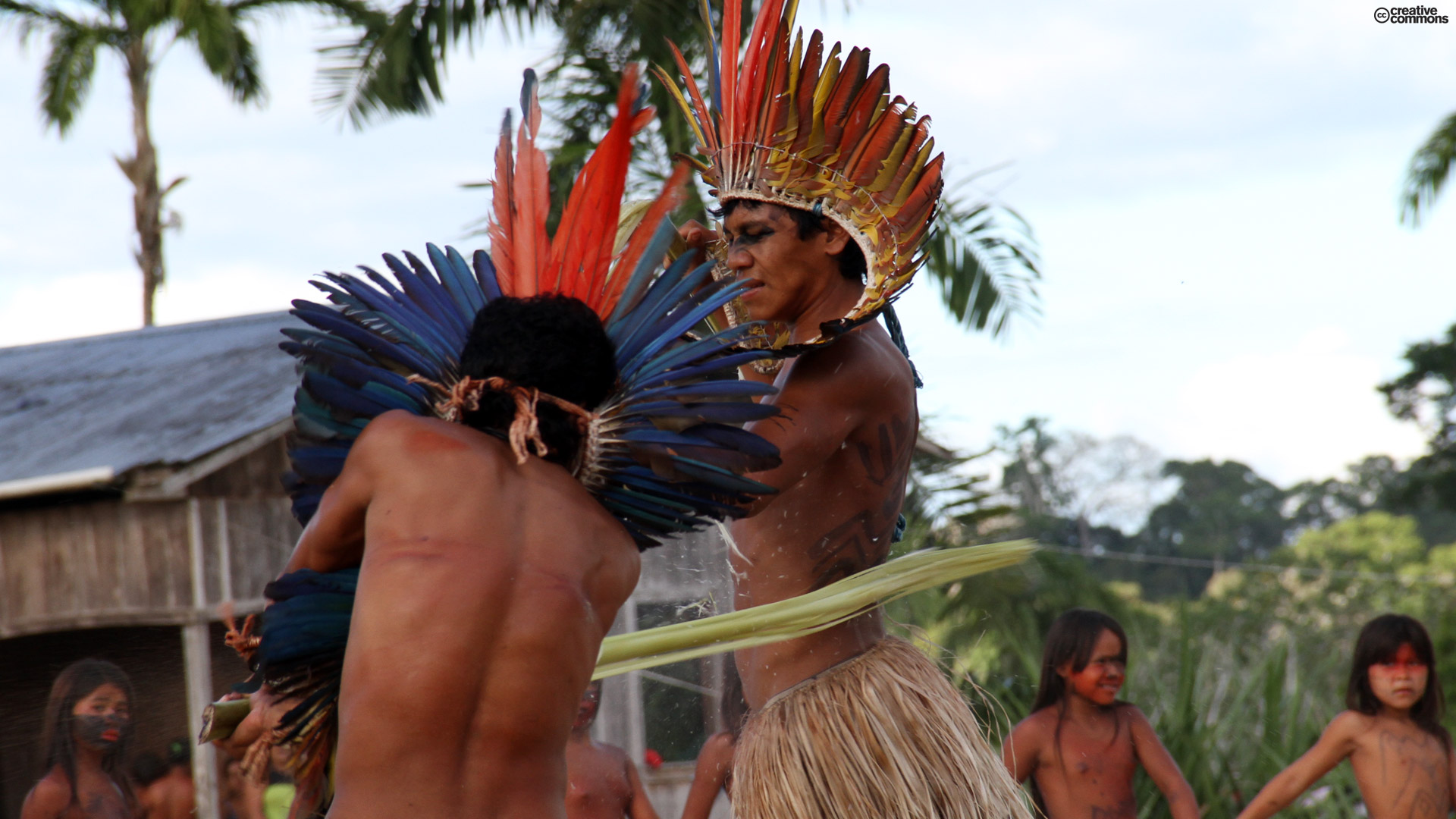

The Yaminawá (Iaminaua, Jaminawa, Yawanawa) are an Indigenous people who live in Acre (Brazil), Madre de Dios (Peru) and Pando (Bolivia). Their homeland is Acre, Brazil.

== Name ==
The Yaminawá translated to "people of the axe." They are also called the Iaminaua, Jaminawa, Yaminawá (in Brazil), and Yaminahua (in Peru and Bolívia), as well as Yuminahua, Yabinahua, Yambinahua, Yamanawa, and other variants. The Yaminawá name was given to them by outsiders. They have several autonyms including Bashonawá (basho = "opossum"), Marinawá (mari = "cutia", an agouti), Xixinawá (xixi = "white coati"), or Yawanawá (yawa = "wild boar").

== Language ==
The Yaminawá language belongs to the Panoan language family. Linguists estimate that less than 1,600 people speak the language. Its ISO 639-3 code is YAA. Very few Yaminawá people speak Spanish or Portuguese, and their literacy rate is extremely low.

== Current affairs ==
The Yawanawa community is currently led by Tashka and Laura Yawanawa. Tashka Yawanawa had served as Chief of the Yananawa since 2001. In just a few years, Tashka and his wife Laura (Mixteca-Zapoteca) have worked to increase Yawanawa territory, reinvigorate Yawanawa culture, and establish economically and socially empowering relationships with the outside world.

The Yawanawa community and their allies are developing a new model of sustainability that allows the Yawanawa to protect the rainforest and engage with the outside world on their own terms, without losing their cultural and spiritual identity.
