= Canelos-Quichua =

Indigenous group of Ecuador

The Canelos-Quichua, also known as the Quichua of Pastaza, is an Indigenous people of Ecuador. They are a Lowland Quichua (Runa Shimi) people, inhabiting the province of Pastaza on the banks of the Curaray, Bonbonaza, and Pastaza rivers, in Peru and eastern Ecuador.

The Canelos-Quicha take up to three years for courtship, kinship creation, and marriage under the guide of a shaman.

Their physical cultural heritage includes pottery.

They speak a dialect of the Kichwa language, and are one of the Amazonian Kichwas.
