= Tinigua =

Tinigua are the indigenous people who inhabited the river basin Yari, Caguan and today Caquetá Department of Colombia. In their language, Tinigua refers to the ancestors: tini probably meant “word of the ancients.”

== History ==
The Tinigua population drastically declined in the 19th century. First, the exploitation of the rubber, then as allies of the Witotos they faced the Muinane and Carijona, and had to abandon much of their territory and settle to the north. Finally they were attacked by settlers after 1949, which caused their extinction, so that in 1994 only survived two elderly brothers, in the Sierra de la Macarena, Meta.

The first references to this group were provided by the priest Martivell Fair (1925) and Capuchins missionary Gaspar de Pinell (1929). Language samples were collected by the Capuchins Estanislao Les Corts (1931), Fructuoso Manresa and Igualada and Marcelino Francisco de Castellvi, and the latter published in 1940 the first study of the language Tinigua.

== Language ==
According to Nubia Tobar, who interviewed some of the last speakers of the language, there were six oral vowels organized into three basic levels of openness: high, medium and low, and three positions: anterior, central and posterior, each of which with its corresponding glottalized and elongated. The 22 consonants were p, ph (aspirated), t, th (aspirated), t (palatal), ts (Africa), k, kh (aspirated), kw (velar) b, d, and (voiceless palatal sound), g, m, n, n, f, s, z (voiced alveolar fricative), h (voiceless glottal fricative), che (palatal affricate), and the glide w. The language was thought lost until two elderly speakers were located in the 1990s. Presumably the language is now extinct.

The Tinigua languages have been grouped in a family-Pamigua Tinigua since Castellvi (1940) demonstrated the affinity of the two languages, using the vocabularies collected by F. Pamigua Published by Ernst and Toro (1895). Of the Pamigua we know from Rivero (1763), who lived between Concepcion de Arama (Meta) and Guaviare, but we ignore the reason of their disappearance.
