= Coito =

- Village
- Location of Frei Paulo in Sergipe

- Location within Brazil
- Coordinates: 10°28′55″S 37°34′28″W
- Country: Brazil
- State: Sergipe
- Municipality: Frei Paulo
- Elevation: 319 m (1,047 ft)

Coito (Brazilian Portuguese pronunciation: [ˈkotʃu]) is a village in the municipality of Frei Paulo, state of Sergipe, in northeastern Brazil. In Portuguese "coito" means "hideout".

== See also ==
- List of villages in Sergipe
