= Capinan =

Historical Indigenous tribe from Alabama and Mississippi, U.S.

Total population
- extinct as a tribe

Regions with significant populations
- United States (Alabama, Mississippi)

Languages
- unattested, possibly a Siouan language

Religion
- Indigenous religion

Related ethnic groups
- possibly Pascagoula and Biloxi

The Capinan (also called Capina) were a small tribe of Native American people from Alabama and Mississippi.

The Capinan lived along the Gulf Coast region along the Pascagoula River almost north to its headwaters. They appear along the Pascagoula River, directly south of the Chickasaws in maps drawn by French cartographer Guillaume Delisle in 1703 and 1707.

The Capinan may have been the same tribe as the Moctobi and may have been a sub-tribe of the Pascagoula and Biloxi, both historically from Mississippi. The Capinan's language is unattested, but they might have spoken a Siouan language like the Biloxi language.

French explorer Pierre Le Moyne d'Iberville visited the tribe in 1699, and Jean-Baptiste Le Moyne, Sieur de Bienville in 1725.
