= Okchai =

Muskogee tribe

The Okchai (Creek: Okcaye) are a Muscogee tribe. They formed part of the former Creek (Muscogee) Confederacy in Alabama, prior to their removal during the 1830s to the Indian Territory.
