= Mobila =

The Mobila were a tribe of Native Americans that inhabited Mobile Bay and the Mobile-Tensaw River Delta. It is believed they are descended from the inhabitants of the village of Mabila destroyed by Hernando De Soto in 1540.
