= Guató people =

Indigenous people in Brazil and Bolivia

The Guató are an indigenous people living on the upper Paraguay River, along the border of modern-day Brazil and Bolivia. They aided the Brazilians in the war with Paraguay 1865–70.

A movie about the Guatós was released in 2004: "500 Almas" ("500 Souls") - which is named after the approximate number of Guatós left.
