= Qahatika =

Native American tribe

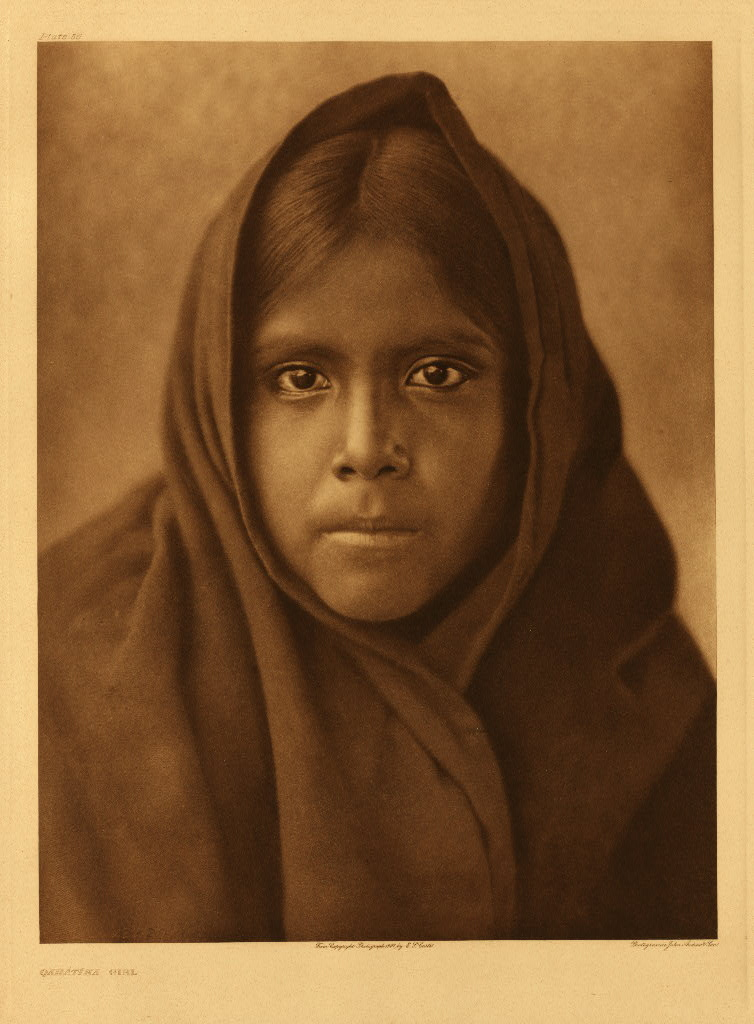
Qahatika girl. Photograph by E. S. Curtis.

The Qahatika (or Kohatk) were a Native American tribe of the Southwestern United States and lived in the vicinity of present-day Quijotoa, Arizona.

According to Edward Sheriff Curtis, the Qahatika belonged to the Pima group of tribes and lived in five villages "in the heart of the desert south of the Gila River", about forty miles from the Pima reservation. A legend said that after the Pima suffered defeat in a war with Apache, the tribe fled and split. One splinter of the tribe, the ancestors of Qahatika, went into the barren desert and settled there in separation from other Pimas. The Qahatika, according to Curtis, managed to find land suitable for growing wheat. Their method of "dry farming" relied exclusively on winter rainfall: the soil near their villages was capable of retaining winter moisture for a whole season, and a few winter rains guaranteed a fair crop in summer.

The Qahatika seen by Curtis were "almost identical in appearance" to Pima and Papago. They retained the Pima art of basket weaving and developed their own tradition of pottery. Their houses were built almost exclusively of dried giant cactus carcasses.
