= Chakchiuma =

Extinct Indigenous tribe from Mississippi

- Chacumas on Yazoo River (1785)

Total population
- extinct as a tribe merged into the Chickasaw and Choctaw.

Regions with significant populations
- formerly United States (Mississippi, Alabama, and Tennessee)

Languages
- Chakchiuma, and later Choctaw

Religion
- Indigenous religion

Related ethnic groups
- Chickasaw, Choctaw

The Chakchiuma were a Native American tribe of the upper Yazoo River region of what is today the state of Mississippi.

In the late 17th century, French explorers identified the Chakchiuma as "a Chicacha nation," indicating that they were related to the Chickasaw and similar Western Muskogean speaking–tribes. They likely shared a common origin as the Chickasaw and Choctaw people and merged into the Chickasaw and Choctaw Nations in the mid-18th century.

== Name ==
According to Swanton, the name was originally Sa'ktcihuma "red crawfish," referring to the tribal totem. This name is cognate with the Choctaw shakchi humma "red crawfish". It has appeared in European language sources in a variety of ways, including as Sacchuma and Saquechuma in records of de Soto's travels, and as Choquichoumans by d'Iberville. Swanton argued that the name Houma derives from Chakchiuma.

== History ==
The first historical reference to the Chakchiuma is found when Hernando de Soto sent a contingent of troops against them while he was staying with the Chickasaw. In 1700, English colonists from the Province of Carolina convinced Quapaw warriors to attack the Chakchiuma to capture members of their tribe to sell into slavery in the Carolinas. The ensuing attack was unsuccessful. Historian Alan Gallay suggests the colonists turned to the Quapaw because their usual partners in the Indian slave trade, the Chickasaw, may have resisted attacking their own people.

The Chakchiuma participated on the French side in the Yazoo War. In about 1739 the Chakchiuma were involved in hostilities, primarily with the Chickasaw, that led to their destruction as an independent tribe and their being incorporated into the Chickasaw and Choctaw tribes. The Chickasaw and Choctaw had become so incensed that they not only killed all the Chakchiuma warriors but also every animal found in their villages. But the Chakchiuma were numerous enough to form their own clan (the Crawfish) within the Choctaw when they were incorporated into the latter group in the 1730s.

=== Historical populations ===
Based on Bienville's claim that there were 400 families of the Chakchiuma in 1702, historians estimate they numbered around or above 2000 persons in total, given what is known of the size of their families. By 1704 their numbers had fallen to 80 families due to war. They likely had fewer than 500 people. Bienville recorded there were only 60 families by 1735. Phillippe de Rigaud de Vaudreuil, governor-general of New France wrote that they had been wiped out in warfare; however, Jerome Courtance, a white trader, wrote in 1757 survivors had settled in Chickasaw villages.
