= Changuena language =

Extinct Chibchan language

Chánguena
- Chánguina
- Native to: Costa Rica
- Extinct: (date missing)
- Language family: Chibchan: Isthmic; Doracic; Chánguena

Language codes
- ISO 639-3: None (mis)
- Glottolog: chan1324

Chánguena (Chánguina) is an extinct Chibchan language of Costa Rica.
