= Dorasque people =

Indigenous people of Costa Rica

The Dorasque were an Indigenous people of Costa Rica who were reportedly warlike and lived in the valleys of the Chiriquí Viejo, Changuena and Diquis rivers, and possibly a little further east along the Pacific Ocean. They are seen as more "civilized" than neighboring groups. They are often credited as having made the pottery and gold ornaments found in the ancient graves of Chiriquí. They had trade relations with Niquirans and Chorotegans of Costa Rica.

They spoke the Dorasque language.

== History ==
Before the arrival of the Spanish, the Isthmus of Panama was inhabited by various indigenous peoples, including the Cuevas and the Dorasques. The Dorasques, also known as Dorados, Dorás, Doraces, or Dorces, lived in the regions that today comprise the provinces of Bocas del Toro, Chiriquí, and Veraguas, as well as the Ngäbe-Buglé Comarca and Punta Burica.

== Religion ==
The Dorasques practiced a religion centered on the veneration of the sun (father), the moon (mother), and the stars (children), as well as other minor deities responsible for various functions, such as Mother Earth, the protector of crop fertility. They did not build temples but conducted ceremonies in specific locations where they performed sacrifices and religious practices. They gathered at sites with petroglyphs, where they left offerings. A distinctive feature of these representations is the presence of figures with a single central eye.

The religious beliefs of the Dorasques have provided concrete elements for researchers to analyze their cosmovision, language, traditions, and ancestral tales and legends. These studies have led to the conclusion that the indigenous "Bokotas," also known as "Buglés," are the present-day and sole direct descendants of the Dorasque culture.

== Study ==
The French ethnographer Alphonse Louis Pinart stated that in 1882, the last indigenous member of the Dorasque nation died in Gualaca. He also mentioned that in the 19th century, there was a small community of Chalivas belonging to the Dorasque-Changuina nation. These were the indigenous people who, at the time of the conquest, had their main settlements behind the Chiriquí Volcano, in the Chiriquí and Talamanca mountain ranges, where they bordered nations such as the Teribis, Terrabas, and Cabécares, reaching as far as the northern coast and the Chiriquí Lagoon.

Eusebio A. Morales stated that the Doraces never submitted to Spanish authorities and continuously rebelled against foreign domination, often completely destroying colonial settlements. However, due to attacks by the Miskito indigenous people from Nicaragua, the Doraces were forced to seek Spanish protection to avoid total annihilation. This marked the beginning of a long process of acculturation between these two distinct human groups—the indigenous and the European.
