= Arawá language =

Extinct Arawan language of Brazil

Aruá
- Native to: Brazil
- Region: Amazonas State
- Ethnicity: Arawá
- Extinct: 1877
- Language family: Arawan: Aruá

Language codes
- ISO 639-3: aru
- Glottolog: arua1263

Arawá or Aruá is an extinct language of Brazil. Its last speaker died in 1877, before any significant documentation of the language could be completed. The only surviving documentation of the language is an 1869 word list.

The language did, however, give its name to the language family that it was a part of, which is now called the Arawan languages. This family covers the extant languages Kulina, Deni, Jamamadi, Paumari, and Suruwahá, all found in Western Brazil and Peru.
