= Himarimã language =

Arawan language of Brazil

Himarimã
- Hi-Merima
- Native to: Brazil
- Region: Tapauá River valley
- Ethnicity: Hi-Merimã people
- Native speakers: (undated figure of 40)
- Language family: Arawan: Himarimã

Language codes
- ISO 639-3: hir
- Glottolog: hima1247
- ELP: Himarimã

Himarimã is the language of the uncontacted Hi-Merimã people in Amazonas, Brazil. A contact may have happened in 2007. A wordlist was recorded, but was later lost. The language is believed to be Arawán per testimonies from the Suruwahá and Banawá.

== History ==
A group of ten Marimã were illegally contacted in 1986 by missionaries; all the adults died and five of the children were adopted by non-Indigenous families. The only child alive as of 2024, named Atxu Marimã, had provided a list of 105 words to Adolpho Killian, an employee of the Fundação Nacional dos Povos Indígenas (FUNAI) when he was around eight years old and could still speak the language.
