= Arawan languages =

Language family of South America

Arawán
- Arauán
- Geographic distribution: Brazil and Peru
- Linguistic classification: Harákmbut–Katukinan ? Macro-Arawakan ?: Arawán
- Subdivisions: Arawá †; Kulina; Deni; Jamamadi; Paumari; Zuruahá

Language codes
- ISO 639-5: auf
- Glottolog: araw1282
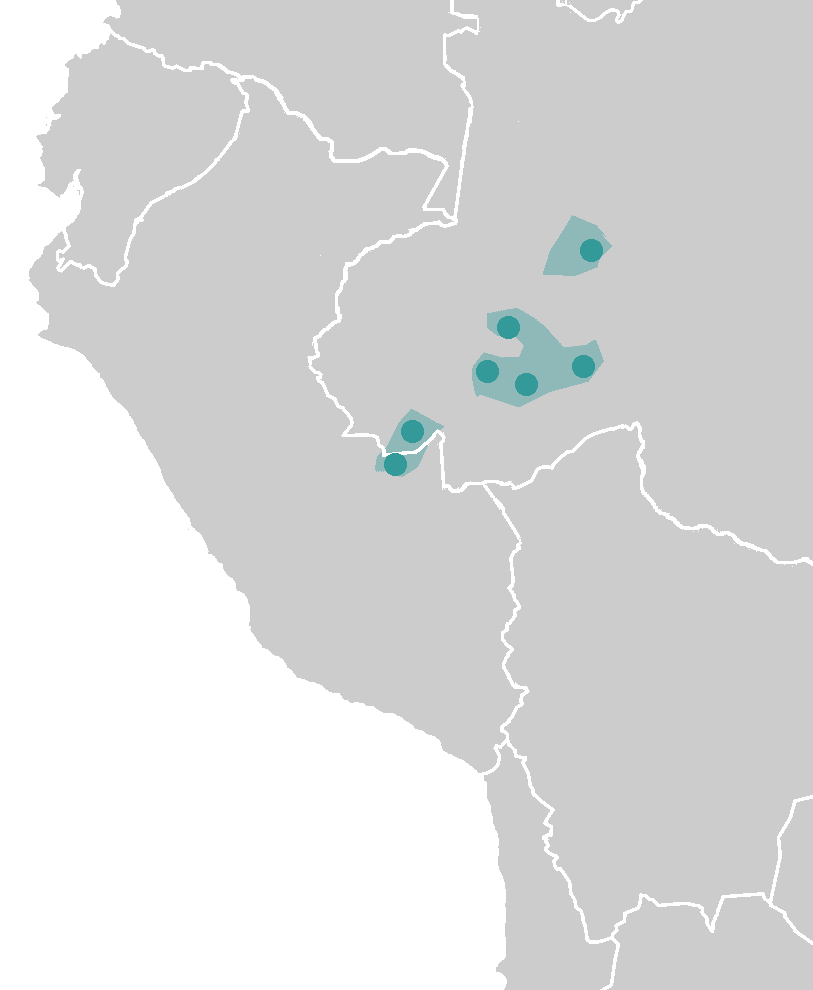

Arawan (also Arahuan, Arauan, Arawán, Arawa, Arauán) is a family of languages spoken in western Brazil (Amazonas, Acre) and Peru (Ucayali).

== Language contact ==
Jolkesky (2016) notes that there are lexical similarities with the Chapakura-Wañam, Jivaro, Kwaza, Maku, Mura-Matanawi, Taruma, Yanomami, Arawak, Nadahup, Puinave-Kak, and Tupi language families due to contact.

== Family division ==
Arauan consists of half a dozen languages:

- Arawá †
- Kulina
- Deni
- Jamamadi
- Paumari
- Suruwahá

=== Jolkesky (2016) ===
Internal classification by Jolkesky (2016):

(† = extinct)

- Arawa
  - Suruwaha
  - Madi-Deni-Paumari
    - Paumari
    - Deni, Kulina
    - Madi-Arawa
      - Arawa †
      - Madi
        - Banawa
        - Jamamadi
        - Jarawara

=== Dienst (2010) ===
Internal classification by Dienst (2010):

- Arawan
  - Arawa †
  - Paumari
  - Suruwahá
  - Madi-Madihá
    - Madi
      - Eastern Jamamadi
      - Banawá
      - Jarawara
    - Madihá
      - Kulina
      - Western Jamamadi
      - Deni

=== Mason (1950) ===
Arauá internal classification by Mason (1950):

- Arauá
  - Arauá
  - Culino
    - Culina
    - Curia
    - Curiana
    - Culiña
  - Pama
    - Pama
    - Pamana
  - Yamamadí
    - Yamamadí: Capaná, Capinamari, Colo
    - Purupurú: Paumarí (Pammarí)
    - Yuberi
  - Madihá
  - Sewacu
  - Sipó

=== Other varieties ===
- Himarimã - presumed language spoken by the Himarimã people along the Piranha River between the Juruá River and Purus River. Per Suruwahá and Banawá testimonies, as well as a lost wordlist, it is believed to be Arawan.

=== Loukotka (1968) ===
Varieties listed by Loukotka (1968):

- Purupurú - extinct language spoken in the same region on the lower course of the Purus River. (Unattested)
- Uainamari / Wainamarí - extinct language spoken on the Inauini River, a tributary of the upper Purus River. (Unattested)
- Uatanari / Watanarí - once spoken on the Ituxi River and Sepatini River in the same region; now perhaps extinct. (Unattested)
- Sewacu - once spoken on the Pauini River, now on the left bank of the Purus River on the opposite side of the mouth of the Sepatini River. (Unattested)
- Pamana - once spoken on the Ituxi River and Mucuim River near Lake Agaam, the same region; now probably extinct. (Unattested)
- Amamati - extinct language once spoken on the Mucuim River north of the Pamana tribe. (Unattested)
- Yuberí / Xubiri - once spoken on the middle course of the Purus River on the opposite side of the mouth of the Mamoriá River and around Lake Abunini, now on the lower course of the Tapauá River, the same region. (Unattested) A wordlist labeled with this language's name, "recorded" by Johann Natterer, is blank.
- Sipó / Cipo - extinct language once spoken north of the Yuberi tribe on the Tapaua River. (Unattested)
- Curina / Kurina / Kólö - language spoken in two regions; first, on the right bank of the Juruá River, along the Marari River and on the upper course of the Tapauá River; second, on the Eiru River and Gregório River and on the left bank of the Muru River, territory of Acre, Brazil.
- Madiha - spoken on the Eiru River near Bom Jardim, Amazonas.
- Catiana - extinct language once spoken on the Iaco River, Acre. (Unattested)

== Proto-language ==
Below are selected Proto-Arawá (Proto-Arawan) reconstructions of flora and fauna names by Dixon (2004):

=== Flora ===
Proto-Arawá	English gloss	Portuguese gloss
*biha	yam sp.	carai
*boba	palm sp.	paxiúba
*bodi	fruit sp.	bacuri
*'boko	tree sp.	imbaúba
*doni	tonka bean	cumaru
*hawa	patauá palm	patauá
*imi	ingá (tree and edible fruit)	ingá
*jani	palm sp.	paxiubinha
*jawana	palm sp.	murumuru
*jawida	peach palm	
*kahami	palm sp.	urucuri
*majo	tree sp.	pajurá
*nabohi	palm sp.	paxiúba-barriguda
*ora	genipap	jenipapo
*para'i	assai palm	
*sanaro	passion fruit	maracujá
*tamajara	matamatá tree, envira tree	matamatá, envira
*tamino	jackfruit tree	
*waishowa	several trees of genus Lucuma	abiurana
*wasina, *wasini	kapok ceibe tree	samaúma, Ceiba pentandra
*wekhe'i	rubber tree	Hevea brasiliensis
*xidepe	tree sp.; red paint made from fruit	urucu, Bixa orellana

=== Fauna ===
==== Mammals ====
Proto-Arawá	English gloss	Portuguese gloss
*gapha	woolly monkey	
*hijama	white-lipped peccary	
*hojawa	giant anteater	
*ja'o	sloth sp.	
*jajiko	howler monkey	
*jotomi	coati	quati
*jowi(hi)	capuchin monkey	
*kawina	howler monkey	
*kiriwe	three-toed sloth	
*kishi-	armadillo	tatu
*kiso	capuchin monkey	
*kosikosi	kinkajou, night monkey	jupará
*mase	bat	
*modo	anteater	tamanduá
*mowi	night monkey	
*pishi	squirrel monkey; marmoset (small monkey)	macaco-de-cheiro, Saimiri sciureus
*shawa(ri)	weasel sp.	irara
*shinama	agouti	cutia
*tamakori	monkey sp.	macaco parauaçu, Pithecia monachus

==== Birds ====
Proto-Arawá	English gloss	Portuguese gloss
*ama'ahawa	socó heron	socó
*amasawari	socozinho heron	socozinho
*dapo	guan (bird sp.)	
*DiroDiro	kingfisher	
*hiriti	motmot bird	
*jakhi	toucan (Ramphastos)	
*kamowa	dove sp.	juriti, rolinha
*kawashiro	oriole	
*komi	trogon (bird sp.)	
*khere	kingfisher	ariramba
*okoko	pigeon, dove sp.	juriti
*shabiria	eagle-hawk	Harpia harpyja
*tano	pied-crested oropendola (type of oriole)	japu
*tawikhoro(ro)	black-fronted nunbird	bico-de-brasa
*tobejaro, *tobejero)	nighthawk	bacurau
*wara-	chachalaca (bird)	aracuã

==== Fish ====
Proto-Arawá	English gloss	Portuguese gloss
*aba majaro	arowana (fish sp.)	aruanã
*'awida	piau sp. (fish)	piau
*bahama	surubim (large fish)	surubim
*basani	pacu (fish sp.)	pacu
*bidama	catfish sp.	mandi
*dawi	big leaf calathea (fish sp.)	
*kosop(h)a	tucunaré (fish sp.)	tucunaré
*khorobo	fish sp.	jeju?
*moro	fish sp. (cangati sp.; large catfish)	cangati; jai preto, Paulicea luetkeni
*otawi	cará (fish sp.)	cará
*siraba	fish sp.	cangati, cará, acará
*shako	lungfish	traíra

==== Other animals ====
Proto-Arawá	English gloss	Portuguese gloss
*kowasa	tortoise	
*shire	turtle	tartaruga
*bitha	large mosquito	carapanã
*'Diriri	cicada	
*jimo, *jomo	ant sp.	tocandira
*karajati	biting fly	mutuca
*waharo	large mosquito	carapanã

== Bibliography ==
- Buller, Barbara; Buller, Ernest; & Everett, Daniel L. (1993). Stress placement, syllable structure, and minimality in Banawá. International Journal of American Linguistics, 59 (1), 280-293.
- Campbell, Lyle. (1997). American Indian languages: The historical linguistics of Native America. New York: Oxford University Press. ISBN 0-19-509427-1.
- Dixon, R. M. W. (2001). Internal reconstruction of tense-modal suffixes in Jarawara. Diachronica, 18, 3-30.
- Dixon, R. M. W. (2004a). The Jarawara language of southern Amazonia. Oxford: Oxford University Press. ISBN 0-19-927067-8.
- Dixon, R. M. W. (2004b). Proto-Arawá phonology. Anthropological Linguistics, 46, 1–83.
- Kaufman, Terrence. (1990). Language history in South America: What we know and how to know more. In D. L. Payne (Ed.), Amazonian linguistics: Studies in lowland South American languages (pp. 13–67). Austin: University of Texas Press. ISBN 0-292-70414-3.
- Kaufman, Terrence. (1994). The native languages of South America. In C. Mosley & R. E. Asher (Eds.), Atlas of the world's languages (pp. 46–76). London: Routledge.

Lexicons

- Chapman, Sh.; Salzer, M. (1998). Dicionário bilíngue nas línguas paumarí e portuguesa. Porto Velho: Sociedade Internacional de Lingüística.
- Koop, G.; Koop, L. (1985). Dicionário Dení Português (com introdução gramatical). Porto Velho: Summer Institute of Linguistics.
- Ssila, A. O.; Monserrat, R. M. F. (1984). Dicionário kulina-português e português-kulina (dialeto do Igarapé do Anjo). Acre: Conselho Indigenista Missionário.
- Suzuki, M. (2002). Dicionário suruwahá-português and vocabulário português- suruwahá. Hawaii: University of the Nations.
- Vogel, A. R. (2005). Dicionário Jarawara - Português. Cuiabá: SIL.
