= Jafi =

Jafi or JAFI may refer to:

- Jewish Agency for Israel
- Banawá or Jafí, an indigenous group in Brazil
- Jafi language, a language of Brazil
- Jafi dialect, a variety of the Sorani language of Iran
