= Deni =

Deni may refer to:

- Deni language
- Deni (дени), 1/100 of a Macedonian denar
- Department of Education (Northern Ireland)
- Deni (weightlifter), Indonesian weightlifter
- Said Deni, president of Puntland (since 2019)
- Viktor Deni (1893–1946), Russian satirist, cartoonist and poster artist
- Deni Avdija (born 2001), Israeli professional basketball player

== See also ==
- Denny (disambiguation)
