= Kulina people =

Indigenous people of Brazil and Peru

Kulina
Total population
- 5975 (2007–2010)

Regions with significant populations
- Brazil: 5,558 (2010)
- Peru: 417 (2007)

Languages
- Kulina

Religion
- Shamanism

The Kulina are an Indigenous people of Brazil and Peru. 2,540 Kulina live in Amazonas and Acre in Brazil; while 400 live in southeastern Peru, along the Purus and Santa Rosa Rivers.

== Name ==
Besides Kulina, they are also called Corina, Culina, Kulína, Kulyna, Madihá, and Madija.

== Language ==
Kulina people speak the Kulina language, which is an Arawan language. Parts of the Bible have been translated into Kulina.
