= Juruá–Purus moist forests =

Ecoregion in the Amazon biome

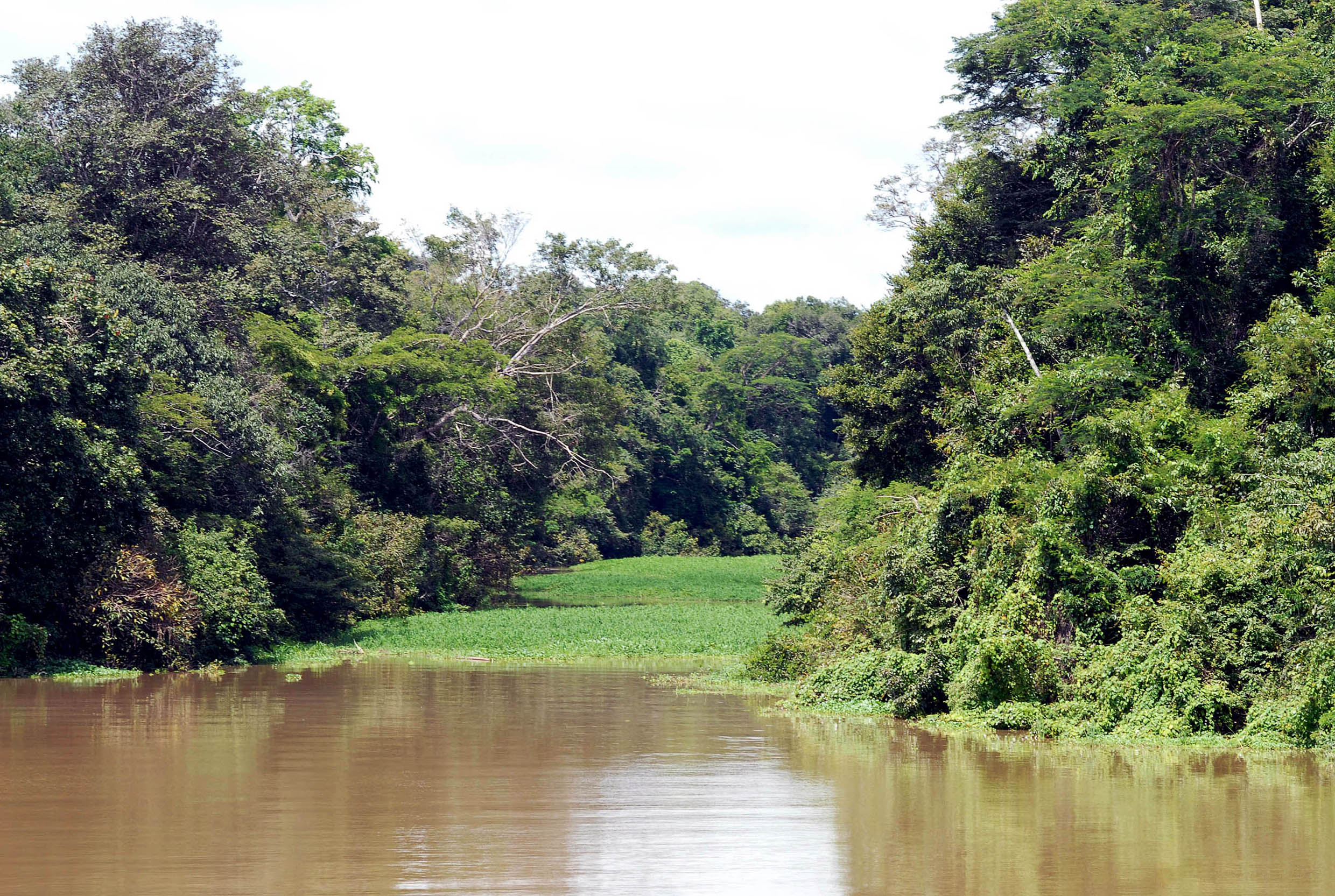
- Tefé National Forest

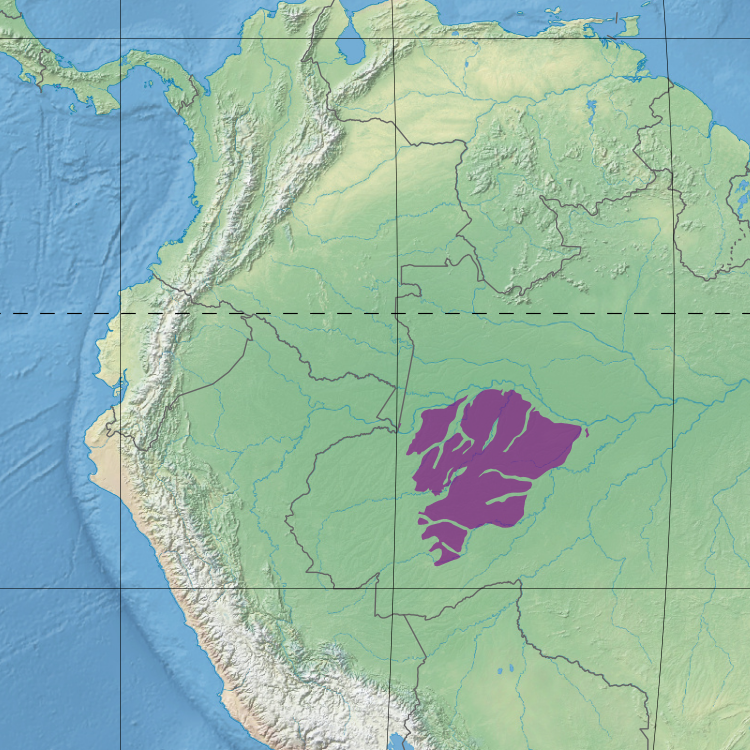
- Ecoregion territory (in purple)

Ecology
- Realm: Neotropical
- Biome: Tropical and subtropical moist broadleaf forests

Geography
- Area: 242,681.88 km^{2} (93,700.00 sq mi)
- Country: Brazil
- Coordinates: 4.878°S 66.363°W

The Juruá–Purus moist forests (NT0133) is an ecoregion in northwest Brazil in the Amazon biome. The terrain is very flat and soils are poor. The rivers flood annually. There are no roads in the region, and the dense rainforest is relatively intact, although plans to extend the Trans-Amazonian Highway through the region would presumably cause widespread damage to the habitat.

== Location ==
The Juruá–Purus moist forests ecoregion is in the state of Amazonas in northwest Brazil to the south of the Solimões, or upper Amazon River. It has an area of 24,268,188 hectares (59,968,000 acres). The ecoregion is bounded to the north, east and south by stretches of the Purus várzea ecoregion along the Solimões and Purus rivers. The ecoregion contains the Juruá River, which has typical flora and fauna. Urban centers include Carauari, Tefé, Coari and Jutaí.

The várzea, or flooded forest, extends along rivers within the ecoregion. To the west the Juruá–Purus moist forests adjoin the Southwest Amazon moist forests. The western boundary follows the boundary of "dense lowland ombrophilous Amazonian forest" defined by the Brazilian Institute of Geography and Statistics in 1993. The limit in the southwest is northeast of the Carauari Arch, an ancient uplift zone.

== Physical ==
The ecoregion is in the low Amazon basin, with elevations from 20 to 60 metres (66 to 197 ft) above sea level. The terrain consists of flat, forest-covered plains cut by large, meandering rivers with many oxbow lakes and thousands of smaller watercourses, all of which flood each year. Major rivers include the Jutaí, mid-lower Juruá, Tefé, Tapauá and mid-lower Purus rivers. The sediments of the low Amazon basin were formed during the late Tertiary period, and are relatively young and easily eroded. For this reason the rivers are whitewater rivers that hold suspended mineral and organic sediments. Soils include sandy podzols and hydromorphic clay, typically acidic and low in nutrients.

== Climate ==
The Köppen climate classification is "Af": equatorial, fully humid. Average temperatures are 26 to 27 °C (79 to 81 °F) throughout the year. Annual precipitation averages 2,500 millimetres (98 in), with as much as 3,500 millimetres (140 in) in some places. Monthly rainfall is typically 200 to 300 millimetres (7.9 to 11.8 in), with least rain falling in July.

== Ecology ==
The Juruá–Purus moist forests ecoregion is in the Neotropical realm and the tropical and subtropical moist broadleaf forests biome. It is part of the Southwestern Amazon Moist Forests global ecoregion, which also includes the Southwest Amazon moist forests, Purus–Madeira moist forests, and Madeira–Tapajós moist forests.

=== Flora ===
The ecoregion is almost completely covered in evergreen tropical rainforest. The forests have a high level of plant diversity. Thus there are over 60 species of trees in the family Sapotaceae. Near Carauari there are 250 tree species per hectare. There are many different timber species but no dense stands of timber.

The canopy is usually dense and about 30 metres (98 ft) high, with emergent trees up to 45 metres (148 ft) high. In small patches the canopy is more open and the understory less dense. Trees generally have small diameters of less than 30 centimetres (12 in), and rarely have trunks larger than 40 to 70 centimetres (16 to 28 in) wide. A few giant trees have trunks up to 240 centimetres (94 in) wide such as Cariniana decandra, Osteophloem platyspermum, Piptadenia suaveolens, genus Brosimum, Eschweilera blanchetiana and Sclerobium paraense.

As with other parts of the Amazon rainforest the most important families of trees are Fabaceae, Sapotaceae, Lecythidaceae, Moraceae, Chrysobalanaceae, Lauraceae and Myristicaceae. Four common palms are Astrocaryum vulgare, Oenocarpus bataua, Attalea maripa and Socratea exorrhiza. Other common species are Eschweilera alba, Eschweilera odora, Pouteria guianensis, Vantanea guianensis, Ragala sanguinolenta, Licania apetala and Iryanthera ulei.

=== Fauna ===
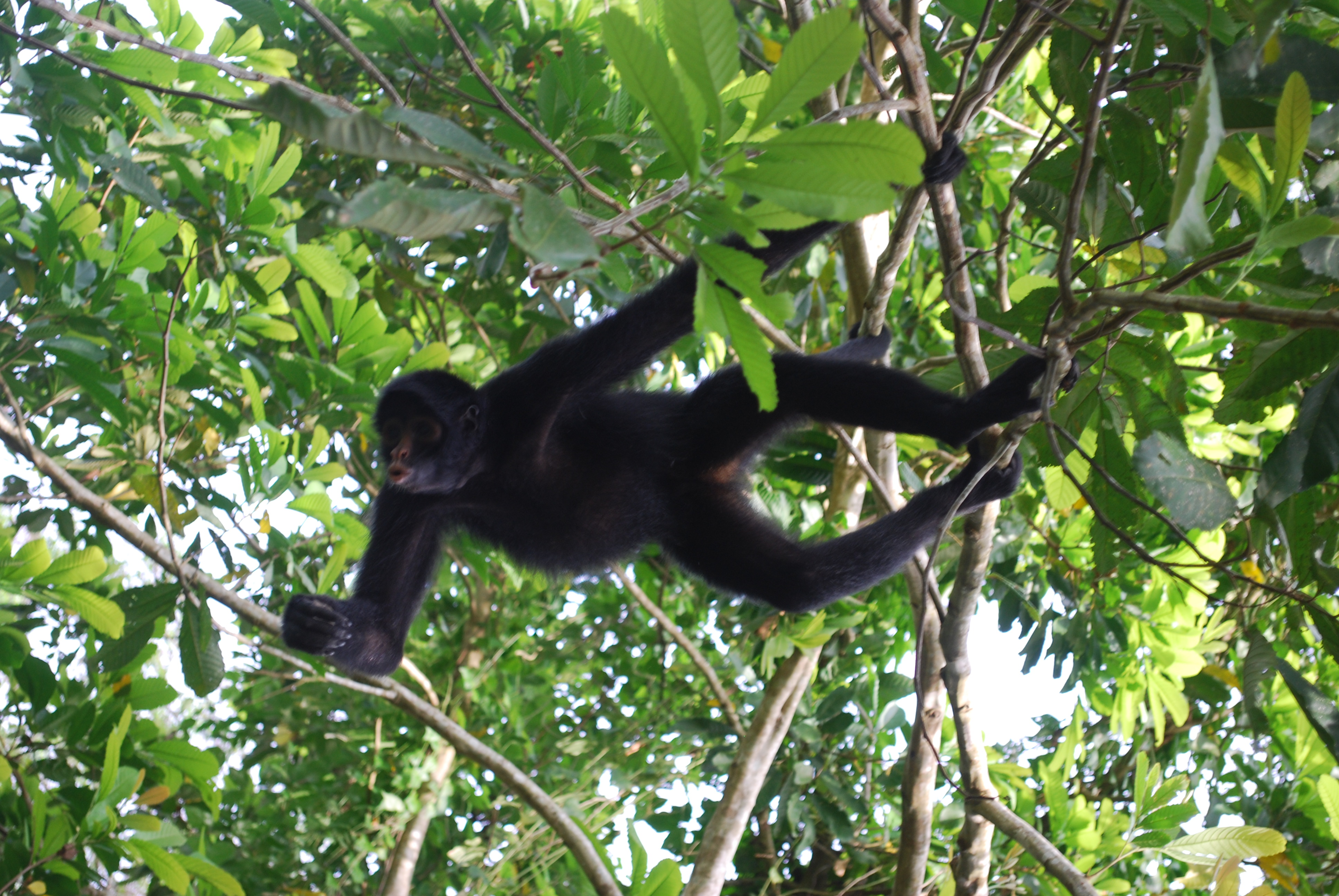
Peruvian spider monkey (Ateles chamek)

Rivers such as the Purus and Tapauá form barriers to movement of some species of primates and insects, with distinct subspecies on either side of the river. Many species are endemic to the eocregion. There are more than 170 species of mammals. Almost 120 species of mammals have been recorded at one location on the upper Urucu River. Mammals that move between flooded and terra firme forests include common squirrel monkey (Saimiri sciureus), white-fronted capuchin (Cebus albifrons), brown woolly monkey (Lagothrix lagotricha) and collared peccary (Pecari tajacu).

Large mammals include silky anteater (Cyclopes didactylus), southern tamandua (Tamandua tetradactyla), giant anteater (Myrmecophaga tridactyla), brown-throated sloth (Bradypus variegatus), jaguar (Panthera onca), cougar (Puma concolor), red brocket (Mazama americana), gray brocket (Mazama gouazoubira) and South American tapir (Tapirus terrestris). Species local to the Southwestern Amazon Moist Forests include the short-eared dog (Atelocynus microtis), Linnaeus's two-toed sloth (Choloepus didactylus), pygmy marmoset (Cebuella pygmaea), brown-mantled tamarin (Saguinus fuscicollis) and Goeldi's marmoset (Callimico goeldii). Endangered mammals include Peruvian spider monkey (Ateles chamek) and giant otter (Pteronura brasiliensis).

There are over 550 species of birds, including many endemic species. Seasonal migrant birds include the white-throated toucan (Ramphastos tucanus), parrots (genus Amazona) and macaws (genus Ara). Non-migratory birds include tanagers (genera Tangara and Tachyphonus), woodcreepers (genus Xiphorhynchus), pavonine quetzal (Pharomachrus pavoninus), wattled curassow (Crax globulosa), nocturnal curassow (Nothocrax urumutum), razor-billed curassow (Mitu tuberosum) and tinamous (genera Crypturellus and Tinamus). Endangered birds include wattled curassow (Crax globulosa).

== Status ==
The World Wildlife Fund classes the ecoregion as "Relatively Stable/Intact". No roads cross the ecoregion, which is relatively inaccessible, although both flora and fauna are affected by hunting and extractive logging. Petrobras has undertaken oil and natural gas exploration in the region for many years, creating deforested patches. A large area of forest near Tefé was cleared for an experimental agricultural project, but this was abandoned and the area is now covered in secondary forest. Urban centers and small farming settlements along the rivers are surrounded by land cleared for houses, agriculture and livestock pasturage. The expansion of small-scale livestock production poses a threat. A planned extension of the Trans-Amazonian Highway from Lábrea on the Purus River to Tabatinga on border between Peru, Brazil and Colombia would cause widespread habitat destruction.

== Sources ==
- "Juruá-Purus moist forests", Global Species, Myers Enterprises II
- Ruiz, Eduardo, Southwestern Amazon Moist Forests, WWF: World Wildlife Fund
- Sears, Robin, South America: Amazon Basin, northwestern Brazil (NT0133), WWF: World Wildlife Fund
- WildFinder, WWF: World Wildlife Fund
