= Zuruahã =

Total population
- 142 (2010)

Regions with significant populations
- Brazil (Amazonas)

Languages
- Zuruahã

Religion
- traditional tribal religion

Related ethnic groups
- Jokihidawa, Nakydanidawa, Sarakoadawa, Korobidawa, Masanidawa, Ydahidawa, and Zamadawa

The Zuruahã (also Suruahá, Indios do Coxodoá, and Suruwahá) are an Indigenous people of Brazil, living along the Purus River in the state of Amazonas.

== History ==
The Zuruahã are an amalgamation of other tribes fleeing disease and violence, especially from the rubber boom. Some of the original Zuruahã traded with the rubber tappers but the tribe contracted influenza, resulting in a high death rate, from 1922 to 1924. The survivors withdrew away from non-Native settlements.

They enjoyed relative isolation from non-Natives until the 1970s when missionaries and latex extractors entered their traditional territory. Daniel Everett reports that after first contact with the outside world, some Zuruahá, including eight in a day, have begun to commit suicide by drinking curare. Pressures on their territories results in increased suicide by the Zuruahã. Sustained contact began in 1980. They are hunter-gatherers.

In 1984, the Zuruahã Project was created to mitigate the adverse effects of outside contact on the Zuruahã people.

In 2018 they were contacted to receive dental prostheses, a key element for their survival.

== Language ==
Zuruahã people speak the Zuruahã language, an Arawá language.
