= Jamamadi =

Jamamadí
Total population
- 882 (in 2010)

Regions with significant populations
- Brazil (Amazonas State)

Languages
- Jamamadi, Portuguese

Related ethnic groups
- Banawá people

The Jamamadí (Jamamadí: wahati), also called the Yamamadi, Kanamanti, Kapaná, and Kapinamari, are an Indigenous people who live in Acre and Amazonas, Brazil.

They speak the Jamamadi language, part of the Arawá language family. Their territory is between the Juruá and Purus Rivers. The rubber booms of the 19th century brought non-Natives into their territory.

They are a sedentary people, who hunt, gather, farm, fish, and sell handicrafts for subsistence.
