= Banawá =

Total population
- 207 (2014)

Regions with significant populations
- Brazil (Amazonas)

Languages
- Banawá, a dialect of Jamamadí

Religion
- Traditional tribal religion, Protestantism

Related ethnic groups
- Jamamadi

The Banawá (also Banawa, Banavá, Jafí, Kitiya, Banauá) are an Indigenous group living along the Banawá River in the Amazonas State, Brazil. Their territory is between the Juruá and Purus Rivers. Approximately 158 Banawá people live in one major village and two smaller settlements containing a single extended family each. The Banawá, who call themselves Kitiya, speak Banawá, a dialect of the Madi language.

== History ==
Their territory was invaded at the end of the 19th century, during the rubber boom. In the 1990s, Brazil formally recognized their land rights.
