= Himarimã =

Indigenous people of Brazil

Total population
- 1,000 (1943)

Regions with significant populations
- Brazil (Amazonas)

Languages
- Hi-Merimã

Religion
- traditional tribal religion

The Himarimã or Hi-Merimã are an Indigenous people of Brazil. They are largely uncontacted by outside society, and live along the Pinhuã River, between the Juruá and Purus Rivers, in the state of Amazonas.

Their numbers are uncertain, but in 1943 it was estimated that the Hi-Merimã consisted of more than 1,000 individuals. They were known primarily through their conflicts with neighboring tribes. They are considered isolated and mostly uncontacted. They have avoided prolonged contact with outward societies, as well as with neighboring native tribes, with whom they are antagonistic; however, they had some, intermittent contact with non-natives for the last 60 years.

== Language ==
Nothing is known about the Himarimã language.
