= Kulina language =

Arawan language of Brazil and Peru

Culina
- Native to: Peru, Brazil
- Ethnicity: Kulina people
- Native speakers: 3,900 (2002–2006)
- Language family: Arauan: Madihá; Culina

Language codes
- ISO 639-3: cul
- Glottolog: culi1244
- ELP: Culina

Kulina (also Kulína, Kulyna, Culina, Curina, Corina, Korina, Culina-Madijá, Madijá, Madija, Madiha, Madihá) is an Arawan language of Brazil and Peru spoken by about 4,000 Kulina people. With so few speakers, Kulina is considered a threatened language.

== History and geography ==
The Kulina people traditionally live in the states of Acre and Amazonas in Brazil and the Ucayali region in Peru. In Acre and Ucayali, the villages are found along the Purus and Envira rivers. In Amazonas, the villages are around the Juruá, Tarauacá and Jutaí rivers.

== Classification ==
Kulina is a member of the Arawan language family. According to Dienst (2014), it forms a Madihá dialect continuum with Western Jamamadi and Deni. The term madihá means 'people' in all of these languages.

Kulina is similar to the Deni language, as they have even been considered different dialects of the same language. Both languages have SOV word order, as well as three sets of alveolar affricate consonants. It is believed the presence of the reconstructed phoneme *s in place of the fricative *s^{h} is indicative of the Kulina and Deni languages as opposed to other languages in the Arawan family.

== Phonology ==
=== Consonants ===
		Labial	Dental	Alveolar	Velar	Glottal
Plosive/ Affricate	voiced	b	d̪	d͡z		
Plosive/ Affricate	voiceless	p	t̪	t͡s	k	
Plosive/ Affricate	aspirated	pʰ	t̪ʰ	t͡sʰ	kʰ	
Fricative						h
Nasal		m		n		
Rhotic				ɾ		
Approximant		β̞~w				

Consonant phonemes /pʰ, t̪, d͡z, t͡s, t͡sʰ, ɾ, β~w/ may also be realized as [ɸ~f, t͡ʃ, z~ɟ, s, sʰ~ʃ, l, v].

=== Vowels ===
	Front	Back
Close	i	
Mid	ɛ	o
Open	a	

The phoneme /a/ can also range to [ɨ]. The vowel [u] only appears in diphthongs.

== Grammar ==
The basic constituent order is subject–object–verb. It is predominantly a head-marking language with agglutinative morphology and some fusion. Kulina is a head-final language and contains many more suffixes than prefixes. There are two noun classes and two genders and agreement on transitive verbs is determined by a number of complex factors, both syntactic and pragmatic. In transitive sentences, the verb agree with the object in gender and with the subject in person and number. In intransitive sentences, the verb agrees with its subject in person, number and gender.

== Bibliography ==
- Boyer, Cindy & Jim Boyer. 2000. Dictionario [sic]: Culina - Castellano. Unpublished Manuscript.
- Dienst, Stefan. 2014. A Grammar of Kulina. Berlin: Walter de Gruyter.
- Dienst, Stefan. 2009. "Stative Verbs in Kulina". ReVel Revista Virtual de Estudos de Lingaugem.
- Diesnt, Stefan. 2008a. "Portuguese Influence on Kulina". In Thomas Stolz, Dik Bakker & Rosa Salas Palomo (eds.) Aspects of language contact. New theoretical, methodological and empirical findings with special focus on Romancisation processes, 287-297. Berlin & New York: Mouton de Gruyter.
- Dienst, Stefan. 2008b. "Why Kulina doesn't have an antipassive". Amerindia 32: 27-36.
- Dienst, Stefan. 2005. "The innovation of s in Kulina and Deni". Anthropological Linguistics 52: 209-243.
- Monserrat, Ruth Maria Fonini & Abel O. Silva. 1986. Gramática da língua Kulina. Dialeto do Igarapé do Anjo. Acre: Conselho Indigenista Missionário.
- Silva, Abel O. & Ruth M. F. Monserrat.1984. Dicionário Kulina – Português e Português – Kulina. (Dialeto do Igarapé do Anjo). Acre: Conselho Indigenista Missionário.
- Tiss, Frank. 2004. Gramática da língua Madiha (Kulina). São Leopoldo: Oikos.
- Wright, Pamela Sue. 1991. La hipótesis del inacusativo y los verbos mádija (culina). Revista Latino-americana de Estudios Ethnolingüísticos 6: 49-62.
- Wright, Pamela Sue. Madija predicates. Working Papers of the Summer Institute of Linguistics, University of North Dakota 39: 93-140.
