= Ingá =

District of Niterói, Rio de Janeiro, Brazil

Coordinates: 7°16′04″S 35°36′46″W

Ingá is one of the 48 administrative districts into which the city of Niterói, Rio de Janeiro in Brazil, is divided. It lies in the southern zone of the city, on the coast of the Guanabara Bay. It is named after ingá, a Brazilian native tree whose name is of Tupi origin.

From Ingá it is possible to see some of the most famous views of the Rio de Janeiro skyline and landscape.
