= Zuruahá language =

Arawan language spoken in Peru and Brazil

Zuruahá
- Suruahá
- ari jati
- Native to: Peru, Brazil
- Ethnicity: 140 Zuruahã people (2006)
- Native speakers: 140 (2006) monolingual
- Language family: Arawan: Zuruahá

Language codes
- ISO 639-3: swx
- Glottolog: suru1263
- ELP: Zuruahã

Zuruahá (also called Suruaha, Suruwaha, Suruwahá, Zuruwahã, Zuruaha, Índios do Coxodoá) is an Arawan language spoken in Brazil by about 130 people.

Zuruahá is mentioned in Kaufman (1994) from personal communication from Dan Everett. He made first contact with the community (a 3-day hike from Dení territory in Amazonas state) in 1980. The language had not been studied as of 1994, but seems most similar to Deni.

== Phonology ==
=== Vowels ===
Vowel Inventory

	Front	Central	Back
Close	i	ɨ	u^{1}
Open	a		

1. The vowel /u/ is ambiguous regarding its classification in the system. As in Deni and other languages of the family, it works as if it had an intermediate height between /a/ and /e/. In other words, /u/ is not specified in the terms of the close feature. The asymmetry of the vowel system is also due to the insertion of /i/ in the system. This vowel appears to have been introduced into the system more recently. According to Dixon and Everett, the central vowel was not part of the Proto-Arawá vowel system. In Suruwahá, it has a different behaviour than the other vowels: it is rare in the language of old people; never appears in diphthongs and is the phonetic realization of the neutralisation of the contrast between the other vowels in certain positions.

=== Consonants ===
Consonant Inventory

	Labial	Alveolar	Velar	Glottal
Plosive	b	t d^{1}	k g	
Nasal	m	n		
Tap		ɾ^{2}		
Affricate				
Fricative		s z		h
Approximant				

1. Suruwahá's alveolar plosive consonants are slightly backed, resembling retroflex consonants.
2. The alveolar tap occurs in colloquial speech, but, in careful pronunciation, it is actually pronounced as an alveolar lateral flap.

The voiceless labial plosive [p] does occur in some personal names, such as [paˈpi], and in recent Portuguese loanwords, such as [panˌjara] “aluminum cauldron”, derived from panela). It is also present in the interjection [pʲɛ], meaning “I do not want to!”/ “Go away!”/ “Are you crazy to make this suggestion?”. Because it is completely absent from the rest of the language and does not contrast with any other consonantal phoneme, it is not considered a phoneme.
