= Paumarí language =

Arauan language spoken in Brazil

Paumarí
- Pamoari
- Native to: Peru, Brazil
- Ethnicity: 870 Paumarí (2000)
- Native speakers: 290 (2007)
- Language family: Arauan: Paumarí

Language codes
- ISO 639-3: pad
- Glottolog: paum1247
- ELP: Paumarí

Paumarí (also Paumari, Purupuru, Kurukuru, Pamari, Purupurú, Pammari, Curucuru, Palmari) is an Arauan language spoken in Brazil by about 300 older adults out of an ethnic population of 900. It is spoken by the Paumari Indians, who call their language "Pamoari".

== Etymology ==
The word Pamoari has several different meanings in the Paumarí language: 'man', 'people', 'human being', and 'client'. These multiple meanings stem from their different relationships with outsiders; presumably it means 'human being' when they refer to themselves to someone of ostensibly equal status, and 'client' when referring to their people among river traders and Portuguese speakers.

== Current status ==
Speakers of Arawan languages, particularly Paumarí (who have had the most contact with non-natives) are beginning to speak Portuguese. The result, for many of the speakers in Paumarí, is a hybrid of Portuguese and Paumarí, incorporating vocabulary from both languages while retaining the syntax of neither (Chapman, a researcher from the Summer Institute of Linguistics, claims that, at the time of her arrival in 1964, all Paumarí spoke a mixture of Paumarí and Portuguese). Out of the Paumarí group that inhabits the Tapauá River, the youth, which makes up nearly a majority of the population, spoke only Portuguese in 1964. This 'linguistic Creole' tendency in the Paumarí language highlights exactly why languages such as Paumarí are endangered.

== Phonology ==
Paumarí has a consonant inventory that is similar in size to most languages of the Amazon Basin, but is areally unusual for featuring bilabial and coronal implosives, which have been lost from other Arauan languages but are reconstructed clearly for the protolanguage of the family. It is one of very few languages in the New World to contrast implosives with other voiced stop consonants: similar contrasts are known only for a few other Amazonian languages. However, it has a very simple vowel system with only three contrastive vowels, the back one of which can range from [o] to [u].

Consonants
		Labial	Alveolar	Palatal	Velar	Glottal
Nasal		m	n			
Stop	implosive	ɓ	ɗ			
Stop	voiced	b	d	dʒ	ɡ	
Stop	tenuis	p	t	tʃ	k	ʔ
Stop	aspirated		tʰ		kʰ	
Fricative		f	s			h
Approximant		w		j		
Flap			ɾ			

Vowels
	Front	Back
High	i	o~u
Low	a	

Paumarí has a (C)V syllable structure: a syllable can only contain one vowel, which may or may not be preceded by a consonant. This is consistent among all Arawan languages (Dixon (1999), 295). Often two vowels will occur in a sequence, CVV, however, the length of the resulting syllable will often make a phonetic difference between the two vowels, and the syllable’s duration will correspond to the amount of vowels, reflecting a moraic structure also common in Japanese. Often in the Paumarí language, when an identical vowel occurs word-final and then word-initial in two sequential words, one of the two vowels will be dropped within the phrase.

=== Stress accent system ===
Dan Everett of the University of North Dakota has extensively studied the accent/stress system of the Paumarí and has claimed that the Paumarí’s accent system violates some of the most basic theories put forward by linguists with regards to stress systems. Paumarí has iambic feet, which means the accent tends towards the right, or latter, portion of the word or syllable set, and they are not weight-sensitive. Everett theorizes that stress placement and syllables in the Paumarí language are more exclusive from one another than many modern theories believe. Two types of accents are distinguished in Paumarí, primary stress and secondary stress. Primary stress is characterized by a sharp increase in intensity (volume) and by somewhat higher pitch, although the latter is difficult for non-speakers to distinguish and was found by digital analysis of sound wave of native speakers. Secondary stress in Paumarí is characterized by a slight increase in intensity and often an increase in syllable duration. The final syllable of a word always has one of the two of these and therefore is always somewhat stressed. The stress system starts at the final syllable and works its way to the left, or the beginning of the word, skipping every other syllable. In disyllabic words, the primary stress is placed on the final syllable. In polysyllabic words, the primary stress is assigned to the antepenult (third from last) syllable, and the last syllable is assigned secondary stress. If the polysyllabic word is five syllables or more, every odd syllable (leftward) from the antepenult syllable is also assigned secondary stress. Therefore, regardless of how many syllables a word has, the primary stress is always on the last or antepenult syllable. The beginning syllable for a word will only have primary stress if it is a three-syllable word, and will have secondary stress only if it contains an odd number (5, 7, 9, etc.) of syllables.

== Grammar ==
It is a largely head-marking language with unmarked SVO word order and an ergative alignment for marking of nouns combined with accusative marking of pronouns.

Paumarí has only two open word classes – nouns and verbs. However, it also has numerous closed classes including fourteen adjectives, adpositions, interjections, conjunctions and demonstratives. Paumarí nouns are elaborately divided into over one hundred possessed nouns and a larger number of free nouns. Furthermore, each free noun has grammatical gender - being either masculine or feminine, with feminine being the unmarked gender and indicated by the suffix -ni.

Verb roots have up to fifteen suffix positions, but all are only optionally filled. Most of these refer to location or aspect, plus a negative suffix -ra.

== Morphology ==
Paumarí is primarily an agglutinative language, and primarily suffixing, although many prefixes are also used. Prefixes on verbs are usually reserved for obligatory pronoun incorporation, whereas verb suffixes denote many different things. There exist affixes, mainly suffixes, to denote gender, number, and noun classes in verbs.

Paumarí nouns are intrinsically categorized in two independent systems: gender and another system of two noun classes. There are two genders: masculine and feminine. If possible, gender assignment of a noun based on the referent's biological sex, and a few other generalizations can be made, but for the most part gender assignment is semantically opaque. Gender is not represented on the noun itself, but manifests in affixes that verbs, demonstratives, certain adjectives, and possessed nouns take to indicate agreement. Because first and second person pronouns take feminine agreement, it appears that feminine is the unmarked gender. In a transitive verb phrase, the verb agrees in gender with whichever of the agent or the object is the pivot of the discourse. In either case, the verb takes the suffix -hi for feminine agreement and -ha for masculine agreement:

ada ojoro-a bi-kamitha-'i-hi ida sinari bono-ni
DEM(M) turtle(M)-ERG 3SG.TR-hear-ASP-TH.FEM.AGR DEM(F) buriti(F) fruit(F)-FEM.POSS
'This turtle heard the buriti fruit (fall).'

ida ojoro-ra ka-karaga-'a-ha ada makhira
DEM(F) turtle(F)-OBJ NCL.AGR-find-ASP-TH.MASC.AGR DEM(M) man(M)
'A man found a turtle.'

The two classes in the other system of noun classes are called ka- class and non-ka-class, because the ka- class nouns cause certain other words to signal agreement with the prefix ka-. The semantic basis for assigning different nouns to these two classes is slightly less opaque than for gender: no abstract nouns are in the ka- class, and whether a concrete noun is in the ka- class roughly corresponds to whether its referent is large and flat, with certain semantic categories admitting other generalizations. A verb must take the prefix ka- if a particular argument is a ka-class noun; if the verb is in an intransitive clause that argument is the subject, whereas if it is in a transitive clause that argument is the object. Aside from verb-argument agreement, noun class agreement also occurs for modifying stative verbs, possessed nouns, and certain adjectives. This system of classifying nouns is eroding in the face of contact with Portuguese, with the agreement prefix often being left off of verbs in rapid speech.

== Syntax ==
Paumarí tends to be a head-final language. Typically, in intransitive phrases (those without direct objects) the order is VS. The SV intransitive order also occurs, although only when the Subject is marked for informational prominence (the demonstrative (DEM) is occluded in such SV phrases). In transitive phrases, the word order is mainly SVO, in which the ergative case marking system tends to be used. The affix used for ergative marking is the suffix -a, and the object of the sentence is preceded by a word denoting a demonstrative case. These demonstrative case nouns are either ada for male, or ida for female. The gender and number of the object noun, not the subject, dictates the gender and number suffixes on the verb.

Two other word orders that occur in Paumarí transitive phrases are OVS and SOV. In these cases, the object is marked with a suffix denoting it as such (-ra) and is placed directly before the verb. In these cases, it is thought that the accusative system has taken over, as the subject of the sentence no longer receives the ergative suffix -a and is free to occur at the beginning or end of the phrase (but not directly before the verb). This shows the split ergativity evident in Paumarí language – they employ the ergative system for some word orders and the accusative system for others.

Adjectives always follow the noun that they describe and if there is also a number in the clause, it follows the adjective (“Three big dogs” becomes "dogs big three"). The Paumarí language has very few words that act as adverbs, but several ways of changing other words into adverbs via affixes. Adverbs do not modify adjectives in the Paumarí language.

== Vocabulary ==
=== Portuguese contact ===
There are some portions of the Paumarí language that have been irreversibly changed by Portuguese influence. For example, Paumarí use Portuguese narrative words such as dai ("from there") and então ("then") often in their speech. Also, Paumarí have difficulty expressing equality/inequality within their own language. At the time of the 1964 SIL arrival, they used the Portuguese word mais ("more") in conjunction with adjectives to compare things and the researchers could not find anything in native Paumarí tongue that served the same function in their language. Often, root duplication serves as a way for the Paumarí to express that something is less like or becoming or trending towards another thing. This is an odd use of reduplication, as in many other languages, reduplication serves to strengthen the word; make it more immediate or intense. For adjectives, often the suffix –ki will be added to tag the word as descriptive. Reduplication of adjective roots denotes less of the description.

== Bibliography ==
- Chapman, Shirley; Derbyshire, Desmond C. (1991). "Paumarí". In Derbyshire, Desmond C.; Pullum, Geoffrey K. (eds.). Handbook of Amazonian languages, Volume 3. Mouton de Gruyter. pp. 161–352. ISBN 3-11-012836-5. OCLC 769476140.
- "Arawa"; in Dixon, Robert M. W.; The Amazonian Languages; pp. 293–305. ISBN 0-521-57021-2
- Everett, Daniel L. (2003). "Iambic feet in Paumarí". Linguistic Discovery. 2 (1): 22–44. doi:10.1349/PS1.1537-0852.A.263.
