= Tapauá River =

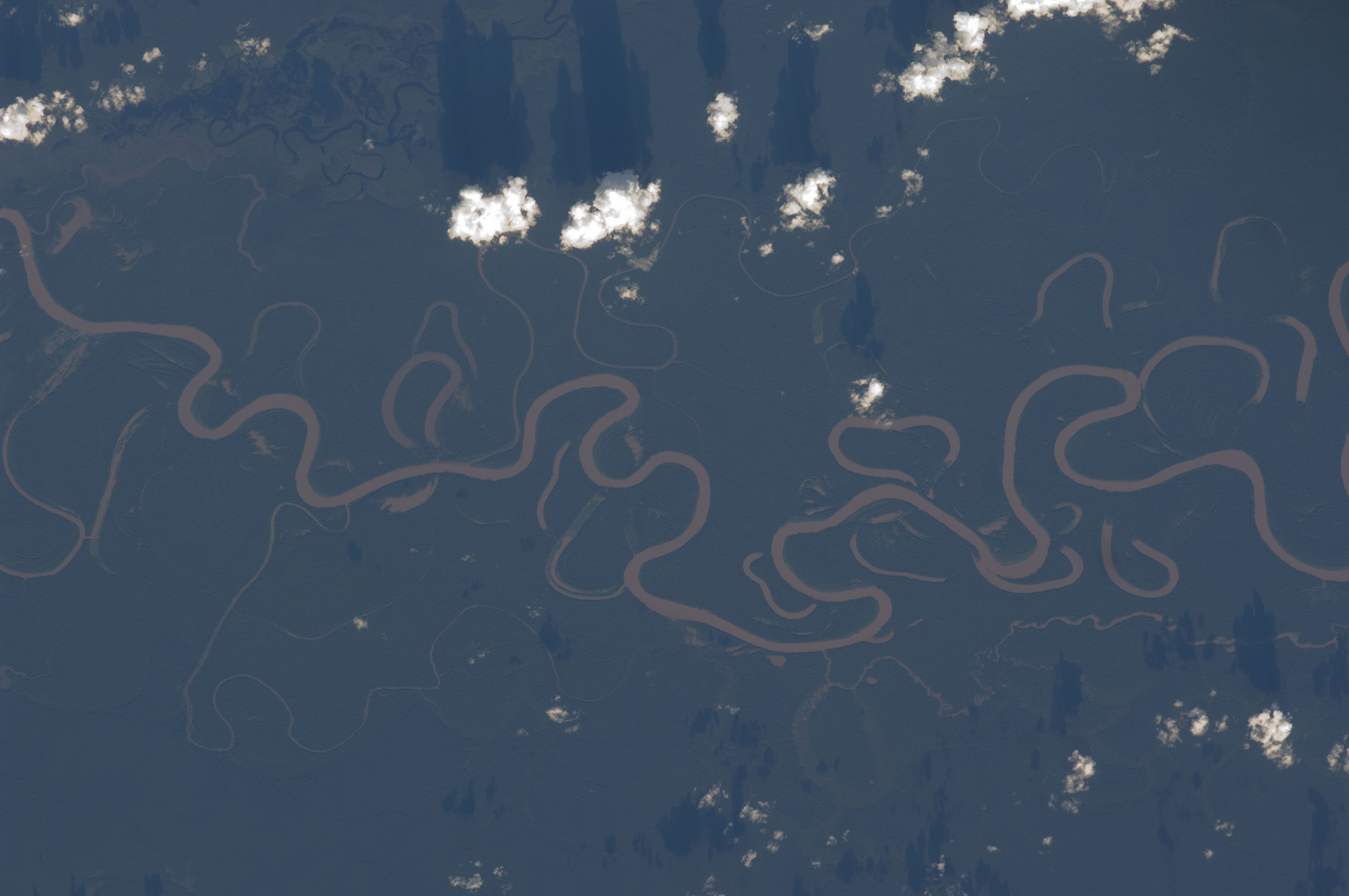

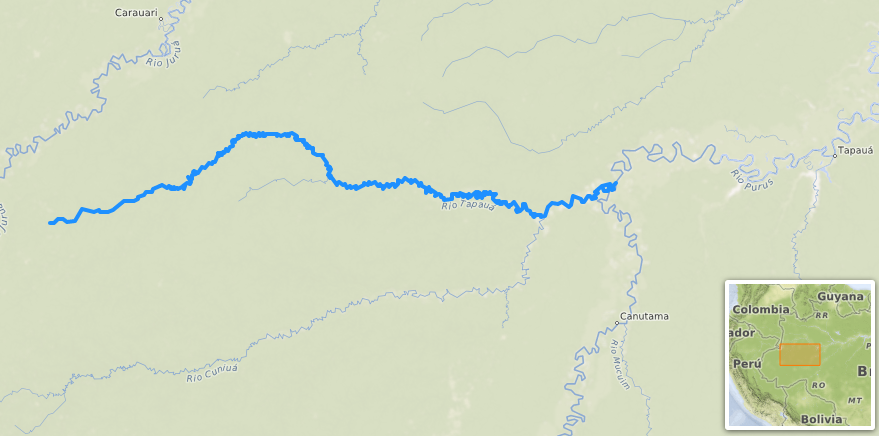
- Path of Rio Tapauá
- Native name: Rio Tapauá (Portuguese)

Location
- Country: Brazil

Physical characteristics
- Mouth
  - location: Purus River
  - coordinates: 5°46′42″S 64°23′58″W
- Length: 640 km (400 mi)
- Basin size: 63,185 km^{2} (24,396 mi^{2}) 63,164.6 km^{2} (24,388.0 mi^{2})
- Discharge
  - location: Confluence of Purus, Amazonas State
  - average: 2,135 m^{3}/s (75,400 cu ft/s) 1,840.899 m^{3}/s (65,010.7 cu ft/s)

Basin features
- River system: Purus River

The Tapauá River (Portuguese: Rio Tapauá) is a river of Amazonas state in north-western Brazil. It is a left tributary of the Purus River.

The river flows through the Juruá-Purus moist forests ecoregion.

== See also ==
- List of rivers of Amazonas
