= Deni language =

Arawan language spoken in Brazil

Deni
- Native to: Brazil
- Region: Amazonas
- Native speakers: 740 (2006)
- Language family: Arauan: Madihá; Deni

Language codes
- ISO 639-3: dny
- Glottolog: deni1241
- ELP: Dení

Deni (also Dení, Dani) is an Arawan language spoken in Brazil. Deni is very similar to the other languages of the Arawan language family, but is especially similar to the Jamamadi language.

== Phonology ==
=== Vowels ===
| | Front | Back |
|---|---|---|
| High | i | u |
| Low | ɛ | a |

- /ɛ/ can be heard as [e] in unstressed syllables.
- /a/ can be heard as [ɐ] in both stressed and unstressed positions when preceded or followed by a nasal in the same syllable, or in the onset position of the following syllable.

=== Consonants ===
| | | Labial | Alveolar | Velar | Glottal |
|---|---|---|---|---|---|
| Nasal | | m | n | | |
| Plosive | voiceless | p | t | k | (ʔ) |
| Plosive | aspirated | pʰ | tʰ | kʰ | |
| Plosive | voiced | b | d | | |
| Affricate | voiceless | | t͡s | | |
| Affricate | aspirated | | t͡sʰ | | |
| Affricate | voiced | | d͡z | | |
| Fricative | | v | | | h |
| Approximant | | | (l) | | |
| Tap | | | ɾ | | |

- /ɾ/ is in free variation with [l] among speakers.
- Affricate sounds /t͡s, d͡z/ may also be heard as fricative sounds [s, z] in free variation.
- A glottal stop [ʔ] is heard phonetically in syllable-coda position when the onset of the syllable is a voiced stop, or in a mid word-onset position followed by a vowel.
