= Indigenous peoples in Venezuela =

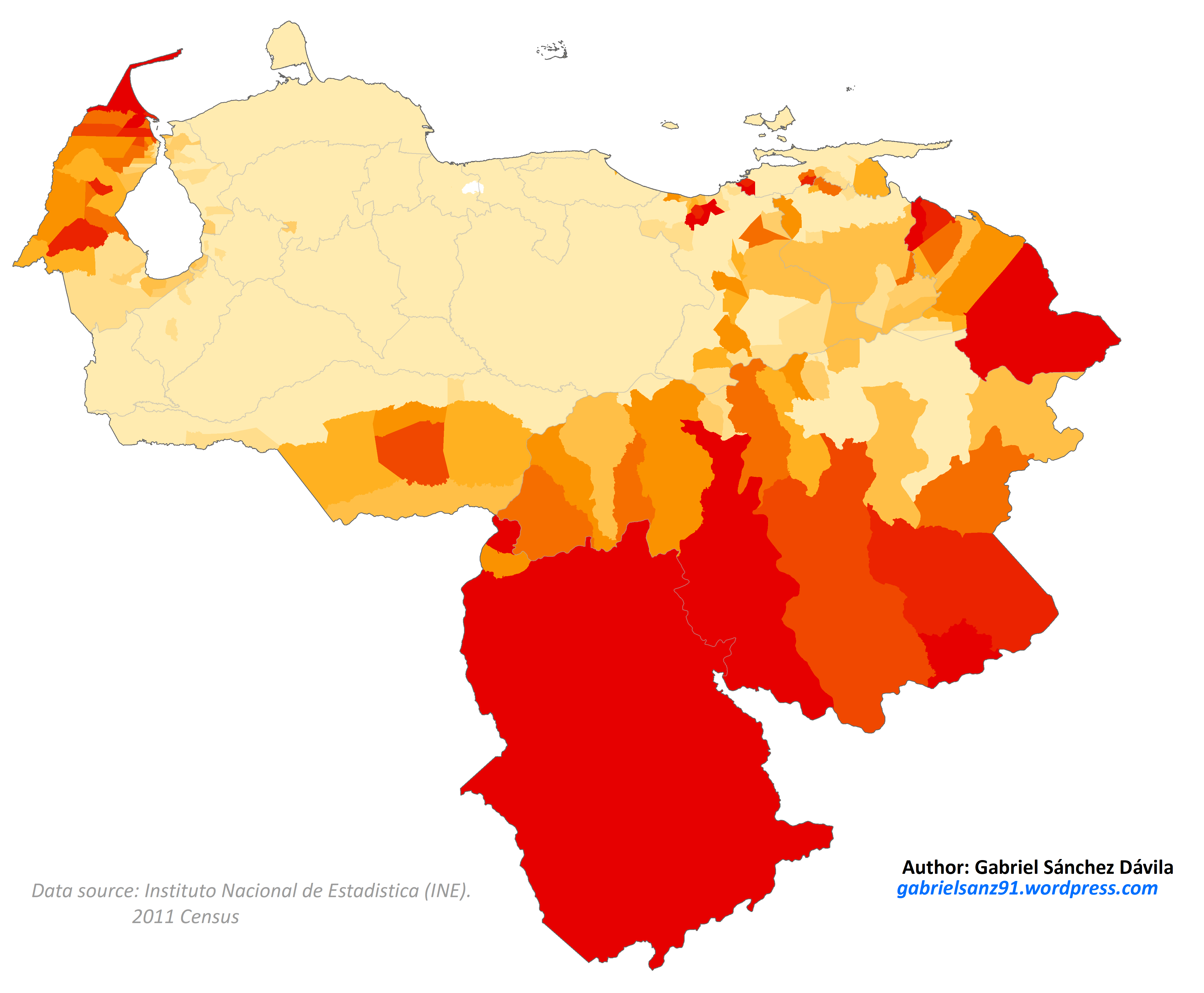
Distribution in percentages of the Amerindian population in Venezuela by municipality according to the 2011 census. < 1% 1–2.5% 2.5–5% 5–10% 10-20% 20-30% 30-40% 40-50% 50-60% > 60%

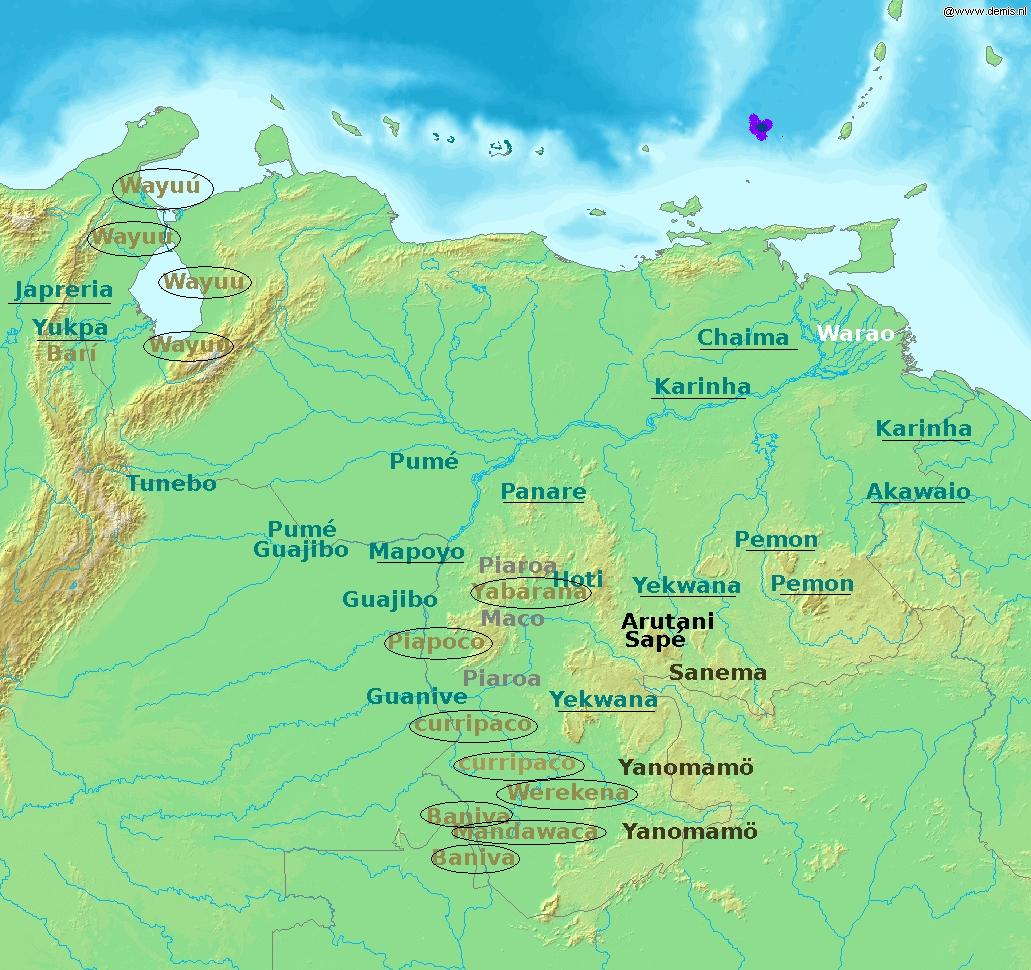
Most populous Indigenous groups in Venezuela

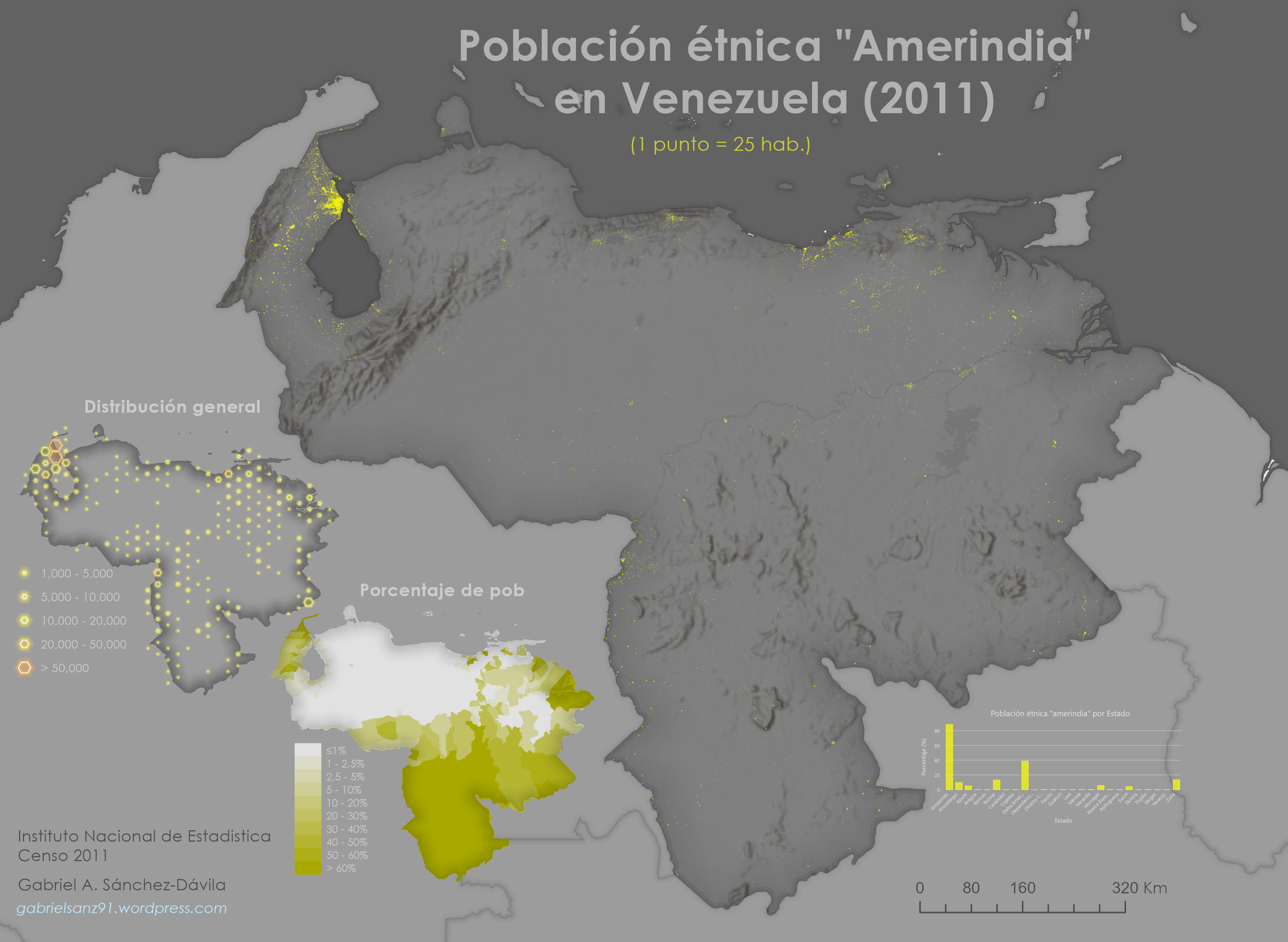
Distribution of Native Venezuelans nationwide according to the 2011 census

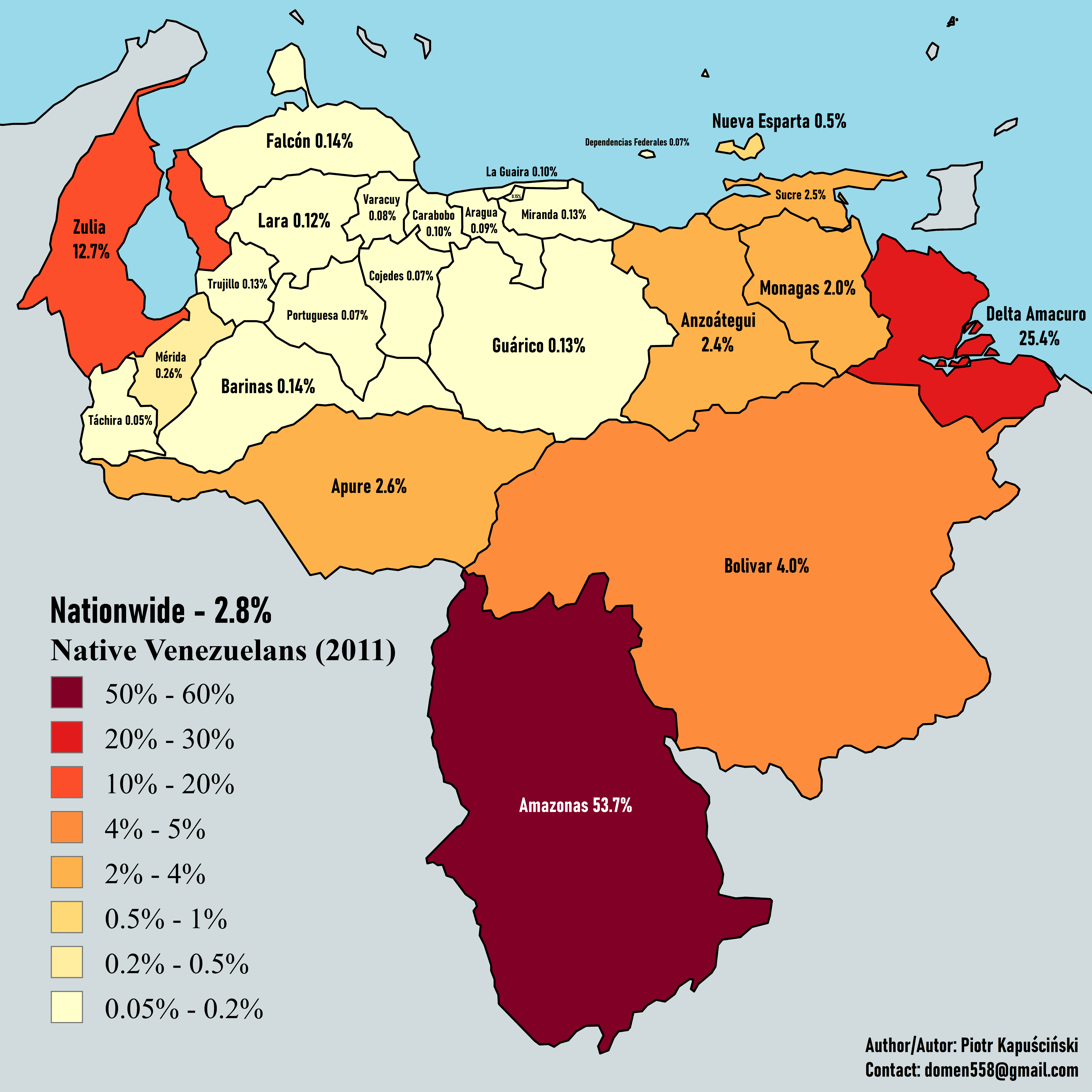
Distribution of Native Venezuelans by state according to the 2011 census, with percentages shown for each state

Indigenous people in Venezuela are Native peoples who live in Venezuela. Also called Amerindians or Native Venezuelans, they form about 2% of the population of Venezuela, and many Venezuelans have some Indigenous ancestry. Indigenous people are concentrated in the southern Amazon rainforest state of Amazonas, where they make up nearly 50% of the population, and in the Andes of the western state of Zulia.

At least 30 Indigenous ethnic groups live in Venezuela, including the Wayuu (413,000), Warao people (49,000), Kali'na (34,000), Pemon (30,000), Anu͂ (21,000), Huottüja (19,000), Ya̧nomamö (16,000), Yaruro (7,000), Ye'kuana (6,000), and Motilone Barí (3,000).

About 200,000 Wayuu people who live in Zulia between Lake Maracaibo and the Colombian border. Another 100,000 or so Indigenous people live in the sparsely populated southeastern states of Amazonas, Bolívar, and Delta Amacuro.

== History ==
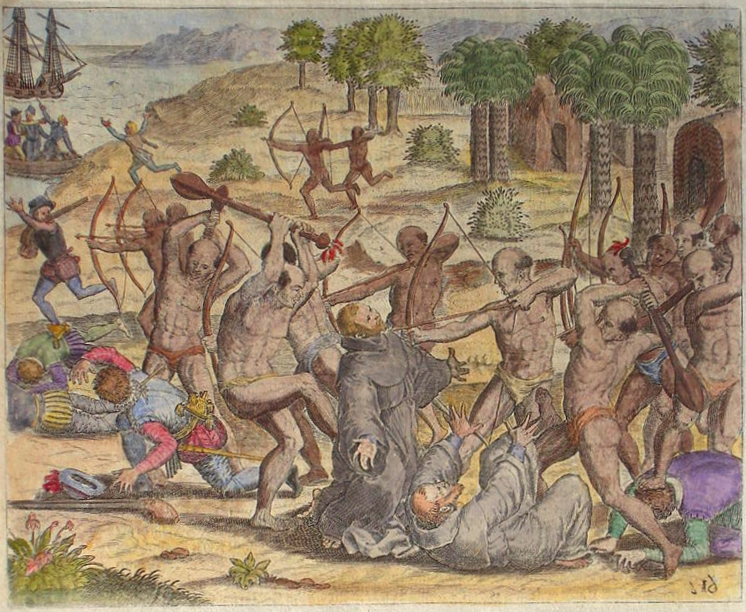
The Natives of Cumaná attack the mission after Gonzalo de Ocampo's slaving raid. Colored copperplate by Theodor de Bry, published in the "Relación brevissima de la destruccion de las Indias".

Evidence of human settlement in Venezuela date back at least to 13,000 BCE, and Archaic pre-ceramic cultures prevailed until about 200 BCE. Archeologists have discovered evidence of the earliest known inhabitants of the Venezuelan area in the form of leaf-shaped flake tools, together with chopping and scraping implements exposed on the high riverine terraces of the Pedregal River in western Venezuela. Late Pleistocene hunting artifacts, including spear tips, come from a similar site in northwestern Venezuela known as El Jobo. According to radiocarbon dating, these date from 13,000 to 7000 BCE. Taima-Taima, yellow Muaco and El Jobo in Falcón State are some of the sites that have yielded archeological material from these times. These groups co-existed with megafauna like megatherium, glyptodonts and toxodonts. The Manicuaroids pre-ceramic communities was formed, primarily in Punta Gorda and Manicuare that followed one another on the islands of the Margarita and Cubagua, off the eastern coast of Venezuela, and that seem to constitute a unique cultural tradition.The bone point, shell gouge, and two-pronged stone are characteristic in this places. About 5000 BCE, the archaeological site at Banwari Trace in southwestern Trinidad island is the oldest pre-Columbian site in the West Indies. At this time, Trinidad was still part of South America. Archaeological research of the site has also shed light on the patterns of migration of this pre ceramic peoples from mainland actual Eastern Venezuela to the Lesser Antilles between 5000 and 2000 BCE. In this period, hunters and gatherers of megafauna started to turn to other food sources and established the first tribal structures. The first ceramic-using people in Venezuelan were the Saladoid Indigenous, an Arawakan-speaking people who flourished from 500 BCE to 545 CE. The Saladoid were concentrated along the lowlands of the Orinoco River. Around 250 BCE entered Trinidad and Tobago to later moved north into the remaining islands of the Caribbean sea until Cuba and the Bahamas. After 250 CE a third group, called the Barrancoid people migrating up the Orinoco River toward Trinidad and other island of the Antilles navigating in wooden canoes. Following the collapse of Barrancoid communities along the Orinoco around 650 CE, a new group, called the Arauquinoid expanded up the river to the coast. The cultural artifacts of this group were encountered in the northeast Venezuela and only partly adopted in Trinidad and adjacent islands, and as a result, this culture is called Guayabitoid in these areas. The Timoto-Cuica culture was the most complex society in Pre-Columbian Venezuela; with pre-planned permanent villages, surrounded by irrigated, terraced fields and with tanks for water storage. Their houses were made primarily of stone and wood with thatched roofs. They were peaceful, for the most part, and depended on growing crops. Regional crops included potatoes and ullucos. They left behind works of art, particularly anthropomorphic ceramics, but no major monuments. They spun vegetal fibers to weave into textiles and mats for housing. They invented the arepa, a stuffed maize flatbread and a staple of Venezuelan cuisine.

Around 1300 CE, the Kalinago, a new group, appears to have settled in the Coast Range and Orinoco Delta where introduced new cultural attributes which largely replaced the Guayabitoid culture. Called the Mayoid cultural tradition, dividing their territory with the earlier Arawakan-speaking people, against whom they fought during their expansion toward the east and navigating the Lesser Antilles until Puerto Rico. They were prolific travelers even though they weren't nomads. This represents the Native Indigenous which were present in 1498 when Christopher Columbus arrived in Venezuela. Their distinct pottery and artifacts survive until 1800, but after this time they were largely assimilated into mainstream. It is not known how many people lived in Venezuela before the Spanish Conquest; it may have been around a million people and in addition to today's peoples included groups such as the Lokono, Kalina, Timoto-cuicas, Auaké, Caquetio, Mariche, Pemon, and Piaroa. The number was much reduced after the Conquest, mainly through the spread of new diseases from Europe. There were two main north-south axes of pre-Columbian population, producing maize in the west and manioc in the east. Large parts of the Llanos plains were cultivated through a combination of slash and burn and permanent settled agriculture. The Indigenous peoples of Venezuela had already encountered crude oils and asphalts that seeped up through the ground to the surface. Known to the locals as mene, the thick, black liquid was primarily used for medicinal purposes, as an illumination source and for the caulking of canoes. On the islands of Cubagua and Margarita off the northeastern coast of Venezuela, the Indigenous people as expert divers harvesting the pearls that normally used as ceremonial ornaments.

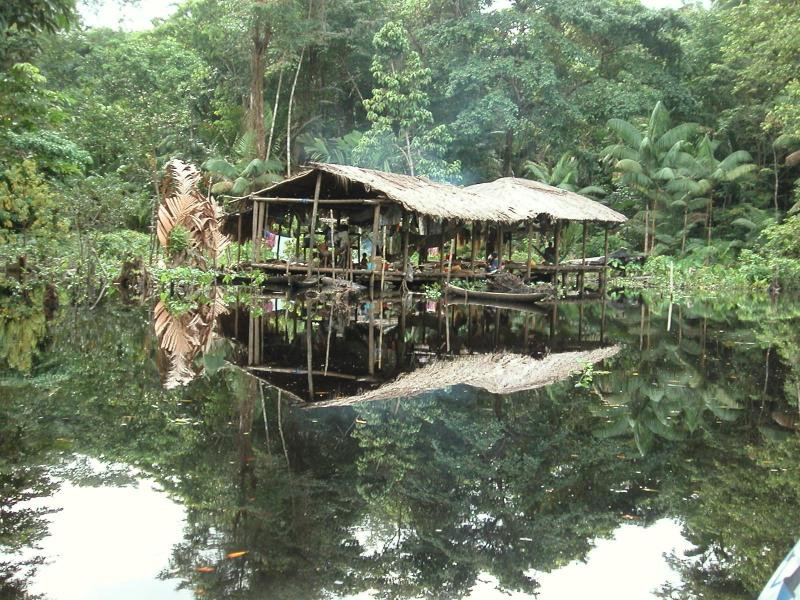
A palafito in the Orinoco Delta

The first SPanish explorers arrived in Venezuela on 31 July 1498.

Spain's colonization of mainland Venezuela started in 1514, establishing its first permanent South American settlement in the present-day city of Cumaná. The name "Venezuela" is said to derive from palafito villages discovered in 1499 on Lake Maracaibo reminding Amerigo Vespucci of Venice (hence "Venezuela" or "little Venice"). Amerindian caciques (leaders) such as Guaicaipuro (circa 1530–1568) and Tamanaco (died 1573) attempted to resist Spanish incursions, but the newcomers ultimately subdued them. Historians agree that the founder of Caracas, Diego de Losada, ultimately put Tamanaco to death. Some of the resisting tribes or the leaders are commemorated in place names, including Caracas, Chacao and Los Teques. The early colonial settlements focussed on the northern coast, but in the mid-eighteenth century the Spanish pushed further inland along the Orinoco River. Here the Ye'kuana (then known as the Makiritare) organised serious resistance in 1775 and 1776. Under Spanish colonization, several religious orders established mission stations. The Jesuits withdrew in the 1760s, while the Capuchins found their missions of strategic significance in the War of Independence and in 1817 were brutally taken over by the forces of Simon Bolivar. For the remainder of the 19th century, governments did little for Indigenous peoples and they were pushed away from the country's agricultural centre to the periphery.

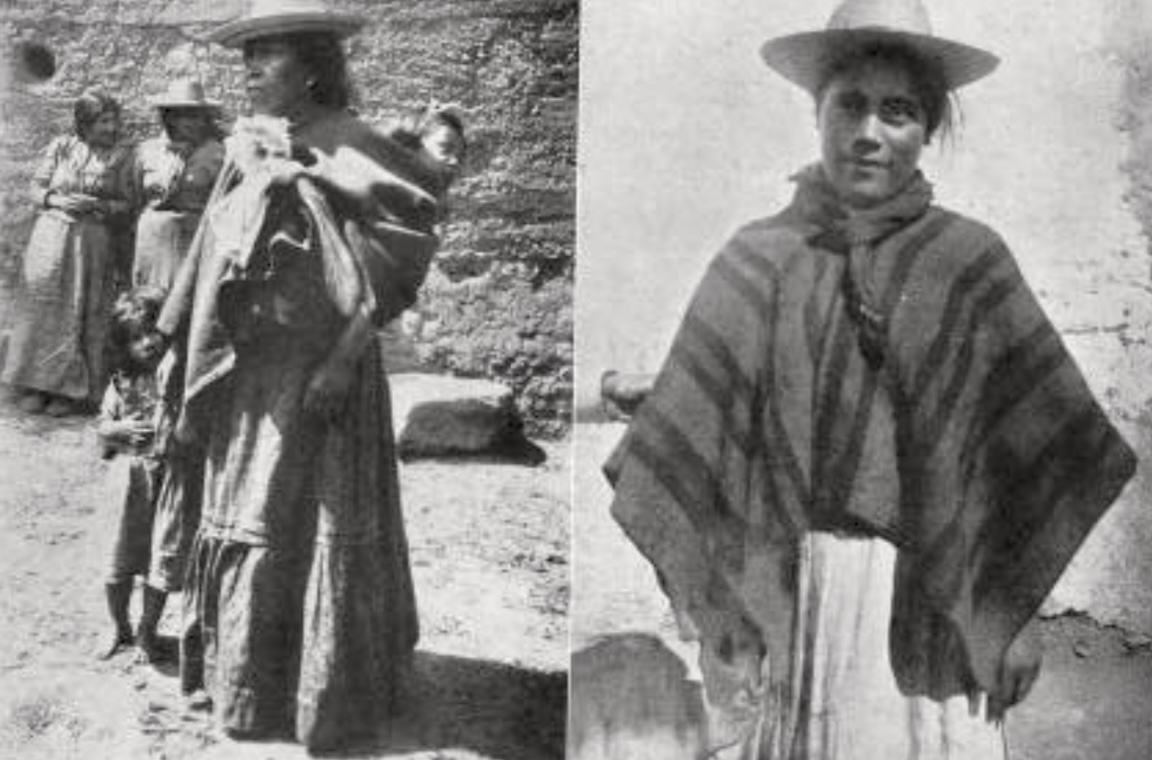
Mucuchí women, who were part of the greater Timoto–Cuica people

In 1913, during a rubber boom, Colonel Tomas Funes seized control of Amazonas's San Fernando de Atabapo, killing over 100 settlers. In the following nine years in which Funes controlled the town, Funes destroyed dozens of Ye'kuana villages and killed several thousand Ye'kuana.

The 1982 census reported an indigenous population of 140,600, with the Wayuu people being the largest at 52,000.

In October 1999, Pemon destroyed a number of electricity pylons constructed to carry electricity from the Guri Dam to Brazil. The Pemon argued that cheap electricity would encourage further development by mining companies. The $110 million project was completed in 2001.

== Political organization ==
The National Council of Venezuelan Indians (Consejo Nacional Indio de Venezuela, CONIVE) was formed in 1989 and represents the majority of Indigenous peoples, with 60 affiliates representing 30 peoples. In September 1999, Indigenous peoples "marched on the National Congress in Caracas to pressure the Constitutional Assembly for the inclusion of important pro-[Indigenous] provisions in the new constitution, such as the right to ownership, free transit across international borders, free choice of nationality, and land demarcation within two years."

== Legal rights ==
Before the 1999 constitution of Venezuela was ratified, legal rights for Indigenous peoples were increasingly lagging behind other Latin American countries, which were progressively enshrining a common set of Indigenous collective rights in their national constitutions. The 1961 constitution had been a step backward from the 1947 constitution, and the Indigenous rights law proposed in that constitution languished for decades, only passed in 1999.

Ultimately the 1999 constitutional process produced "the region's most progressive Indigenous rights regime". Innovations included Article 125's guarantee of political representation at all levels of government and Article 124's prohibition on "the registration of patents related to Indigenous genetic resources or intellectual property associated with Indigenous knowledge." The new constitution followed Colombia's example by reserving parliamentary seats for Indigenous delegates (three in Venezuela's National Assembly), and it was the first Latin American constitution to reserve Indigenous seats in state assemblies and municipal councils in districts with Indigenous populations.

== Peoples ==
Name	Alternate Names	Language Family	Population	Language	Number of Speakers (2011)	State
	Arawakan					
Achagua	Axagua	Arawakan	650–1,000	Achagua	250	Zulia
Añú	Paraujano	Arawakan	21,000	Paraujano	17,475	Zulia
Baré	Hanera, Werekena	Arawakan	5,000	Baré, Nheengatu, Werekena	100	Amazonas
Baniwa	Baniwua-wakuenaí	Arawakan	3,501	Karu	3,000	Amazonas
Caquetío		Arawakan	156,700	Caquetío	extinct	Zulia
Kurripako	Baniwua-walimanaí	Arawakan	7,351	Curripaco	6,000	Amazonas
Lokono	Lokono	Arawakan	10,000	Lokono	2,500	Amazonas
Wanikua	Wanicua	Arawakan	2,815	Wanikua	2,815	Amazonas
Wenaiwika	Piapoco	Arawakan	1,333	Piapoco	1,000	Amazonas
Warekena	Guarequena	Arawakan	200	Warekena	160	Amazonas
Wayú	Guajiros	Arawakan	413,437	Wayú	200,000	Zulia
	Yanomamis					
Yanomami	Yąnomamö, Yanomama	Yanomaman	9,289	Yanomamö	6,000 3,200	Amazonas
Sanumá	Guaika, Samatari-Chirichano	Yanomaman	1,500	Sanumá	5,100 (2006)	Bolívar
Yanam	Yanam-Ninam	Yanomaman	600	Yanam-xirianá	570	Bolívar
	Kalinagos/Caribs					
Pemón	Arekuna	Cariban	30,148	Pemón	30,000	Bolívar
Macuxi	Macusí	Cariban	89	Macushi	80	Bolívar
Kariña	Kali'na	Cariban	10,000	Kariña	4,450	Bolívar
Yekuana	Makiritare	Cariban	7,753	Yeꞌkuana	5,500	Bolívar
Eñepá	Panare	Cariban	4,688	Panare	1,200	Bolívar
Yukpa	Macoitas-Irokas	Cariban	10,424	Yukpa	7,500	Zulia
Japrería		Cariban	95	Japrería	90	Zulia
Akawayo	Waika-Waicá	Cariban	6,000	Akawayo	5,986	Amazonas
Yabarana	Yawarana	Cariban	440	Yabarana	30	Amazonas
Mapoyo	Yahuana-Wanai	Cariban	400	Mapoyo	04	Amazonas
Cumanagoto	Chaima	Cariban	4,000	Cumanagoto	Extinct Language (†)	Sucre
Quiriquire		Cariban	Extinct (†)	No data	Extinct Language (†)	Monagas
Mariche		Cariban	Extinct (†)	No data	Extinct Language (†)	Caracas
Cumanagoto	Kumanagoto	Cariban	50,000	Cumanagoto Itoto Majun	100	Anzoátegui
Chagaragoto	Guarena	Cariban	Extinct (†)	No data	Extinct Language (†)	Caracas
Meregotos		Cariban	Extinct (†)	No data	Extinct Language (†)	Caracas; Aragua; Carabobo
Caraca		Cariban	Extinct (†)	No data	Extinct Language (†)	Caracas
Toromaima		Cariban	Extinct (†)	No data	Extinct Language (†)	Caracas
Characuales	Chotokon Patarü Tawatamase	Cariban	96	Cumanagoto	05	Anzoátegui
Teques		Cariban	Extinct (†)	No data	Extinct Language (†)	
	Timoto-Cuicas					
Timoto	Timote-timoti	Timoto-cuicas	Extinct (†)	Timote	Extinct Language (†)	Mérida
Cuica	Kuika	Timoto-cuica	Extinct (†)	Cuica	Extinct Language (†)	Trujillo
	Chibchas					
Barí	Dobocubi, Motilón-Barí	Chibchan	2,841	Barí	2,000	Zulia
Chitarero	Dobocubi, Motilón-Barí	Muisca		Barí		Zulia
	Salibanas					
Wirö	Macú-Wirö, Wirö-Itoto, Itoto, Jojod	Piaroa–Saliban	2,500	Wirö	2,000	Amazonas
Sáliba	Sáliva	Piaroa–Saliban	344	Saliba	344	Amazonas
Piaroa	Wötjüja, Dearwa	Piaroa–Saliban	19,293	Piaroa	10,000	Amazonas
	Guahibas					
Guahibo-Jiwi	Guahibo-Sikuani, Hiwi	Guajiboan	23,953	Sikuani-Wahibo-Hiwi	8,428	Apure; Amazonas
Cuiba	Wamonae	Guajiboan	428	Cuiba	400	Apure
	Jirajaranas					
Jirajara	Xirahara-Jirara	Jirajaranan	34	Jirajara	Extinct Language (†)	Falcón
Ayamán	Ayomán	Jirajaranan	214	Ayomán	Extinct Language (†)	Lara
Gayón	Gayones	Jirajaranan	1,033	Gayón	Extinct Language (†)	Lara
	Tupi-Guaranis					
Ñe'engatú	Yeral-Ñengatú	Tupí	2,130	Ñe'engatú	2,000	Amazonas
	No linguistic connection					
Warao	Waro	Warao	49,271	Warao	4,066	Delta Amacuro; Monagas; Sucre
Waikerí	Guaiquerí	Waikerí	1,900	Waikerí	Extinct Language (†)	Nueva Esparta; Sucre
Yaruro	Pumé	Esmeralda–Yaruroan (proposed)	7,269	Yaruro	4,500	Apure; Guárico; Bolívar
Sapé	Kaliana	Sapé	08	Sapé	01	Bolívar
Auaké	Awakí-Orotani, Arutani-Uruak	Arutani–Sape	15	Arutani	02	Bolívar
Jukude-itse		Máku language	Extinct (†)	isolate	Extinct Language (†)	Amazonas
Puinave	Wãênsöjöt	Linguistic isolate	1,716	Puinave Norí	3,000	Amazonas
Hodï	Jodï, Chicamo Yuana, Waru-wa-ru	Duho	982	Hoti	900	Amazonas

== Languages ==
The main language families are

- Arawakan languages
- Carib languages
- Chibchan languages

== See also ==
- Panare people

== Works cited ==
- Diamond, Larry; Linz, Juan; Lipset, Seymour, eds. (1989). Democracy In Developing Countries: Latin America. Vol. 4. Lynne Rienner Publishers. ISBN 1555870430.
