= Wirö =

Indigenous people in Venezuela and Colombia

Total population
- Venezuela: 345 (2020)

Regions with significant populations
- Venezuela, Colombia

Languages
- Wirö language

Religion
- Indigenous religion

Related ethnic groups
- Piaroa

The Wirö are an Indigenous people of Venezuela and eastern Colombia. In 2020, 345 Wirö lived in Venezuela and none lived in cities.

== Language ==
The Wirö speak the Wirö language, a Piaroa–Saliban language that is closely related to Piaroa. The two languages are somewhat mutually intelligible.

== Names ==
They are also known as the Mako-Wirö, Sáliba-Maco, Itoto, and Jojod.

== Territory ==
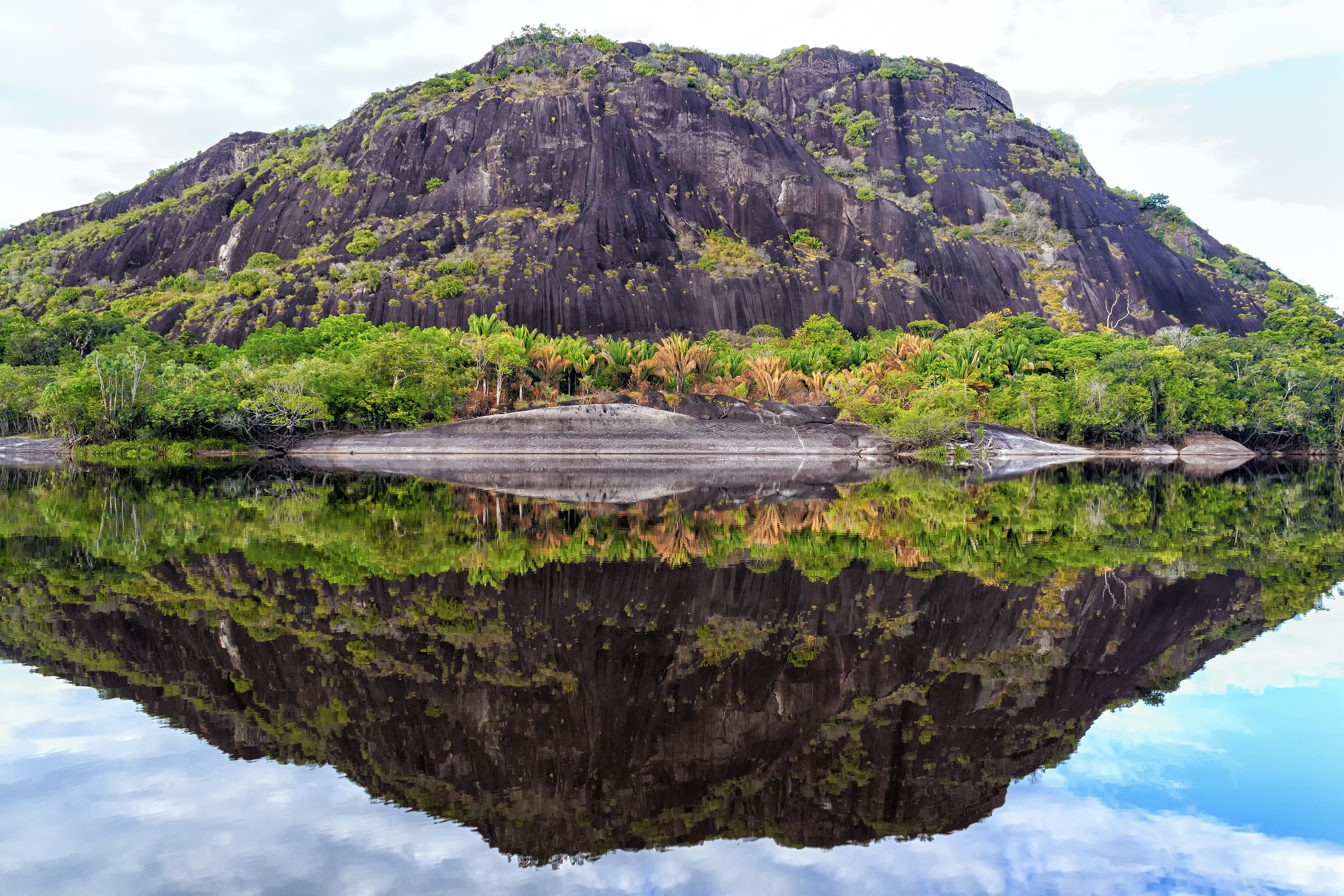
Sipapo River in Venezuela

The Wirö live in the Orinoco Basin, particularly in mountainous areas near the Piaroa and Salibá people.

Piaroa oral history states the Wirö originally lived through the basin of the Anaveni River, between the Uniana and Sipapu mountains. The Wirös' name for their place of origin is Wirö Märiweka. In 1830, they lived near the Piaroa, Mapoyo, Yabarana, Guahibo, and Puinavi peoples. In 1945 and 1948, anthropologists noted that the Wirö lived along tributaries to the Ventuari River between the Guapuchí and Maigualida rivers. In the 1950s, they lived along tributaries of the Marieta River, and by 1958 they lived along the Sipapo and Manapiare rivers.

== Culture ==
Historically, they produced curare, a poison used on arrow tips to temporarily paralyze animals when hunting.

They were trading partners with the Piaroa and provided peramán (a type of resin) and torches. They are often confused with the Piaroa since they share many cultural practices.

They share the Warime ceremony with the Piaroa, which involves wearing masks and playing flutes. Warime likely predates European contact and is related to the Yurupari ceremony. They also celebrate the harvest of peach palm (Bactris gasipaes) and other fruits in masked ceremonies.
