= Arequena language =

Arequena language may refer to:

- Urequena language, an extinct language related to Andoque
- Warekena language, an Arawakan language
