= Panare =

Panare may refer to

- Panare people, Venezuela
- Panare language, Venezuela
- Panare District, Thailand
