= Hodï–Saliban languages =

Proposed language family

Hodï–Saliban
- (proposed)
- Geographic distribution: Northwestern Amazon
- Linguistic classification: Proposed as one of the world's primary language families
- Subdivisions: Hodï; Piaroa–Saliban; ?Betoi–Jirara †; ?Ticuna–Yuri

Language codes
- Glottolog: jodi1234 (retired)

Jodï–Saliban is a proposed language family of South America, uniting the Hodï, Piaroa–Saliban, and possibly Betoi–Jirara languages and language families. Marcelo Jolkesky (2016) adds Ticuna–Yuri to the proposal, creating a proposal he calls Duho; he had previously connected Andoque to the grouping in a Macro-Daha family.

Zamponi (2017) concludes that the similarities between Saliban and Hodɨ appear to be due to contact, but that a distant genealogical relationship between Betoi and Sáliban is plausible though not demonstrated. He does not address Ticuna–Yuri.

== Prehistory ==
Jolkesky (2016) suggests that the homeland of Proto-Duho was in the Serranía de Chiribiquete.

== Language contact ==
Jolkesky (2016) notes that there are lexical similarities with Chibchan languages due to contact, which may point to the earlier presence of Chibchan speakers in the Orinoco basin.

== Classification ==
Internal classification of the Duho language family by Jolkesky (2016):

- Duho
  - Tikuna-Yuri
    - Karabayo
    - Tikuna
    - Yuri †
  - Saliba-Hodi
    - Hodi
    - Saliba-Betoi
      - Betoi–Jirara †
      - Saliba-Piaroa
        - Saliba
        - Piaroa-Mako
          - Ature †
          - Wirö (Maco)
          - Piaroa

== Pronouns ==
Jolkesky's Duho languages have shared forms in *ʧ for "I", *kʷ for "you" and *t for "we", which are found in all languages.

language	I	thou	he	she	we	they
Ticuna	ʧò-	ku-	dĩ-	ɡĩ- /i-	tò-	ta-́
Yuri	tshuu	wikú	di	-	too	-
Saliba	ʧ-	ũku, kʷ-	Ø-, i-, -di	x-, -x	t-	h-
Piaroa	ʧ(u)-	(u)ku, kʷ-	Ø-, -de	hʷ-, -h	t(u)-	tʰ(a)-
Wirö	ʧ(V)-	ɯkʷɯ, kʷ(V)-	Ø-	h(V)-, -h	d(V)-, -dɯtʰɯ	tʰ(V)-
Hodi	ʰtæ	ʰkæ	dæ	-	ʰtai	hai
Betoi–Jirara	r(u)-	uhu, h(u)-	Ø-, -ri	Ø-	r-, -nuto	?

== Lexicon ==
Several basic words in Duho languages appear to be related. The following examples are given, with further parallels in Sape:

language	tree	mouth	head	hair	path	eat	spirit	offspring	breast	who	what
Ticuna	dãi	àː	èrú	ʧi	bã̀	ɡõ̀ː	ã́ẽ̀	dẽ́	biĩ́	tèẽ́	tàː
Yuri	noi	i à	gerühó	ii	-mó	-	-	o nné	-	-	-
Saliba	-	aha	iʤu	-	maa(-na)	ikua	õãĩ	nẽ(-ẽ)	omixe	ã-diha	ã-daha
Piaroa	dawi	æ	u(-ju)	-ʦˀe	mæ(-næ)	ku	ãẽ	ĩtʰĩ	ami	di	dæhe
Wirö	towi	a	u; -ʤu	-ˀʤe	ma(-na)	ku(-õ)	-	ĩtʰĩ	omu	ti	tahi
Hodi	ʰtawɯ	a	ʰtu	-	ma(-na); -ma	ʰku-õ	ãwẽ(-no)	ĩni	me(e)	-	-
(Sape)	tapa	itu	koyanukú, moynaku	pa	mu	ko/ku	-	katona	wi	pante	pemente
