= Wirö language =

Piaroan language spoken in South America

Wirö
- Maco
- Native to: Venezuela and Colombia
- Ethnicity: Wirö
- Native speakers: 1,100 (2017)
- Language family: Piaroa–Saliban: Piaroan; Wirö
- Writing system: Latin

Language codes
- ISO 639-3: wpc
- Glottolog: maco1239
- ELP: Mako
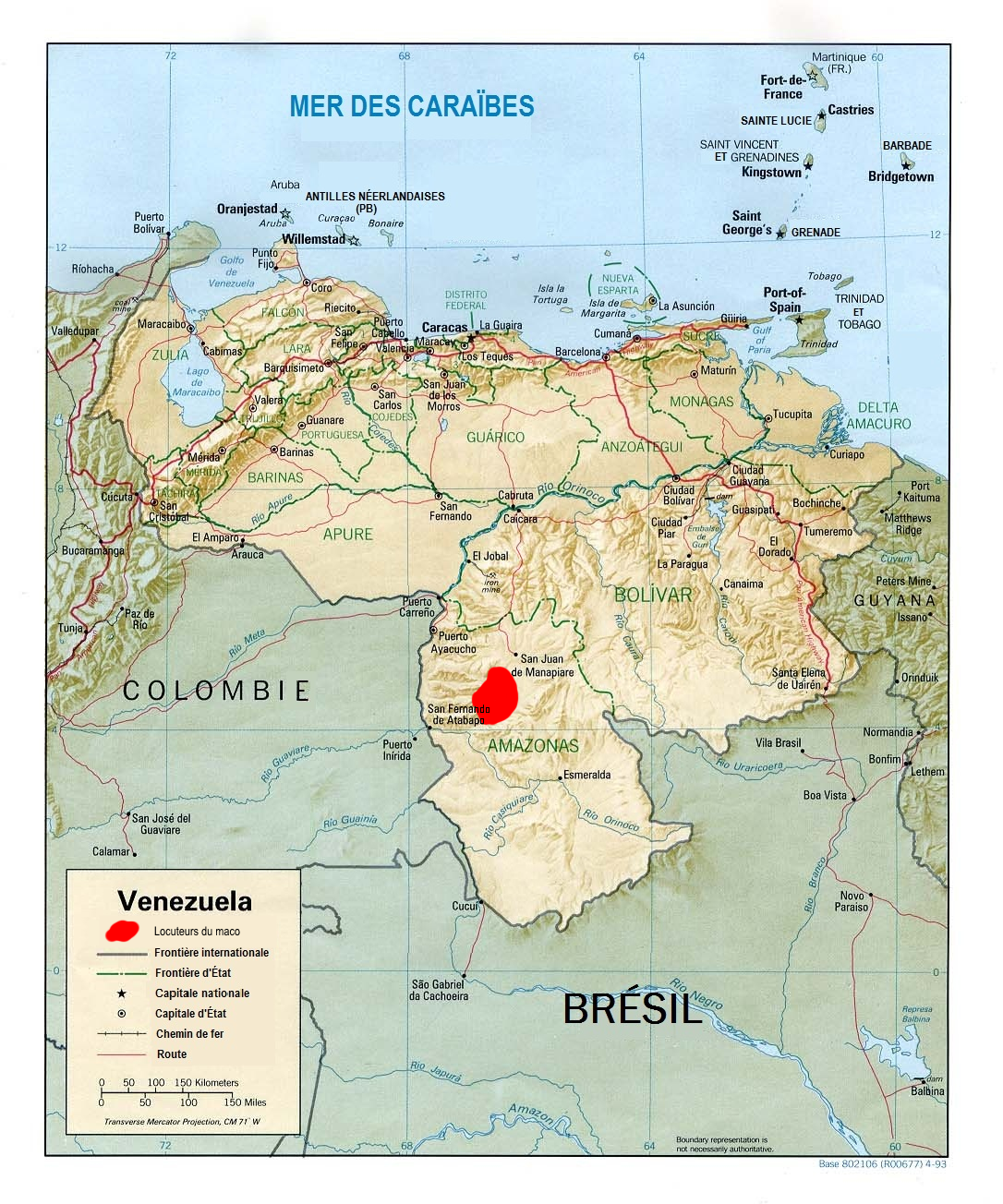
- Map of the Maco language

Wirö (also called Itoto, Jojod, or various forms of Maku, especially Mako-Wirö) is an Indigenous language of Venezuela and Colombia spoken by the Wirö people. Until it was properly documented in 2015, it was attested only by a list of 38 words collected ca. 1900, though even that was enough to show it was closely related to Piaroa. Speakers of the two understand each other, though not reliably, and consider them to be distinct languages.

== Classification ==
The Wirö language and the related Piaroa and Saliba language are subdivision of the proposed language family Piaro-Saliban, or simply Sáliban or Sálivan in Spanish. Wirö is somewhat mutually intelligible with Piaroa, and the Piaroa and Wirö have long been trading partners.

Marcelo Jolkesky proposed the Duho language family which would include Piaroa, Mako (Wirö), and the extinct Ature language as well as Saliba and other languages.

== Name ==
The language is known by several names, including Mako-Wirö, also written mako wirö in Spanish.

Maco is not a proper name but a label applied by Arawakan speakers for unintelligible languages. In the case of Wirö, the following forms are found in the literature: Maco, Mako, Maku, Makú, Sáliba-Maco, and Maco-Piaroa, the latter also for the combination of Wirö and Piaroa.

== Geographical location ==
The Wirö language is primarily spoken in the Orinoco River basin in Venezuela, with some speakers in Colombia. Along with Piaroa and Saliba, the language is spoken in settlements along the Cataniapo, Parguaza, Sipapo, and Ventuari rivers. Piaroa oral history originally places the Wirö in the Anaveni River basin, which is between the Parguaza and Cantaniapo rivers.

While many neighboring tribes merged into larger tribes, since 1830 the Wirö and Piaroa, as well as the Mapoyo, and Yabarana (Cariban language–speakers) survived. Czech linguist Čestmír Loukotka (1968) reported it being spoken on the Ventuari River and Cunucunuma River.

While the Wirö language is primarily spoken in Venezuela, it is also spoken in the departments of Guaviare and Vichada in eastern Colombia.
