= Warekena language =

Warekena language may refer to the following Arawakan languages spoken by the Warekena people:

- Warekena dialect of Baniwa of Guainía
- Warekena Velha language

== See also ==
- Urequena language, a dialect of Andoque
