= Jirajaran languages =

Language family of western Venezuela

Jirajaran
- Hiraháran
- Geographic distribution: Western Venezuela
- Extinct: early 20th century
- Linguistic classification: One of the world's primary language families
- Subdivisions: Jirajara; Ayomán; Gayón

Language codes
- Glottolog: jira1235
- Linguasphere: 81-IAA
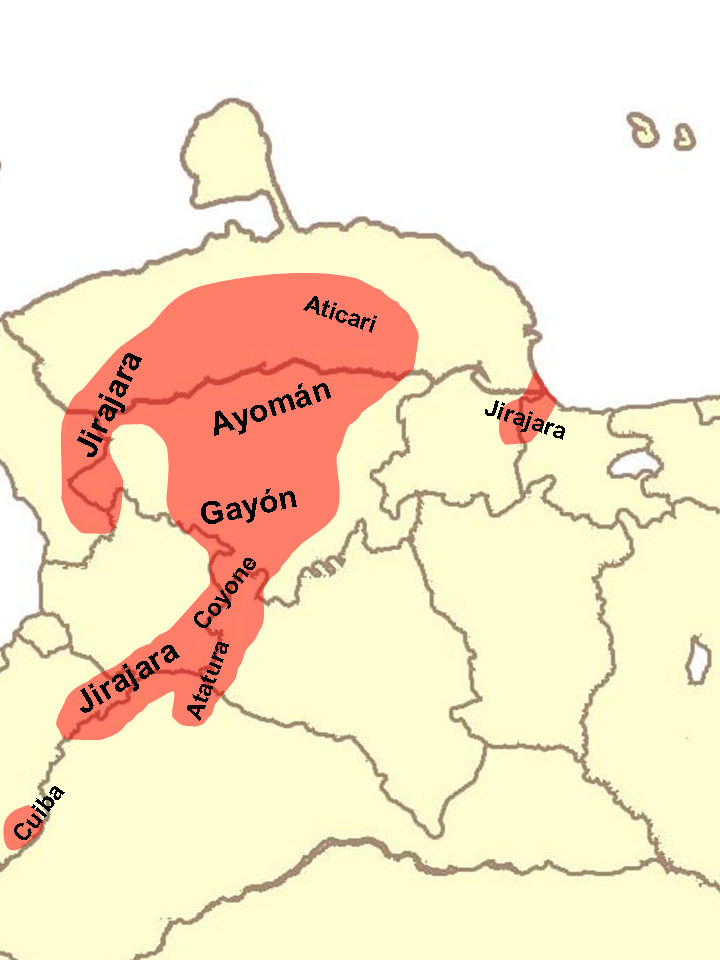
- Pre-contact distribution of the Jirajaran languages

The Jirajaran languages are a group of extinct languages once spoken in western Venezuela in the regions of Falcón and Lara. All of the Jirajaran languages appear to have become extinct in the early 20th century. According to Glottolog, its languages constitute a language isolate.

== Languages ==
Based on adequate documentation, three languages are definitively classified as belonging to the Jirajaran family:

- † Jirajara, spoken in the state of Falcón
- † Ayomán, spoken in the village of Siquisique in the state of Lara
- † Gayón, spoken at the sources of the Tocuyo River in the state of Lara

Loukotka includes four additional languages, for which no linguistic documentation exists:

- Coyone, spoken at the sources of the Portuguesa River in the state of Portuguesa, sometimes considered a synonym for Gayon
- Cuiba, spoken near the city of Aricagua
- Atatura, spoken between the Rocono and Tucupido rivers
- Aticari, spoken along the Tocuyo River

Mason (1950) lists:

- Gayón (Cayon)
- Ayomán
- Xagua (not to be confused with Achawa language)
  - Cuiba (?)
- Jirajara

== Classification ==
The Jirajaran languages are generally regarded as isolates. Adelaar and Muysken note certain lexical similarities with the Timotean languages and typological similarity to the Chibchan languages, but state that the data is too limited to make a definitive classification. Jahn, among others, has suggested a relation between the Jirajaran language and the Betoi languages, mostly on the basis of similar ethnonyms. Greenberg and Ruhlen classify Jirajaran as belonging to the Paezan language family, along with the Betoi languages, the Páez language, the Barbacoan languages and others.

== Language contact ==
Jolkesky (2016) notes that there are lexical similarities with the Sape, Timote-Kuika, and Puinave-Kak language families due to contact.

== Typology ==
Based on the little documentation that exists, a number of typological characteristics are reconstructible:

1. VO word order in transitive clauses

apasi mamán
I.cut my.hand
'I cut my hand'

2. Subjects precede verbs

depamilia buratá
the.family is.good
'The family is good'

3. Possessors which precede the possessed

shpashiú yemún
arc its.rope
'the arc of the rope'

4. Adjectives follow the nouns they modify

pok diú
hill big
'big hill'

5. Numerals precede the nouns they quantify

boque soó
one cigarette
'one cigarette'

6. Use of postpositions, rather than prepositions

angüi fru-ye
I.go Siquisique-to
'I go to Siquisique.'

== Vocabulary comparison ==
Jahn (1927) lists the following basic vocabulary items.

Comparison of Jirajaran vocabulary, based on Jahn (1927)
English	Ayomán	Gayón	Jirajara
fire	dug	dut, idú	dueg
foot	a-sengán	segué	angán
hen	degaró	digaró	degaró
house	gagap	hiyás	gagap
snake	huhí, jují	jují	túb
sun	iñ	yivat	yuaú
