= Auaké =

Auaké may refer to:

- Auaké people, an ethnic group of the Amazon
- Auaké language, their language
