= Joanna Overing =

American anthropologist

- Born: August 12, 1938; Takoma Park, Maryland, United States
- Education: M.A. in History, University of Connecticut; Ph.D. in Anthropology Brandeis University
- Alma mater: Duke University; University of Connecticut; Brandeis University
- Occupation: Anthropologist

Joanna Overing (born August 12, 1938 in Takoma Park, Maryland) is an American anthropologist based in Scotland. She has conducted research on egalitarianism, indigenous cosmology, philosophical anthropology, aesthetics, the ludic and linguistics through fieldwork in Amazonia. She has extensively studied indigenous Piaroa people in the Orinoco basin of Venezuela.

== Academic career ==
Overing completed her B.A. at Duke University and the University of Connecticut in History, followed by her M.A. in History from the University of Connecticut. She completed her Ph.D. in Anthropology at Brandeis University. She is Professor Emeritus at the University of St Andrews in the Department of Social Anthropology, and a Researcher within the Centre for Amerindian, Latin American and Caribbean Studies. She has previously held posts as Professor and Chair in Social Anthropology at the Department of Social Anthropology, University of St Andrews and Director of Centre of Indigenous American Studies and Exchange (CIASE), as well as teaching positions at Vanderbilt University and the London School of Economics.

== Influence in Anthropology ==
One of Overing's central interests in Amazonianist anthropology is the relationship between egalitarianism and individualism in Amerindian societies. Anthropologist Harry Walker has written that Overing 'pioneered the study of what she termed the “art of living” or the “aesthetics of everyday life,” showing how the Western distinction between ethics and aesthetics is irrelevant in a world where people strive for beauty in their social relations with others.'

== Selected publication ==
=== Books ===
- Overing Kaplan, Joanna (1975). The Piaroa; a people of the Orinoco Basin: A study of kinship and marriage. Oxford: Clarendon Press.
- Overing, Joanna, ed (1985). ASA Monographs: Vol. 24. Reason and Morality. London, New York: Tavistock Publications.
- Overing, Joanna and Nigel Rapport (2000). Social and Cultural Anthropology: The Key Concepts. London, New York: Routledge.
- Overing, Joanna and Alan Passes, eds (2000). The Anthropology of Love and Anger: The Aesthetics of Conviviality in Native Amazonia. London: Routledge. (ISBN 978-0415224185)

=== Articles and Chapters ===
- Overing Kaplan, Joanna (1973). 'Endogamy and the Marriage Alliance: A Note on Continuity in Kindred-Based Groups' in Man 8:4, 555-570.
- Overing Kaplan, Joanna (1981). 'Review: "Amazonian Anthropology"' in Journal of Latin American Studies, 13:1, 151-165.
- Overing, Joanna (1989). 'Personal Autonomy and the Domestication of Self in Piaroa Society' in Acquiring Culture: Cross Cultural Studies in Child Development, 169-192. London: Croom Helm.
- Overing, Joanna (1990). 'The Shaman as a Maker of Worlds: Nelson Goodman in the Amazon' in Man 25: 4, 602-619.
- Overing, Joanna (1997). 'The Role of Myth: An Anthropological Perspective', in G. Hosking and G. Schopflin (eds), Myths and Nationhood, Routledge, London.

== Bibliography ==
- Els Lagrou; Luisa Elvira Belaunde (2024). "O multiverso predatório dos deuses canibais: o legado de Joanna Overing". Journal de la Société des Américanistes (in Spanish). 110 (1): 147–164. doi:10.4000/12kih.
- Carlos D. Londoño Sulkin (2024). "Love and anger in Amazonia and in academia: a disciple's account of Joanna Overing's oeuvre and teachings". Journal de la Société des Américanistes. 110 (1): 165–186. doi:10.4000/12kie.
