= Hodï =

Indigenous people who live in the Amazonas basin

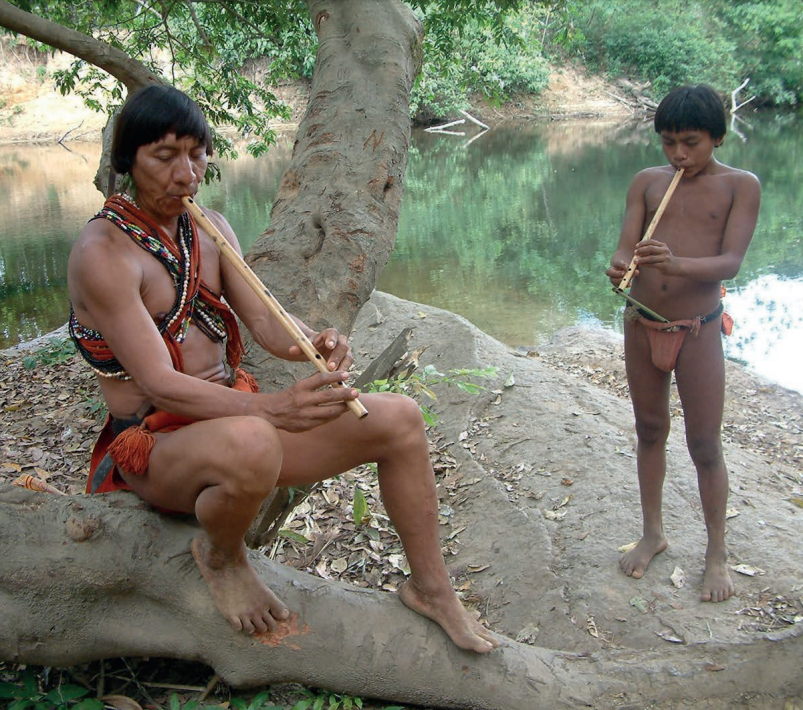
- Jotï flute players on the banks of Kayamá river, Bolívar State (2007)

Total population
- 982 (2011)

Languages
- Hodï language

Religion
- Shamanism

The Hodï or Jotï (from the Hodï word for "people") are a small group of indigenous people who live in the Amazon rainforest in Venezuela.

== Description ==
The last census held in Venezuela, in 2011, registered 982 individuals identifying as Hodï; a 2016 estimate accounted a population of around 1200. They speak the Hodï language and are closely related to the Piaroa people, although linguistic connections between the two people groups have not reached consensus among scholars. They are also known by a number of exonyms as the Hoti, Chicano, Shikana, Yuana, Waruwarú, or Rua.

The Hodï were one of the last indigenous peoples to make contact with non-indigenous settlers in Venezuela. Their presence in the Sierra de Maigualida area, between the Amazonas and Bolívar states, was first attested by European sources in 1913 through accounts from Ye'kuana people, who referred to the Hodï as Waruwadu.

The Hodï are primarily hunter-gatherers who follow seasonal nomadic patterns. The two largest settlements populated by Hodï have been established by Christian missionaries: San José de Kayamá (established by Catholic missionaries) and Caño Iguana (established by Evangelical missionaries). Some of the main crops in Hodï agriculture are plantain, maize, cassava, yam and sweet potato, among others. Overall, the Hodï grow over 67 plant species, of which 36 are used for food, 20 for ritualistic or medicinal purposes, and 11 for constructing artifacts.

== Bibliography ==
Media related to Hoti people at Wikimedia Commons

- Coppens, Walter (1983). "Los Hoti". Los Aborígenes de Venezuela. Vol. II (in Spanish). Caracas: Fundación La Salle / Monte Ávila Editores. pp. 243–301. OCLC 1053900925.
- Keogh, Frederick Karl (1994). Where rocks grow and God has shoes: Reflections and shifting realities in the Venezuelan Amazon (PhD). University of Michigan.
- Zent, Stanford; Zent, Egleé L. (2007). "Los Jodï". In Freire, Germán; Tillett, Aimé (eds.). El estado de la salud indígena en Venezuela (in Spanish). Caracas: Ministerio del Poder Popular para la Salud de la República Bolivariana de Venezuela. pp. 77–130.
