= Piapoco language =

Endangered Arawakan language of South America

Piapoco
- Dzáse
- Native to: Colombia, Venezuela
- Ethnicity: Wenaiwika people
- Native speakers: (6,400 cited 2001–2007)
- Language family: Arawakan: Northern; Upper Amazon; Western Nawiki; Piapoko languages; Piapoco

Language codes
- ISO 639-3: pio
- Glottolog: piap1246 Piapoco
- ELP: Piapoco
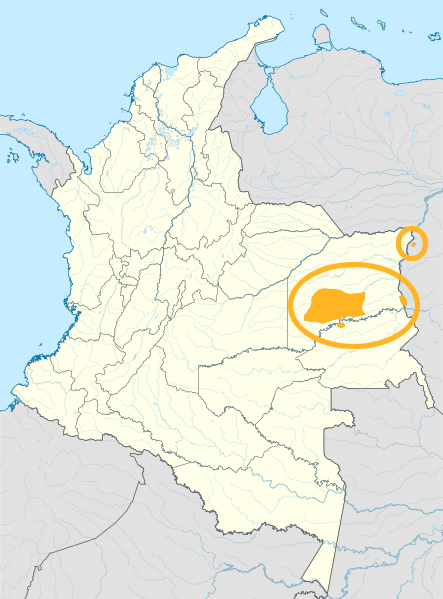

Piapoco is an Arawakan language of Colombia and Venezuela.

== History ==
Piapoco is a branch of the Arawak language family, which also includes Achagua. Piapoco is classified as a Northern Arawak language. There are only about 3,000 Piapoco speakers left today. These people live in the Meta, Vichada, and Guaviare rivers in Colombia Piapoco speakers also reside in Venezuela. It is an endangered language.

=== Geography/Background ===
The Piapocos come from the larger tribe, the Piaroa, who are indigenous to the Amazon rain forest. The Piapoco people originally lived in the midsection of Rio Guaviare, later moving in the 18th century to avoid settlers, missionaries, and others.

== Bilingualism ==
The word Piapoco is a Spanish nickname in reference to the toucan. Most Piapoco speakers also speak Spanish. Speakers who have had less contact with Spanish speakers more often pronounce the phoneme "s" as a voiceless interdental fricative. Younger speakers of the Piapoco language tend to eliminate the "h" more than older speakers due to their contact with the Spanish language.

When a large portion of people come in contact with another language and are competent in it, their language gradually becomes more like the other. This allows for a gradual convergence, where grammar and semantics of one language begin to replicate the other.

== Phonology ==
=== Consonants ===
		Labial	Dental	Alveolar	Palatal	Velar	Glottal
Nasal		m		n			
Stop	voiceless	p		t		k	
Stop	voiced	b		d			
Affricate				ts			
Fricative			s̪ ~ θ				h
Trill				r			
Approximant		w		l	j		

- /s̪/ can be pronounced as [θ] among speakers who have had less contact with Spanish speakers.
- /k/ can be palatalized as [kʲ] when after /i/, before another vowel.
- /ts/ can be pronounced as [tʃ] in free variation among different speakers.
- /w/ is pronounced as [β] when preceding front vowels.

=== Vowels ===
	Front	Back
High	i	u
Low	e	a

Vowels can be nasalized [ã] when occurring before nasal consonants.

== Grammar ==
A Piapoco-Spanish dictionary containing 2,500 words was written by Deloris Klumpp, in which botanical identification of plants were captured, although not all. The Piapoco language follows the following grammatical rules: plural suffix -nai used for animates only, derivational suffixes masculine -iri, feminine -tua, suffix -mi 'late, defunct,' nominalizing -si, declarative mood marker -ka. Piapoco is unique in that it seems to be a nominative-accusative language. There are eighteen segmental phonemes, fourteen consonant and four vowels in the Piapoco language.
