= Journal de la Société des Américanistes =

- Discipline: Anthropology, Linguistics,
- Language: English, French, Portuguese, Spanish

Publication details
- History: 1896-present
- Publisher: Société des Américanistes (France)
- Frequency: Biannually

Standard abbreviations
- ISO 4: J. Soc. Am.

Indexing
- ISSN: 0037-9174 (print); 1957-7842 (web)
- LCCN: 89648639
- OCLC no.: 716258361

Links
- Journal homepage; Online archive (1885-2000)

The Journal de la Société des Américanistes (Journal of the Society of Americanists) is an academic journal covering the cultural anthropology of the Americas.
