= Jirajara language =

Extinct language of western Venezuela

Jirajara
- Hirahara
- Native to: Venezuela
- Region: Falcón
- Extinct: early 20th century
- Language family: Jirajaran languages: Jirajara

Language codes
- ISO 639-3: None (mis)
- Glottolog: jira1249
- Linguasphere: 81-IAA-aa

Jirajara is an extinct language of western Venezuela. Other than being part of the Jirajaran family, its classification is uncertain due to a lack of data.
