= Ayamán language =

Extinct Jirajaran language of Venezuela

Ayomán
- Native to: Western Venezuela
- Region: Lara
- Ethnicity: Ayamán people
- Extinct: early 20th century
- Language family: Jirajaran: Ayomán

Language codes
- ISO 639-3: None (mis)
- Glottolog: ayom1234
- Linguasphere: 81-IAA-ba

Ayomán is an extinct Jirajaran language of western Venezuela, once spoken in the village of San Miguel de los Ayamanes by the Ayamán people in the state of Lara.
