= Samatali =

Samatali, Xamatari, Tsanuma, Chirichano, and Guaika are alternative names for:

- Sanuma people, an ethnic group of Venezuela and Brazil
- Sanuma language, a language of Venezuela and Brazil
