= Paraujano language =

Arawakan language spoken in Venezuela

Paraujano
- Añunnükü
- Native to: Venezuela
- Region: Lake Maracaibo, Zulia
- Ethnicity: 21,000 Paraujano (2011)
- Native speakers: 1 (2011)
- Revival: 2010s
- Language family: Arawakan: Northern; Ta-Arawakan; Paraujano

Language codes
- ISO 639-3: pbg
- Glottolog: para1316
- ELP: Paraujano
- Linguasphere: 82-ACA-b

- Añu is classified as Critically Endangered by the UNESCO Atlas of the World's Languages in Danger.

Paraujano is an Arawakan language spoken by one of the Paraujano, or Añu, people of Venezuela. The Paraujano live by Lake Maracaibo, Zulia State, in Northwest Venezuela.

== Status and speakers ==
Paraujano is critically endangered and nearly extinct. The Maracaibo region began transforming into a largely populated industrial center in the early 1900s, as petroleum was extracted from the Maracaibo Lake. As the Paraujano mingled with others early on, their language was spread and spoken by some newcomers. However, by the 1970s there were only thirteen speakers remaining. As of 2014, there is one surviving fluent speaker, a thirty-year-old by the name of Yofri Márquez, who learned the language from his grandmother. There are a few partial speakers, most of whom are elderly. Revitalization efforts include Paraujano instruction in six regional elementary schools and the establishment of various cultural organizations.

== Classification ==
Paraujano is a Northern Arawakan, or Maipuran, language. It is derived from Guajiro, yet is a distinct language and not a dialect of Guajiro. The two languages are closely related. According to lexicostatistical analysis conducted by Oliver (1989) the two languages must have diverged around AD 900.

== Phonology ==
The Paraujano phonemic inventory contains 14 pulmonic consonants and 11 vowels.

Paraujano consonants
	Bilabial	Alveolar	Palatal	Velar	Glottal
Nasal	m	n	ɲ		
Stop/Affricate	p	t	tʃ	k	
Fricative		s	ʃ		h
Semivowel			j	w	
Rhotic		ɾ			
Lateral		l			

Paraujano vowels
	Front	Central	Back
High	i iː	ɨ ɨː	u uː
Mid	e eː		o oː
Low		a aː	

The Paraujano phoneme inventory differs from closely related Guajiro, mainly in vowels and due to the incorporation of Spanish lexicon. There are a number of allophones in Paraujano. Among these allophones, there is a tendency toward palatization or nasalization.

== Lexicon ==
Paraujano has incorporated some Spanish words into its vocabulary. Out the eighty-nine available words from the Swadesh list, six are Spanish substitutes.

== See also ==
- Maracaibo Basin
- Wayuu people
