= Wenaiwika people =

Indigenous people of Colombia and Venezuela

Wenaiwika
Total population
- ~19,000

Regions with significant populations
- Colombia; Venezuela
- Colombia: 14,661 (2018)
- Venezuela: 3,714 (2011)

Languages
- Piapoco

Related ethnic groups
- Achagua, Curripaco

The Wenaiwika, Tsáse nái, Enaguas, or Piapoco are an Indigenous people of Colombia who inhabit various locations between the Meta River and the Guaviare River in the departments of Guainía, Meta, and Vichada, as well as the banks of the Orinoco River in the Venezuelan state of Amazonas. They number more than 18,000 individuals. Their Sikuani neighbors call them Deja. They are also known as Yapaco, Cuipoco, Cumanaica, and Wenéiwika.

== Origin ==
According to their traditional accounts, they originated from the Negro River basin, migrating through the Vaupés River before crossing the Guaviare River to reach their current territory. They belonged to a sib of the Hohódene phratry of the Curripaco, who occupied the Isana River basin. This was their place of origin, specifically the yuluatá stone in the Hípana rapids of the Aiarí River, a tributary of the Isana. They migrated from there using river and land routes through the Vaupés to the upper Guaviare, the Llanos, and the upper Orinoco.

== Economy ==
Their economy combines agriculture with fishing and hunting. They cultivate bitter cassava, corn, beans, yams, cocoyams, sweet potatoes, peach palm, pineapple, chili, cashew, plantain, rice, and sugarcane. The processing of bitter cassava is a prominent task for women, who extract starch to make "casabe" (flatbread) and "fariña" (toasted flour), using the squeezed juice to cook "mingao", a traditional beverage.

Women also practice pottery. They manufacture the púali or "budare," a large griddle used for roasting cassava starch. They also make clay pots and bowls for sale. On the day a budare is molded, the potters must avoid bathing or drinking water to ensure the object does not deform or crack. Both men and women produce hammocks from the fibers of the cumare palm; some are for personal use, while the finer, intricately crafted ones are sold. They also produce basketry, primarily the mapíri, used for storing "fariña".

Bows and arrows are used for both hunting and fishing, which become particularly important during the summer. They raise chickens, pigs, and cattle.

== Social organization ==
Originally, they formed a "phratry" made up of exogamous patrilineal clans. The main authority figures are the parents-in-law, around whom extended families and residential units are formed. Today, in addition to respecting exogamy within each lineage, each residential unit or locality is exogamous. While maintaining marital relations among themselves, they have also established marriage alliances with the Sikuani, Curripaco, Sáliba, and Achagua. This has led to a clan system perspective that often transcends ethnic boundaries. The communities live in indigenous reservations where collective ownership is recognized by the state, often sharing these lands with communities with whom they hold marriage alliances.

== Cosmology ==
Furna Minali or Kuwai made the world habitable by defeating Kemeine, a cannibalistic anaconda, whom he banished into space, transforming it into the Milky Way. Kâali duápeni brought humans out of the yuluatá stone and distributed the territory among them. Kuwai organized human society and gave each people their language. Both older men and women can be recognized as shamans after undergoing rigorous study and several trials, including periods of fasting. A highly important ritual is female initiation, also known as the "fish prayer".
