= Urequena language =

Extinct language of South America

Urequena
- Arequena, Uerequena, Urekena
- Native to: Putumayo River (in Colombia, Peru, or Brazil)
- Era: attested 1831
- Language family: Andoque–Urequena: Urequena

Language codes
- ISO 639-3: –
- Glottolog: urek1234

The extinct Urequena language (also Urekena or Arequena) is a language variety that is closely related to Andoque. It is known only from an unpublished word list by Austrian naturalist Johann Natterer that was probably recorded in June or July 1831.

== Vocabulary ==
The table below adapted from Jolkesky (2016) shows similarities between Urequena and Andoque. The Urequena (Uerequena, Arequena, Orelhudos) data is from an undated 19th-century manuscript by Austrian naturalist Johann Natterer. Natterer gives the Içá River (or Putumayo River) as the location of the language.

English gloss (translated)	Portuguese gloss (Jolkesky 2016)	Urequena (transcription)	Urequena (IPA)	Andoque
1.S (I)	1.S	no-, nö-	no-, nə-	no-, o-
3.S.INDEF	3.S.INDEF	ni-, in-	ni-, in-	ni-, i-
1.P (we)	1.P	kau-	kau-	ka(a)-
water	água	da u koü	daukʷɯ	dʌʉhʉ
bow	arco	bàarù	baaru	pãhã-se
banana	banana	kòka-rè	kɔka-ræ	kɒkɒ-pɤ
arm	braço	-nùka	-nũka	-nõka
head	cabeça	-nari	-nari	-tai:
canoe	canoa	pau kö	paukə	pukə̃
rain	chuva	da oié	dawiæ	dɤʔi
finger	dedo	-ni-rui	-ni-rui	-si-domĩ
tooth	dente	-konì	-konĩ	-kónĩ
stomach	estômago	-tuu	-tuː	-tura
star	estrela	vuai kùi	βuaikui	fʉəkhʉ
tongue	língua	-tschoru	-ʧoru	-sonə̃
axe	machado	föü	ɸəɯ	pʌʌ
maize	milho	schuu	ʃuu	soboi
nose	nariz	-vüta	-βɯta	-pɤta
eye	olho	-jakoü	-jakoɯ	-ákʌ
calf, lower leg	pantorrilha	-va	-βa	-pã ‘perna’ ("leg")
leg	perna	-va-tana	-βa-tana	-pã ‘perna’ ("leg"); -tanə̃ ‘osso’ ("bone")
net	rede	kooma͠n	koːmã	komə̃
nail	unha	govü-tarü	ɡoβɯ-tarɯ	-si-kopɤ

== See also ==
- Duho languages
