= Piaroa language =

Indigenous language of Venezuela and Colombia

Piaroa
- De'aruwa
- Native to: Colombia and Venezuela
- Ethnicity: Piaroa people
- Native speakers: 14,500 (2017)
- Language family: Piaroa–Saliban: Piaroan; Piaroa
- Writing system: Latin

Language codes
- ISO 639-3: pid
- Glottolog: piar1243
- ELP: Piaroa
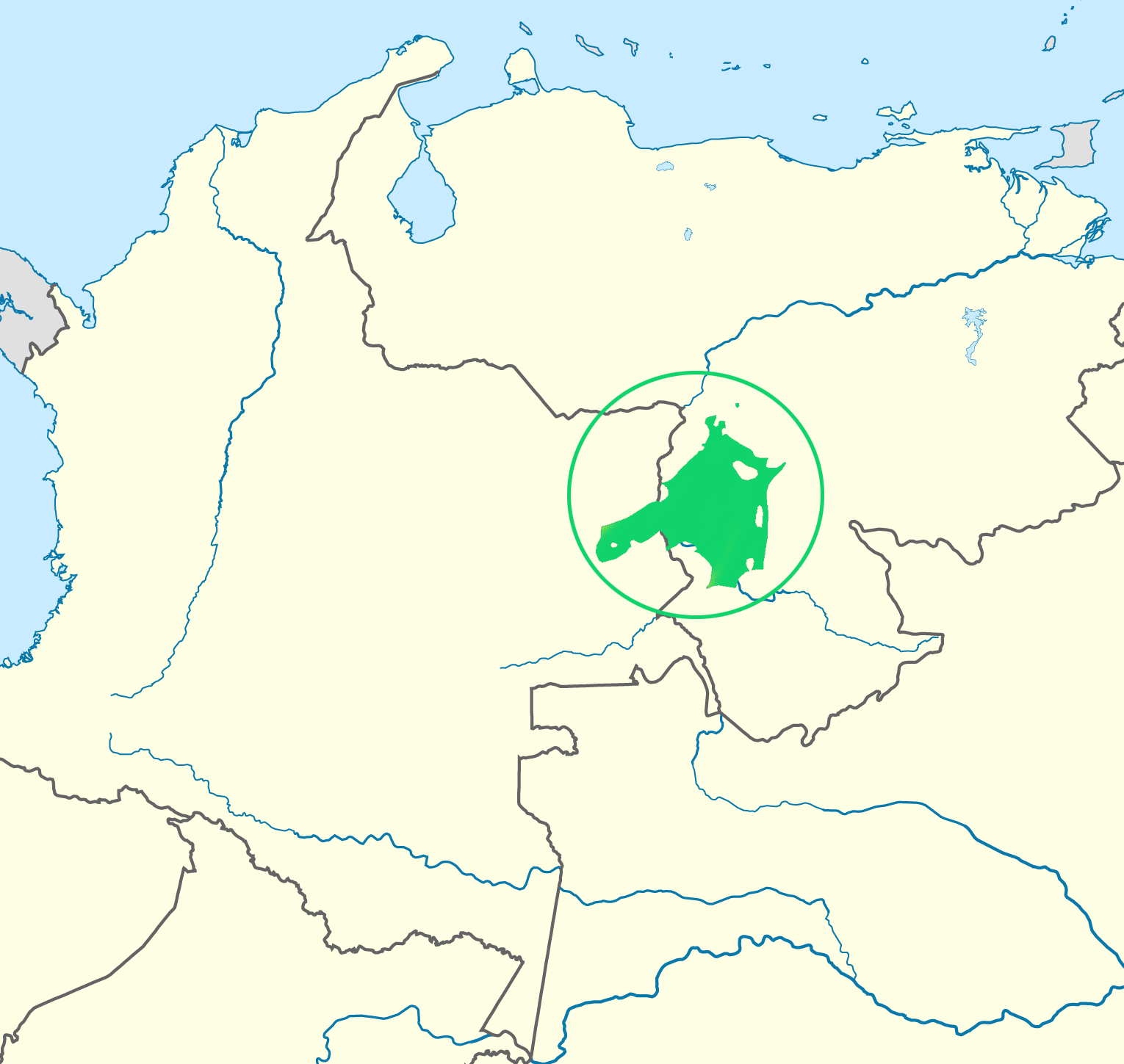

Piaroa is an Indigenous language of Venezuela and Colombia, spoken by the Piaroa people. It is a member of the Piaroa–Saliban languages, and was spoken by 14,500 people in 2017.

== Classification ==
Piaroa is related to the Wirö language (commonly called by the pejorative term "Maco"), to which it is closely related, the two forming a Piaroan branch, and Saliba, composing a language family called Piaroa–Saliban. Piaroa–Saliban has been linked to various language families in the region, include Hoti, Betoi–Jirara, and Ticuna–Yuri. Wirö is so close to Piaroa that some authors have incorrectly classified it as a dialect of Piaroa. A fourth Piaroa–Saliban language has been claimed, Ature, but no data was ever collected for it and it is now extinct. The relationship between Piaroa and Saliba was first recognized by Filippo Salvatore Gilii in 1782.

== Status ==
Piaroa was spoken by about 14,500 people in 2017. The language is spoken vigorously by all generations of Piaroa people.

== Alternate names ==
Piaroa is called by many names, including variations of Wotuja, Wo’tiheh, and Huottüja.

== Phonology ==
Consonants
		Bilabial	Dental	Alveolar	Palatal	Velar		Glottal	
		Bilabial	Dental	Alveolar	Palatal	plain	lab.	plain	lab.
Stop	Plain	p	t			k	kʷ	ʔ	
Stop	Aspirated	pʰ~ɸ	tʰ			kʰ	kʰʷ		
Stop	Ejective	pʼ	tʼ			kʼ	kʷʼ		
Stop	Glottal	ˀb	ˀd						
Affricate	Plain				t͡ʃ~t͡s				
Affricate	Aspirated			t͡sʰ					
Affricate	Ejective			t͡sʼ					
Fricative				s				hˣ	hˣʷ
Nasal		m		n					
Flap/Lateral				ɾ	ʎ				
Approximant					j~dʲ		w		

Palatalization of /k, kʰ, kʼ, hˣ/ may occur when before front vowels as [kʲ, kʲʰ, kʲʼ, hʲ].

/pʰ/ is in free variation with [ɸ].

Phonemes /j/ and /t͡ʃ/ may have allophones of [dʲ, t͡s].

Vowels
	Front	Central	Back
Close	i	ɨ	u ɯ
Mid	e		ɤ~o
Open	æ		ɑ~ɒ

Vowels /ɤ, ɑ/ are rounded as [o, ɒ] when after labial consonants.

Nasalization is analyzed as a suprasegmental feature.

== Morphology ==
Two genders are distinguished in Piaroa, masculine and feminine.

== Syntax ==
=== Word order ===
Preferred word order in Piaroa is subject–object–verb word order.
