= Aricagua Municipality =

Aricagua Municipality Municipio Aricagua
- Municipality
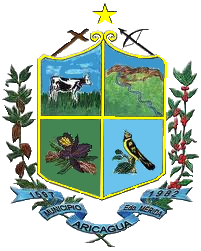
- Flag Coat of arms

- Location in Mérida

- Location in Venezuela
- Coordinates: 8°13′33″N 71°08′40″W
- Country: Venezuela
- State: Mérida

Government
  - Mayor: Oneide Castillo

Area
  - Total: 790 km^{2} (310 sq mi)

Population (2007)
  - Total: 4,564
  - Density: 5.8/km^{2} (15/sq mi)
- Time zone: UTC−4 (VET)
- Area code(s): 0274
- Website: Official website

The Aricagua Municipality is one of the 23 municipalities (municipios) that make up the Venezuelan state of Mérida and, according to a 2007 population estimate by the National Institute of Statistics of Venezuela, the municipality had a population of 4,564. The town of Aricagua is the shire town of the Aricagua Municipality.

== Demographics ==
The Aricagua Municipality, according to a 2007 population estimate by the National Institute of Statistics of Venezuela, had a population of 4,564 (up from 4,514 in 2000). This amounted to 0.5% of the state's population. The municipality's population density is 5.8 inhabitants per square kilometre (15/sq mi).

== Government ==
The mayor of the Aricagua Municipality is Nelson Jesus Márquez Rojas, re-elected on October 31, 2004, with 59% of the vote. The municipality is divided into two parishes; Capital Aricagua and San Antonio.
