= Piaroa–Saliban languages =

Orinoco Basin language family

Piaroa–Saliban
- Saliban
- Geographic distribution: Colombia and Venezuela
- Linguistic classification: Duho ?: Piaroa–Saliban
- Subdivisions: Saliban; Piaroa–Maco

Language codes
- Glottolog: sali1297

The Piaroa–Saliban, also known as Saliban (Spanish: Sálivan), are a small language family of the middle Orinoco Basin, which forms an independent island within an area of Venezuela and Colombia (northern llanos) dominated by peoples of Carib and Arawakan affiliation.

== Languages ==
Piaroa and Wirö (or "Maco") form a Piaroan branch of the family.

The extinct Ature language, once spoken on the Orinoco River near the waterfalls of Atures, Venezuela, is unattested but was said to be 'little different' from Saliba, and so may have formed a Saliban branch of the family.

== Language contact ==
Jolkesky (2016) notes that there are lexical similarities with the Andoke–Urekena, Arawak, Máku, Tukano, and Yaruro language families due to contact.

Lozano (2014:212) has also noted similarities between the Saliba-Hodi and Arawakan languages.

== External relations ==
Zamponi (2017) notes resemblances between the extinct Betoi language and Piaroa–Saliban. He considers a genealogical relationship plausible, though data on Betoi is scarce.

There are lexical similarities with the Hotï language (Jodï), and this has been interpreted as evidence for a Jodï–Saliban language family. However, the similarities have also been explained as contact.

Jolkesky (2009) includes Piaroa-Saliba, Betoi and Hodi in a Duho family along with Ticuna–Yuri.

== Vocabulary ==
Rosés Labrada (2019) lists the following Swadesh-list items that are reconstructable to Proto-Sáliban.

no.	gloss	Sáliba	Piaroa	Wirö
13	bite (v)	ɲĩpe	j̃ɨ	ʤ̃ɨbɨ
15	blood	kʷau	ʧukʷɤha	ʧukʷi iʦobu
22	cold	dia	dijɑwɑʔɑ	tiʤua
31	drink (v)	õgʷe	ɑwu	owɨ
36	soil	sẽxẽ	ɾẽhẽ	nihi
37	eat (v)	ikʷe	ku	kuanɨ
38	egg	hiea	ijæ	iʤapo
39	eye	pahute	ʧiʔæhæɾe	ʧɨbahale
41	far	oto	ɤtɤ	ɨdɨ
42	fat/oil	õdete	ɑ̃dẽ	õte
49	fish	pahĩdi	pɤĩ	bãĩ
53	flower	sebapu	æʔu	ĩʦãbũ
66	hand	umo	ʧũmu	ʧɨmamu
70	heart	omaidi	ʧɑ̃mi isɤkˀi	ʧomahade
71	heavy	umaga	ɑmækɑʔɑ	ɨmɨka
96	meat	dea	ʧidepæ	itebia
99	mouth	aha	ʧæ	ʧaa
106	nose	ĩxu	ʧ̃ɨhĩjũ	ʧĩʤũ
116	red/yellow	dua	tũɑ̃ʔɑ̃	duwɨ
119	river	oxe	ɑhe	ohʷe
120	path	maana	mænæ	mana/mãlã
138	sky	mũma sẽxẽ	moɾɤ̃hæ̃	m̃ɨlẽhẽ
139	sleep (v)	ae	æʔɨ	abɨ
144	snake	ɟakʷi	ækɑ	akoˀda
152	star	sipodi	siɾikˀɤ	ʦiɾiʔi
158	swell (v)	hipame	hiæmɑʔɑ	hebamɨ
172	tongue	anane	ʧine	ʧinene
176	two (anim)	tuxũdu	tɑ̃hũ	dũhũtaha
179	hot	duda	duɑʔɑ	tuba
184	what?	ãdaha	dæhe	tahi
187	white	dea	teɑʔɑ	dewɨ
188	who?	ãdiha	di	ti
195	woman	ɲaxu	isahu	iʦuhu

== See also ==
- Duho languages

== Bibliography ==
- Benaissa, T. (1991). Vocabulario Sáliba-Español Español Sáliba. Lomalinda: Alberto Lleras Camargo.
- Feddema, H. (1991). Diccionario Piaroa - Español. (Manuscript).
- Krute, L. D. (1989). Piaroa nominal morphosemantics. New York: Columbia University. (Doctoral dissertation).
- Kaufman, Terrence. (1990). Language history in South America: What we know and how to know more. In D. L. Payne (Ed.), Amazonian linguistics: Studies in lowland South American languages (pp. 13–67). Austin: University of Texas Press. ISBN 0-292-70414-3.
- Kaufman, Terrence. (1994). The native languages of South America. In C. Mosley & R. E. Asher (Eds.), Atlas of the world's languages (pp. 46–76). London: Routledge.
