= Gayon language =

Extinct language of western Venezuela

Gayón
- Native to: Western Venezuela
- Region: Lara
- Extinct: early 20th century
- Language family: Jirajaran: Gayón

Language codes
- ISO 639-3: None (mis)
- Glottolog: gayo1245
- Linguasphere: 81-IAA-ca

Gayón is an extinct language of western Venezuela, spoken at the sources of the Tocuyo River in the state of Lara. Other than being part of the Jirajaran family, its classification is uncertain due to a lack of data. Coyón is sometimes given as an alternative name (LinguistList), or is an undocumented neighboring language.
