= Piaroa people =

Indigenous people of Venezuela and Colombia

Piaroa
Huottüja
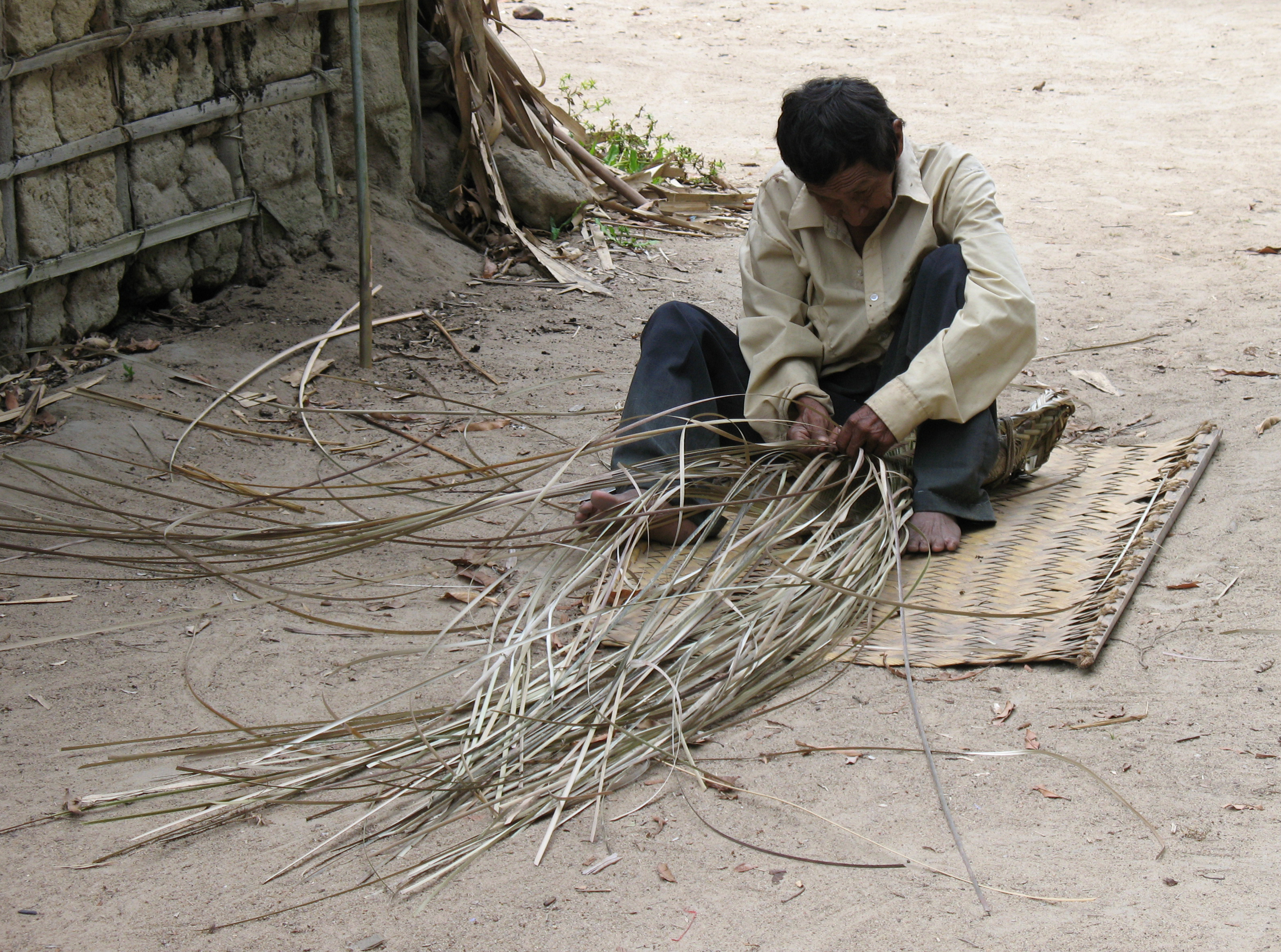
- Huottüja man making a sebucan.

Regions with significant populations
- Venezuela, Colombia
- Venezuela: 19,293 (2011)
- Colombia: 1,127 (2019)

Languages
- Piaroa, Maquiritare, Yabarana, and Spanish

Religion
- Indigenous, Shamanism, Christianity

Related ethnic groups
- Maku

The Piaroa people, known among themselves as the Huottüja or De'aruhua, are an Indigenous people of South America, who primarily live in the middle Orinoco Basin in present-day Colombia and Venezuela. Their territory is larger than Belgium and is roughly circumscribed by the Suapure, Parguaza (north), the Ventuari (southeast), the Manapiare (northeast) and the right bank of the Orinoco (west). Their population is about 15,000, with an estimated 2,500 living on the left bank of the Orinoco River, in Colombia, in several reservations between the Vichada (north) and the Guaviare (south).

Since the Piaroa (Huottüja or De'aruhua) first encountered missionaries and European explorers around 1780, they have maintained an autonomous society with many small, self-governed villages built over a very wide area. Ethnologists and linguists from the 18th century misidentified the Huottuja as three different tribes belonging to the Saliban family, the Ature, Piaroa, and Quàqua, in actuality were three different regional dialects of the same Piaroa ethnic group from the north, center and south.

In recent years, populations living within the traditional territory began to reclaim their cultural heritage and sovereignty by designating official leaders, establishing an admiralty court (tribunal), creating laws that protect their environment, and mapping their villages, rivers, creeks, trails, cemeteries, mountains, valleys, monuments, protected areas, community centers, and conucos (familiar garden patches) in their own language and in Spanish. Under pressure of unlawful incursions into their territory during 2016 through 2019 in the North, South, and West by ex-FARC and ELN guerrilla groups from Colombia engaged in illicit activities such as mining and deforestation and due to the failure of the national government under the Venezuelan Constitution, Chapter VIII: Rights of Native People to protect their people or defend their territory, the Piaroa established a Special Indigenous Legal Jurisdiction which includes all of their people that live in the original territory and the traditional sovereign territory. In 2020, Piaroa living on the Catañiapo River successfully and peacefully removed more than 200 armed Colombian non-state actors and called an assembly of Indigenous jurisdictional officials.

== Name ==
Piaroa is a term of unknown origin (probably Latin) which became the name of the language and thus the common name (exonym) for the Huottüja De'aruhua people. The ethnic group officially refers to themselves the "Huottüja" (English spelling) some, mostly men are also known as De'aruwa or De'aruhua (masters of the forest). In their language the Uwottüja, Huottöja, or Wothuha means "knowledgeable people of the forest", usually spelled Huǫttųją (NTM spelling) and Wötʰïhä (IPA spelling), or De'atʰïhä (guardians of the forest). Their name is also spelled u̧wo̧tju̧ja̧.

== Territory ==
Current location of Piaroa language speakers.

Taking advantage of the special laws for the Indigenous people of Venezuela introduced in 2004, the Colombian Constitution of 1991 and the United Nations Declaration on the Rights of Indigenous Peoples in 2007, the Piaroa declared their autonomy and sovereign status by creating a special legal jurisdiction and a court under their rights to self-determination as Indigenous peoples in 2020. The Piaroa originally occupied an area of approximately 33,000 square kilometers, an area that has been acknowledged by the Venezuelan governments since the 1990s. Under pressure by armed non-state actors, illegal gold mining, and other unlawful occupation of their territory, with the lack of protection from the government or military, prompted several organizations formed by the Piaroa and other Indigenous rights advocates to take steps to form a multi-faceted autonomous governmental body around their special legal jurisdiction to defend their homes, families, and ecologies from invasion or abuse.

== Society ==
Seeing competition as spiritually evil and lauding cooperation, the Piaroa are both strongly egalitarian and supportive of individual autonomy, each community is independently led and often cooperate therebetween. The Piaroa are also strongly anti-authoritarian and opposed to the hoarding of resources, which they see as giving members the power to constrain their freedom. The Huottüja emulate humility, pacifism, and positive moral values; the Piaroa are monogamous and rarely separate or divorce.

Despite sometimes being described as one of the world's most peaceful societies, modern anthropologists report that the relations of Piaroa with neighbouring tribes are actually "unfriendly, marked by physical or magical warfare". Violent conflict erupted between the Piaroa and the Wæñæpi of the Upper Suapure and Guaviarito regions, with both tribes fighting to control the clay pits of the Guanay valley. Clay from that valley is a valuable commodity, being the best clay for making pottery in the region. Constant warfare also exists between the Huottüja and Caribs, who invaded Piaroa territory from the east in search of captives.

Anthropologist Joanna Overing also notes that social hierarchy is minimal, and that it would be difficult to say any true form of male dominance exists, despite leaders being traditionally male. As a result of the individualism in leadership from community to community, a lack of a central form of governance and equality between the sexes, the Piaroa have been described by some anthropologists as a functioning anarchist society.

== Religion ==
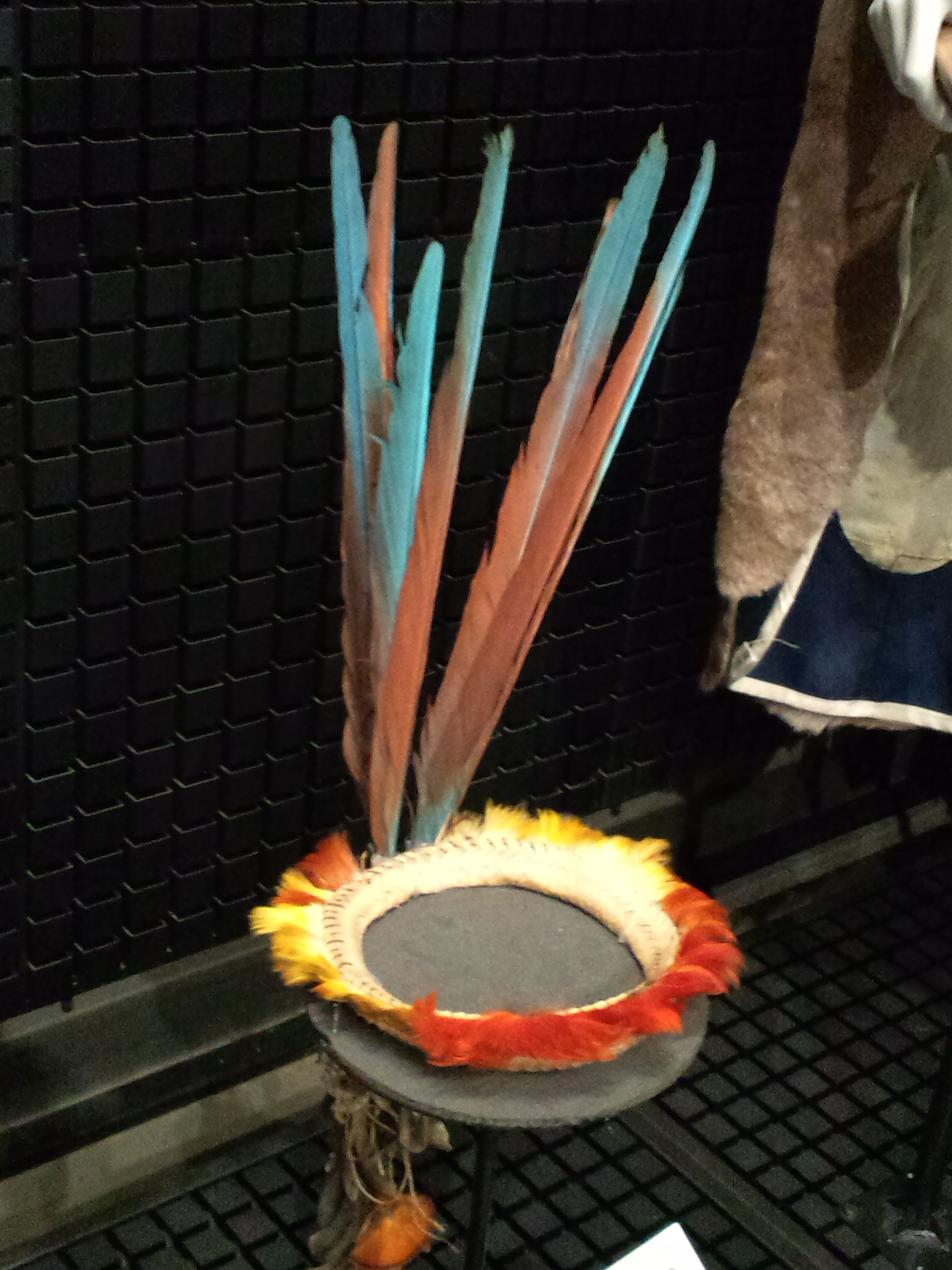
Macaw feather headdress of a Piaroa chief.

The traditional Piaroa religion involves shamanism and is centered around a creator god named Wahari who was said to have incarnated as a tapir. The Huottüja were influenced by religion as early as the late 1700s with the mission in San Fernando de Atabapo, in the 1940s by the Salesians and Jesuits, then by missionaries from the Protestant Evangelical faiths including Baptist and Presbyterian. In 2006, the national Venezuelan government took a negative view of the influence of the New Tribes Missions especially those that were deep in the forests, expelling most foreign Christian missionaries. Over the years about 50% of the Piaroa (once estimated at 80%) have converted to Christianity and the influence of the shamans over local communities have waned leaving the village captain or chief in charge of daily movement, as new generations of Piaroa become more educated, modernized and organized.

The most self-isolated and independent villages living at the heart of the traditional territory on the Upper Cuao, Upper Catañiapo and Upper Parguaza rivers have managed to preserve the culture, customs, heritage and their spirituality with the earth. A resurgence of public interest in Piaroa shamanism and entheogenic plant use is providing positive reinforcement for ayahuasca (yagé) and yopo tourism among the De'aruhua communities. Many Piaroa today acknowledge that the influence of the church, monarchy, politics, and violations of their human rights by the state which began in the middle of the eighteenth century have all distorted their Indigenous cosmovision as a people. Piaroa continue to identify themselves as Huottuja first, secondly as Venezuelans or Colombians and third as Christians or non-Christian with great indifference relative to anything except being Piaroa. The Indigenous Piaroa do not trust the government in general, those who believe in Christianity or intermarry with other ethnos tend not to associate with the more traditional Piaroa that use shamans; however, even Christian Piaroa support ideas, initiatives, projects, and programs in solidarity with their people in promoting their original culture, identity and language, including shamanism and mythology.

== Economy ==
The Piaroa engage in many forms of subsistence farming; those living in rural communities also fish, gather fruit, and hunt for small game. Hunting and gathering is generally not exploited commercially, however fishing and the collection of some fruits are used to supplement or generate income. Since the 1980s the Piaroa have become involved in growing anon, cassava, cocoa, cupuacu, manaca, moriche and other native plants as commercial agroforestry crops. Some also raise cattle, make baskets, string beads, and collect vines (for rattan furniture). Salaried and hourly wage work is also a common among the Piaroa who work in every sector of the economy.

Cocoa harvested by the Piaroa since 2008 has become world-famous based on the efforts of artisan craft chocolate makers in Canada, Germany, France, the United States and Venezuela after being found by cocoa hunters like Castronovo. Nearly 25% of all the traditional Piaroa villages deep in the forests are engaged in growing organic wild grown cocoa today. It is unknown if the wild endemic heirloom variety of cocoa that was first observed by Alexander von Humboldt in 1800 still exists today. The Piaroa from village to village plant all three different cultivars Criollo, Forastero, and Trinitario which are transplanted to the wild to grow under the forest canopy or as a canuco replacement crop to fill the void in the forest that results from cultivating manioc (cassava).

From the 1990 until 2010 ecotourism became a major economic factor among the Piaroa which included students, academic institutions, diplomatic officials, missionaries, non-governmental organizations, researchers and a few perpetual travellers which touched their communities. The Piaroa recognized the potential of tourism in 2004 with the introduction of new laws for Indigenous peoples and tourism; but lament in the current state of government affairs in Venezuela as one that does not facilitate their economy, people or tourism which was down 98% in 2015 from 10 years previously.

== Language ==
The Piaroa speak Wötʰïhä tivene, or Piaroa language, which belongs to the Saliban language family. Because the Piaroa language was mostly unwritten until the 1930s and phonetically incompatible with Spanish or English sounds, their official alphabet was based on biblical translations developed by the Summer Institute of Linguistics (SIL) in the 1950s, the Huottüja themselves have since developed their own alphabet based on the accepted Latin Language codes ISO 639-3 PID guidelines of the institute, an elementary dictionary and a number of grade school curriculum readers.
