= Panare people =

Indigenous people who live in the Amazonas basin

Panare / E'ñepá
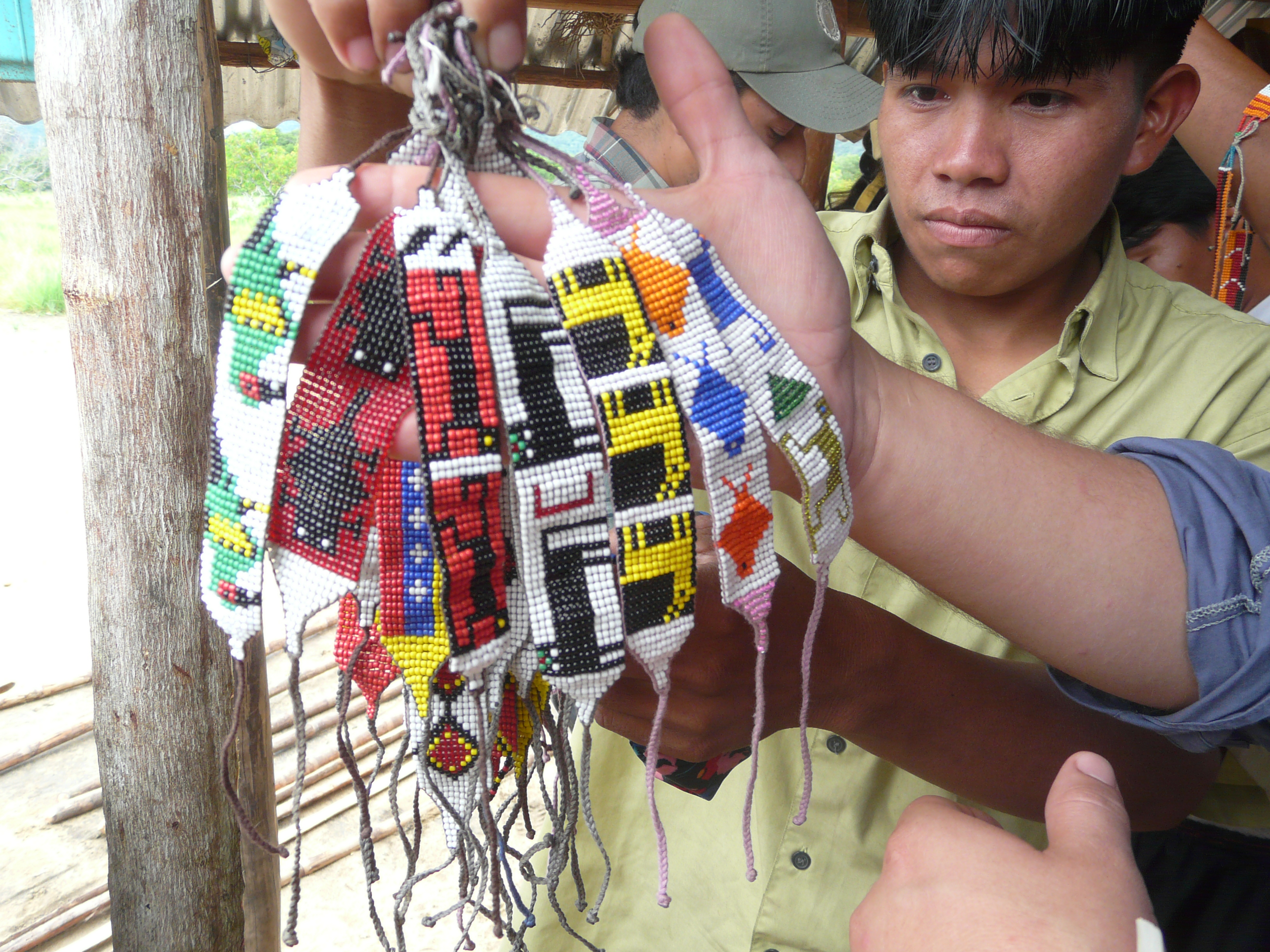
- E'ñepá man selling handicraft, 2008

Total population
- 4.688 (2011)

Languages
- Panare language

Related ethnic groups
- Pemon • Ye'kuana

The Panare, who call themselves E'ñepá, are an indigenous group of people living in the Amazonian region of Venezuela. Their heartland is located in the Guayana Highlands. They speak the Panare language, which belongs to the Carib family.

The Panare people are traditionally hunters and swidden agricultualists, though many have turned to fishing and livestock raising to augment their food supply. Handicrafts have become significant sources of income for a number of Panare communities, and wage labour is increasing among them. Material culture among the Panare is currently changing rapidly, as with other Indigenous peoples in the region. They reside in semi-permanent settlements, which host 20 to 80 people. The settlements are composed of one to four longhouses, which last up to five years before the thatch, made out of palm leaves, breaks down, after which new houses are constructed, typically in a new location. Food is shared within settlement groups, but a number of hearth groups, composed of one man, his wife or wives, and their children, have their own cooking fires. Cooking is done over open fires, and the majority of food is cooked via boiling. Men exclusively conduct fishing and hunting activities, and women typically do most of the child-raising and the majority of cooking, although men "interact significantly" with children. Both men and women, however, manage the gardens.

The first ever episode of the long-running ITV anthropological television series Disappearing World, in 1970 focused on these people.

== See also ==
- Panare language
