= Panare language =

Cariban language

Panare
- Eʼñapa Woromaipu
- Native to: Venezuela
- Region: just south of the Orinoco River, Estado Bolívar
- Ethnicity: 4,300 Panare people (2001 census)
- Native speakers: (3,500 cited 2001 census); 2,480 monolinguals (mostly women)
- Language family: Cariban: Venezuelan Carib; Pemóng–Panare; Panare

Language codes
- ISO 639-3: pbh
- Glottolog: enap1235
- ELP: Panare
- Linguasphere: 80-ADA-aa

- Panare is classified as Vulnerable by the UNESCO Atlas of the World's Languages in Danger

Panare is a Cariban language, spoken by the Panare, who number 3,000–4,000 and live in Bolivar State in central Venezuela. Their main area is South of the town of Caicara del Orinoco, south of the Orinoco River. There are several subdialects of the language. The autonym for the people is e'ñapá, which has various senses depending on context, including 'people', 'indigenous-people', and 'Panare-people'. The term for the language is Eʼñapa Woromaipu. The term "Panare" itself is a Tupí word that means "friend." It is unusual in having object–verb–agent as one of its main word orders, the other being the more common verb–agent–object. It also displays the typologically uncommon property of an ergative–absolutive alignment in the non-perfective aspects and a nominative–accusative alignment in perfective aspect.

== Classification ==
Panare is a member of the Cariban language family, though its sub-grouping within the family is a matter of contention. The first decades of attempted classifications were largely rejected by linguists; a uniform classification of all proposed members of the Cariban family was introduced by Terrence Kaufman (1994). This grouping, still widely used by linguists, classifies Panare as a member of the Southern Amazonian branch, with no cousin languages.

However, Spike Gildea has criticized this grouping as relying on faulty data used for earlier classifications by Durbin and Loukotka that have been since rejected for this reason. In 2012, Gildea put forth his own classification, which groups Panare as a member of the Venezuelan Carib branch, and in turn, part of the low-level Pemóng-Panare branch. This classification has been considered an improvement by linguists such as Lyle Campbell and Doris & Thomas Payne, but it has yet to replace the Kaufman grouping, largely due to its relative youth.

== Distribution ==
The speakers of Panare (called E'ñepa (lit. "people") in their own language) live in Bolívar, Venezuela, west of the Cuchivero basin of the Orinoco River. Up until the 21st century, the Panare had few contacts with non-indigenous peoples (the few being explorers and anthropologists). However, increasing interactions with Venezuelans has led to widespread bilingualism with Spanish.

== Phonology ==
Panare contains approximately 14 contrasting consonant phonemes, with variation depending on dialect and origins of certain lexical items (see: Notes).

Consonants
	Labial	Alveolar	Alveo- palatal	Velar	Glottal
Nasal	m	n	ɲ	(ŋ)	
Plosive	p	t	t͡ɕ	k	ʔ
Fricative		s			h
Glide	w		j		
Flap		ɾ			

Panare contains 7 contrasting vowel phonemes.

Vowels
	Front	Central	Back
High	i	ɨ	u
Mid	e	ə	o
Low		a	

Notes

/n/ = [ŋ]/_#, _C[-alveolar]/[n] elsewhere; /ɲ/ has phonemic status in loanwords from Spanish, and is an allophone in native words; Payne & Payne (2013) consider /ʔ/ and /h/ to be different allophones of an “underlying pharyngeal approximate,” that releases differently depending on environment. There are also records of these two phones occurring in free variation, which may be attributed to once-distinct dialects being merged into communities of speakers with idiolectical contrasts.

== Morphology ==
Panare is best classified as a heavy-agglutinating language that verges on polysynthesis. Many of its morphemes can be clearly identified by roots that remain isolated across inflectional processes, and inflection by multiple affixes is usually light. Words can grow long and complicated, but they can usually be rooted in one firm idea, rather than something akin to a process-based sentence.

However, elements of polysynthesis appear in how roots are initially inflected. Essentially, most roots (that are not complements) are bound morphemes in some way, and require at least one inflectional morpheme until they can be used as units in a sentence. For example:

- '-uwaatï' roughly correlates to 'burn,' but is a bound morpheme
- 'yuwaatï' means, 'it's going to burn.' 'Yuwaatïjtepe' means, 'it wants to burn.' They are both complete words.

== Syntax ==
Panare sentence structure does not follow a strict word order, but a flexible one. In most studies, it is classified as an object-initial language. However, subject-object-verb and subject-verb-object are known to appear frequently as well. This kind of "object-initial tendency" is quite common in Amazonia, where sentence structure is often more consistently arranged through clause construction type than word order. As a result, Panare and its neighboring languages often use case markings as a way of ordering how constituents of a sentence affect each other.

Future, desiderative, and nonspecific aspect clauses in Panare instantiate the cross-linguistically rare nominative–absolutive alignment. An example is given below.

Yutësejpa (këj) kën.
/j-u-tə-sehpa (kəh) kən/
s-V s.AUX S
3-S_{A}-go-FUT 3.ANIM.COP 3.ANIM.DIST
‘S/he will go.’

Yamasejpa (këj) kën.
/j-ama-sehpa (kəh) kən/
p-V a.AUX A
3-S_{A}-throw.away-FUT 3.ANIM.COP 3.ANIM.DIST
‘S/he will throw away it/him/her.’

In Panare nominative–absolutive clauses, the nominative and absolutive are distinguished as follows. The unmarked nominative (pro)noun (if it occurs explicitly) always follows the predicate (kën in the example above), with nominative agreement in the auxiliary if there is one (këj in the example above). In contrast, the absolutive arguments are indexed by means of verbal prefixes (y- in the example above) or by absolutive nouns phrases (not shown above), which are in a complimentary distribution with the absolutive person prefixes.

== Bibliography ==
- Campbell, Lyle. 1997. American Indian Languages: the Historical Linguistics of Native America. New York: Oxford University Press.
- Campbell, Lyle. 2012. “Typological characteristics of South American indigenous languages.” In: Lyle Campbell, Verónica Grondona (eds.), The Indigenous Languages of South America: A Comprehensive Guide, 259-330: Berlin: Walter de Gruyter
- Crevels, Mily. 2012. "Language endangerment in South America: The clock is ticking." In: Lyle Campbell, Verónica Grondona (eds.), The Indigenous Languages of South America: A Comprehensive Guide, 167-234: Berlin: Walter de Gruyter
- Gildea, Spike. 1989. Simple and relative clauses in Panare, University of Oregon Master's Thesis
- Gildea, Spike. 2012. “Linguistic studies in the Cariban family.” In: Lyle Campbell, Verónica Grondona (eds.), The Indigenous Languages of South America: A Comprehensive Guide, 441-494: Berlin: Walter de Gruyter.
- Payne, Thomas E., & Doris L. Payne. 2013. A Typological Grammar of Panare: A Cariban Language of Venezuela. Koninklijke Brill NV, Leiden, The Netherlands.
