= Hodï language =

Unclassified language spoken in Venezuela

Hodï
- Yuwana, Waruwadu
- Jojodö tjįwęnę
- Pronunciation: [hotɨ]
- Native to: central Venezuela
- Ethnicity: Hodï
- Native speakers: 640 (2007)
- Language family: unclassified

Language codes
- ISO 639-3: yau
- Glottolog: yuwa1244
- ELP: Jotí

The Hodï (Jodï, Jotí, Hoti) language, also known as Yuwana (Yoana), Waruwaru (Waruwadu), or Chikano (Chicano), is a small unclassified language spoken by the Hodï people of Venezuela. Very little is known of it; its several hundred speakers are monolingual hunter-gatherers. The people call themselves Jojodö ('the people') or Wįlǫ̈, and their language Jojodö tjįwęnę. The two communities with the most speakers are San José de Kayamá and Caño Iguana, with several hundred speakers total.

Sources are inconsistent with nasals, varying between e.g. nV and lṼ.

== Classification ==
No classification of Hodï has yet been established to the satisfaction of linguists.

Attempts have been made to link Hodï with the nearby Piaroa–Saliban languages. A recent proposal classifies Hodï and (Piaroa–)Saliban as the branches of a single Jodï–Saliban macrofamily. However, similarities in vocabulary with the Piaroa–Saliban languages may in fact be due to sprachbunding: Henley, Mattéi-Müller and Reid (1996) argue that the apparent cognates between Hodï and Piaroa–Saliban are rather loanwords.

Henley et al., based on limited data, said that Hodï may be related to the Nadahup languages. The only linguist to speak Hodï and Piaroa, Stanford Zent, has collected more reliable data and said that it is "probably" related to the Piaroa–Saliban languages.

Since 1985 a relationship to the Yanomaman languages has also been suggested, in part on the grounds that Hodï shares 20% of its vocabulary with this family.

== Phonology ==
The first phonological analysis is Vilera Díaz (1985). She largely retains the vocalic description of earlier researchers, apart from finding vowel length is a product of emphasis, but does not state whether vowel nasalization is phonemic, and does not provide a minimal pair for /o/ vs /u/.

=== Vowels ===
Vowels (Vilera Díaz 1985)
	oral			nasal		
	front	central	back	front	central	back
close	i	ɨ	u	ĩ	ɨ̃	ũ
mid	e	ɘ ⟨ö⟩	o	ẽ	ɘ̃	õ
open	(ɛ)	a			ã	

[ʌ] is an allophone of /ɘ, [ɔ] is an allophone of /o/, and [æ, a, ɑ] are allophones of /a/. Quatra (2008) maintains that [ɛ] and [ɑ] are distinct phonemes, but does not provide any minimal pairs to demonstrate that. He also maintains that [ɘ] and [ɑ] are only nasalized following nasal consonants.

=== Consonants ===
Consonants (Vilera Díaz 1985)
		Bil.	Dent.	Alv.	Alv-pal	Pal.	Post-pal.	Vel.	Lab-vel	Glot.
Obstruent	voiceless	p	t		tʃ	tʃʲ ~ kʲ		k	kʷ	
Obstruent	voiced	b (ɓ?)	ɗ			dʒ ~ ɲ				
Obstruent	fricative	(β)				dʒ ~ ɲ				h hʷ
Nasal		m	n							
Continuant		w		l		hʲ j				

There is no minimal pair for /β/, so it is not clear that it is a separate phoneme.

/n/ is [ŋ] before a velar. /k/ and /kʲ/ are [ɡ, ɡʲ] after a nasal and occasionally intervocalically. Intervocalic /l/ is [ɺ]. /b/ (perhaps /ɓ/) is [ɓʷ] before /i e o/. /ɗ/ was written 'd' due to lack of typewriter support.

[kʲ] varies as [tʃʲ], and [dʒ] varies as [ɲ] in all contexts, not just adjacent to nasal vowels.

Phonetic aspiration occurs at boundaries, often before voiceless consonants and always before /l/.

Consonants (Quatra 2008)
		Bilabial		Alveolar		Alv-pal		Velar		Glottal
		plain	preasp.	plain	preasp.	plain	preasp.	plain	preasp.	Glottal
Obstruent	voiceless				jt /ʰt/	ky /c/	jky /ʰc/)	k	jk /ʰk/	
Obstruent	voiced	b		d						
Nasal		m		n	jn (/ʰn/)	ñ /ɲ/	jñ /ʰɲ/			
Continuant		w	jw /ʰw/	l	jl /ʰl/	y /j/	jy /ʰj/			j /h/

The voiced stops are realized as nasals [m n] between nasal vowels. The 'aspirated' consonants are pre-aspirated.

== Bibliography ==
- Guarisma P., V.; Coppens, W. (1978). Vocabulario Hoti. Antropológica, 49:3-27.
- Mattei-Müller, M. (1981). Vocabulario Hodï (Hoti). (Manuscript).
- Quatra, Miguel Marcelo; Liye, Jhonny; Liye, Vilma María; Jono, Tito, eds. (2008). Bajkewa jkwïkïdëwa-jya: jodï i̱ne - dodo i̱ne: castellano - jodï = diccionario básico (in Spanish). Caracas: Eds. IVIC, Inst. Venezolano de Investigaciones Científicas. ISBN 978-980-261-096-9.
