= Atures Municipality =

Autònomo Atures Municipality Municipio Autònomo Atures
- Municipality
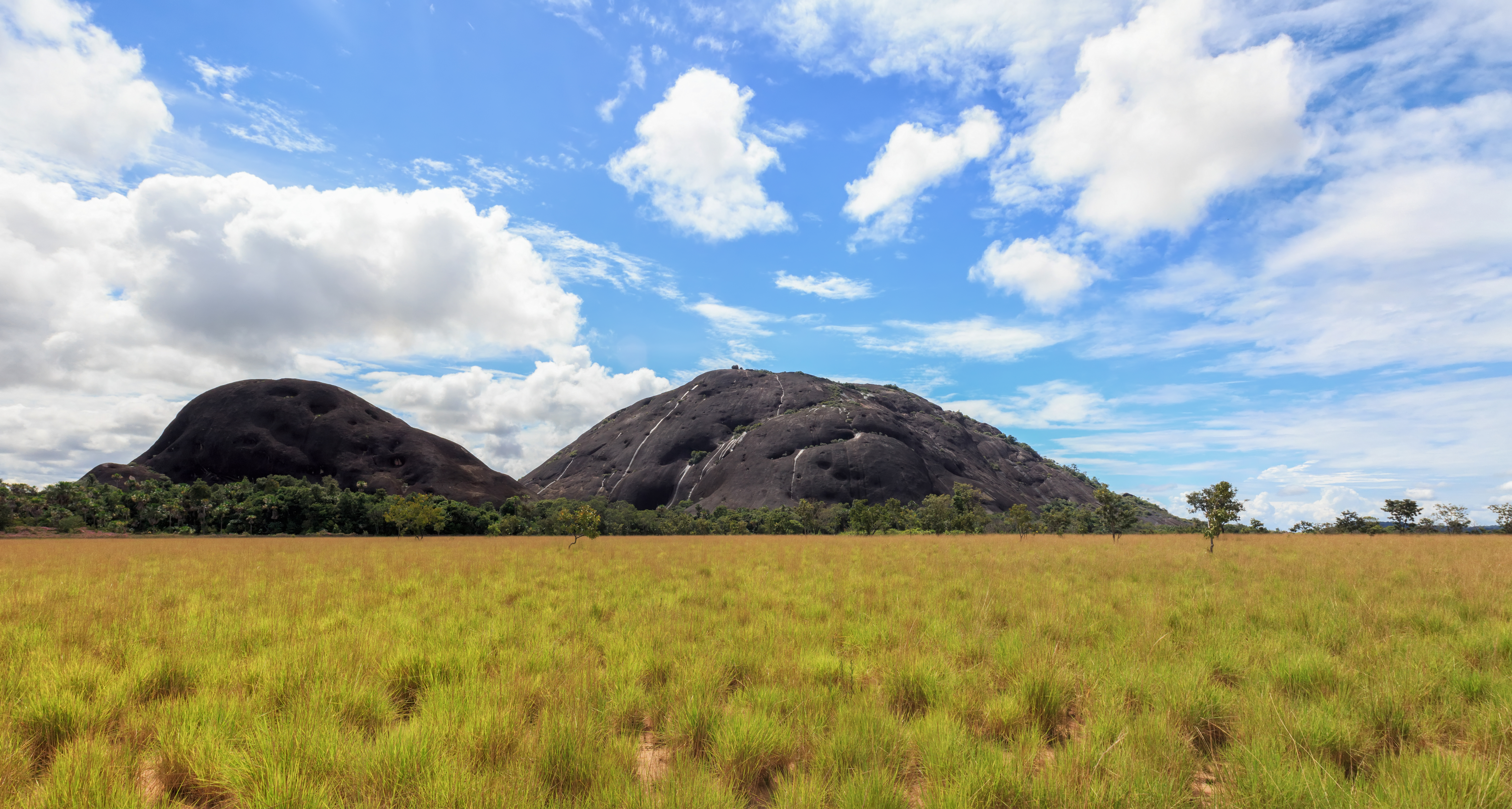
- Piedra la Tortuga Natural Monument, Atures

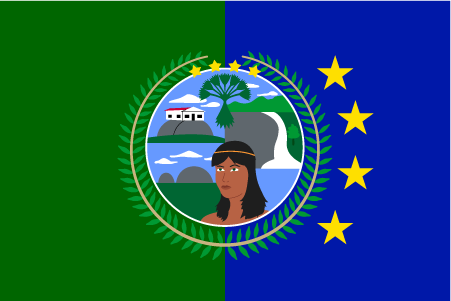
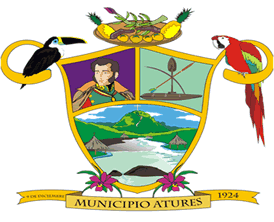
- Flag Coat of arms

- Location in Amazonas

- Location in Venezuela
- Coordinates: 5°44′00″N 67°25′48″W
- Country: Venezuela
- State: Amazonas
- Municipal seat: Puerto Ayacucho

Government
  - Mayor: Mireya Labrador (PPT)

Area
  - Total: 4,010.5 km^{2} (1,548.5 sq mi)

Population (2011)
  - Total: 104,228
  - Density: 25.989/km^{2} (67.311/sq mi)
- Time zone: UTC−4 (VET)
- Area code(s): 0248
- Website: Official website

The Atures Municipality (Spanish: Municipio Atures) is one of the seven municipalities (municipios) that makes up the southern Venezuelan state of Amazonas and, according to the 2011 census by the National Institute of Statistics of Venezuela, the municipality has a population of 104,228. The city of Puerto Ayacucho is the shire town of the Atures Municipality.

== History ==
The city of Puerto Ayacucho was founded to facilitate the transport of goods past the Atures Rapids on the Orinoco River in the late 19th century (mostly rubber).

== Demographics ==
The Atures Municipality, according to a 2007 population estimate by the National Institute of Statistics of Venezuela, has a population of 91,386 (up from 74,066 in 2000). This amounts to 64.3% of the state's population. The municipality's population density is 20.3 inhabitants per square kilometre (53/sq mi).

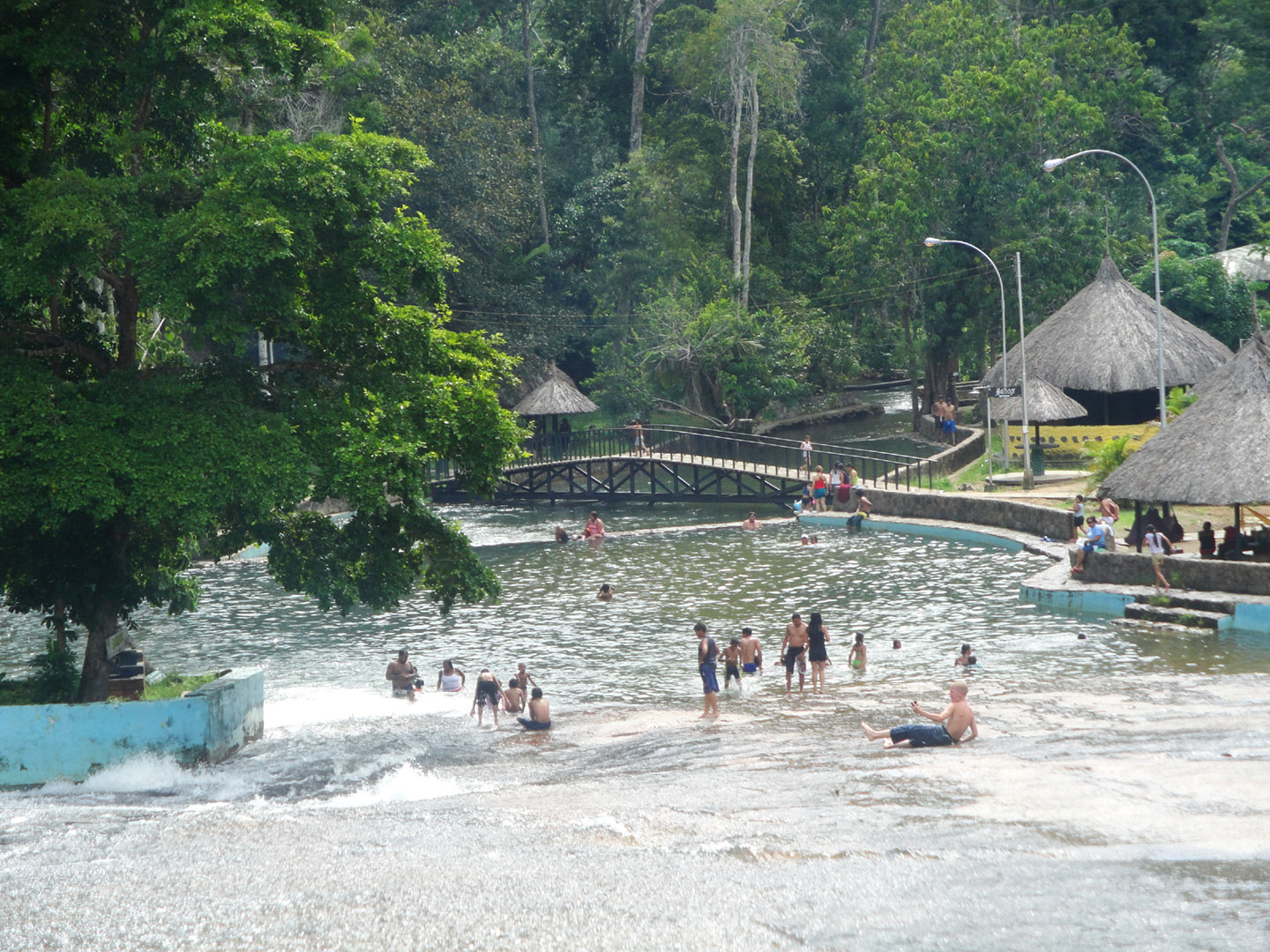
Tobogan de la Selva, Atures Municipality

== Government ==
The mayor of the Atures Municipality is Mireya Labrador, elected on October 31, 2004, with 39% of the vote. She replaced Angel Rodriguez shortly after the elections. The municipality is divided into four parishes; Fernando Girón Tovar, Luis Alberto Gómez, Parhueña, and Platanillal (previous to December 18, 1997, the Atures Municipality contained only a single parish).

== See also ==
- Puerto Ayacucho
- Amazonas
- Municipalities of Venezuela
