= Parguaza River =

Coordinates: 6.4436°N 67.1617°W

Location
- Country: Venezuela

Parguaza River is a river of Venezuela. It is part of the Orinoco River basin.

== See also ==
- List of rivers of Venezuela
