= Saliba language =

Indigenous language of South America

Saliba
- Sáliva
- Native to: Colombia and Venezuela
- Ethnicity: Saliva
- Native speakers: (1,600 cited 1991–2008)
- Language family: Piaroa–Saliban: Saliba
- Writing system: Latin

Language codes
- ISO 639-3: slc
- Glottolog: sali1298
- ELP: Sáliva

Saliba (Spanish: Sáliba, Sáliva) is an Indigenous language of Eastern Colombia and Venezuela. Saliba was used by Jesuit missionaries in the 17th century to communicate with Indigenous peoples of the Meta, Orinoco, and Vichada valleys. An 1856 watercolor by Manuel María Paz is an early depiction of the Saliva people in Casanare Province.

== Use ==
"Saliba was spoken by an ethnic group that lived along the central reaches of the Orinoco River."

"This language group was so isolated that the language was reported extinct in 1965." It is not being passed on to many children, but that practice is being reconsidered. As of 2007, "Sáliva speakers now are almost all bilingual in Spanish, and Sáliva children are only learning Spanish instead of their ancestral language."

As of 2007, "In the Orocué area the language is only conserved to a high degree among elderly women; others understand Sáliba but no longer express themselves in the language." Native speakers have a literacy rate of 1-5%, and second-language speakers have a Sáliba literacy rate of 15-25%.

== Phonology ==
"Sáliba has a limited voicing distinction, and boasts six places of articulation for plosives. There are also two rhotics, and nasal counterparts for each of the five places of articulation for vowels."

Consonants
| | | Bilabial | Alveolar | Palatal | Velar | | Glottal |
| | | Bilabial | Alveolar | Palatal | nor. | lab. | Glottal |
|---|---|---|---|---|---|---|---|
| Stop | Plain | p | t | | k | kʷ | ʔ |
| Stop | Voiced | b | d | | ɡ | ɡʷ | |
| Affricate | Plain | | | t͡ʃ | | | |
| Affricate | Voiced | | | d͡ʒ | | | |
| Fricative | Plain | ɸ | s | | x | | h |
| Fricative | Voiced | β | | | | | |
| Nasal | | m | n | ɲ | | | |
| Rhotic | Flap | | ɾ | | | | |
| Rhotic | Trill | | r | | | | |
| Approximant | | w | l | j | | | |

Vowels
| | Front | Central | Back |
|---|---|---|---|
| Close | i ĩ | | u ũ |
| Mid | e ẽ | | o õ |
| Open | | a ã | |

== Writing system ==
Saliba is written with the Latin alphabet.

The Saliba-Spanish dictionary by Benaissa uses the following orthography:

- Nasal vowels are indicated with a tilde <ã, ẽ, ĩ, õ, ũ>;
- Long vowels are indicated with a double letter <aa, ee, ii, oo, uu>;
- The consonants <c, ch, p, t> are pronounced as doubled sonorants when between two vowels;
- <f> is pronounced as a bilabial fricative;
- <j> represents a glottal fricative and <x> represents a velar fricative;
- <h> represents a glottal stop

Benaissa's alphabet (1991)
| a | ã | b | c | ch | d | e | f | g | h | i | ĩ | j | l | ll | m | n | ñ | o | õ | p | q | r | s | t | u | ũ | w |

The Salibas of Orocué, Caño Mochuelo, and Santa Rosalía have used a different orthography since April 12 2002. This orthography is based in part on the phonetic realisation by María Claudia González Rátiva and Hortensia Estrada Ramírez, and can be considered as a phonological orthography that takes dialectal variation into account.

Saliba alphabet (2002) ·
| a | ã | aa | a’ | b | ch | d | e | ẽ | ee | e’ | f | fw | g | gw | i | ĩ | ii | i’ | j | jw | x |
| xw | k | kw | l | m | n | ñ | o | õ | oo | o’ | p | r | rr | s | t | u | ũ | uu | u’ | y | |

== Grammar ==
"Sáliba is an SOV language with noun classes and nominal classifiers. The language has a rich morphological system. In some cases, the realization of a verbal morpheme depends upon the form of the stem."

== Related languages ==
The extinct Ature language, once spoken on the Orinoco River near the waterfalls of Atures, Venezuela, is unattested but was said to be 'little different' from Saliba. Some have proposed that the Ature were ancestors of the Piaroa people.
