= Auaké people =

Indigenous people in Venezuela

The Auaké are an Indigenous people of the Amazon rainforest of Venezuela and Brazil. They were historically sedentary slash-and-burn farmers, and were also hunters, fishers and gatherers. They speak Arutani. Heavily influenced culturally by the Carib, they adopted agriculture sometime after the 16th century, and further acculturation followed European contact. They are found along the Paragua River and are now considered a subgroup of the Shiriana people. In 2011, 20 Arutani people self-identified themselves in Venezuela; only eight of them claimed to speak the language.
