= Betoi–Jirara language =

Extinct language of Venezuela

Betoi–Jirara
- Native to: Colombia
- Region: Orinoco Llanos
- Ethnicity: 394 Betoi (2005), Jirara
- Extinct: mid 19th century
- Language family: Unclassified (Duho ?)
- Early form: Proto-Betoi-Jirara
- Dialects: Situfa; Airico; Lolaca; Jirara; Betoi; Ele

Language codes
- ISO 639-3: None (mis)
- Glottolog: beto1236
- Linguasphere: 81-MAA-aa
- Map of the Betoi–Jirara language

Betoi–Jirara is an extinct, unclassified and poorly attested dialect cluster of Colombia and Venezuela, south of the Apure River near the modern border with Colombia.

== Name ==
The name "Betoi–Jirara" is derived from the names of two of its dialects, Betoi and Jirara, which was first denominated as such by Jesuit priest Joseph Gumilla as the "lengua Betoya, y Jyrara".

== Classification ==
Historically, Betoi–Jirara was considered a Tucanoan language, hence the original name Betoyan for the family. Other proposed affiliations include Chibchan and Chocoan, though these classifications are unsupported by linguistic evidence. Zamponi (2017) finds enough lexical resemblances between Betoi–Jirara and the Saliban languages to conclude that a genealogical relationship is plausible, though the grammatical similarities may be due to areal influence instead, and the lexical similarities are not that numerous, possibly because only about 150 words are attested in Betoi–Jirara. Because of this, Zamponi (2023) prefers to leave the genetic affiliation of Betoi–Jirara undetermined.

== History ==
At the time of contact, Betoi–Jirara was a local lingua franca spoken between the Uribante and Sarare rivers and along the Arauca. Speakers of Betoi–Jirara were resettled into Catholic missions in the 17th century, leading to the eventual destruction of their culture. By 1760, the language was endangered and being replaced by Spanish, and none of its dialects were spoken after the mid-19th century.

== Varieties ==
Historically a dialect cluster, varieties of Betoi–Jirara include Betoi, Jirara, Situfa, Ayrico, Ele, Lucalia, Jabúe, Arauca, Quilifay, Anabali, Lolaca, Atabaca, "and yet other varieties". Betoi is by far the best attested dialect, known from a grammatical sketch by the Jesuit Lorenzo Hervás, two versions of the Lord's Prayer, a wordlist, and a few sentences in the language in Gumilla's El Orinoco ilustrado, y defendido. A few scattered fragments of the language are also present in two other sources. In contrast, Jirara is attested in three sentences and a few nouns, Situfa, the most divergent from Betoi, is known from two sentences and seven words total, as well as two sentences with nine total words belonging to either the Lolaca or Atabaca dialect. Nothing survives of the other dialects.

The online language database Glottolog groups Betoi–Jirara dialects as follows:

- Betoi-Jirara
  - Nuclear
    - Betoi
    - Jirara
    - Lolaca
    - Mafilito
    - Quilifay
  - Situfa-Ayrico
    - Ayrico
    - Situfa

== Phonology ==
=== Consonants ===
Reports indicate the letters LL, Ñ, and P were absent from Betoi–Jirara, and that the language had many "R"s. A peculiar sound was additionally described as "a letter that sounds very like the pronunciation of consonantal V, but rather it is a totally different letter", but is unattested in the available data.

Betoi–Jirara phonology
		Bilabial	Alveolar (Note: Betoi–Jirara likely did not have dental consonants, like its geographic neighbors.)	Palatal	Velar		Glottal
		Bilabial	Alveolar	Palatal	plain	lab.	Glottal
Stop	voiceless		t		k	(kʷ)^{1}	
Stop	voiced	b	d^{2}		g		
Fricative		ɸ	s				h
Nasal		m	n				
Lateral			l				
Trill			r				
Glide		w		j			

1. [kʷ] may be present in the words cuivivì 'duck, presumably Dendrocygna autumnalis' and quaja 'forest'. It is also present in the nearby Saliban languages and Tunebo (Uwa).
2. ⟨dd⟩ is likely intended to represent an intervocalic voiced stop rather than the intervocalic voiced approximant [ð̞] in Spanish.

=== Vowels ===
Betoi–Jirara appeared to have a 5-vowel system, as illustrated below.

	Front	Central	Back
High	i		u
Mid	e		o
Low		a	

[i] was written as ⟨y⟩ as a part of diphthongs.

== Bibliography ==
- Fabre, Alain (2005). Diccionario etnolingüístico y guía bibliográfica de los pueblos indígenas sudamericanos: BETOI (PDF).
- Zamponi, Raoul (2003). Betoi (PDF). 428. Vol. Languages of the World/Materials. Lincom. p. 66. ISBN 3-89586-757-8.
