= Andoque language =

Language of Colombia

Andoque
- Andoké
- Native to: Colombia, formerly also Peru
- Ethnicity: 820 Andoque people (2018 census)
- Native speakers: 370 (2007); 50 monolinguals (no date)
- Language family: Language isolate
- Dialects: Urequena †

Language codes
- ISO 639-3: ano
- Glottolog: ando1256
- ELP: Andoque
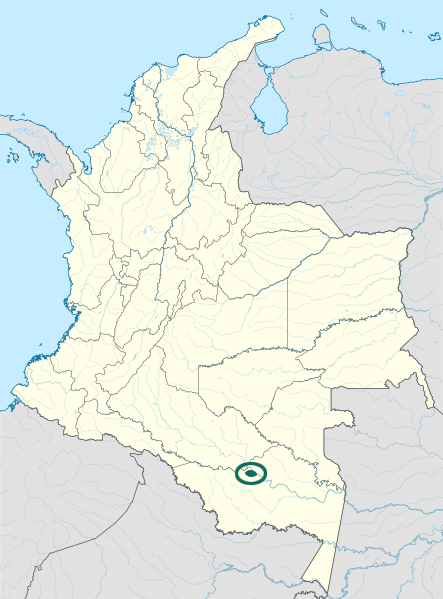

- Andoke is classified as Severely Endangered by the UNESCO Atlas of the World's Languages in Danger.

Andoque is a language spoken by a few hundred Andoque people in Colombia, and is in decline. There were 10,000 speakers in 1908, down to 370 a century later, of which at most 50 are monolingual. The remaining speakers live in four residential areas in the region of the Anduche River, downstream from Araracuara, Solano, Caquetá, Colombia; the language is no longer spoken in Peru. Most speakers shifted to Spanish.

== Classification ==
Andoque may be related to the extinct Urequena language (also Urekena or Arequena) which is known only from a single 19th century wordlist.

Kaufman's (2007) Bora–Witótoan stock includes Andoque in the Witótoan family, but other linguists, such as Richard Aschmann, consider Andoque an isolate.

== Phonology ==
Andoque has been analyzed to have the lowest consonant-to-vowel ratio of any language in the world, with ten consonants and nine vowel qualities. However, other studies (see below) have reported other numbers of consonants and vowels.

=== Vowels ===
	Front	Central	Back
Close	i ĩ	ɯ	u
Mid	e ẽ	ɤ ɤ̃	o õ
Open	a ã	ʌ	ɒ ɒ̃

Landaburu (2000) reports nine oral vowels and six nasal vowels.

=== Consonants ===
		Labial	Coronal	Dorsal	Glottal
Stop	nasal	m	n	ɲ	
Stop	voiced	b	d		
Stop	voiceless	p	t	k	ʔ
Continuant	fricative	ɸ	s	ʝ	h
Continuant	rhotic		r		

The phoneme /ɲ/ is represented orthographically as ⟨ñ⟩ and the phoneme /j/ is written ⟨y⟩.

=== Tone ===
Andoque vowels have one of two phonological tones, low or high, with the low tone being far more frequent. Landaburu (2000) marks high tone vowels with a tilde and leaves low tone vowels unmarked. While some lexemes are distinct only in tone (such as -ka- 'mix' and -ká- 'distribute'), Landaburu notes that many grammatical distinctions are made solely through differences in tone, as in the examples below which differ in tense.

dã-bɤ̃ʌ baʝa
REAL.INGRESSIVE-cry 3M
'he comes to cry'

dã́-bɤ̃ʌ baʝa
IRR-cry 3M
'he will cry'

== Grammar ==
=== Classifiers ===
The subject noun does not appear alone, but is accompanied by markers for gender or noun classifiers (which are determined by shape). These noun classifiers are as follows:

		Animate		
		Masculine	Feminine	Collective
Animate	Present	-ya-	-î-	-ə-
Animate	Absent	-o-	-ô-	-ə-
Inanimate	Flexible or hollow	-o-		
Inanimate	Rigid or elongated	-ô-		
Inanimate	Other	-ó-		

Person markers include o- ("I"), ha- ("you (singular)"), ka- ("we") and kə- ("you (plural)").

The adjectival or verbal predicate has a suffix which agrees with the subject: -ʌ for animate subjects and flexible or hollow ones; -ó for rigid or elongated ones; -i for others. Adjectival and verbal predicates are also marked with prefixes indicating mood, direction or aspect, and infixes for tense. The nominal predicate (What something is) does not have a suffix of agreement nor a dynamic prefix, but it can take infixes for tense and mood, like the verb. Other grammatical roles (benefactive, instrumental, locative) appear outside the verb in the form of markers for case. There are 11 case suffixes.

=== Evidentials ===
In addition, the sentence has markers for the source of knowledge, or evidentials indicating whether the speaker knows the information communicated firsthand, heard it from another person, has deduced it, etc.

There is also a focus marker -nokó, which draws attention to the participants or indicates the highlight of a story. In the language there are means of representing action from the point of view of the subject or other participants, or from the point of view of an external observer.

== Vocabulary ==
=== Landaburu (2000) ===
Landaburu (2000) gives the following Swadesh list table for Andoque:

no.	Spanish gloss	English gloss	Andoque
1.	yo	I	o-ʔɤ
2.	tú	you	ha-ʔɤ
3.	nosotros	we	kẽ-ʔɤ̃
4.	ésto	this	ʌɲẽ́
5.	hoja	leaf	-sedɤ̃
6.	aquel	that	ʌdí
7.	¿quién?	who?	kó-i
8.	¿qué?	what?	hi-ʌ
g.	no	not	hʌ́ʌ-bã́
10.	todos	all	sí-õ-kɤ̃
11.	muchos	many	hʌ́ʌ-pãã́, ɯ́ɯ-kɤ̃
12.	largo	one	bɤ̃kɤ̃-
13.	uno	two	ʌisidé
14.	dos	big	ʌ-ʌ́hʌbã́
15.	grande	long	ĩʔõ-kɤ̃
16.	perro	dog	ĩɲõ
17.	chico	small	uʔ-pãã́-ɲé-ʌ
18.	mujer	woman	tiʔi
19.	hombre	person	ʝóʔhʌ
20.	pescado	fish	bei
21.	pájaro	bird	hiʌɸo
22.	piojo	louse	táʔsi
23.	cola	tail	-dɤ̃ta
24.	árbol	tree	kɤ̃́ʔɤ̃dɤ
25.	semilla	seed	-tapi
26.	raíz	root	-ɲeko
27.	corteza	bark	-tasi
28.	piel	skin	-tasi
29.	carne	flesh	-ɤ̃ta
30.	sangre	blood	-duʔs
31.	hueso	bone	-tadɤ̃
32.	grasa	grease	kẽɤ̃i
33.	huevo	egg	-hádɤ
34.	cuerno	horn	-si
35.	pluma	feather	-ɲeɸʌ
36.	parado	standing	taɲe-
37.	cabello	hair	ka-tai ʌka-be
38.	cabeza	head	-tai
39.	oreja	ear	-bei
40.	ojo	eye	-ʔákʌ
41.	nariz	nose	-pɤta
42.	boca	mouth	-ɸi
43.	diente	tooth	-kódi
44.	lengua	tongue	-sodɤ̃
45.	rodilla	knee	-kodoi
46.	garra, uña	claw, nail	-sikopɤ
47.	pie	foot	-dʌka
48.	mano	hand	-dobi
49.	barriga	belly	-tura
50.	cuello	neck	-ɲekɤ̃́i
51.	senos	breasts	-ɲeé
52.	corazón	heart	-pĩ́tú
53.	hígado	liver	-tú
54.	beber	drink	-kóʔ-
55.	comer	eat	-baʔi-
56.	morder	bite	-ʝu-
57.	ver	see	-do-
58.	oir	hear	-tó-
59.	saber	know	-do-
60.	dormir	sleep	-pʌ-
61.	morir	die	ĩ-hʌ́ʌ-
62.	matar	kill	-buʔ-
63.	nadar	swim	-ɲṍẽi-
64.	volar	fly	-bu-
65.	andar, caminar	walk	-tá-
66.	venir	come	da-ɤ̃-
67.	acostado	lying down	se-aɲe-
68.	dar	give	-ĩ-
69.	sentado	seated	ʝi-ɸɤʌ́-aɲe-
70.	decir	say	-kɤ̃-/-ẽʔ-
71.	sol	sun	ĩɒ̃
72.	luna	moon	pódɤɤ̃
73	estrella	star	ɸʌʔko
74.	agua	water	dúʔu
75	lluvia	rain	dɤ-i
76.	piedra	stone	ɸisi
77.	arena	sand	poʔsɒ̃ɤ̃
78.	tierra	earth	ɲṍʔĩ
79.	nube	cloud	bóasiakʌi dɤ̃kɤ̃
80.	humo	smoke	bóasiakʌi
81.	fuego	fire	ʌʔpa
82.	ceniza	ashes	pʌtakoi
83.	arder	burn	-du-
84.	camino	path	dubɤ, õbɤ
85.	cerro	mountain	toʌ́i
86.	rojo	red	peo-
87.	verde	green	paʝo-
88.	amarillo	yellow	dóɒ-
89.	blanco	white	poʔté
90.	negro	black	uo-
91.	noche	night	hʌʔpʌ́ʌ
92.	caliente	hot	pã-
93.	frio	cold	dõsi-ko-
94.	lleno	full	ɸiʔ
95.	nuevo	new	pá-
96.	bueno	good	ɸɤɲe-
97.	redondo	round	-tude 'bola' ("ball")
98.	seco	dry	ʝɒʔɒ-
99.	nombre	name	-ti

== Bibliography ==
- Aschmann, Richard P. (1993). Proto Witotoan. Publications in linguistics (No. 114). Arlington, TX: SIL & the University of Texas at Arlington.
- Campbell, Lyle. (1997). American Indian languages: The historical linguistics of Native America. New York: Oxford University Press. ISBN 0-19-509427-1.
- Greenberg, Joseph H. (1987). Language in the Americas. Stanford: Stanford University Press.
- Kaufman, Terrence. (1994). The native languages of South America. In C. Mosley & R. E. Asher (Eds.), Atlas of the world's languages (pp. 46–76). London: Routledge.
- Landaburu, J. (1979). La Langue des Andoke (Grammaire Colombienne). (Langues et Civilisations a Tradition Orale, 36). Paris: SELAF.
