= Cariban languages =

Group of languages

Cariban
- Geographic distribution: Mostly within north-central South America, with extensions in the southern Caribbean and in Central America.
- Linguistic classification: Je–Tupi–Carib?: Cariban
- Subdivisions: Parukotoan; Pekodian; Kuikuroan; Venezuelan; Pemón–Panare Mapoyo–Tamanaku: Guianian; Taranoan: Opón–Yukpa; Yawaperí; Apalaí

Language codes
- Glottolog: cari1283
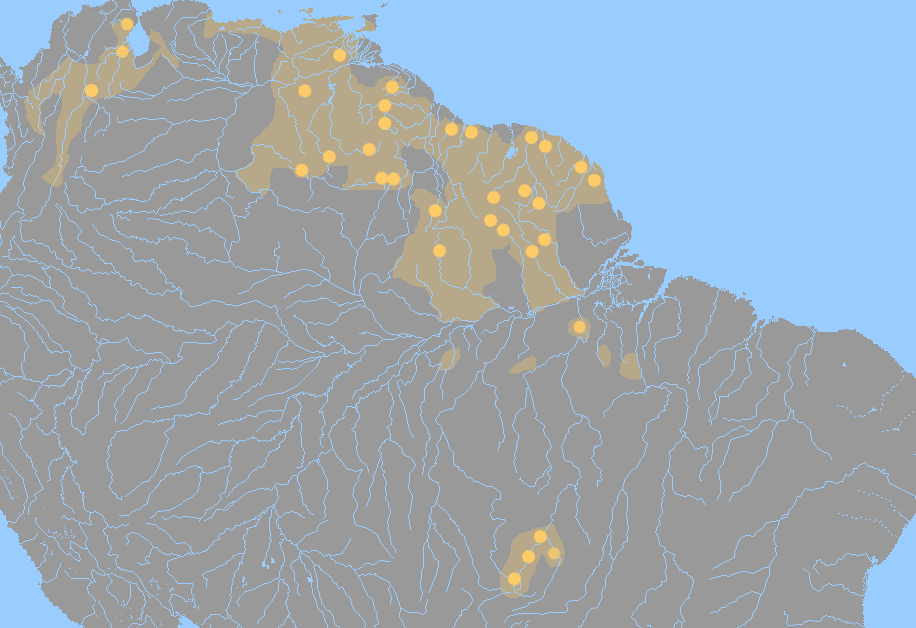
- Present location of Cariban languages, c. 2000, and probable extent in the 16th century.

The Cariban languages are a family of languages Indigenous to north-eastern South America. They are widespread across northernmost South America, from the mouth of the Amazon River to the Colombian Andes, and they are also spoken in small pockets of central Brazil. The languages of the Cariban family are relatively closely related. There are about three dozen, but most are spoken only by a few hundred people. Macushi is the only language among them with numerous speakers, estimated at 30,000. The Cariban family is well known among linguists partly because one language in the family—Hixkaryana—has a default word order of object–verb–subject. Prior to their discovery of this, linguists presumed that this order did not exist in any spoken natural language.

== Genetic relations ==
The Cariban languages share irregular morphology with the Jê and Tupian families. Ribeiro connects them all in a Je–Tupi–Carib family. Meira, Gildea, & Hoff (2010) note that likely morphemes in proto-Tupian and proto-Cariban are good candidates for being cognates, but that work so far is insufficient to make definitive statements.

== Language contact ==
Jolkesky (2016) notes that there are lexical similarities with the Guato, Kawapana, Nambikwara, Taruma, Warao, Arawak, Bororo, Jeoromitxi, Karaja, Rikbaktsa, and Tupi language families due to contact.

Extensive lexical similarities between Cariban and various Macro-Jê languages suggest that Cariban languages had originated in the Lower Amazon region (rather than in the Guiana Highlands). There they were in contact with early forms of Macro-Jê languages, which were likely spoken in an area between the Parecis Plateau and upper Araguaia River.

== Family division ==
The Cariban languages are closely related. In many cases where one of the languages is more distinct, this is due to influence from neighboring languages rather than an indication that it is not closely related. According to Kaufman (2007), "Except for Opon, Yukpa, Pimenteira and Palmela (and possibly Panare), the Cariban languages are not very diverse phonologically and lexically (though more so than Romance, for example)."

=== Previous classifications ===
Good data had been collected on most Cariban languages by c. 2000; classifications prior to that time (including Kaufman 2007, which relies on Kaufman 1994) are unreliable.

Several such classifications have been published; the one shown here, by Derbyshire (1999) divides Cariban into seven branches. A traditional geographic classification into northern and southern branches is cross referenced with (N) or (S) after each language.

- Cariban
  - Galibi [Kaliña] (N)
  - Guiana Carib (Taranoan):
    - Trio: Tiriyó–Akuriyó †, Salumá (N), Carijona–Hianákoto (S)
    - Kashuyana: Sikiana (N), Kaxuiâna [Warikyana] † (S)
    - Waiwai: Hixkaryána (S), Waiwai (N)
      Kaufman breaks this up into its constituent branches
  - North Amazonian Carib:
    - Yawaperi: Atruahí [Atrowari, Waimiri] (N)
    - Pemong: Macushi–Pemon [Arekuna], Akawaio–Patamona (= Kapong, Ingariko) (N)
    - Paravilyana: Pawishiana †
      Kaufman breaks this up into its constituent branches, adding Purukotó † to Pemong; Boanarí † to Atruahí; Paravilyana † and Sapará † to Pawishiana
  - Central Carib:
    - Wayana–Apalaí (N)
    - Maquiritari [Dekwana] (S)
    - Mapoyo–Yabarana–Pémono (N)
      Kaufman adds Chaima [Kumaná]; Arakajú † (to Wayana); Yao † and Tiverikoto †; Wajumará † (to Makiritare)
      Tamanaku is close to Mapoyo
  - South Amazonian Carib:
    - Bakairi: Bakairí, Kuikúro [Kalapálo, Amonap], Matipuhy [Nahukwa] † (S)
    - Arara: Txikão [Ikpeng, Chikaon], Arára [Pará] (N)
      To Arara Kaufman adds extinct Juma †, Apiaká-Apingi †, Yarumá †
  - Yukpa:
    - Japrería (N)
    - Yukpa (N)
    - Coyaima (N) †
  - Panare (N)
  - Opon [Opón-Karare] †
- Unclassified:
  - Pimenteira †
  - Palmela †

The extinct Patagón de Perico language of northern Peru also appears to have been a Cariban language, perhaps close to Carijona. Yao is so poorly attested that Gildea believes it may never be classified.

=== Loukotka (1968) ===
Below is a full list of Cariban language varieties listed by Loukotka (1968), including names of unattested varieties.

Cariban language varieties listed by Loukotka (1968)

Western languages:

- Caraib / Calinago / Karib – language spoken by the insular and continental Caraibes, with many dialects:
  - Dialect of the insular Caraibes, once spoken on the Lesser Antilles Islands, now by only a few old individuals in a reserve on the island of Dominica.
  - Dialect of Pomeroon / Caribisi / Acarabisi – spoken on the Macarani River and Pomeroon River, Guyana.
  - Tabare / Cariña – dialect spoken by the inhabitants of the villages of El Guasey, Cachipo, Cachama, and San Joaquín de Parire (Mapicure) in the state of Anzoátegui and in the village of Tapaquire in the state of Bolívar, Venezuela.
  - Caribe – extinct dialect once spoken by the descendants of Caraibes and by the mixed population on the plains of Barcelona, states of Monagas and Anzoátegui, Venezuela.
  - Carif / Moreno – dialect combined with Arawakan, spoken by the Negro Indian mixed population of British Honduras, in Guatemala on the Gulf of Honduras, and on Roatan Island in Honduras, Central America.
  - Cariniaco – extinct dialect once spoken at the mouth of the Caura River, state of Bolívar, Venezuela.
  - Mayé – extinct dialect once spoken on the Casipore River, Amapá territory, Brazil. (Unattested.)
  - Paracoto – extinct dialect once spoken at the mouth of the Araguari River, Amapá and at the mouth of the Mana River, French Guiana. (Unattested.)
  - Carane – once spoken at the old mission of São Paulo d'Oiapoque, Amapá territory. (Unattested.)
  - Norac / Norag – once spoken on the Approuague River, French Guiana, later on the Anotarí River; now extinct. (Unattested.)
  - Itutan – once spoken on the lower course of the Casipore River and in the Serra Lombard, Amapá. (Unattested.)
  - Curucuane – once spoken on the lower course of the Casipore River, south of the Itutan tribe. (Unattested.)
  - Aricarí – once spoken near the Curucuane tribe on the lower course of the Calçoene River. (Unattested.)
  - Sapai – once spoken on the Mana River, French Guiana. (Unattested.)
  - Piriou – once spoken in French Guiana on the middle course of the Oyapoque River. (Unattested.)
  - Mersiou – once spoken on the Aratye River, Inini River, and Aua River, French Guiana, now probably extinct. (Unattested.)
  - Acoqua – once spoken at the sources of the Approuague River, and on the Camopi River, French Guiana. (Unattested.)
  - Wai – spoken on the Tamouri River, French Guiana; now perhaps extinct. (Unattested.)
  - Taira – spoken in the same colony as the Wai tribe on the Iracoubo River. (Unattested.)
  - Acuria – originally spoken on the Nickerie River and Coppename River, Suriname; now on the Berbice River, Guyana. (Unattested.)
  - Chacoi – spoken by a few mixed individuals between the Berbice River and Essequibo River, Guyana. (Unattested.)
  - Parabaiana – once spoken on the middle course of the Marouini River, French Guiana. (Unattested.)
  - Caicuchiana – once spoken in French Guiana, south of the Parabaiana tribe. (Unattested.)

Eastern languages

- Waiana / Oayana – spoken on the Palumeu River and Lawa River, Suriname, and on the Jarí River and Paru River, state of Pará, Brazil; once also between the Maroni River and Marouini River, French Guiana.
- Amicuan – extinct language once spoken at the sources of the Marouini River, French Guiana. (Unattested.)
- Upurui – once spoken on the upper course of the Jarí River, now by a few individuals at the sources of the Parú de Leste River, state of Pará, Brazil.
- Apalai / Aparai – spoken on the middle course of the Parú de Leste River and between this river and the upper course of the Maicuru River, Pará.
- Carapeuara – extinct language once spoken in the state of Pará south of the Apama tribe on the Maicuru River. (Unattested.)
- Palanc – extinct language once spoken in French Guiana on the middle course of the Apima River and Yaroupi River and on the Unani River. (Unattested.)
- Rucuyene – extinct language once spoken in the same colony on the Lawa River.
- Noyene – once spoken on the Cuc River, state of Pará. (Unattested.)
- Yapacoye – once spoken on the left bank of the Itany River, French Guiana. (Unattested.)
- Aracajú / Uaraguazú – extinct language mixed with many Tupi elements, once spoken on the Gurupamba River and Parú de Leste River, Pará.

Trio group

- Trio / Diáu / Tirió – spoken on the Tapanahoni River, Corentijn River, and Palumeu River, Suriname, and between the sources of the Parú de Leste River and Parú de Oeste River, state of Pará.
- Urucuyana / Waiano – spoken on the left bank of the Parú de Leste River, Pará.
- Wama – spoken by a wild tribe at the sources of the Oelemari River, Suriname.
- Tliometesen / Oyaricule – spoken by a few individuals between the Litani River and Tapanahoni River, Suriname.
- Ocomayana / Kumayena / Comayana – spoken at the sources of the Coeroeni River, Suriname, and at the sources of the Oronoque River in Guyana.
- Pianocoto – once spoken at the sources of the Trombetas River and the Jamunda River, now at the mouth of the Marapi River in the Parú de Oeste River, Pará.
- Aramihoto – spoken by a small tribe in Suriname on the upper course of the Coeroeni River. (Unattested.)
- Prohyana – spoken in the same colony in the Eilerts de Haan Gebergte. (Unattested.)
- Maipuridjana – spoken in Suriname on the Sipaliwini River. (Unattested.)
- Rangú – spoken at the sources of the Parú de Oeste River, Pará.
- Acuriyo – spoken at the sources of the Tapanahoni River, Suriname. (Unattested.)
- Aramisho – spoken on the upper course of the Parú de Leste River, Pará. (Unattested.)
- Aramayana – spoken by the southern neighbors of the Aramisho tribe. (Unattested.)
- Aramagoto – spoken between the upper courses of the Parú de Leste River and the Parú de Oeste River, Pará. (Unattested.)
- Pianoi – spoken at the sources and on the upper course of the Citaré River, Pará. (Unattested.)

Chiquena group

- Chiquena / Shikiana – spoken on the Apiniwau River, Guyana, and at the sources of the Panemá River, Pará. (Farabee 1924, pp. 195–196.)
- Zurumata – once spoken in a village of the same name on the upper course of the Trombetas River, Pará, now probably extinct. (Unattested.)
- Ingarüne – spoken at the sources of the Panemá River and its tributaries. (Unattested.)
- Salumá / Charúma – spoken between the upper courses of the Trombetas River, Uanabé River, and Tunúru River, Pará.
- Prehnoma – spoken by a small tribe west of the Pianocoto tribe. (Unattested.)
- Caicusiana – spoken on the Tunúru River south of the Salumá tribe. (Unattested.)
- Tunayana – spoken between the middle courses of the Panemá River and Tunúru River. (Unattested.)
- Sereu – spoken east of the sources of the Cachorro River. (Unattested.)
- Cahuyana – spoken on the middle course of the Trombetas River. (Unattested.)
- Marachó – spoken by an unknown tribe on the middle course of the Cuminá River. (Unattested.)
- Pauxi / Pawiyana – spoken on the right bank of the middle course of the Erepecurú River (Cuminá River); now perhaps extinct.
- Waríkyana – extinct language once spoken on the lower course of the Trombetas River. (Unattested.)
- Uayeué – spoken on the Mapuera River and its tributary Urubú de Silves River.
- Cachuena / Kaxiuâna / Casiana / Cachoarí – spoken by a few families at the mouth of the Cachorro River.
- Mutuan – once spoken on the lower course of the Nhamundá River.
- Cariguano – once spoken on the Panemá River. (Unattested.)
- Conduri – extinct language once spoken at the mouth of the Nhamundá River. (Unattested.)
- Paraugoaru – extinct language once spoken on the Capó River, a tributary of the Trombetas River. (Unattested.)

Waiwai group

- Waiwai / Woaywai – spoken at the sources of the Essequibo River, Guyana and at the sources of the Mapuera River, state of Pará, Brazil.
- Faranakaru – spoken at the sources of the Mapuera River south of the Waiwai tribe. (Unattested.)
- Faranauaru – spoken on the left bank of the Mapuera River. (Unattested.)
- Parucoto / Katawian – spoken on the middle course of the Mapuera River and between the sources of the Acarí River and Cachorrinho River. (Farabee 1924, pp. 192–193.)
- Chiriwiyana – spoken at the sources of the Acarí River. (Unattested.)
- Ororicó – spoken on the upper course of the Cachorrinho River. (Unattested.)
- Cotonúru – spoken between the Cachorro River and Cachorrinho River. (Unattested.)
- Totocumu / Catuena – spoken between the sources of the Acarí River and Ipitinga River. (Unattested.)
- Chawiyana – spoken on the right bank of the upper course of the Nhamundá River, Amazonas. (Unattested.)
- Uaiboí / Babui / Wabou – spoken on the middle course of the Nhamundá River.
- Hishcariana / Ishkariyána / Tucano – spoken on the middle course of the Nhamundá River.
- Xauwiyana – spoken by the neighbors of the Hishcariana tribe. (Unattested.)
- Uasaí – spoken by an unknown tribe on the Urubu River and Jatapu River, Amazonas. (Unattested.)
- Apoto / Apanto – extinct language once spoken south of the Uaiboi tribe on the Nhamundá River. (Unattested.)
- Orocoto – once spoken between the Urubu River and Jatapu River. (Unattested.)
- Taguari – extinct language once spoken between the Mapuera River and Ipitinga River. (Unattested.)
- Pariquí – once spoken between the mouths of the Uatumã River and Negro River. (Unattested.)
- Tapicari – spoken on the Mucajaí River. (Unattested.)
- Bonari / Boanari – once spoken on the Uatumã River, Amazonas; now perhaps extinct.

Yauapery group

- Yauapery / Atroahi – spoken on the middle course of the Yauapery River, state of Amazonas.
- Uaimiri / Wahmirí – spoken at the sources of the Curiuaú River, state of Amazonas.
- Crixaná / Quirixana – spoken between the middle course of the Yauapery River and the Curiuaú River, now probably extinct.

Pauishana group

- Pauishana – spoken between the Catrimani River and Branco River, territory of Rio Branco, Brazil.

Macusi group

- Macusi / Makushí – spoken on the Rupununi River, Guyana, and at the sources of the Tacutu River and on the middle course of the Branco River, territory of Rio Branco, Brazil. (The following five names all refer to local subgroups of the Macushi.)
- Monoicó – spoken on the Cotingo River, Brazil. (Unattested.)
- Keseruma – spoken on the Tacutu River. (A. Meyer 1951.)
- Asepáng – spoken to the south of the Keseruma tribe. (Unattested.)
- Eliáng – spoken to the south of the Asepáng tribe. (Unattested.)
- Pezacó – spoken to the south of the Eliáng tribe. (Unattested.)
- Quenoloco – spoken at the sources of the Cotingo River. (Unattested.)
- Teweia – spoken on the Cotingo River. (Unattested.)
- Purucotó / Progoto – spoken on the Uraricapará River, territory of Rio Branco.
- Wayumara / Azumara / Guimara – spoken between the Mucajaí River and Uraricoera River and in a part of Maracá Island.
- Paraviyana / Paravilhana – extinct language once spoken between the Tacutu River and Caratirimani River, Rio Branco.
- Zapara / Sapará – spoken in the middle and eastern parts of Maracá Island.

Pemón group

- Taurepän / Taulipáng / Ipuricoto / Pemón – spoken between the Uraricuena River and Mount Roraima to the Caroní River, in the border zone of Brazil and Venezuela.
- Arecuná – spoken at the sources of the Caroní River and Paragua River, state of Bolívar, Venezuela.
- Ingaricó – spoken to the north of Mount Roraima, border region of Brazil and Venezuela.
- Patamona – spoken on the Potaro River and Ireng River, Guyana. (F. Lutz 1912 passim, only a few words.)
- Camaracoto – spoken in the state of Bolívar, Venezuela, on the Paragua River and Caroní River.
- Arinagoto – once spoken on the Paragua River, state of Bolívar, now perhaps extinct. (Unattested.)
- Paraparucota – once spoken between the Caura River and Cuchivero River, state of Bolívar; now extinct. (Unattested.)
- Quiriquiripa – extinct language once spoken on the left bank of the Caura River. (Unattested.)
- Aguaricoto – extinct language once spoken on the lower course of the Caura River, the same region. (Unattested.)
- Serecong / Sarrakong – once spoken in the same region at the sources of the Mahú River. (Unattested.)
- Chiricum – once spoken by the western neighbors of the Taurepán tribe in the Rio Branco territory. (Unattested.)
- Achirigoto – once spoken on the left bank of the Caura River, middle course, in the state of Bolívar. (Unattested.)
- Paudacoto – once spoken in the state of Bolívar at the sources of the Aro River. (Unattested.)
- Cachirigoto – once spoken in the state of Bolívar south of the Camaracotó tribe. (Unattested.)
- Barinagoto – once spoken at the mouth of the Caroní River, Bolívar state, Venezuela. (Unattested.)
- Arebato – once spoken in the village of Cuchara on the Caura River in the state of Bolívar, now perhaps extinct. (Unattested.)
- Armacoto – once spoken in the same region between the Paragua River and Merevari River. (Unattested.)
- Mauitsi – once spoken at the sources of the Paragua River in the same region. (Unattested.)
- Uaica / Waica – spoken by a few families on the Yuruari River and Cuyuni River, state of Bolívar.
- Acawai / Capong – spoken in Guyana on the Moruca River, Cuyuni River, Acarabisi River, and Pomeroon River.

Maquiritaré group

- Decuána / Deukwana / Maquiritaré – spoken on the Caura River, Ventuari River, Merevari River, and Auari River, state of Bolívar and Amazonas territory, Venezuela, and between the Cotingo River and Majari River, territory of Rio Branco, Brazil.
- Yecuaná / Mayongcong – spoken on the Caura River southwest of the Arecuna tribe, state of Bolívar, Venezuela.
- Ihuruána – spoken at the sources of the Ventuari River, territory of Amazonas, Venezuela.
- Cunuaná / Kunuhana – spoken in the same territory at the sources of the Cunucunuma River. (only four words.)
- Morononi – extinct language once spoken in the same territory on the Ventuari River. (Unattested.)
- Puipuitene – extinct language once spoken on the same river in the same territory by the neighbors of the Decuaná tribe. (Unattested.)
- Acariana – once spoken by the neighbors of the Morononi tribe on the Orinoco River. (Unattested.)
- Ocomesiane – once spoken in the same region on the Padamo River. (Unattested.)
- Areviriana – once spoken by the eastern neighbors of the Ihuruána tribe. (Unattested.)
- Jure – once spoken on the left bank of the middle course of the Ventuari River. (Unattested.)
- Pishauco / Pshavaco – once spoken on the Serra Tepequem, Rio Branco territory. (Unattested.)
- Mejepure – once spoken on the left ban1e of the lower course of the Ventuari River. (Unattested.)
- Aberiana – once spoken by the neighbors of the Acariana tribe on the upper course of the Orinoco River. (Unattested.)

Mapoyo group

- Mapoyo / Nepoyo – spoken by a small tribe between the Parguaza River and Suapure River, state of Bolívar, Venezuela.
- Carinuaca – extinct language once spoken in the area between the Ihuruána and Yauarána tribes, territory of Amazonas, Venezuela. (Unattested.)
- Curasicana / Kurushikiána / Orechicano – once spoken at the sources of the Biehita River, now by only a few individuals. (Unattested.)
- Wökiare / Uaiquire – unknown language spoken in the same region on the Paru River. (Unattested.)
- Yauarána / Yabarána – language spoken in the same territory on the Manapiare River.
- Quaqua – once spoken by the northern neighbors of the Mapoyo tribe. (Unattested.)
- Guaquiri – once spoken by the northern neighbors of the Curasicana tribe. (Unattested.)
- Pareca – spoken in the region west of the Cuchivero River, now probably extinct. (Unattested.)
- Taparito – extinct language once spoken on the middle course of the Caura River. (Unattested.)
- Cadupinapo – once spoken by the southern neighbors of the Achirigoto tribe. (Unattested.)
- Tabajari – now probably extinct, once spoken on the left bank of the Erebato River, state of Bolívar. (Unattested.)

Panare group

- Panáre – language of a small tribe, spoken at the sources of the Cuchivero River, state of Bolívar, Venezuela.
- Abira – once spoken at the sources of the Manapiare River. (Unattested.)
- Eye – once spoken by the southwestern neighbors of the Panáre tribe at the sources of the Cuchivero River. (Unattested.)

Tamanaco group

- Tamanaco – extinct language once spoken along the Orinoco River from the mouth of the Caroni River to the mouth of the Cuchivero River, state of Bolívar, Venezuela.
- Chayma / Guarapiche / Sayma – extinct language once spoken on the Guarapiche River, state of Anzoátegui, Venezuela.
- Cumanagota – extinct language once spoken on the Cabo Codera and near Cumaná, state of Sucre, Venezuela.
- Tivericoto – once spoken on the coast of the state of Monagas, Venezuela
- Palenque – once spoken between the Unare River and Tamanaco River, Guárico state.
- Caraca – once spoken around the modern capital of Caracas, Venezuela. (A. Espinosa (Vazquez de Espinosa) 1948, pp. 36–37, only a few words.)
- Ciparigoto – extinct language once spoken on the Yaracuy River and Aroa River, state of Yaracuy. (Unattested.)
- Teque – once spoken in the Guaire valley, state of Miranda. (Unattested.)
- Tacarigua – once spoken around Lake Valencia, Miranda. (Unattested.)
- Toromaina – once spoken on the San Pedro River, federal district of Venezuela. (Unattested.)
- Arbaco – once spoken around the modern city of Victoria, state of Aragua. (Unattested.)
- Meregoto – once spoken on the western shore of Lake Valencia in the state of Aragua. (Unattested.)
- Quiriquire – extinct language once spoken on the Tuy River and Misoa River, state of Miranda. (Oramas 1918a, only a few patronyms.)
- Chapacuare – once spoken in the Pascua valley, state of Guárico. (Unattested.)
- Tarma – once spoken near the modern city of Maracay, state of Aragua. (Unattested.)
- Mariche – once spoken in the Baruta valley, state of Miranda. (Unattested.)
- Guayqueri – extinct language once spoken on the Paoviejo River, state of Cojedes. (Gumilla 1745, pt. 2, pp. 67–68, only one phrase.)
- Tomuza – once spoken between the Chico River and Piritú River, states of Miranda and Anzoátegui. (Unattested.)
- Haerena / Guarena – once spoken between the Guarenas River and Guatire River, state of Anzoátegui. (Unattested.)
- Piritú – once spoken around the modern city of Puerto Píritu, state of Anzoátegui. (Unattested.)
- Tagare – once spoken on the coast of the Gulf of Cariaco, state of Sucre. (Unattested.)
- Pariagoto / Guayuno – extinct language once spoken on the Paria Peninsula in the state of Sucre.
- Chamaygua – once spoken in the state of Sucre by the neighbors of the Cumanagota tribe. (Unattested.)

Yao group

- Yao / Anacaioury – language once spoken by two tribes: one on the western part of the island of Trinidad; the other in French Guiana on the Ivaricopo River and Cau River.

Shebayi group

- Shebayi / Supaye – extinct language once spoken in the Guianas; exact location is unknown.

Motilon group

- Yupe / Motilon – spoken by many tribes in the Sierra de Perijá, state of Zulia, Venezuela, and in the department of Magdalena, Colombia. Dialects:
  - Chague / Apon – spoken on the Apon River, Zulia.
  - Iroca – spoken on the Casacará River, Magdalena.
  - Macoa – spoken on the Yasa River and Negro River, Zulia.
  - Manastara – spoken on the Becerril River, Zulia.
  - Maraca – spoken by a tribe at the source of the Machigue River and on the Maraca River, Magdalena.
  - Parirí – spoken to the south of the Apon River.
  - Shapáru / Chaparro – spoken by the western neighbors of the Parirí tribe, Zulia.
  - Uasamo – spoken in the same area by the northern neighbors of the Shapáru tribe. (Unattested.)
  - Susa – spoken in the central part of the Sierra de Perijá, Magdalena. (Unattested.)
  - Manaure – spoken on the left bank of the lower course of the La Paz River, Magdalena. (Unattested.)
  - Tucushmo – spoken by the northern neighbors of the Iroca tribe, Magdalena. (Unattested.)
  - Socorpa – spoken in the same area by the northern neighbors of the Maracá tribe. (Unattested.)
  - Curumaní – spoken south of the Tucui River, Magdalena. (Unattested.)
  - Socomba – spoken between the sources of the Maracá River and Tucui River, formerly also on the Buenavista River, Magdalena. (Unattested.)
  - Tucuco – spoken at the sources of the Tucuco River, Zulia. (Unattested.)
  - Shiquimu – spoken by the southwestern neighbors of the Shaparu tribe, Zulia. (Unattested.)
  - Irapa – spoken by the eastern neighbors of the Shiguimu tribe. (Unattested.)
  - Pshicacuo – spoken by the western neighbors of the Tucuco tribe. (Unattested.)
  - Mishorca – spoken at the sources of the Tucuco River by the neighbors of the Pariri tribe. (Unattested.)
  - Yapreria / Sabril – spoken at the sources of the Palmar River, Zulia. (Anonymous Madrid h.)
  - Coyaima / Tupe – extinct language once spoken on the César River, Magdalena. (Castro Trespalacios 1946, only a few patronyms.)
  - Burede – once spoken at the sources of the Socuy River, Zulia. (Unattested.)
  - Pemeno – once spoken at the mouth of the Escalante River, Zulia. (Unattested.)
  - Bubure / Bobure – once spoken in the state of Zulia around the modern cities of Bobures and Gibraltar. (Unattested.)
  - Quenagua – extinct language once spoken in Espiritu Santo Valley in the state of Zulia. (Unattested.)
  - Umaquena – once spoken on the Umaquena River, Zulia. (Unattested.)
  - Sunesua – once spoken by the southern neighbors of the Quenaga tribe in the Espiritu Santo Valley, Zulia. (Unattested.)
  - Lobatera – once spoken around the modern city of Lobatera, state of Táchira. (Unattested.)
  - Táchira – once spoken on the Táchira River, state of Táchira. (Unattested.)
  - Tapano – once spoken in the state of Mérida between Lake Onia and Lake Motilon. (Unattested.)
  - Miyuse – once spoken in the state of Mérida on the Mucujepe River and Tucani River. (Unattested.)

Pijao group

- Pijao / Pinao – once spoken on the Luisa River, Otaima River, Tuamo River, Tetuán River, Aipe River, and Magdalena River, now in the villages of Ortega, Coyaima, and Natagaima, department of Tolima, Colombia.
- Pantagora / Palenque – once spoken between the Guarinó River and San Bartolomé River, department of Calcias, Colombia. (Unattested.)
- Colima – extinct language once spoken on the right bank of the Magdalena River and on the Negro River and Pacho River, Cundinamarca department.
- Muzo – once spoken at the sources of the Carare River and in the Paima Valley, department of Cundinamarca. (only a few words.)
- Nauta – once spoken by the northern neighbors of the Muzo tribe. (Unattested.)
- Panche – extinct language once spoken on the Gualí River, Mariquita River, Guarinó River, Coello River, Villeta River, Seco River, Magdalena River, and Fusagasuga River, Cundinamarca.
- Agatá – once spoken in the department of Cundinamarca on the Magdalena River, east of the Chibcha tribe. (Unattested.)
- Amani – spoken by the western neighbors of the Pantagora tribe in the department of Caldas. (Unattested.)
- Neiva – once spoken around the modern city of Neiva in the department of Huila. (Unattested.)
- Manipo – once spoken at the mouth of the La Plata River in the same area. (Unattested.)
- Ajie – unknown language of an extinct tribe that once lived in the territory of Meta at the sources of the Tagua River and Losada River. (Unattested.)

Opone group

- Opone – extinct language once spoken on the Opone River, department of Santander, Colombia.
- Carare – spoken by a few individuals on the Carare River in the department of Santander.
- Yariguí – once spoken on the Sogamoso River and in Barranca Bermeja in the same department. (Unattested.)
- Hacaritama – once spoken around present-day Hacaritama city in the department of Santander.
- Xiriguana – extinct language of a tribe once living in the department of Santander in the Cordillera de Lebaja. (Unattested.)
- Carate – once spoken around the modern city of Ocaña, department of Norte de Santander. (Unattested.)
- Corbago – once spoken in the department of Magdalena in the Sierra de Mene. (Unattested.)
- Guane – once spoken in the department of Santander at the sources of the Tarare River. (Gumilla 1745, pt. 2, p. 40, only two words.)
- Chinato – extinct language once spoken on the upper course of the Zulia River, department of Norte de Santander, around the modern city of Cúcuta. (Unattested.)
- Zorca – once spoken in the same department in the San Cristóbal Valley (Unattested.)
- Cariquena – once spoken on the Cariquena River in the state of Táchira, Venezuela. (Unattested.)
- Capacho – once spoken around the village of Capacho in the state of Táchira, Venezuela. (Unattested.)

Carijona group

- Guaque / Huaque / Murcielaga – extinct language once spoken on the Inganos River, Caquetá territory, Colombia.
- Carijona / Kalihóna – language now spoken by a few individuals on the middle course of the Caquetá River, territory of Caquetá.
- Umáua / Hiánocoto / Máua – language spoken at the sources of the Apoporis River in the territory of Caquetá.
- Saha / Tsahatsaha – spoken in the territory of Caquetá between the Cuemani River and Yarí River. (Unattested.)
- Riama – spoken between the Yari River, Apoporis River, and Vaupés River, territories of Caquetá and Vaupés. (Unattested.)
- Mahotoyana – spoken in the territory of Vaupés on the Macaya River. (Unattested.)
- Ajajú – unknown language spoken on the Ajaju River, Amazonas territory. (Unattested.)

Patagon group

- Patagon – extinct language once spoken in the villages of Paca, Olipanche, and Bagua and around the modern city of Jaén, department of Cajamarca, Peru. (only a few words.)

Arara group

- Arára / Ajujure / Cabanaé / Opinadkóm – extinct language once spoken on the right bank of the Pacajá Grande River and on the upper course of the Anapu River, Pará, Brazil.
- Apingi / Apeiaca / Apiacá de Tocantins – language spoken between the Tocantins River and Jacunda River, state of Pará. Now spoken by only a few individuals.
- Parirí – once spoken at the sources of the Pacajá River, Jacundá River, and Arataú River, Pará, now perhaps extinct.
- Timirem / Antimilene – language of an unknown tribe that live in the virgin forests on the Agua de Saúde River, Pará. (Unattested.)
- Yuma – extinct language once spoken on the Jacaré River and Ituxi River, territory of Rondônia. (Unattested.)

Palmela group

- Palmela – extinct language once spoken at the mouth of the São Simão River in the Guaporé River, Rondônia.

Pimenteira group

- Pimenteira – Portuguese name of an extinct language the original name of which is unknown, spoken once at the sources of the Sant' Anna River and on Lake Pimenteira and between the Piauí River and Gurgueia River, state of Piauí, Brazil.

Xingú group

- Yaruma / Aruma – spoken at the sources of the Paranaíba River, state of Mato Grosso, now perhaps extinct.
- Bacairí / Bacaery – originally spoken between the Batoví River and Curisevú River, later on the Paranatinga River, now by only a few families on the Posto Simões Lopes, Mato Grosso.
- Nahukwá / Naucuá / Anáukwá – language spoken between the Curisevú River and Culuene River, with many dialects:
  - Yanumakapü / Nahukwá proper – northern dialect.
  - Etagl – spoken in the village of Etagl.
  - Kuikutl / Guicurú / Cuicuro – spoken on the Culuene River in the village of Cuicuro.
  - Kalapalo / Apalaquiri – spoken in the village of the same name on the Culuene River.
  - Matipú / Matipuhy – spoken in the village of the same name on the right bank of the Curisevú River.
  - Yamarikuná – spoken on the Curisevú River.
  - Suva / Tsúva – spoken by a few people on the right bank of the Curisevú River. (Unattested.)
  - Naravute / Naravóto – spoken on the Curisevú River.
  - Aipats – spoken on the Curisevú River; now probably extinct. (Unattested.)
  - Auwáwiti – spoken by a few people on the Curisevú River. (Unattested.)

=== Meira (2006) ===
Preliminary internal classification of the Cariban languages according to Sérgio Meira (2006):

- Cariban
  - Guianan branch
    - Karinya (Galibi); Wayana; Apalaí (?); Palmella † (?)
    - Taranoan group
      - Karihona
      - Tiriyó; Akuriyó
    - Parukotoan group
      - Katxuyana
      - Waiwai; Hixkaryana
  - Venezolano branch
    - Coastal group
    - Tamanaku †
      - Chayma †
      - Cumanagoto †
    - Pemongan group
      - Pemong (Arekuna, etc.)
      - Kapong (Akawaio, etc.)
      - Makuxi
    - Panare
    - Ye’kwana (?)
    - Mapoyo (?); Yawarana (?)
  - Waimirian branch
    - Waimiri-Atroari (?)
  - Yukpano branch
    - Yukpa (Motilón)
    - Hapreria (Japreria)
  - Southern (or Pekodian) branch
    - Bakairi
    - Xinguan group (or Kampot dialect cluster)
      - Arára
      - Ikpeng
      - Apiaká do Tocantins
      - Parirí
      - Yarumá
  - Kuikuroan branch
    - Kuikuro (Kalapalo, etc.)
    - Pimenteira † (?)

=== Gildea (2012) ===
As of Gildea (2012), there had not yet been time to fully reclassify the Cariban languages based on the new data. The list here is therefore tentative, though an improvement over the one above; the most secure branches are listed first, and only two of the extinct languages are addressed.

- Cariban
  - Parukotoan
    - Katxúyana (Shikuyana, † Warikyana)
    - Waiwai: Waiwai (Wabui, Tunayana), Hixkaryana
  - Pekodian
    - Bakairí
    - Arara: Arara (Parirí), Ikpéng (Txikão)
  - Venezuelan Carib
    - Pemóng–Panare
      - Pemóng: Kapóng (Akawaio, Patamuna, Ingarikó), Makushi, Pemón (Taurepang, Kamarakóto, Arekuna)
      - Panare
    - Mapoyo–Tamanaku
      - † Kumaná (Chaima, Cumanagota, Tamanaku)
      - Mapoyo-Yawarana (Mapoyo, Wanai, Yawarana, Pémono)
  - Nahukwa: Kuikúro, Kalapalo
  - Guianan Carib
    - Kari'nja (Carib, Kalinya, Cariña, Galibi)
    - Makiritare (De'kwana, Maiongong, Ye'kwana)
    - Taranoan
      - Tiriyo: Akuriyo, Tiriyo, Trio
      - Karihona
    - Wayana
- Unclassified:
  - Apalaí
  - Waimirí Atroarí
  - Yukpa: Yukpa, Japréria

=== Meira et al. (2015) ===
Meira, Birchall & Chousou-Polydouri (2015) give the following phylogenetic tree of Cariban, based on a computational phylogenetic analysis of 100-item Swadesh lists.

- Cariban
  - Opon-Carare
  - Yukpa
  - Nuclear Cariban
    - Sapara
    - Pekodian
      - Bakairi
      - Arara, Ikpeng
    - Kuhikugu
    - Pemongan
      - Pemon
      - Taurepang
      - Makushi
      - Patamuna; Akawaio, Arekuna
    - Wayumaran
      - Wayumara
      - Purukoto
    - Parukotoan
      - Katxuyana
      - Hixkaryana, Waiwai
    - Kumanan
      - Chayma
      - Cumanagoto
    - Tamanaku
    - Mapoyan
      - Yawarana
      - Pemono, Mapoyo
    - Panare
    - Dekwana
    - Guianan
      - Wayana, Apalai
      - Taranoan
        - Karihona
        - Tiriyo, Akuriyo
    - Karina
    - Waimiri

Meira, Birchall & Chousou-Polydouri (2015) conclude that the Proto-Cariban homeland was located north of the Amazon River, and that there is no evidence for a northward migration from the south, as previously proposed by Rodrigues (1985). Rather there were two southern migrations (Pekodian and Nahukwa into the Upper Xingu).

=== Jolkesky (2016) ===
Internal classification by Jolkesky (2016):

(† = extinct)

- Karib
  - Karib, Western †
    - Karare †
    - Opon †
  - Karib, Central
    - Apalai
    - Hianakoto
      - Guake †
      - Hianakoto-Umawa †
      - Karihona
    - Kariña
    - Palmella †
    - Tarano
      - Akurio
      - Tiriyo
    - Wayana
  - Karib, Southern
    - Kuikuro
      - Kalapalo
      - Kuikuro
      - Matipu
      - Nahukwa
    - Pekodi
      - Arara-Ikpeng
        - Arara
        - Ikpeng
      - Bakairi
    - Pimenteira †
  - Karib, Northern
    - Parukoto
      - Kashuyana
      - Parukoto, Nuclear
        - Hishkaryana
        - Sikiana
        - Waiwai
    - Purukoto
      - Kapong: Akawayo; Patamona
      - Makushi
      - Pemon: Arekuna; Ingariko; Kamarakoto; Taurepang
      - Purukoto
    - Venezuela
      - De'kwana-Wayumara
        - De'kwana
        - Wayumara
      - Eñepa
      - Kumana
        - Chayma
        - Kumanagoto †
      - Mapoyo-Yabarana
        - Mapoyo
        - Pemono
        - Yabarana
      - Tamanaku †
      - Yao †
        - Tiverikoto †
        - Yao †
    - Yawaperi-Paravilhana
      - Sapara-Paravilhana
        - Paravilhana
        - Sapara
      - Yawaperi
        - Bonari †
        - Waimiri-Atroari
    - Yukpa-Japreria
      - Japreria
      - Yukpa

== Proto-language ==
Proto-Cariban
- Reconstruction of: Cariban languages

Proto-Cariban phonology according to Gildea (2012):

Proto-Cariban consonants
	Labial	Alveolar	Palatal	Velar
Plosive	p	t		k
Nasal	m	n		
Approximant	w	r	j	

Proto-Cariban vowels
	Front	Central	Back
Close	i	ɨ	u
Mid	e	ô	o
Open		a	

Proto-Cariban reconstructions by Gildea (2007, 2012):

Proto-Cariban reconstructions by Gildea (2007, 2012)

gloss	Proto-Carib
'sun'	*titi
'moon'	*nunô
'water (n)'	*tuna
'sunlight'	*awatinɨ
'star'	*tirikô
'DESIDERATIVE'	*(CV)te
'sand'	*saka(w)
'sand'	*samutu
'body'	*jamun
'flesh, meat, body'	*punu
'meat food'	*ôtɨ
'water'	*paru
'rain'	*konopo
'person'	*karipona
'man'	*wôkɨrɨ
'husband'	*nɨjo, *mɨjo
'eye'	*ônu-ru
'ear'	*para-rɨ
'nose'	*ôwna-rɨ
'mouth'	*mɨta-rɨ
'lip'	*ôtipi-rɨ
'saliva'	*ôtaku
'tooth'	*(j)ô-rɨ
'tongue'	*nuru
'one'	*tôwinô
'two'	*atjôkô(nô/ne)
'head'	*pu-tupô
'forehead'	*pe-rɨ
'leg'	*pôre(-pɨ/pa)
'foot'	*pupu-ru
'heel'	*pu(pu)-tôpu
'sole of foot'	*pɨta
'knee'	*ôtjôkumu-ru
'neck'	*pɨmɨ-rɨ
'breast'	*manatɨ-rɨ
'chest'	*puropi-rɨ
'buttocks'	*pupɨtɨkɨ
'cheek'	*peta
'forest'	*jutu
'inside'	*tawô
'to bite'	*ôteka
'to give; to put'	*utu
'hand'	*ômija-rɨ, *amo-rɨ
'to do; to make; to put'	*(tɨ)rɨ, *(t)ɨrɨ
'to gift O (with something)'	*ekarama
'to put away'	*arama
'belly'	*wetVpu
'belly'	*(e)wenɨ
'heart (guts); chest'	*ôwanô
'liver'	*ôre
'to close (tr. v)'	*apuru
'to descend'	*wɨpɨtô
'to see'	*ône
'to hear'	*ôta
'to know (tr. v)'	*putu
'to know (postp)'	*warô
'to sleep'	*wônɨkɨ
'to sleep'	*wetu(mɨ)
'to shoot; to kill'	*(tɨ)wô, *(t)wô(nô)
'to drink'	*woku-ru
'to drink'	*ônɨrɨ
'to eat (intr. v)'	*ôt-ôku
'to eat fruit'	*ônapɨ
'to eat meat'	*(t)ônô
'to eat flour/bread'	*(t)ôku
'to eat nuts'	*aku
'to grate (manioc)'	*(tɨ)kɨ
'to bathe (O)'	*(tɨ)pɨ
'to weave'	*(tɨ)kapɨ
'to cook; to boil'	*(tɨ)jô
'to take; to pull out/away'	*(t)ôwɨ
'to throw out'	*(tɨ)papo
'to gather fruit'	*(tɨ)pôtɨ
'fire'	*wepeto
'fire'	*mapoto
'ash'	*wôreiCV
'to light fire'	*(t)urô
'to burn (intr. v)'	*jatu
'to burn (tr. v)'	*uk(w)a
'to fell tree/farm'	*(tɨ)ma
'to go'	*(wɨ-)tô(mô)
'to come'	*(w)ôtepɨ
'to come'	*(w)ômôkɨ
'to say'	*(wɨ)ka(ti)
'to be; to say'	*a(p)
'to dwell; to be'	*(w)eti
'to enter'	*(w)ômô(mi)
'REFLEXIVE'	*(w)e-
'RECIPROCAL'	*(w)ôte-
'beak'	*potɨ-rɨ
'earth'	*nono
'cloud'	*kapurutu
'rope'	*ôwa(-rɨ)
'hot'	*atu(NV)
'cold'	*atono
'cold'	*t-ɨnotɨ-me
'good'	*kure
'hard'	*akɨpɨ
'snake'	*ôkôju
'path'	*ôtema(-rɨ)
'mountain'	*(w)ɨpɨ
'older brother'	*pipi
'grandchild'	*pa-rɨ
'faeces'	*wetɨ, *watô
'to defecate'	*weka
'child'	*mure
'shoulder'	*mota-rɨ
'thigh'	*petɨ
'hair'	*(e)tipotɨ(-rɨ)
'to cut'	*akôtô
'to take; to carry'	*arô
'to seize'	*apôti
'1SG'	*ôwɨ-rô
'2SG'	*ômô-rô
'2COL'	*ôm-jamo
'1INCL'	*kɨnmô-rô
'1INCL'	*kɨwɨ-rô
'1INCL.COL'	*kɨC-jamo
'1EXCL'	*apina
'this (INAN)'	*(t)ônɨ
'this (INAN)'	*(t)ôrô
'this (ANIM)'	*môtjô
'this (ANIM COL)'	*môtj-jamo
'that (INAN)'	*mônɨ
'that (INAN)'	*môrô
'that (ANIM)'	*môkɨ-rô
'that (ANIM COL)'	*môk-jamo
'who?'	*onôkɨ
'all'	*ômerô
'grease; fat'	*katɨ
'to grow'	*atɨta, *anɨta
'thick'	*tɨpɨtɨ-ma
'AUGMENTATIVE'	*imô
'small'	*pitikô
'woman'	*wôriti
'woman'	*pɨtɨ
'fish'	*kana
'dog'	*akôrô
'dog'	*kaikuti
'louse'	*(w)ajamô
'tree'	*wewe, *jeje
'branch'	*ekata
'arm'	*apô-rɨ
'seed'	*ôpɨ(-tɨpô)
'seed'	*a-tɨpô
'seed; contents'	*a-rɨ(-rɨ)
'seed'	*ôna-tɨpô
'leaf'	*jare
'root'	*mitɨ
'bark, skin'	*pitupô
'blood'	*munu-ru
'red'	*t-a(k)pi-re
'white'	*t-a-(re)mutu-ne
'black'	*t-puru-me/ke
'night'	*koko
'nightfall (intr. v)'	*koko-mamɨ
'bone'	*j-ôtîpî-rî
'egg'	*pumo
'horn'	*retɨ-rɨ
'tail; penis'	*arokɨ
'scrotum; testicle'	*ômu(-ru)
'feather'	*apôri-rɨ
'name'	*ôtetɨ
'ant'	*iraka
'ant'	*kɨjawôko
'ant'	*juku
'ant'	*mɨkakô
'ant'	*(n)mapu(nu)
'bow'	*wɨrapa-rɨ
'deer'	*(wɨ)kapawu
'deer'	*karijakô
'grandfather'	*tamo(ko)
'heavy'	*amôti-ma/-ne
'to sit'	*erew-ta/-ma
'lightning'	*manan manan
'howler monkey'	*arimi
'monkey'	*itjo
'rib'	*awo-tɨ
'to roast'	*puru, *purô
'to run'	*ekatu(mɨ)
'shadow'	*amore-rɨ
'shadow'	*ôkatu
'short'	*tɨntɨ-tʲô
'to talk; to converse'	*ôt-uru
'spider'	*mojoti
'spider'	*tjawaraka(ru)
'to tie'	*(m)ômô
'today; now'	*amenarô
'tomorrow'	*koropo
'vagina'	*ôrɨ
'to wait'	*mômôku
'high'	*kawô
'sun'	*weju
'1SG'	*u-
'3SG'	*i-
'stone'	*tôpu
'flesh, meat, body'	*punu
'person'	*wɨtoto
'jaguar'	*kajkuti
'to bite'	*eseka
'to find'	*eporɨ
'to give; to put'	*utu
'to close (tr. v)'	*apuru
'to descend'	*ôpinô
'to pierce'	*atpo
'to shoot; to kill'	*(tɨ)wô, *(t)wô(nô)
'to eat meat'	*(t)ônô
'to grate (manioc)'	*(tɨ)kɨ
'to go'	*(wɨ-)tô(mô)
'to come'	*(w)ôtepɨ
'to enter'	*(w)ômô(mi)

== See also ==
- List of Spanish words of Indigenous American Indian origin
- Arawak peoples
- Arawakan languages
- Carib language
- Taíno language
- Garifuna language
