= Pémono language =

Extinct Cariban language

Pémono
- pémono
- Native to: Venezuela
- Extinct: after 2000, with the death of Juanita García
- Language family: Cariban: Central; Mapoyo; Pémono

Language codes
- ISO 639-3: pev
- Glottolog: pemo1245
- Pémono is classified as Critically Endangered by the UNESCO Atlas of the World's Languages in Danger

Pémono (Pémono: pémono) is an extinct Cariban language or dialect of Mapoyo language that was spoken by only an eighty-year-old woman, Juanita García, when first identified in 1998 in Venezuela. The ethnic population now speaks Spanish. It became extinct some time after that.

== History ==
In 1998, researcher Marie-Claude Mattéi-Müller identified a linguistic variety very similar to Mapoyo which was spoken upriver from San Juan de Manapiare by Juanita García, who was estimated to be around 80 years old at the time. She had lived with the Yawarana for some time, though still remembered well the language of her parents, which she called pémono, a term with unknown origins. This language was known to the oldest of the Yawarana, who could describe a number of linguistic traits of it. The collected data for Pemono affirm that it is a variety of Mapoyo, and constitutes a sort of link between Mapoyo and Yawarana.

== Geographical distribution ==
The last speaker of Pemono, Juanita García, lived in a Yawarana rancherío along the Majagua River.

== Classification ==
Pemono is closely related to Mapoyo, and has been described as a variety of it. Traditionally, Mapoyo was included in the Venezuelan branch of Cariban. Terrence Kaufman's outdated (1994) classification classifies Mapoyo and Yawarana (as a singular language) in his Central branch of Cariban, along with Yeꞌkuana, Apalaí, and Wayana, and the extinct Cumanagoto and closely related Chaima. However, Tania Granadillo (2019) disputes the inclusion of Mapoyo in the Venezuelan branch, claiming that it does not share certain linguistic features with the other languages classified as Venezuelan Cariban.

== Phonology ==
Pemono has an identical phonology to Mapoyo:

	Labial	Alveolar	Palatal	Velar	Glottal
Stop	p	t		k	ʔ
Nasal	m	n	ɲ		
Fricative		s			h
Rhotic		ɾ			
Approximant	w		j		

	Front	Central	Back
High	i	ɨ	u
Mid	e	ɘ	o
Low		a	
