= Yabarana language =

Nearly extinct Cariban language

Yabarana
- Yawarana
- Native to: Venezuela
- Region: Manapiare River basin, Amazonas
- Ethnicity: 292 Yabarana (2001)
- Native speakers: 151 (2012)
- Language family: Cariban: Venezuelan; Mapoyo-Tamanaku; Mapoyo–Yabarana; Yabarana
- Dialects: Curasicana; Wökiare

Language codes
- ISO 639-3: yar
- Glottolog: yaba1248
- Linguasphere: 80-AEA-b

- Yawarana is classified as Severely Endangered by the UNESCO Atlas of the World's Languages in Danger.

Yabarana is a moribund Cariban language or dialect of Mapoyo, spoken in Venezuela.

== Classification ==
Yawarana is a member of the Cariban language family. Their first mention as such was in 1782 by the Jesuit Filippo Salvatore Gilii, who obtained the information from the Tamanaku. Girard (1971) grouped Yawarana with Mapoyo in his eighth subgroup out of 15 which he had devised for the Cariban family. However, he doubted the close classification of Yawarana with Mapoyo, instead suspecting a close relationship with Pemon. The two are placed in Marshall Durbin's (1977) classification, which is, however, rejected by modern scholarship, with the Panare language, separating them from Tamanaku. A comparative study on Tamanaku in 1990 by Mattei Muller and Henley (1990) found much lexical similarity between Mapoyo, Yawarana, and Tamanaku, but much fewer for Panare and Cumanagoto. Terrence Kaufman's (1994) classification, also outdated, grouped Mapoyo-Yawarana in his Central branch with Yeꞌkuana, Apalaí, and Wayana, also adding Cumanagoto and closely related Chaima. He also described Tamanaku as a synonym of Mapoyo-Yawarana. A "link" between Mapoyo and Yawarana, Pémono, was identified in 1998 by Mattei Muller, and at the time was spoken by only one woman; she died soon after.

== History ==
=== Documentation ===
Until the 1990s, both Mapoyo and Yawarana were known solely from wordlists, phonological descriptions, and descriptions of specific aspects of grammar.

== Status ==
As of 2012, Yawarana was spoken by 151 people, and was seriously endangered at the time.

== Phonology ==
=== Consonants ===
Yawarana has the following consonants:

| | Bilabial | Alveolar | Palatal | Velar | Labiovelar | Glottal |
|---|---|---|---|---|---|---|
| Stop | p | t | | k | | |
| Fricative | | s | | | | h |
| Nasal | m | n | ɲ | | | |
| Rhotic | | ɾ | | | | |
| Approximant | | | j | | w | |

=== Vowels ===
The vocalic system of Yawarana is identical to that of Mapoyo and Pémono:

| | Front | Central | Back |
|---|---|---|---|
| High | i | ɨ | u |
| Mid | e | ɘ | o |
| Low | | a | |
