= Sikiana language =

Carib language

Sikiana
- Kaxuiâna (Katxúyana)
- Native to: Brazil, Suriname, Venezuela
- Ethnicity: Sikiana, Kashuyana
- Native speakers: <12 (2012)
- Language family: Cariban: Parukotoan; Sikiana
- Dialects: Sikiana; Warikyana †

Language codes
- ISO 639-3: Either: sik – Shikuyana (Sikiana) kbb – Kaxuiâna
- Glottolog: kaxu1237 Kaxuiâna
- ELP: Katxúyana; Shikuyana
- Linguasphere: 80-AHB-a
- 80-AHB-b
- Sikïiyana is classified as Critically Endangered by the UNESCO Atlas of the World's Languages in Danger

- Katxuyana-Xikuyána is classified as Vulnerable by the UNESCO Atlas of the World's Languages in Danger

Sikiana, Warikyana, or Kashuyana (also called Chikena, Chiquena, Chiquiana, Shikiana, Sikiâna, Sikïiyana, Xikiyana, Xikujana,), is a Cariban language spoken by about 12 people in Suriname.

== Name ==
The name Warikyana refers to Cariban-speaking groups living on the Trombetas River (Kahuwini 'sky-water' in Arawak). The "most influential" group of the Warikyana are the Kashuyana, residing on the Cachorro River. Other local groups in the region, who are either extinct or "integrated" with the Kashuyana, include the Kahyana, Kahuyana, Yaskuriyana, and Ingarüne. The Kashuyana call themselves Purehno. The Pawiyana, also called Pauxi or Pawitxi, speak a "related variety" of Warikyana.

== History ==
Between the 17th and 18th centuries, the Kashuyana intermarried with the (W)arikyana who had migrated from the lower Amazon. Following this, the group splintered into a number of subgroups; the most prominent of these were the Warikyana (Yaskuriyana) who did not intermarry with the Kashuyana, the Kahuyana (Kahyana), the Ingarüne, and the Pawiyana (Pawixi). During the 18th century, the Warikyana were decimated by disease, and a number of moçambeiros, escaped Black slaves, married into various groups, though "especially" within the Warikyana. In the later 18th century, many of the Pawiyana were massacred in a revolt at a Portuguese fort at the mouth of the Trombetas; the survivors moved up the Erepecuru River.

In the early 19th century, there were 2,000 speakers of Warikyana along the mid- to upper Trombetas River and its tributaries. Around this time, the Warikyana-speaking groups began to merge with one another. A century later, they had been reduced to only 1,000, as a redult of disease and internal conflict. Between 1920 and 1950, the Kashuyana and Warikyana, Kahuyana and Kahyana, Ingarüne, and Pawiyana were the remaining groups. By 1925, about 500 Kashuyana remained. In the 1930s, most of them were killed off by epidemics introduced by traders. In the mid-1940s, roughly 80 of them remained. In 1949, the Kahyana died out due to internal conflict. "Right after" 1950, the Kashuyana merged with the Warikyana. Sometime before 1960, an epidemic of malaria and yellow fever killed all but two people of the Warikyana village. The Ingarüne integrated with the Tiriyo, moving near them in 1953, and most of them moved in 1960 to the Tiriyo village on the upper Paru de Oeste River, though a few uncontacted Ingarüne were thought to remain at the headwaters of the Trombetas near the border with Guyana. About 80 people spoke Kashuyana in 1958; they had been reduced to 60 in 1965. A few survivors of the all-but-extinct Kahuyana joined the Kashuyana by 1965. All but the Pawiyana and Kashuyana were extinct by 1968. That year, the Kashuyana moved to the upper Paru de Oeste, near the Tiriyo, and intermarried with them. As of 1985, the Pawiyana were in intermittent contact with outside people, and the Kashuyana were in a "stable" state of bilingualism with Tiriyó. The Sikiana people are "relative late-comers" to the Tiriyo village of Kwamalasamutu and have switched entirely to Tiriyó, and only around 12 people spoke the language in 2012.
