= Pariri language =

Pariri may be:

- a variety of Pará Arára language, a Cariban language of Pará, Brazil
- a variety of Yukpa language, a Cariban language, spoken in Zulia State in Venezuela and across the border in Colombia
