= Pijao language =

Extinct language of Colombia

Pijao
- Pinao
- Native to: Colombia
- Region: Tolima
- Ethnicity: Pijao people
- Extinct: 1950s
- Language family: unclassified (Cariban?)

Language codes
- ISO 639-3: pij
- Glottolog: pija1235
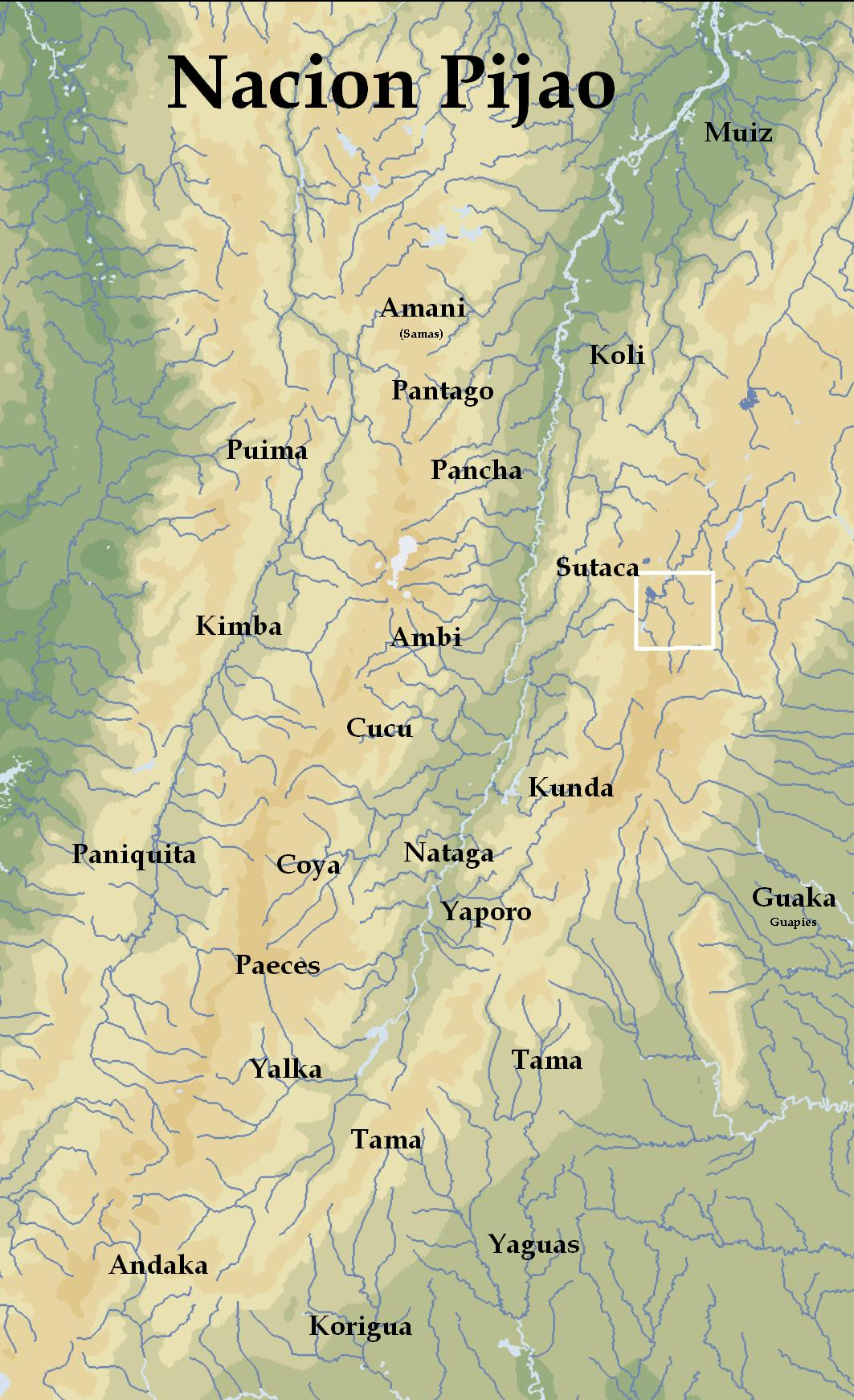
- Map of the Pijao people and language

- Pijao is classified as Extinct by the UNESCO Atlas of the World's Languages in Danger.

Pijao (Piajao, originally Pinao) is an unclassified indigenous American language that was spoken in the villages of Ortega, Coyaima (Koyai, Tupe) and Natagaima in the Magdalena River Valley of Colombia until the 1950s, by the Pijao and Panche people.

== Subdivisions ==
Pijao subtribes reported by Rivet (1943, 1944) and cited in Mason (1950):

Aype, Paloma, Ambeina, Amoya, Tumbo, Coyaima, Poina (Yaporoge), Mayto (Maito, Marto), Mola, Atayma (Otaima), Tuamo, Bulira, Ocaima, Behuni (Beuni, Biuni), Ombecho, Anaitoma, Totumo, Natagaima, Pana (Pamao), Guarro, Hamay, Zeraco, Lucira, and Tonuro.

== Classification ==
A small vocabulary list was collected in 1943; only 30 Pijao words and expressions are known.

The few words which resemble Carib are thought to be loans; toponyms in Pijao country are also Carib. Durbin & Seijas (1973) did not detect significant connections between Pijao and other unclassified languages of the area: Colima, Muzo, Pantágora, and Panche, but these are even more poorly attested than Pijao.

Jolkesky (2016) also notes that there are lexical similarities with the Witoto-Okaina languages.

== Vocabulary ==
Pijao	gloss	Pijao	gloss	Pijao	gloss	Pijao	gloss	Pijao	gloss
amé	tree	alamán	crocodile	nuhúgi	woman	golúpa	cassava	orái	red
homéro	bow	tínki	tooth	oréma	man	lún	eye	toléma	snake
sumén	to drink	tána	water	yaguáde	jaguar	oléma	ear	huíl	sun
čaguála	canoe	nasés	house	núna	moon	pegil	foot	tenú	tobacco
kahírre	dog	hoté	star	ñáma	hand	tápe	stone		
