= Motilón language =

Motilón language may refer to the following languages:

- Yukpa language
- Barí language
