= Yarumá language =

Extinct Cariban language

Yarumá
- Native to: Brazil
- Region: Xingu Indigenous Park, Mato Grosso
- Extinct: after 1936
- Language family: Cariban: Pekodian; Kampot; Yarumá

Language codes
- ISO 639-3: None (mis)
- Glottolog: yaru1255
- Linguasphere: 80-AIA-da

Yarumá is an extinct and poorly attested Cariban language. Kaufman (2007) placed it in his Arara branch, as does Gildea (1998).

According to Carvalho (2020), Yarumá forms part of the Kampot dialect cluster along with Ikpeng, Apiaká do Tocantins, Parirí, and Arára.
