= Pekodian languages =

Language group

Pekodian
- Geographic distribution: Mato Grosso and Pará, Brazil
- Linguistic classification: Cariban: Pekodian
- Subdivisions: Bakairi; Ikpeng; Pará Arára; Yarumá–Apiaká of Tocantins †

Language codes
- Glottolog: peko1235

The Pekodian languages are a subgroup of the Cariban language family. The languages are spoken in Mato Grosso and Pará states of Brazil and make up the southernmost branch of Cariban.

Meira and Chousou-Polydouri (2015) consider Pekodian to have descended from Cariban migrations that came from the north, as Cariban linguistic diversity is concentrated in northern South America.

The term Pekodian was coined in 2005 by Sérgio Meira and Bruna Franchetto on the basis of a cognate word for ‘woman’ found in these languages, respectively Bakairi pekodo and Ikpeng petkom, but not found in any of the other Cariban languages compared against them.

== Languages ==
The Pekodian languages are:

- Bakairi
- Ikpeng
- Pará Arára
- Yarumá (Suyá)
- Kuikúro (Kuikuro–Kalapalo, Matipuhy)

== Internal classification ==
Carvalho classifies the Pekodian languages as follows.

- Pekodian
  - Bakairí
  - Kampot dialect cluster
    - Ikpeng
    - Arára
    - Apiaká do Tocantins
    - Parirí
    - Yarumá

The term Kampot is coined by Carvalho (2020) from the lexical innovation *kampot ‘fire’ defining the dialect cluster.

== Sound changes ==
A number of sound changes are shared between Bakairí and Ikpeng:

- In intervocalic position, Proto-Cariban *p becomes w, *t becomes d (further developing to r in Ikpeng), and *k becomes g.
- Proto-Cariban *r becomes l in certain (as-yet undetermined) shared environments.
- Proto-Cariban *w becomes p word-initially (though there are some exceptions in Ikpeng).
- Proto-Cariban *t palatalizes to tʃ before e and i. (Bakairí further develops tʃ to ʃ, ʒ, s, or z.)
- Possibly, the Proto-Cariban sequence *nu-ru reduced to *n-ru, yielding Bakairí nu and Ikpeng ŋ-ru, although these results can also be explained in other ways.

== Loanwords ==
Pekodian languages have various loanwords from non-Cariban languages, including Juruna and Arawakan languages.

Pekodian may have also influenced Bororoan and other non-Cariban language families.
