= Jawaperi language =

Jawaperi, Yauaperi or Jauaperi may refer to the following languages:

- Ninam language
- Waimiri-Atroarí language
