= Juma language (Carib) =

Extinct Carib language

Juma
- Yúma
- (unattested)
- Native to: Brazil
- Region: Rondônia
- Ethnicity: Juma
- Extinct: (date missing)
- Language family: Cariban: Arara?; Juma

Language codes
- ISO 639-3: None (mis)
- Linguist List: qc3
- Glottolog: None
- Linguasphere: 80-AIA-ea

Juma is an extinct and undocumented Cariban language of the Brazilian state of Rondônia. Kaufman (2007) placed it in his Arara branch. According to Loukotka, there is no documentation of this language, which he spells as Yúma. He also grouped the language with Arara and other related languages.

In the 15th century, the Juma language was spoken in the state of Rondônia in the Amazon region of the modern Brazilian political state (1419–1899). For example, the fruit known as soursop in English, which may be native to the region, is known as paw-paw. The brutal rule and conquest of the Portuguese, and the later ineffiency of the Brazilian government with its Indigenous Affairs agency (IPAMA) caused the Juma people and language to be extinct.
