= Japreria language =

Cariban language spoken in Venezuela

Japrería
- Yapreria, Motilón, Yukpa-Japrería
- Native to: Venezuela
- Ethnicity: 160 (2011)
- Native speakers: 170 (2002 census)
- Language family: Cariban: Opón–Yukpa; Yukpa–Japreria; Japrería

Language codes
- ISO 639-3: jru
- Glottolog: japr1238
- ELP: Japréria
- Linguasphere: 80-AAA-ba

Japrería (also known as Yapreria, Motilón, Sabril and Yukpa-Japrería) is a Cariban language of Venezuela. It has been frequently classified as a dialect of neighbouring Yukpa, which it is closely related to.

== Classification ==
It is debated whether or not Japreria is a dialect of Yukpa. In anthropology, the Japreria people are treated as one of the subroups of the Yukpa people. The Czech linguist Čestmír Loukotka (1968), Haydée Seijas and Marshall Durbin (1977), and Mosonyi and Mosonyi (2000), all treated Japreria as a dialect of Yukpa. However, the Ministry of Education, in a 1986 article, claimed that the Yukpa could not understand the Japreria.

== Phonology ==
Consonants
	Labial	Alveolar	Palatal	Dorsal	Glottal
Nasal	m	n			
Stop/Affricate	p	t	t͡ʃ	k	ʔ
Fricative		s	ʃ		h
Liquid	ʋ	ɾ	j	ʀ	

- /ʋ/ is labiodental, while /m, p/ are bilabial.

Vowels
	Front	Central	Back
Close	i		u
Open	e	a	o

- [ɨ] and [u] are allophones of /u/.
- /a/, realized as central [ä], has a front allophone [a].
