= Aparai =

Aparai or Apalai may refer to:

- Aparai people, an ethnic group of Brazil
- Apalaí language, a language of Brazil
- Aparai, Lithuania, a place in Molėtai District Municipality, Lithuania
