= Yao language (Trinidad) =

Extinct Cariban language of South America

Yao
- Jaoi
- Yebarana
- Native to: Trinidad, French Guiana
- Ethnicity: Yao
- Era: 17th century
- Language family: Cariban: Venezuelan Carib; (unclassified); Yao

Language codes
- ISO 639-3: None (mis)
- Glottolog: yaoa1239
- Linguasphere: 80-AEC-ba
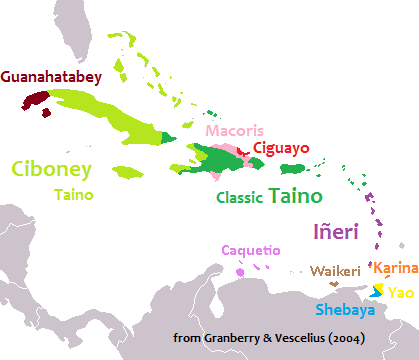
- Yao

Yao (Jaoi, Yaoi, Yaio, Anacaioury) was a Cariban language that was spoken in Trinidad and French Guiana up until its extinction in the 17th century. The language was attested in a single 1640 word list recorded by Joannes de Laet. It is thought that the Yao people migrated from the Orinoco to the islands perhaps a century earlier, after the Kaliña. The name Anacaioury is that of a number of chiefs encountered over a century or so.

== Classification ==
Yao is too poorly attested to classify within Cariban with any confidence, though Terrence Kaufman links it to the extinct Tiverikoto.

== Vocabulary ==
A few of the attested words are: nonna or noene 'moon', weyo 'sun', capou 'light', chirika 'star', pepeïte 'wind', kenape 'rain', soye 'earth', parona 'sea', ouapoto 'fire', aroua 'jaguar', pero 'dog' (from Spanish).
