= Curisevo River =

Location
- Country: Brazil

Physical characteristics
- Source
  - location: Mato Grosso state
- Mouth
  - coordinates: 12°14′S 53°18′W

The Curisevo River (or Curiseú River) is a river of Mato Grosso state in western Brazil. It flows through the Xingu Indigenous Park. Loukotka (1968) reports the Ikpeng language (Txikão) as spoken along the river.

== See also ==
- List of rivers of Mato Grosso
