= Tiverigoto language =

Extinct Cariban language of Venezuela

Tiverigoto
- Tivericoto, Tiverighotto
- Native to: Venezuela
- Region: Monagas
- Extinct: (date missing)
- Language family: Cariban: Guiana Carib; Wayana–Tiverigoto; Tiverigoto

Language codes
- ISO 639-3: None (mis)
- Glottolog: tive1236
- Linguasphere: 80-AEC-aa

Tiverigoto (Tivericoto, Tiverighotto) is an extinct and poorly attested Cariban language.

Robert Hermann Schomburgk described the Tiverigoto and their language as follows:

The Tiverighotto or Tapirighotto, a tribe of Indians who inhabit the western tributaries of the Upper Essequibo between the equator and the second degree of north latitude. I met some individuals of that nation in 1837. They resemble the Woyawais in appearance, but according to the vocabulary which M. Van Heuvell gives of this nation, and which he collected from an individual of that tribe in Demerara, there is no further resemblance between the two languages than that they both contain some words of the Caribi-Tamanakan section.

== Classification ==
Terrence Kaufman placed it with Yao in his Yao group, but his classification is outdated. Today, it is grouped with Wayana in the Guiana Carib branch.

== Vocabulary ==
Tiverighotto vocabulary
English	Tiverighotto
head	oputpa
eye	oneama
mouth	opota
foot	upti
sun	weh
moon	niamo
star	seriko
fire	apoto
water	tuna
