= Palmela language =

Extinct Cariban language

Palmela
- Native to: Brazil
- Region: Rondônia
- Extinct: by 1954
- Language family: Cariban: (unclassified); Palmela

Language codes
- ISO 639-3: None (mis)
- Glottolog: palm1241
- Linguasphere: 80-AJA-aa

Palmela (Palmella) is an extinct and poorly attested Cariban language. By 1954, only one elderly man, Andre Paix, could remember a few words of his language. According to Terrence Kaufman (2007), Palmela was phonologically divergent from other Cariban languages.
