= Bonari language =

Extinct Cariban language

Bonari
- Native to: Brazil
- Region: Amazonas
- Extinct: 1870s
- Language family: Cariban: Atruahí–Bonari; Bonari

Language codes
- ISO 639-3: None (mis)
- Glottolog: bona1255
- Linguasphere: 80-AFC-aa

Bonari is an extinct and poorly attested Cariban language, extinct since the 1870s. It is closely related to Waimiri-Atroarí (Yawaperí). It is known only from a short wordlist published in 1874. By that time, only one Bonari woman remained, who resided in Silves.
