= Pimenteira language =

Extinct Cariban language

Pimenteira
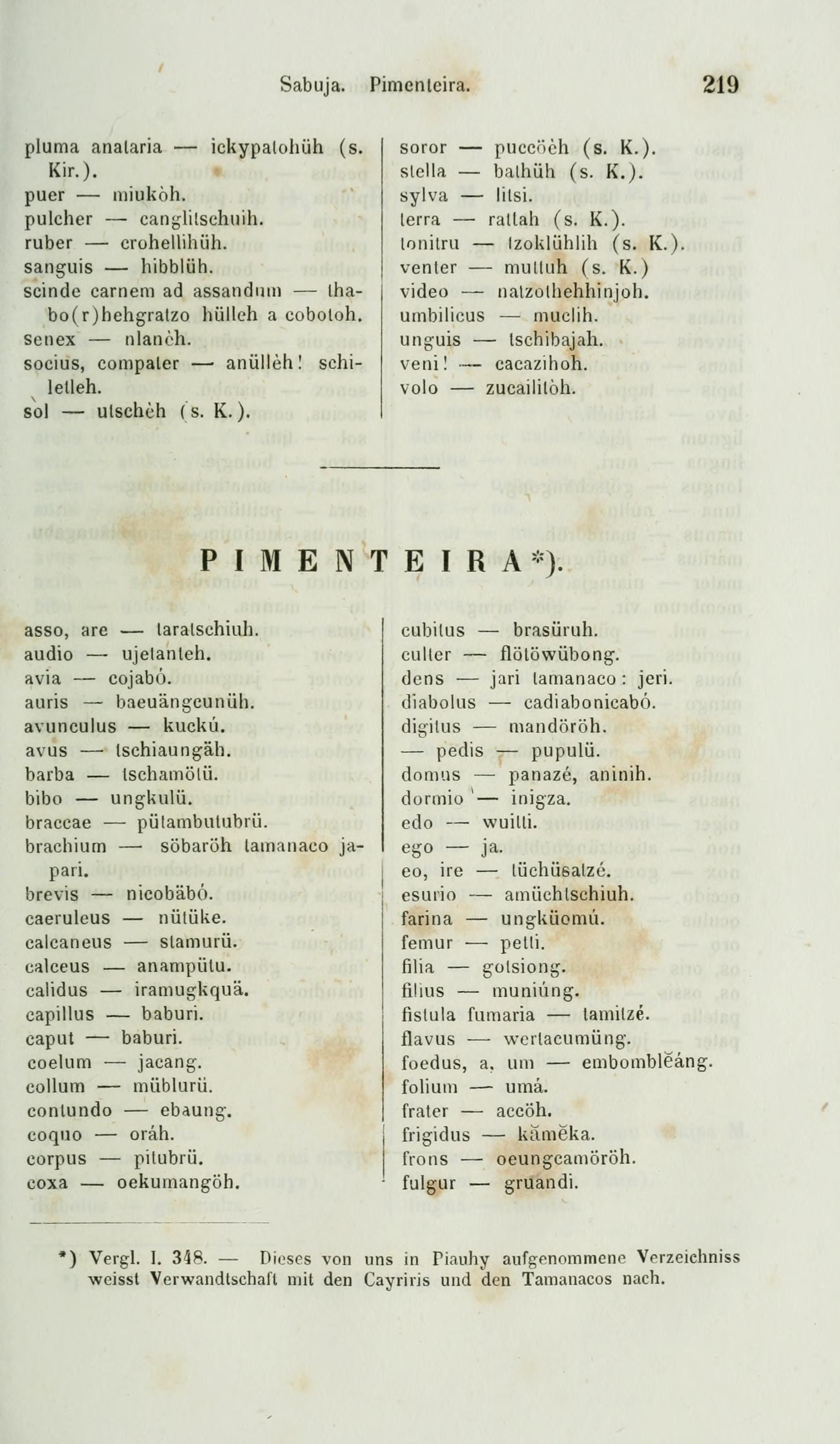
- Native to: Brazil
- Region: Piauí
- Extinct: c. 1827
- Language family: Cariban: Pimenteira–Kuikuroan; Pimenteira

Language codes
- ISO 639-3: None (mis)
- Glottolog: pime1237
- Linguasphere: 80-AKA-aa
- Map of the Pimenteira language

Pimenteira is an extinct and poorly attested Cariban language, formerly spoken in Piauí, Brazil, and later near Cabrobó. The name 'Pimenteira' is a Portuguese name attributed to the language, and the original name is unknown. It is attested in a wordlist recorded by Carl Friedrich Philipp von Martius and published in 1863.
