= Parukotoan languages =

Language group

Parukotoan
- Geographic distribution: Brazil, Suriname, and Guyana
- Linguistic classification: Cariban: Parukotoan
- Subdivisions: Waiwai; Hixkaryana; Sikiana

Language codes
- Glottolog: paru1239

The Parukotoan languages are a subgroup of the Cariban language family. The languages are spoken in Brazil, Suriname, and Guyana.

== Languages ==
The Parukotoan languages are:

- Waiwai
- Sikiana (Katuxyana), Hixkaryana
