= Pará Arára language =

Cariban language spoken in Brazil

Arára
- Pará Arára, Cabanaé, Ajujure
- Ugoroŋmo worondu
- Pronunciation: [ugɔɾɔŋˈmɔ]
- Native to: Brazil
- Region: Pará
- Ethnicity: Arara people
- Native speakers: 340 (2010)
- Language family: Cariban: Pekodian; Arara; Arára
- Dialects: Three different groups/dialects

Language codes
- ISO 639-3: aap
- Glottolog: para1310
- Linguasphere: 80-AIA-a
- Arara do Pará is classified as Vulnerable by the UNESCO Atlas of the World's Languages in Danger.

Arára (Cabanaé, Ajujure, Pará Arára: Ugoroŋmo worondu) is a Cariban language of Pará, Brazil. It is spoken by the Arara and perhaps other related groups. Arára forms part of the Kampot dialect cluster along with Ikpeng, Apiaká of Tocantins, Parirí, and Yarumá.

== Geographical distribution ==
The language is spoken by a people which includes groups that are still uncontacted. They live mainly in three villages: Cachoeira Seca, Laranjal and Maia. However, the natives of the latter have switched to Portuguese, while 85 speakers still remain in Cachoeira Seca and 250 in Laranjal.

== Phonology ==
=== Consonants ===
		Bilabial	Alveolar	Palatal	Guttural
Nasal		m	n		ŋ
Stop/ Affricate	voiceless	p	t	tʃ	k
Stop/ Affricate	voiced	b	d		ɡ
Continuant	vibrant	(ʙ̥)	ɾ		
Continuant	plain	w	l	j	(h)

Two of the sixteen consonants, /ʙ̥, h/ occur infrequently. /ʙ̥/ only occurs in expressive words, or before the vowel /u/. /h/ only occurs after a coronal consonant, like /a/ or /u/. There is also a specially rare occurrence of two implosive consonants, /ɓ/ and /ɗ/.

=== Vowels ===
	Front	Central	Back	
High	i		ɯ	u
Mid	ɛ		ɔ	
Low		a		

== Animal talk ==
Linguist Isaac Costa de Souza studied the language and concluded some words were modified when used to talk to different animals. The table below shows some modified words used when speaking to a capuchin monkey.

Normal word	Capuchin word	English gloss
ɔɛt	ɔɛgɛt	rubber tree
aɛ	aɛge	wasp
ikpa	ikpaga	mud
kuɾi	kuligi	bead
kɔk	kɔgɔk	night, evening
nu	nugu	tumour, abscess
paɾu	palugu	water

Different modifications are used according to the species of animal being addressed. The word ikpa, for example, might be modified as tɔkpa when addressing a dog, or as ĩkpã when addressing a howler monkey. Specific modifications may be used when talking to woodpeckers, tortoises, and coatis, among other animals.
