= Arakajú language =

Extinct Cariban language

Arakajú
- Aracajú
- Native to: Brazil
- Region: Pará
- Extinct: after 1820
- Language family: Cariban: Wayana?; Arakajú

Language codes
- ISO 639-3: None (mis)
- Glottolog: arac1235

Arakajú (Aracajú, Araquajú) is an extinct and poorly attested Cariban language. Kaufman (2007) placed it in his Wayana branch. The Arakajú were incorporated into the Aparai people.
