= Wayumará language =

Extinct Cariban language

Wayumara
- Waiyamara, Azumara
- Native to: Brazil
- Region: Roraima
- Ethnicity: Wayumara
- Extinct: after 1916
- Language family: Cariban: Guianan; Makiritare; Wayumara

Language codes
- ISO 639-3: None (mis)
- Glottolog: wayu1242
- Linguasphere: 80-AEB-ba

Wayumara (Waiyamara, Azumara) is an extinct and poorly attested Cariban language. Kaufman (2007) placed it in his Makiritare branch as a close relative of Ye'kuana, but his classification is outdated. Glottolog groups the language in the Guianan Carib branch, following Girard (1971), in a subgroup with Ye'kuana.

By 1916, two men of the Wayumara had forgotten everything about their previous identity save for their language.

Robert Hermann Schomburgk described the Wayumara and their language as follows:

The Waiyamaras inhabit the banks of the rivers Parima and Kaiyawana or Mocajahi. From what I could learn, their number may amount to three or four hundred. The third parallel of north latitude, and sixty-third degree of west longitude, will point out the principal settlements of their horde. Though their language bears affinities to the Caribisis and Macusis, yet it differs widely on the whole, and their idiom abounds in the sonant g'h, and the labial ph.
