= Hixkaryana language =

Carib language spoken in Brazil

Hixkaryána
- Native to: Brazil
- Region: Upper Nhamundá River, Amazonas
- Ethnicity: 1,242 Hixkaryana (2012)
- Native speakers: 600 (2012)
- Language family: Carib: Parukotoan; Waiwai; Hixkaryána

Language codes
- ISO 639-3: hix
- Glottolog: hixk1239
- ELP: Hixkaryana
- Linguasphere: 80-AHB-cc
- 80-AHB-cd
- 80-AHB-ce
- 80-AHB-cf
- 80-AHB-cg
- 80-AHB-ch
- 80-AHB-ci
- 80-AHB-cj
- Hixkaryána is classified as Vulnerable by the UNESCO Atlas of the World's Languages in Danger

Hixkaryana (/ˌhɪʃkæriˈɑːnə/ HISH-karr-ee-AH-nə) is a Cariban language spoken by 600 people on the Nhamundá River, a tributary of the Amazon River in Brazil. It is one of 17 languages that have object–verb–subject word order, initially described by linguist Desmond C. Derbyshire.

== History ==
The Hixkaryana are first recorded under the name "Babui" or "Wabuí" in 1725. A wordlist appearing under this name published in 1947 is essentially identical with modern Hixkaryana. The name "Hixkaryana" was originally the name of one of their clans. Čestmír Loukotka (1968) lists both "Hishcariana" and "Uaiboí" in his "Waiwai group" in the Cariban languages.

== Phonology ==
=== Consonants ===
Hixkaryana consonants
		Labial	Alveolar	Palatal (-alveolar)	Velar	Glottal
Nasal		m	n	ɲ ⟨ny⟩		
Plosive	voiceless	p	t	tʃ ⟨tx⟩	k	
Plosive	voiced	b	d	ɟ ⟨dy⟩		
Fricative		ɸ ⟨f⟩	s	ʃ ⟨x⟩		h
Tap			ɾ	𝼈 ⟨ry⟩		
Approximant				j ⟨y⟩	w	

/𝼈/ is a retroflex tap with a lateral release. Before the close vowel /e/, only /𝼈/ may occur, but in other environments it is contrastive with /ɾ/.

=== Vowels ===
	Front	Back
Close		ɯ ⟨ɨ⟩, u ⟨u⟩
Close-mid	e ⟨e⟩	
Open-mid		ɔ ⟨o⟩
Open	æ ⟨a⟩	

/e/ has a number of allophones in certain environments; it is realized as closer [i] after a postalveolar consonant, a long [i] with a central glide [iːᵊ] preceding a syllable with a back vowel, as close, less tense [ɪ] in unstressed syllables followed by a syllable which does not have stressed /e/, and as [e] elsewhere.

== Grammar ==
In Hixkaryana, arguments are indexed on the verb by personal prefixes, which form an inverse-like pattern in which the argument highest in the hierarchy 2nd > 1st > 3rd is indexed on the verb. If the object of a transitive verb outranks the subject, the appropriate O-prefix is used; otherwise, an A-prefix is used.

A-prefixes		O-prefixes	
1A	0-/ɨ-	1O	r(o)
2A	m(ɨ)-	2O	o(j)-/a(j)-
1+2A	t(ɨ)-	1+2O	k(ɨ)-
3A	n(ɨ)-/j-		

Intransitive verbs take prefixes mostly similar to the transitive prefixes, with an active–stative. The arguments' grammatical number is indexed on the verb by portmanteau suffixes that combine tense, aspect, mood, and number.

Hixkaryana has an object–verb–subject word order. In most cases, the person prefixes clearly indicate which arguments are the subject and object. When both the subject and the object are third person, however, the person prefix is inadequate to fully determine the identity of the arguments, requiring word order. The example below, toto yonoye kamara, cannot be given the AVO reading 'the man ate the jaguar'; the OVA reading – 'the jaguar ate the man' – is the only possible one.

toto y- ono -ye kamara
person 3SG- eat -DIST.PAST.COMPL jaguar
'The jaguar ate the man.'

Indirect objects, however, follow the subject:

bɨryekomo y- otaha -ho -no wosɨ tɨnyo wya
boy 3SG- hit -CAUS -IMM.PAST woman her-husband by
'The woman caused her husband to hit the boy.'

Moreover, the word order in non-finite embedded clauses is SOV. Like most other languages with objects preceding the verb, it is postpositional.

== Bibliography ==
- Aikhenvald, A. & Dixon, R. (Eds.) (1999). The Amazonian Languages. Oxford: Oxford University Press. ISBN 0-521-57021-2.
- Derbyshire, D. (1979). Hixkaryana. Lingua Descriptive Studies vol. 1. Amsterdam: North-Holland Publishing. ISBN 0-7099-0877-6.
