= Pauxi language =

Extinct Cariban language

Pauxi
- Pawiyana
- Native to: Brazil
- Region: Pará
- Era: attested 1900
- Language family: Cariban: Guianian; Taranoan; Tiriyoan; Pauxi

Language codes
- ISO 639-3: None (mis)
- Glottolog: paux1235
- ELP: Katxúyana
- Linguasphere: 80-AHB-bc

Pauxi (Pawixi, Pawiyana) is an extinct Cariban language of Brazil, once spoken on the right bank of the middle course of the Erepecurú River (Cuminá River) in Brazil.

== Vocabulary ==
Pauxi vocabulary
Gloss	Pauxi
sun	icire
moon	noune
star	siriké
day	oménoro
night	coco
rain	cono-on
thunder	capo
sky	topeu
water	touna
river	touna icouaca
man	tolo
woman	orice
child	moriré
brother	yacono
my husband	ouamo
my wife	iama
fish	coumata
hook	yamta
cassava	jouro
manioc flour (couac)	caïama
arrow	préou
dog	aouara
tapir	ouaou
doe	gouchaou
jaguar	caïcousso
egg	pomo
chicken	caïtara
curassow	paouïs
macaw	couyara
trahira	aïmara
yellow-spotted river turtle	chaouaro
piranha	poune
small	acatapico
large	acane
to eat	mamaou
wait for me	camaïto
make fire	miouto
to leave	machiconé
