= Yukpa people =

Indigenous people of Colombia

Yukpa
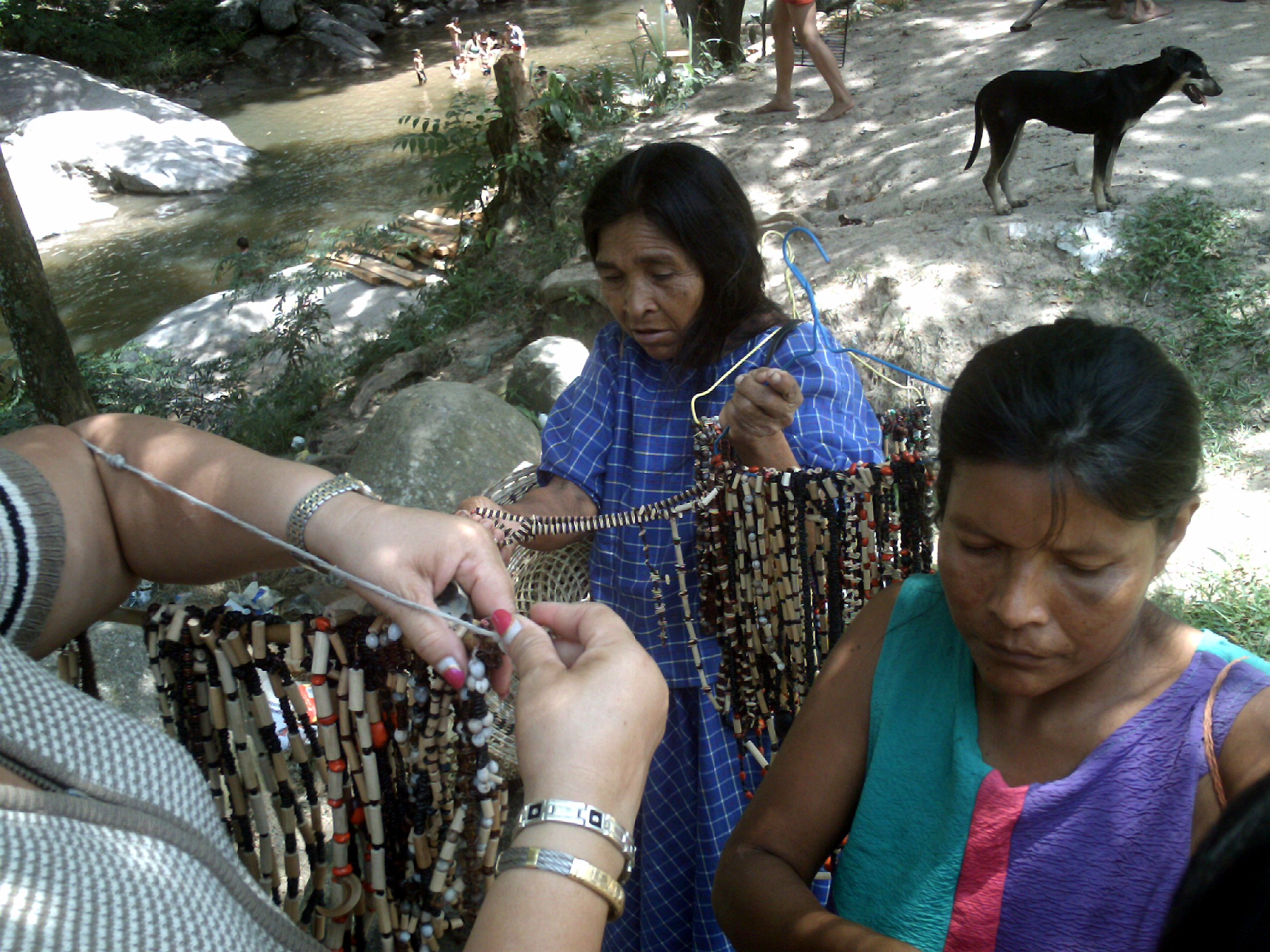
- Woman selling crafts with her daughter in a river near the Sierra de Perija

Regions with significant populations
- Venezuela 10,877; Colombia 4,761

Languages
- Spanish, Yukpa

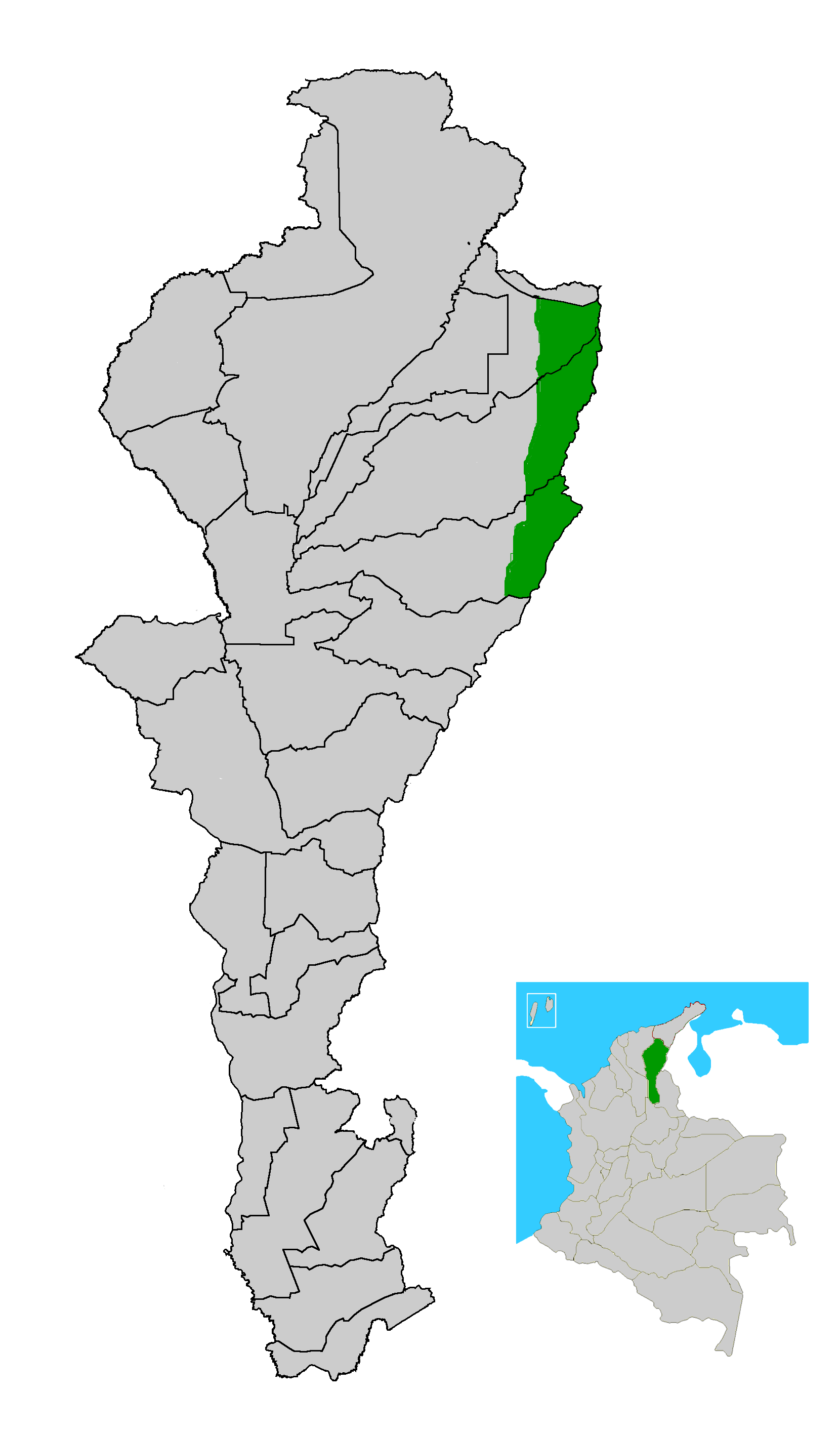
The Yukpa territory in the Cesar Department.

The Yukpa are an Indigenous ethnic group that inhabits the northeastern part of the Cesar Department in northern Colombia by the Serranía del Perijá bordering Venezuela. Their territory covers the eastern areas of the municipalities of Robles La Paz, Codazzi and Becerril in Resguardos (indian reserve) named Socorpa, Menkue, El Cozo Iroka and some other small areas in Venezuela. According to an Inter Press Service story, the majority of the Yukpa, who number nearly 10,000, live in Venezuela although some communities are still located in the mountains across the border in Colombia. The Yukpa people have been known to consume certain nest-inhabiting wasp species, such as Polistes pacificus, which make paper nests that can be quickly knocked from its hanging place on a tree directly into a fire, where the larvae are then toasted.

== See also ==
- Yukpa language
