= Colima language =

Colima may be

- Tsafiki language
- Pasto language
- an unclassified language of South America#Colima
