= Cuchivero River =

Coordinates: 7.6600°N 65.9567°W

Location
- Country: Venezuela

Cuchivero River is a river of Venezuela. It is part of the Orinoco River basin. It flows into the Orinoco River on its right bank.

== See also ==
- List of rivers of Venezuela
