= Mapoyo language =

Nearly extinct language of Venezuela

Mapoyo
- Native to: Venezuela
- Region: Amazonas
- Ethnicity: 520 Mapoyo & Yabarana (2007)
- Native speakers: 3? (2014)
- Language family: Carib: Venezuelan Carib; Mapoyo–Tamanaku; Mapoyo-Yabarana; Mapoyo

Language codes
- ISO 639-3: mcg
- Glottolog: mapo1246
- ELP: Mapoyo
- Linguasphere: 80-AEA-a

Mapoyo oral tradition and its symbolic reference points within their ancestral territory
- UNESCO Intangible Cultural Heritage
- Country: Venezuela
- Reference: 00983
- Region: Latin America and the Caribbean

Inscription history
- Inscription: 2014 (9th session)
- List: Need of Urgent Safeguarding

Mapoyo is a Carib language spoken in the state of Amazonas, Venezuela. The language is virtually extinct, with only two to three speakers reported in 2014, and the speakers' use of the language has been interfered with by Spanish, which has completely overtaken Mapoyo in the community. The oral tradition of the Mapoyo was recognized in 2014 as Intangible Cultural Heritage in Need of Urgent Safeguarding by UNESCO.

== Classification ==
The classification of Cariban languages, including Mapoyo, has been disputed. Historically, Mapoyo was included in the Venezuelan branch of Cariban. However, Tania Granadillo (2019) disputes this, claiming that it does not share certain features with the other Venezuelan Cariban languages.

== Status ==
Mapoyo is nearly extinct and had only two to three remaining speakers as of 2014. One of the speakers of the language, José Secundino Reyes (Candecho), died on 28 October 2016. The speech of the remaining speakers exhibits significant interference from Spanish, which has replaced it, and the state of Mapoyo may be described as obsolescent. In 2014, the oral tradition of the Mapoyo people was listed by UNESCO as Intangible Cultural Heritage in Need of Urgent Safeguarding.

== Phonology ==
=== Consonants ===
	Bilabial	Alveolar	Palatal	Velar	Labiovelar	Glottal
Stop	p	t		k		ʔ
Nasal	m	n	ɲ			
Rhotic		ɾ				
Fricative	β	s				h
Approximant			j		w	

/h/ is realized as palatal [ç] when preceding a voiceless plosive. /n/ is realized as a velar [ŋ] when preceding /k/. /β/ is realized as [β] between vowels only, and as a voiced stop [b] after occlusives, including nasals, and vowels. In addition, the phones [β] and [w] seem to be in free variation in two words, [ˈaɾawata]~[ˈaɾaβata] 'howler monkey' and [ˈweɾeβere]~[ˈβeɾeβere] 'fly'. /s/ has an allophone of [ts], which may found word-initially or after /ʔ/. /j/ is realized as a fricative [ʝ] before a back vowel.

=== Vowels ===
	Front	Central	Back
High	i	ɨ	u
Mid	e	ɘ	o
Low		a	

Diphthongs are attested at the phonetic level in Mapoyo, though their phonemic status could not be ascertained. The vowels /i, u/ are reduced to [ɪ, ʊ] respectively in syllable-final position. /ɘ/ is lowered to [ə] when preceding /h/, or following /β/. /a/ is realized further back as [ɑ] when occurring after an initial bilabial consonant.
