= Tamanaku language =

Extinct Cariban language of Venezuela

Tamanaku
- Tamañkú
- Native to: Venezuela
- Region: Amazonas
- Extinct: 20th century
- Language family: Cariban: Venezuelan Carib; Mapoyo–Tamanaku; Tamanaku

Language codes
- ISO 639-3: tmz
- Glottolog: tama1338

Tamanaku (Tamanaku: Tamañkú) is an extinct Cariban language of Venezuela. The language was documented beginning in the 18th century, by when it was already disappearing due to a loss of culture and European-introduced diseases.

== History ==
The earliest documentation of Tamanaku was published by Filippo Salvatore Gilij in 1780, from his 20-year stay among the Tamanku beginning around 1750. In the 18th century, The Tamanaku, along with the Maipure people, were missionized in the mid-18th century at the Mission San Luis de Gonzaga (Encamarada) to be converted to Christianity. There, they were exposed to European diseases, which, along with the erosion of their culture, resulted in the death of their language. In 1750, there were 125 Tamanaku; by 1840, the geographer Agostino Codazzi reported that only a few isolated groups remained.

== Classification ==
Tamanaku is a member of the Cariban language family. Its classification remains uncertain, as with much of the rest of the family. The online language database Glottolog groups Tamanaku within the Mapoyo-Tamanaku branch of Venezuelan Cariban languages. Gilij used Tamanaku, along with Carib and Pareca, to establish sound correspondences between each other and thus establish the Cariban language family. The 16th edition of the Ethnologue, a publication dedicated to catalogue statistics about the world's languages, describes Tamanaku as similar to Panare.

== Phonology ==
=== Consonants ===
	Bilabial	Alveolar	Palatal	Velar	Glottal
Stop	p	t		k	ʔ
Affricate			ts (dz)		
Fricative					
Nasal	m	n			
Liquid		r			
Approximant	w		j		

Voiced stops [b d ɡ] in Tamanaku, as in other Cariban languages, are not phonemic and do not contrast with their voiceless counterparts. Allophones of /p, n, r/ include [β h ɲ l]. The glottal stop is described as being possibly phonemic.

=== Vowels ===
The vowel system of Tamanaku is similar to that of other Cariban languages.

	Front	Central	Back
High	i ĩ	ɨ ɨ̃	u ũ
Mid	e ẽ	ə ə̃	o õ
Low		a ã	

== Morphology ==
Tamanaku is primarily agglutinative language with some fusional elements.
