= Maracá River =

River in Amapá, Brazil

Coordinates: 0°32′S 51°32′W

Maracá River is a river of Amapá state in Brazil. It is a tributary of the Amazon River.
