= Waimiri-Atroarí language =

Cariban language spoken in Brazil

Waimiri-Atroarí
- Yawaperí, Crichaná
- Kinja Iara
- Native to: Brazil
- Region: Amazonas, Roraima
- Ethnicity: 2,009 Waimiri-Atroari (2018, PWA)
- Native speakers: (930 cited 2001)
- Language family: Cariban: Atruahí–Boanarí; Waimiri-Atroarí
- Dialects: Atruahi; Waimirí; Jawaperi

Official status
- Official language in: Brazil (Amazonas)

Language codes
- ISO 639-3: atr
- Glottolog: waim1253
- ELP: Waimirí-Atroarí
- Linguasphere: 80-AFC-b
- Waimirí-Atroarí is classified as Vulnerable by the UNESCO Atlas of the World's Languages in Danger

Waimiri Atroari (Waimiri-Atroari: Kinja Iara 'people's language') is a Cariban language spoken by the Waimiri Atroari people. The current population is 2,009, and they have 19 villages spread along the rivers of Camanau/Curiau, Alalaii, Jauaperi, and Rio Branquinho. The language is spoken in the northern part of the State of Amazonas and the southern part of the State of Roraima. The people call themselves Kinja. The language has many other names, such as Atroahy, Atroahí, Atroarí, Atroaí, Atrowari, Atruahi, Atruahí, Ki'nya, Krishaná, Waimirí, Waimirí-atroarí, Yawaperí. The language seems to have a high transmission as it is spoken by all members of the community and is the main language used for reading and writing.

== Classification ==
Waimiri Atroari belongs to the Carib language family, which is centralized in Northern South America. The Carib languages in northern Brazil are fairly similar, while Waimiri-Atroari is rather different. Carib can be categorized into three groups: Northwest Amazon, Guiana area and Upper Xingu Basin. Waimiri Atroari seems to fall into the second group, Guiana area.

== Documentation ==
João Barbosa Rodrigues’ wordlist seems to be the first to document the language in 1885 and he refers to the people as "Crichanas". A century later, in 1985, a phonological proposal and alphabet were developed by a Catholic missionary couple from the Indigenous Missionary Council. A year after, in 1986, another missionary couple from the Evangelical Mission of the Amazonian (MEVA), created a more accurate orthography.

It seems that the first detailed description was done by Ana Carla Bruno. She released a dissertation in 2003 on the descriptive grammar of the Waimiri-Atroari language. She extensively described the phonology, morphology, lexicon, and syntax of the language. In addition, she has continued detailing the typology of Waimiri-Atroari in further works. In 2004, she published a paper on reduplication in the language. The following two years, she detailed its pronominal system (2005) and causative construction (2006). Then, in 2008 and 2009, she further analyzed the syntactic features of case-marking; phrase structure, clauses and word order. Most recently, she explored the value of linguistic analysis to better language revitalization by analyzing the syllable structure in the orthography and formal education of Waimiri-Atroari (2010).

== Phonology ==
=== Consonants ===
| | | Labial | Alveolar | Palatal | Velar | Glottal |
|---|---|---|---|---|---|---|
| Plosive/ Affricate | voiceless | p | t | t͡ʃ ⟨tx⟩ | k | ʔ |
| Plosive/ Affricate | voiced | b | d | d͡ʒ ⟨dj⟩ | | ʔ |
| Fricative | | | s | ʃ ⟨x⟩ | | h |
| Nasal | | m | n | ɲ ⟨nj⟩ | | |
| Rhotic | | | r | | | |
| Semivowel | | w | | j ⟨i⟩ | | |

=== Vowels ===
| | Front | | Central | | Back | |
| | short | long | short | long | short | long |
|---|---|---|---|---|---|---|
| Close | i | | ɨ ⟨y⟩ | ɨː ⟨yy⟩ | u | |
| Mid | e | eː ⟨ee⟩ | | | o | oː ⟨oo⟩ |
| Open | ɛ ⟨e⟩ | | a | aː ⟨aa⟩ | | |

== Morphology ==
Bruno (2003) creates a thorough documentation of the morphology of Waimiri Atroari which includes nouns of possession, relational morphemes, derivational morphemes, pronouns, non-third person pronouns and third-person pronouns. Verbs have also been documented, covering tense/aspect suffixes, mood (imperatives and negation suffix), interrogative clitic, interrogative forms, causative forms and desiderative suffix. Waimiri Atroari also has documentation of adverbs, postpositions, particles and case markings.

=== Pronouns ===
Bruno states that pronouns can take both subject and object positions in Waimiri Atroari.

==== 1st person ====
===== Subject position =====
Bruno states that kara~kra is used when responding to a question or to emphasize that the person did an action or wants something. It is also the only pronoun that can be used in the OSV order.

wasypy-pa kra w-ia
hungry-EMPH 1.PRO 1-COP
'I am hungry.'

meprypyny kara h-yn-iany.
{Tapir meat} 1.PRO 1.A-eat-TAM
'I was eating tapir meat.'

===== Object position =====
It seems that for a 1st person singular object, aa can be used (Bruno 81).

ka ram aa=ini-pia.
3.PRO 2PART 1.O-see-IMM.PAST
'He saw me.'

==== 2nd person ====
===== Subject position =====
amyry m-om-pia syna kaka
2.PRO 2.S-dive-IMM.PAST water LOC
'You dove into the water.'

===== Object position =====
It seems that the morpheme a is used to express a 2nd person singular object as in the examples (5) and (6) below.

ka ram a-wen-tah-py-pia.
3.PRO 2PART {2.O-threw up-VERBL-CAUS-IMM.PAST}
'She/he made you throw up.'

Ka ram a-ini-piya.
3.PRO 2PART 2.O-see-IMM.PAST
'He saw you.'

==== 1+2 we inclusive and 1+3 we exclusive ====
===== Subject position =====
araky ram kyky h-y-sa xiba myryka-se
Today 2PART 1+2.PRO 1+2.S-go-TAM fish {fish-in order to}
'Today we go fishing.'

a’a n-itxi-piany kaapa taka
1+3 1+3.S-go-REC.PAST garden ALL
'We went to the plantation garden.'

===== Object position =====
Irɨ k-ini-pe-s na.
3.PRO 1+2.O-see-?-DESI COP
'She/he wants to see us.'

Ka ram a’=ini-pia.
3.PRO 2PART 1+3.O-see-IMM.PAST
'She/he saw us.'

==== Anaphoric (he, she, they, it) ====
===== Subject position =====
mykyky ty-se kinj-e
3.PRO 3.REFL-foot wash-TAM
'He is washing his own foot'

mykyky ty-se kinj-e
3.PRO 3.REFL-foot wash-TAM
'He is washing his own foot'

mykyka’a ram n-yma-pa
3.PRO 2PART 3.S-fall-REM.PAST
'He fell'

Ka ram ka ini-huwa na
3.PRO 2PART 3.PRO see-NEG COP
'He does not see him'

iry n-aryma-pa te’xy n-eeni-pa
3.PRO {3.S-come back-REM.PAST} DESI 3.S-stay-REM.PAST
'He did not want to come back'

===== Object position =====
Mykyka and ka can appear in object position, but Bruno notes that ka seems to be the preferred morpheme in her data.

amyra mykyka m-ary-py-pia mykyka ini-se.
2.PRO 3.PRO 2.A-order-CAUS-IMM.PAST 3.PRO {see-in order to}
'You ordered him to see him.'

ka ram ka ini-huwa na.
3.PRO 2PART 3.PRO see-NEG COP
'He does not see him.'

==== Proximal ====
===== Subject position =====
apia hanji? aa=samka ram kanji
What this 1.POSS=hammock 2PART this
'What is this?' 'This is my hammock.'

pip-ky anjinji i-etaty
{Look for-IMP} here/this REL-name
'Look here for the names!'

byby maryba ka-tape.
3.PRO song sing-REM.FUT
'He will sing.'

By is used to describe animate objects.

bypa i-eka by karyka-e’?
Whose REL-pet this chicken-INTERR
'Whose is this chicken?'

==== Medial and Distal ====
===== Subject position =====
Myry can only be used to describe inanimate objects.

wyty ka myry
Meat EVID this
'This is meat.'

Mymo’ and mo’o are used with inanimate objects, while myky is used with animate objects.

mymo’ {marehe ram} abremyhsa
That sieve-2PART round
'That sieve is round’

myky ram tabe’a mo’o ka samka
That 2PART capybara There EVID hammock
'That is a capybara' 'There, is the hammock.'

===== Object position =====
a'a txi-piany mo'o ase mydy taka.
1+3.PRO go-REC.PAST there new house ALL
'We went there to the new village.'

=== Negation ===
Waimiri Atroari uses non-verbal negation, that is, negation marked by particles kap~kapy~kapa and wan. These particles act to indicate negation rather than negation being marked on a verb and are often used to negate existence as seen below (Bruno 115).

aiana ram wyty kapa
Sp.bird 2PART meat/food NEG
'Any-preto is not food.'

wyty wan naminja
Meat NEG dog
'Don't eat the food, dog!'

=== Causative forms ===
There are two kinds of causative forms that can be used to signify if a subject causes an event. First, there is the -py morpheme that indicates if someone “made” someone else do something or if they are not resistant to “cause” an event to happen. There is one construction where the morpheme -py appears with the lexicalized verb, such as in examples (27) and (28), where -py attaches to the verb for 'tell' (Bruno 100).

Aa Kaina h-ary-py-pia kyrywu ini-se.
1.PRO Kaina 1.S-tell-CAUS-IMM.PAST snake {see-in order to}
'I told/dictated to Kaina to see the snake.'

Paruwe aa-iry-py-pia woky yry-ky Marta inaka
Paruwe 1.O-tell-CAUS-IMM.PAST banana give-IMP Marta DAT
'Paruwe told/dictated to me to give the banana to Marta.'

There is also a form where -py does not appear with a lexicalized verb, such as in examples (29) and (30), where -py attaches to the verbs 'bleed' and 'laugh'. It also seems that intransitive verbs like these, behave like transitive verbs when they take a causative form like V[Intr+Caus [A O]] (Bruno 101).

kyka ram ka hu-myny-tah-py-pia.
1+2.PRO 2PART 3.PRO 1+2.A-bleed-VERBL-CAUS-IMM.PAST
'We made him bleed.'

Ka k-yeepitxah-py-pia.
3.PRO 1+2.O-laugh-CAUS-IMM.PAST
'She/he made us laugh.'

Second, there is a form that indicates if the subject is “letting” the event happen. Someone is ordered or permitted to do something without forcing the other or knowing if the other may fulfill the event. It seems that there is an absence of the morpheme -py, as in examples (31) and (32), and the particle tre’me is notable, however Bruno notes that the particle tre’me may not mean "let" because of example (33), in which it does not indicate "let/permit" (Bruno 103).

Aa wo'nj-e'me h-aminjaky-piany a-wenpa-typah tre'me tyruwa kapry pyky.
1.PRO clay-VAL 1.A-permit/let-REC.PAST 2.O-learn-? PART pan make how
'I permitted you to/let you dabble in the clay to learn how to make a ceramic pan.'

Aa ka m-injaky-piany wyty ipy-na tre'me.
1.PRO ka 2.O-permit/let-REC.PAST meat {look for-?} PART
'I permitted you to/let you leave to hunt.'

Aa k-aa-piany maryba taka a-iwapy-try pyky a-wenpa-typa tre'me.
1.PRO 2.O-take-REC.PAST party/song ALL 2.O-sing-? how 2.O-learn-? PART
'I took you to the party for you to learn how to sing.'

== Syntax ==
=== Split System-S ===
Waimiri Atroari is what Gildea (1998) classifies to as an Inverse Split system-S. Characteristics of this language system include A and O nominals having no case marking, a lack of auxiliaries and personal prefix set as well as the collective number suffixes. In Inverse Split System-s, also referred to as Set I systems the OV unit may either precede or follow the A, in Wamiri Atroari the order is AOV.

A Verb-Phrase may be formed with just the verb.

Ka-ky!
speak-IMPER
'Speak!'

A verb may be preceded by a Noun-Phrase.

bahinja maia kɨnk-E
Children knife break-TAM
'The children break the knife.'

The particle ram cannot separate elements of a single phrase, however it can be used as a tool to determine which element is moved within a sentence.

tahkome i-inɨ-pia ram Irikwa
elders REL-eat-IMM.PAST 2PART Irikwa
'Irika (a mythological entity) ate the elders.'

*[tahkome ram i-inɨ-pia] Irikwa
elders 2PART REL-eat-IMM.PAST Irikwa

In OSV contexts the object may move independently to subject position rather than the Verb-Phrase preceding the Noun-Phrase through the process of topicalization in which its components cannot be separated.

woky i-eki kra h-ee-ia
Banana REL-juice 1.PRO 1.A-drink-TAM
'I drink the banana juice'

=== Hierarchy ===
Hierarchical relationships exist in Waimiri Atroari in which the third person is ranked lower than the first, second and first plural inclusive and exclusive person. In situations where second person acts on first person, or first person acts on second person there is may be subject agreement or object agreement. Therefore, it is necessary that subject and object marking follow a hierarchy : 1=2, 1+2/1+3>3. The following table provided by Bruno illustrates how case is marked in Waimiri Atroari as well as the hierarchy present in the language.

Person hierarchy in Waimiri Atroari
| 1A3O | Aa ram ka h-ini-pia 1.PRO 2PART 3.PRO 1.A-see-IMM.PAST 'I saw him.' |
| 2A3O | Amɨra ram ka m-ini-pia. 2.PRO 2PART 3.PRO 2.A-see-IMM.PAST 'You saw him.' |
| 3A3O | Mɨkɨka ram ka Ø-ini-pia. 3.PRO 2PART 3.PRO Ø‍-see-IMM.PAST 'She/he saw him/her'. |
| 1+2A3O | Kɨka ram ka h-ini-pia. 1+2.PRO 2PART 3.PRO 1+2.A-see-IMM.PAST 'We saw him.' |
| 3A1O | Ka ram aa=ini-pia. 3.PRO 2PART 1.O-see-IMM.PAST 'She/he saw me.' |
| 3A2O | Ka ram a=ini-pia. 3.PRO 2PART 2.O-see-IMM.PAST 'She/he saw you.' |
| 3A1+3O | Ka ram a’=ini-pia. 3.PRO 2PART 1+3.O-see-IMM.PAST 'She/he saw us.' |
| 3A1+2O | Irɨ k-ini-pe-s na. 3.PRO 1+2.O-see-?-DESI COP 'She/he wants to see us.' |
| 1A2O | Aa ram k-ini-pia. 1.PRO 2PART 2.O-see-IMM.PAST 'I saw you' |
| 2A1O | Amɨra ram aa=ini-pia 2.PRO 2PART 1.O-see-IMM.PAST or Amra aa=k-ini-pia 2.PRO 1.O-2-see-IMM.PAST |

== Semantics ==
=== Quantification ===
==== Adverbial quantifiers ====
Noun phrases which possess quantifiers show positional variation, as seen in examples (5) to (9). Adverbials quantifiers may be positioned on either side of the head noun. Bruno (2003) explains the relative mobility of these quantifiers by categorizing them as adjuncts.

waha xiba
many fish
'many fish'

xiba waha
fish many
'many fish'

kinja wyty ipo-piany wapy
people meat look.for-REC.PAST many
'People hunted a lot.'

inja wapy wyty ipo-piany
people many meat look.for-REC.PAST
'Many people hunted.'

wapy kinja wyty ipo-piany
many people meat look.for-REC.PAST
'Many people hunted.'

==== Numeral noun phrases ====
Examples (10) to (12) provide examples of the occurrence of the numeral one. (11) is unique in the set as it refers to 'one group' while (10) and (12) refer to one individual. Example (13) demonstrates use of the number two and examples (14) and (15) provide depictions of the use of number three.

===== amini ~ awinini -awinihe -awynihe (one, alone) =====
awinihe petxi ka-ky ampa ia
one {wild pig} talk-PAST other to.
'One petxi talked to the other.'

awinih-pa ka kinja txi-pia itxi taka
alone-EMPH EVID people go-IMM.PAST jungle ALL
'The kinja went to the jungle alone.'

awynihe petxi Kwawura i-atyka-pa ty-kyda tohnaka
One pig Kwawura REL-put-REM 3.REFL-back over
'One wild pig put Kwawura on his own back.'

===== Typytyna (two, a couple, a pair) =====
typytyna karyka
two chickens
'two chickens'

===== Takynynapa (three) =====
weri samka ka-pia takynynapa
Woman hammock make-IMM.PAST three
'The woman made three hammocks.'

takynyny pahky kaminja n-apynaka.
three only non-native 3-escape
'Only the three white men escaped.'

==== Loanword influence ====
As of recently, due to western influence, Portuguese loanwords are also used to refer to amounts higher than three, and it is common for younger speakers to use them for amounts lower than three.

dois kinja xiba myry-myry-pia quatro pahky.
Two people fish REDUP-fish-IMM.PAST four only
'Two people caught only four fish.'

amy kinja dezessete apytphy
Other people seventeen behind
amy kinja dezessete nate’me
Other people seventeen behind
'Seventeen people were in front, and seventeen were behind.'

==== Many ====
However, traditionally, it is common for the Kinja people to use waha~wapy ('many, a lot') for amounts more than three because they did not count up to three.
