= Carare River =

Location
- Country: Colombia

Physical characteristics
- Mouth
  - location: Caribbean Sea

Carare River is a river of northern Colombia. It flows into the Caribbean Sea.

== See also ==
- List of rivers of Colombia
