= Mapuera River =

- Location within Brazil
- Native name: Rio Mapuera (Portuguese)

Location
- Country: Brazil

Physical characteristics
- Source
  - location: Pará
- Mouth
  - coordinates: 1.084749°S 57.062211°W
- Length: 340

Basin features
- River system: Trombetas River

The Mapuera River is a tributary of the Trombetas River in Pará state in north-central Brazil.

The river basin lies partly within the 4,245,819 hectares (10,491,650 acres) Grão-Pará Ecological Station, the largest fully protected tropical forest conservation unit on the planet.

== See also ==
- List of rivers of Pará
