= Panche language =

Extinct and unclassified language of Colombia

Panche
- Native to: Colombia
- Region: Cundinamarca Department, Tolima Department
- Ethnicity: Panche
- Extinct: (date missing)
- Language family: unclassified (Cariban?)

Language codes
- ISO 639-3: None (mis)
- Glottolog: panc1242

The Panche language is an unclassified – and possibly unclassifiable – language formerly spoken in Colombia. It may have been Cariban. According to Pedro Simón, the word panche in their own Panche language means "cruel" and "murderer".

== Vocabulary ==
Panche vocabulary
| Gloss | Panche |
|---|---|
| important personage | acaima |
| Spaniard | xua |
| Tequendama Falls | pati |
| bagre | panche |
| large fish with big mouth | patalo |
| cruel assassin | colima |
| very powerful man | xe amima |
| snow | tolima |
