= Yukpa language =

Cariban language of Venezuela and Columbia

Yukpa
- Motilón
- Yupka wonkü
- Native to: Venezuela, Colombia
- Ethnicity: Yukpa people
- Native speakers: 6,000 (2007–2009)
- Language family: Cariban: Opón–Yukpa; Yukpa–Japreria; Yukpa

Language codes
- ISO 639-3: yup
- Glottolog: yukp1241
- ELP: Yukpa
- Linguasphere: 80-AAA-a
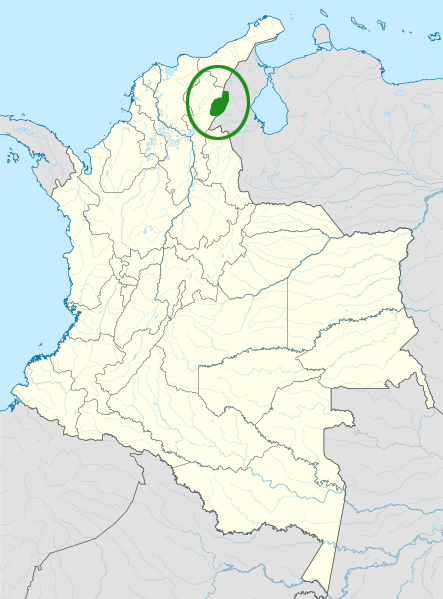
- Distribution of Yukpa

- Yukpa is classified as Vulnerable by the UNESCO Atlas of the World's Languages in Danger

Yukpa (Yuco, Yucpa, Yuko, Yupa) is a Cariban language, spoken by 3,000 people in Zulia State in Venezuela and 3,000 across the border in Colombia. It is also known as Carib Motilón, Macoíta, Northern Motilón, and Manso.

Río Casacará (Iroka) and Río Maracas are the main dialects, and different enough to possibly be considered separate languages. Also Caño Padilla–La Laguna. The Venezuelan dialects, Yrapa and Río Negro, are closer to Río Maracas than to Río Casacará.

Similarity to Japrería, the other Yupka language, is slight.

== Phonology ==
=== Consonants ===
	Labial	Dental/ Alveolar	Post- alveolar	Retroflex	Palatal	Velar	
	Labial	Dental/ Alveolar	Post- alveolar	Retroflex	Palatal	plain	lab.
Stop	p	t̪				k	kʷ
Affricate			tʃ	tʂ			
Fricative		s̪		ʂ			
Nasal	m	n̪					
Rhotic		ɾ					
Approximant	w				j		

- Labial /p, m/ are velarized as [pˠ, mˠ] in the Iroca dialect when before vowels /e, a/.
- /j/ is in free variation with [ʐ], and [ç] when before consonants.
- A retroflex [ɽ] may also occur in place of /tʂ/ or /ʂ/ in the Sokorpa dialect.
- In the La Paz and Menkwe dialects, retroflex consonants do not occur, so /ʂ/ is realized as [ʃ] in both dialects, and /tʂ/ is realized as [x] in the La Paz dialect, and [ts] in the Menkwe dialect.
- Nasals /m, n/ become voiceless [m̥, n̥] when preceding voiceless stops.

=== Vowels ===
	Front	Central	Back	
High	e ~ ɪ		ɯ	u
Mid	e ~ ɪ		o	
Low		a		

- /e/ is realized between [ɪ, e] across dialects.
