= Apiaká of Tocantins =

Extinct Cariban language

Apiaká
- Apingi, Apiaka-Tocantins
- Native to: Brazil
- Region: Tocantins
- Extinct: late 20th century
- Language family: Cariban: Pekodian; Xinguan; Paranayubic; Apiaká

Language codes
- ISO 639-3: None (mis)
- Glottolog: apia1247
- Linguasphere: 80-AIA-b

Apiaká of Tocantins, also known as Apingi, is an extinct and poorly attested Cariban language, most closely related to the extinct Yarumá language. Kaufman (2007) placed it in his Arara branch. It was said to be moribund in 1964, with only a few speakers.
