= Cumanagoto language =

Extinct Cariban language of Venezuela

Cumanagoto
- Kumana
- choto maimuru
- Native to: Venezuela
- Ethnicity: Cumanagoto people
- Native speakers: 49 (2012)
- Language family: Cariban: Venezuelan Carib; Mapoyo–Tamanaku; Cumanagoto
- Dialects: Avarigoto; Palenque; Piritugoto

Language codes
- ISO 639-3: cuo
- Glottolog: cuma1240
- Linguasphere: 83-OBB-bb
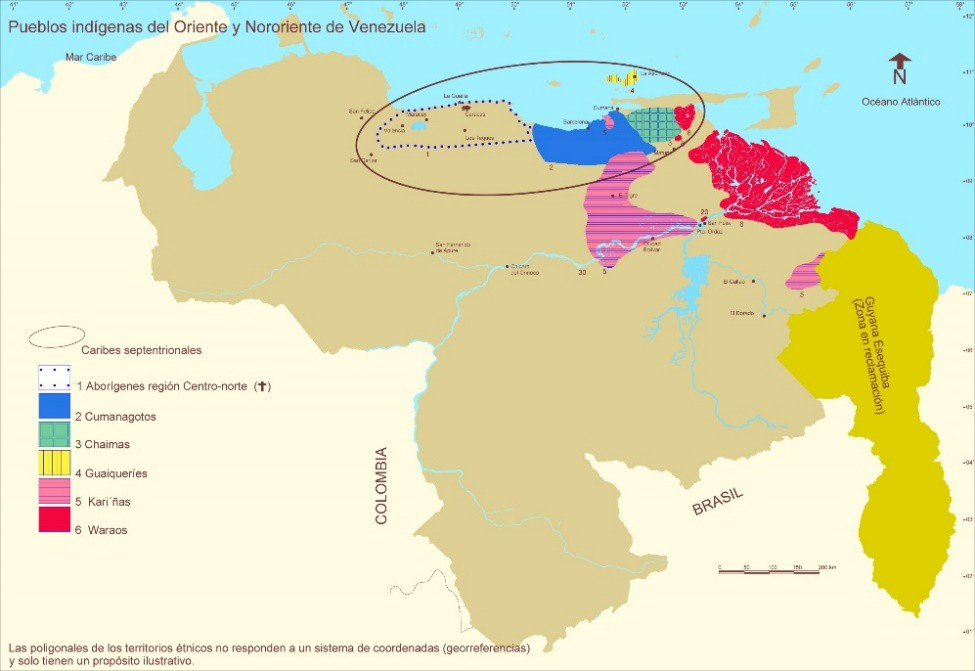

Cumanagoto (Cumanogota, Cumaná, Kumaná, Cumanagoto: choto maimuru), also Itoto Majun, Palank, Pariagoto or Tamanaku, is a nearly extinct Cariban language of eastern coastal Venezuela. It is the language of the Cumanagoto people and other nations. Extinct dialects include Palenque (presumably Palank), Piritu (Piritugoto), and Avaricoto.

== History ==
In the Venezuelan states of Anzoátegui, Sucre, Monagas, Miranda, Aragua, and Carabobo, a number of Indigenous peoples are reported by colonial sources, including the Cumanagotos, Pariagotos, Chaimas, Chacopatas, Píritus, Cuacas, Palenques, Mariches, Caracas, and Teques. Despite this diversity, there was a distinctive linguistic homogeneity in the region. Reports indicate that a singular language was spoken in this region with only minor dialectal variations spoken by the different peoples. The language was referred natively as choto maimuru. Following colonial reports in the 17th century, the Indigenous peoples of the region became acculturated and blended into the mestizo population. Despite this, 49 people were reported to speak the language in 2012. A language revitalization program has started.

== Phonology ==
=== Consonants ===
Cumanagoto consonants
	Bilabial	Coronal	Velar
Occlusive	p	t	k
Nasal	m	n	
Vibrant		ɺ ⟨r⟩	
Fricative		s	
Semiconsonant	w	j ⟨y⟩	

/w/ may also be pronounced as [ꞵ]. The phoneme represented as ⟨r⟩ is most likely the lateral tap [ɺ] as found in Kari'nja and Pemon. Occlusives may also be voiced allophonically; this is reflected in the transcription of the sources. /n/ may be palatalized to [ɲ] next to /i/ or /j/. /s, t/ may be realized as ⟨ch⟩. /j/ is pronounced [d] between two /a/ vowels.

=== Vowels ===
	Front	Central	Back
High	i	ɨ ⟨ü⟩	u
Mid	e	ə ⟨ö⟩	o
Low		a	

The vowel /ɨ/ is written as ⟨ui⟩ in colonial-era sources.
