= Coyaima =

- Municipality and town
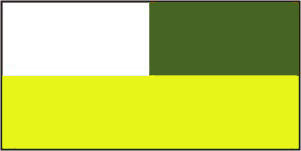
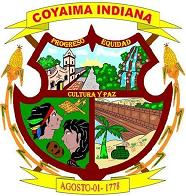
- Flag Coat of arms

- Location of the municipality and town of Coyaima in the Tolima Department of Colombia.
- Coordinates: 3°50′N 75°5′W
- Country: Colombia
- Department: Tolima Department

Government
  - Mayor: Oswaldo Mauricio Alape

Area
  - Total: 664.33 km^{2} (256.50 sq mi)
- Elevation: 392 m (1,286 ft)

Population (2017)
  - Total: 28,379
  - Density: 42.718/km^{2} (110.64/sq mi)
- Time zone: UTC-5 (Colombia Standard Time)
- Website: http://www.coyaima-tolima.gov.co/index.shtml

Coyaima is a town and municipality in the Tolima department of Colombia. The population of the municipality was 27,733 as of the 2005 census.

== Climate ==
Climate data for Coyaima (Media Luna), elevation 485 m (1,591 ft), (1981–2010)
Month	Jan	Feb	Mar	Apr	May	Jun	Jul	Aug	Sep	Oct	Nov	Dec	Year
Mean daily maximum °C (°F)	33.0 (91.4)	33.3 (91.9)	32.9 (91.2)	32.3 (90.1)	32.4 (90.3)	33.6 (92.5)	34.6 (94.3)	35.4 (95.7)	34.7 (94.5)	32.6 (90.7)	31.4 (88.5)	31.8 (89.2)	33.2 (91.8)
Daily mean °C (°F)	28.1 (82.6)	28.3 (82.9)	28.1 (82.6)	27.6 (81.7)	27.6 (81.7)	28.4 (83.1)	29.1 (84.4)	30.0 (86.0)	29.4 (84.9)	27.8 (82.0)	27.2 (81.0)	27.4 (81.3)	28.3 (82.9)
Mean daily minimum °C (°F)	23.3 (73.9)	23.5 (74.3)	23.5 (74.3)	23.4 (74.1)	23.3 (73.9)	23.3 (73.9)	23.6 (74.5)	24.2 (75.6)	23.8 (74.8)	23.2 (73.8)	23.2 (73.8)	23.1 (73.6)	23.4 (74.1)
Average precipitation mm (inches)	94.2 (3.71)	134.6 (5.30)	149.4 (5.88)	218.2 (8.59)	156.3 (6.15)	67.5 (2.66)	43.6 (1.72)	41.4 (1.63)	110.5 (4.35)	202.8 (7.98)	192.4 (7.57)	149.3 (5.88)	1,560.3 (61.43)
Average precipitation days	9	11	13	16	15	8	7	6	10	15	15	12	136
Average relative humidity (%)	71	70	72	76	75	66	58	55	61	72	78	77	69
Source: Instituto de Hidrologia Meteorologia y Estudios Ambientales
