= Cachorro River (Pará) =

- Location within Brazil
- Native name: Rio Cachorro (Portuguese)

Location
- Country: Brazil

Physical characteristics
- Source
  - location: Pará state
- Mouth
  - location: Trombetas River
  - coordinates: 0.999166°S 57.052171°W

Basin features
- River system: Trombetas River

The Cachorro River is a tributary of the Trombetas River in Pará state in north-central Brazil.

The Cachorro River flows through the 3,172,978 hectares (7,840,600 acres) Trombetas State Forest from north to south, and joins the Trombetas within the forest.

== See also ==
- List of rivers of Pará
