= Apalaí language =

Cariban language spoken in Brazil

Apalaí
- Aparaí
- Native to: Brazil
- Ethnicity: Aparai people
- Native speakers: 650 (2022)
- Language family: Cariban: Apalaí

Language codes
- ISO 639-3: apy
- Glottolog: apal1257
- ELP: Apalaí
- Linguasphere: 80-AGA-aa
- Apalai is classified as Vulnerable by the UNESCO Atlas of the World's Languages in Danger.

Apalaí is a Cariban language spoken in Brazil. Approximately 450 Aparai people speak Apalaí. It is an agglutinative language which uses a rare object–verb–subject word order.

== Phonology ==
=== Consonants ===
Consonants of Apalai
		Bilabial	Alveolar	Postalveolar	Palatal	Velar	Glottal
Stop		p	t			k	ʔ
Fricative	voiceless		s	ʃ			
Fricative	voiced		z				
Nasal		m	n				
Approximant					j	w	
Tap/Flap			ɾ				

=== Vowels ===
Vowels of Apalai
	Front		Central		Back	
	plain	nasal	plain	nasal	plain	nasal
High	i	ĩ	ɨ	ɨ̃	u	ũ
Mid	e	ẽ			o	õ
Low			a	ã		
