= Paru de Oeste River =

River in Brazil

- Paru de Oeste River (Brazil)

Location
- Country: Brazil

Physical characteristics
- Source
  - location: Pará, Brazil
- Mouth: Trombetas River
  - location: BR
  - coordinates: 1°31′10″S 56°02′05″W
- Length: 710 km (440 mi)

The Paru de Oeste River (Erepecuru River) is a tributary of the Trombetas River in Pará in north-central Brazil.

== Geography ==
In addition to the main river, it has a "loop" known as the Cuminá River, which finally merges into the Paru de Oeste River about 6 km (3.7 mi) before the latter merges into the Trombetas. The confluence of Paru de Oeste and Trombetas is almost 35 km (22 mi) upriver from the city of Oriximiná.

The river basin lies partly within the 4,245,819 hectares (10,491,650 acres) Grão-Pará Ecological Station, the largest fully protected tropical forest conservation unit on the planet.

Further south it flows through the 3,172,978 hectares (7,840,600 acres) Trombetas State Forest from north to south.

== See also ==
- List of rivers of Pará
