= Ikpeng language =

Cariban language spoken in Brazil

Ikpeng
- Txikāo
- Native to: Brazil
- Region: Xingu
- Ethnicity: Ikpeng people
- Native speakers: 500 (2013)
- Language family: Cariban: Pekodian; Arara; Ikpeng

Language codes
- ISO 639-3: txi
- Glottolog: ikpe1245
- ELP: Ikpéng
- Linguasphere: 80-AIA-c
- Ikpeng is classified as Vulnerable by the UNESCO Atlas of the World's Languages in Danger

The Ikpeng language is the language of the Ikpeng people (also known as Txikāo) who live in the Xingu Indigenous National Park in Mato Grosso, Brazil. There are approximately 500 speakers. Ikpeng is a language with high transmission, meaning it is passed on from parent to child at a high rate, with all members speaking the language. The majority of members are also bilingual speakers of Portuguese. The Ikpeng language is part of the Carib (Karib) language family.

== History ==
=== Early history ===
The Ikpeng were known to inhabit the same land as the Txipaya peoples, near the Iriri River, and they a strong alliance with that group in times of war. One oral history traces the Ikpeng ancestral territory as far as the Jari River. By 1850, the Ikpeng were known to inhabit an area of converging rivers thought to be the Teles Pires-Juruena river basin. Before 1900, the Ikpeng were at war with several polities, and even encountered settlers of European descent. War and the colonization of the Teles Pires-Juruena basin pushed the Ikpeng across the Formosa Mountain formation and into the Upper Xingu Basin.

=== Contact and relocation ===
On October 19, 1964, Orlando and Cláudio Villas-Boas encountered Ikpeng villages as they were flying over the Ronuro River in Mato Grosso. They lived near the Ronuro and Jabotá rivers and, when they were found malnourished and exposed to disease, they accepted resources and later relocation to the Xingu National Park in 1967. The Ikpeng dispersed for a short time, with different family groups living in different parts of the park, but later regrouped in the early 1970s near the Leonardo Villas-Boas Indigenous Post. By the 1980s, they had moved to the middle Xingu region, and currently administer the Pavuru Indigenous Post, as well as the Ronuro Vigilance Post, which is near their traditional land on the Jabotá river. From this post, they help defend the Xingu Park from illegal loggers and fishermen. The Ikpeng made an expedition in 2002 to the Jabotá River to collect medicinal plants and shells. They currently seek to regain this territory.

=== Schools ===
In the 1990s, the Ikpeng began to elaborate an education system within their community. In 1994, Ikpeng teachers developed a form of writing with the help of linguists. This was done through the Instituto Socioambiental's Teacher Training program, which has allowed Ikpeng children to learn their own language alongside Portuguese in the Ikpeng School. This school plays a central role in the project, and it is responsible for the creation of material and distribution of this material for Ikpeng communities within the Xingu Park.

== Classification ==
The Carib language family also referred to as Karib or Cariban, is a family with languages spoken in Colombia, Venezuela, the Mato Grosso region of Brazil and the three Guianas. The Carib language family comprises approximately 50 languages and is most commonly separated into regional language groups, such as Carib Central, Eastern, Northern etc. Carib languages were first encountered in the seventeenth and eighteenth century by Europeans, however, the full spatiality of the language family was not uncovered until the nineteenth century when Karl von den Steinen first documented the existence of Carib languages in Central Brazil. Although large, with a population of over twenty-two thousand speakers, Carib languages have faced drastic changes in its geography and prevalence in the region. Precolonial contact Carib languages were found throughout the Greater Antilles, however, much of the indigenous population was wiped out and the remaining population does not speak their indigenous languages.

== Documentation ==
=== Literature ===
The first record of documentation of Ikpeng was conducted by Eduardo Galvano in 1964 when he created a word list of 12 Ikpeng words. Recently, the Ikpeng language has been analyzed a number of academics most extensively by Frantome Pacheco and Cilene Campetela. Beginning in 1997, Pacheco wrote "Aspectos da gramática Ikpeng", which explored the morphology, orthography, grammar structure, prosodic aspects, among other topics. Further into the exploration of Ikpeng, Pacheco wrote "Morfossintaxe do verbo Ikpeng" in 2001, an academic article solely focused on the morphology and syntax of Ikpeng. In 2005 he wrote "O Ikpeng em contato com o português: empréstimo lexical e adaptação lingüística", an article on the influence of Portuguese on the Ikpeng language and its impact on cultural practices. Most recently in 2007 he wrote, "Morfofonologia dos prefixos pessoais em Ikpeng", which focuses on phonology and morphology. Cilene Campetela concurrently with Pacheco has published articles on Ikpeng since 1997. In 1997 she released "Análise do sistema de marcação de caso nas orações independentes da língua Ikpeng", which focused on phonology and morphology. "Aspectos prosódicos da língua Ikpeng" by Campetela was then released in 2002 and exclusively analysed the prosodic aspects of Ikpeng.

Along with Pacheco and Capetela, there have been a number of studies done by other researchers. Most notably, the 2008 ProDocLin project documenting the Ikpeng language in different social contexts via audiovisuals with an accompanying lexicon database was conducted by Dr. Angela Fabiola Alves Chagas with assistance from Ingrid Lemos and Maria Luisa Freitas. Further research on the Ikpeng language includes an analysis of the Ikpeng Phonology by Eduardo Alves Vasconcelos, Maria Luisa Freitas' 2015 piece on the Grammatical pedagogy and Linguistic Changes by Wellington Quintino.

=== Projects ===
The Museu do Indio's documentation department, the Documentation Project of Indigenous Languages, has executed a documentation project on Ikpeng. It was led by Angela Chegas, assisted by associate researchers Ingrid Lemos and Maria Luisa Freitas, with Ikpeng consultation. The project aimed to document cultural and linguistic aspects of the Ikpeng people. This was accomplished through audio visual recordings of conversation, songs, stories, and ceremonial speech. The extensive lexical data and transcriptions are stored in a digitized data bank for researchers to access.

== Phonology ==
=== Consonants ===
	Bilabial	Alveolar	Palatal	Velar
Nasal	m	n		ŋ
Plosive	p	t		k g
Affricate		tʃ		
Lateral		l		
Tap		ɾ (r)		
Glide	β̞ (w)		j (y)	

- /β̞/ and /j/ can also be realized as fricatives [β] and [ʝ].
- /p/ can be heard as a fricative [ɸ] in word-medial position, in front of a rounded back vowel, as voiced [b] when preceding /l/ in word-medial position, or as a voiced fricative [β] when between vowels.

=== Vowels ===
	Front	Central	Back
High	i	ɨ	u
Mid	e		o
Low		a	

- /e, o/ can also be heard as open mid [ɛ, ɔ].
- /i, u/ when occurring after a consonant, or preceding a vowel, can be shortened as [i̯, u̯].
- /e, o/ may also be nasalized as [ẽ, õ] when preceding nasal consonants in medial position.

== Morphology ==
Words in the Ikpeng language, like in many other languages, depend on a variety of morphemes in the form of prefixes, affixes and suffixes to detail the function of specific words. Researchers of Ikpeng, notably Frantome Pacheco, have given special attention to the Ikpeng verb morphology, in which morphemes are used to give nuance to words in the language; they determine the subject or object that is conjugated in the verb, tense, number (plural and singular), inclusivity, causation, interrogation, negation and other more specific characteristics. The word classes present in Ikpeng are verbs, nouns, adjectives, pronouns, prepositions, and particles, and each have a variety of morphemes specific to their word class.

=== Pronouns ===
==== Independent personal pronouns ====
Grammatical person	Pronoun	
Grammatical person	Singular	Plural
First	uro	
Second	omro	omro-ŋmo
First inclusive	ugro	ugro-ŋmo
First exclusive	tʃimna	

t-otupit uro
PG-satiate I
"I am satisfied"

k-ineŋ-lɨ omro
1.A.2.O-see-REC you
"I saw you"

t-otupit-ket ugro
PG-satiate-ADJZ we:INCL
"We are satisfied"

tʃimna y-aginum-lɨ
we:EXCL 3-cry-REC
"We cry"

atʃina omro-ŋmo
{to where} you-COL
"Where are you going?"

==== Demonstrative pronouns ====
	Proximal		Distal	
	Animate	Inanimate	Animate	Inanimate
Singular	oren	nen	ugun	mun
Plural	wan	neyam	ugyam	muyan

ugun pe-wa
he:DIST:ANIM EXIST-NEG
"It's not him"

e-woy-n ɨpe oren
3-clothes-GEN EXIST him:PROX:ANIM
"He has clothes"

neyam kɨtpip
those pretty
"Those are pretty"

Interrogative pronouns
Interrogative	Translation and use	Function
onok	who (for animates)	Argumental
arɨ	what (for inanimates, or to ask for facts)	Argumental
onok ɨna	for whom	Oblique
onok pak	with whom	Oblique
arɨ ge	with what	Oblique
arɨ wok	in what	Oblique
ara	how	Adverbial
arato	why, what was	Adverbial
arakeni	in what way	Adverbial
arakenip	when	Adverbial
otumunto	where	Adverbial
otumɨna	to where, wherever	Adverbial
otumɨlo	around where, wherever	Adverbial
atʃina	in which direction	Adverbial

=== Desideratives ===
In English, there exist separate verbs to express desire, like for instance 'to want.' By contrast, the Ikpeng language contains a morpheme to express desire or want, called a desiderative. The morpheme is /–tɨne/, and it is attached as a suffix to the verb in order to indicate that one wants to do a certain action (the verb).

y-ak-tɨne pow
1.A.3.O-eat-DES pork
"I want to eat pork"

Tawi ∅-ak-tɨne pow
Davi 3.A.3.O-eat-DES pork
"Davi wants to eat pork"

This morpheme is also used with auxiliary verbs, when the predicate has non-verbal elements at its core.

ugw-erem pe m-it-tɨne omro
1+2-chief EXIST 2-AUX-DES you
"You want to be our chief"

=== Morphemes to indicate immediate past ===
Ikpeng uses to morphemes to conjugate verbs in the "immediate past," meaning a period of time understood to be the moment right before the present and, at the very latest, yesterday. These morphemes are /–lɨ/ and /–lan/, with /–lɨ/ being used for actions witnessed by the speaker, and /–lan/ for actions that were not witnessed by the speaker.

Areplɨ tupi {} muin.
∅-arep-lɨ tupi ∅ mui-n
3.A.3.O-arrive-IM whiteman ∅ canoe-POSS
"The white man's canoe arrived"

(This event happened moments before and is witnessed by the speaker.)

Anmelan Cilene Fran.
∅-anme-lan Cilene Fran
3.A.3.O-push-IM Cilene Fran
"Cilene pushed Fran"

(This event happened the day before and was not witnessed by the speaker.)

== Syntax ==
=== Valency of verbs ===
Ikpeng has two different methods to determine increasing valency through causatives related to the verb: the morphological causative, which is added as an affix to the verb, and the lexicalized causative, which uses an independent causative verb and another word is added as sentence complement.

Morphological causatives (affixes) are used to change both transitive verb sentences and intransitive verb sentences to transitive causative verbs and intransitive causative verbs respectively. The morpheme used for the affix is /-nopo/, with allomorphs such as /nop/ or /nob/ when inserted after a vowel, /pon/ and /poŋ/ after consonants, and /mpo/ which can be explained as an assimilation of the nasal sound (n) in /nopo/. Below are examples of the construction of the causative verb using morphemes.

==== Intransitive ====
petkom y-umene-nob-lɨ tarɨwe
woman 3.So-dry-CAUS-REC manioc
"The woman dried the manioc"

In the above sentence, the causative morpheme indicates that it was the woman who caused the manioc to dry, instead of simply saying "the manioc dried."

==== Transitive ====
gwakpitkeni y-aginum-po-lɨ aŋpi
nurse 3.O-cry-CAUS-REC boy
"The nurse made the boy cry"

A particular hierarchy needs to be considered when dealing with morphological causatives, concerning the type of argument that is found in the sentence (S- subject, A- agent, and O- object).

"Subject or Agent (S, A) > direct object (O) > not direct object or Oblique"

Lexicalized causatives are separate verbs in the sentences used to indicate increased valency. In Ikpeng, these are often verbs such a (in English) 'to order'. These only happen in cases where the main verb is the causative (the ordering verb like 'to order,' or 'to do') and the action that is being ordered is added as complement of the phrase, instead of an otherwise completed verb.

Tʃileni ∅-anoŋ-lɨ aŋpi [∅-aranrnet-poto]
Cilene 3.A.3.O-order-REC boy [3.A.3.O-run-NMZ]
"Cilene made/ordered the boy to run"

In this sentence, the first highlighted verb is the commanding verb "order" in this case, and the bracketed section is the verb that is being ordered, in this case "to run." The lexicalized verb in this case is 'to order.'

== Semantics ==
=== Plurals ===
Ikpeng has multiple suffixes and prefixes which denote plurality of objects, events, verbs and nouns.

==== Object and iterative suffixes ====
To denote plural objects in Ikpeng, the suffixes /-tke/ and /-ke/ are employed. Additionally, these suffixes can be interpreted as iterative suffixes as they are also used to express the repetition of an action. Distinguishing the use of the suffixes is contextual as there is no consistent differentiation between the two uses.

iŋwotkelɨ ɨtɨŋ tae
i-ŋwo-tke-lɨ ɨtɨŋ tae
1.A.3.O-hunt-PL-IM many monkeys
"I hunted many monkeys"

==== Verb plurals ====
Verb plurals are classified in three ways, plurals for the not future, and questions (interrogative).

To express plurality or a collective in not future tenses, the suffix /-kom/~ /ŋmo/ is attached to the end of the verb.

pro geneŋlɨŋmo
pro g-eneŋ-lɨ-ŋmo
{} 3.A.1.O-see-REC-COL
"They say me"

To express plurality or a collective in an interrogative phrase, the suffix /-tom/~/rom/ is attached at the end of the verb. This suffix is typically associated with the use of second person.

pro menentom torempantum
pro m-enen-tom torempantum
{} 2.A.3.O-see-COL student
"Did you (plural) see the student?"

==== Nouns ====
To express the quantity of whom possesses an object in the promonimal context, the suffix /-kom/~ /ŋmo/ is attached to the object.

opunkom
o-pu-n-kom
2-feet-POS-COL
"The feet of yours"

To express the quantity of the possessors in the nominal form, the suffix /-niŋkɨn/ is after the nominal morpheme.

Ikeŋ niŋkɨn pun
Ikpeng COL feet
"The feet of the Ikpeng"

When there is an agreement between nominal morphemes, /-niŋkɨn/ is used after the morpheme /keni/ to indicate plurals.

Melobô terulɨ topkak Tʃileni Paran keni niŋkɨn ɨna
Melobô t-eru-lɨ topkak [Tʃileni Paran keni niŋkɨn] ɨna
Melobô 3.O-give-REC bow Cilene Fran PART PL DAT:to
'Melobô gave the bow to Cilene and Fran'

==== Pronouns ====
In Ikpeng, demonstrative third-person pronouns are used to indicate the distance and animacy of the entity in relation to the speaker.

Demonstrative third-person pronouns
	Proximal		Distal	
	Animate	Inanimate	Animate	Inanimate
Plural	wan	neyam	ugyam	muyan

ugyam øarawɨtke-naŋme
ugy-am ø-ar-waɨtke-naŋme
They:DIST:ANIM:PL 3.Sa-REFL-fight-CONT-REC
"They are fighting"

Independent personal pronouns express free grammars and occupy argumentative position.

Independent personal pronouns
Grammatical person	Pronoun	
Grammatical person	Singular	Plural
First	uro	
Second	omro	omro-ŋmo
First inclusive	ugro	ugro-ŋmo
First exclusive	tʃimna	

atʃina omro-ŋmo
{to where} you-COL
"Where are you (PL) going"

== Sources ==
- Campetela, Cilene (1997). Análise do Sistema de Marcação de Caso nas Orações Independentes da Língua Ikpeng (PDF) (Masters thesis). Universidade de Campinas.
- Galvão, Eduardo. 1996. Diários do Xingu (1947–1967). UFRJ, p. 249-381.
- Meira, S.; Franchetto, B. (2005). "The Southern Cariban Languages and the Cariban Family". International Journal of American Linguistics. 71 (2): 127–192. doi:10.1086/491633.
- Menget, Patrick; Troncarelli, Maria Cristina (2003). "Ikpeng". Instituto Socioambiental: Povos Indígenas no Brasil.
- Moore, D. (2006). "Brazil: Language Situation". In Keith Brown (ed.). Encyclopedia of Language & Linguistics. Oxford: Elsevier. pp. 117–128.
- Pacheco, Fantomé Bezerra (1997). Aspectos da gramática Ikpeng (Karib) (PDF) (Masters thesis). Instituto de Estudos da Linguagem Universidade de Campinas. From Etnolinguistica page on Ikpeng
- Pacheco, Frantomé Bezerra (2001). Morfossintaxe do verbo Ikpeng (Karib) (PDF) (PhD thesis) (in Portuguese). Instituto de Estudos da Linguagem Universidade de Campinas.
- Pacheco, Frantomé Bezerra (2005). "O Ikpeng em contato com o português: empréstimo lexical e adaptação lingüística" (PDF). Papia (15). Universidade de São Paulo and Fundação de Amparo à Pesquisa do Estado de São Paulo: 121–133.
- Rodgers, D. (2013). "The filter trap: Swarms, anomalies, and the quasi-topology of Ikpeng shamanism". HAU: Journal of Ethnographic Theory. 3 (3): 77–80. doi:10.14318/hau3.3.005.
