= Nhamundá River =

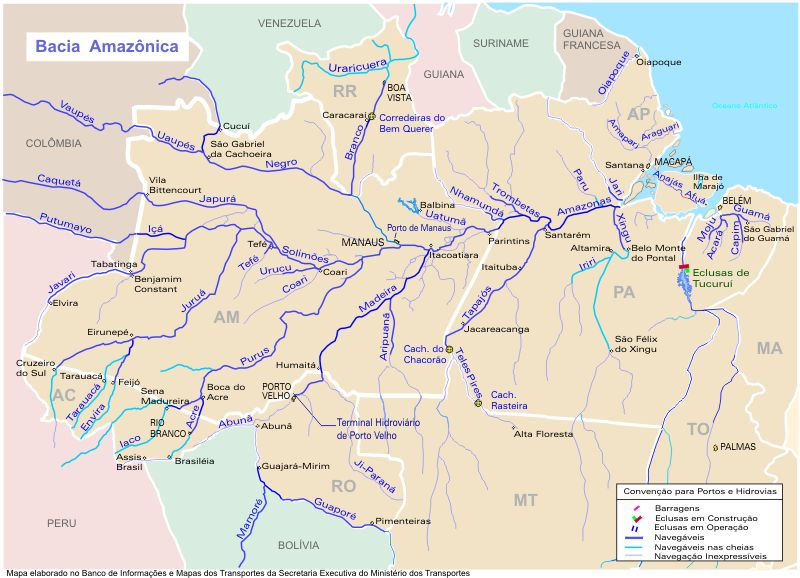
- Location of the mouth of the Nhamundá River in the Amazon river watershed

Location
- Country: Brazil

Physical characteristics
- Source
  - location: Amazonas, Brazil
- Mouth: Trombetas River
  - location: Oriximiná, Pará, Brazil
  - coordinates: 1°46′19″S 55°52′48″W
- Length: 470 km (290 mi)
- Discharge
  - average: 1,000 m^{3}/s (35,000 cu ft/s)

Nhamundá River or Jamundá River (Yamundá River in Spanish) is a river in northern Brazil, which marks part of the northeastern boundary between states of Amazonas and Pará. The 300 km long Nhamundá River originates in the plateau Serra do Jatapu near the division of the Brazilian States of Roraima, Amazonas and Pará, and from there it flows in a southeastern direction, forming the natural division between Amazonas and Pará. It then crosses the Nhamundá-Mapuera Reserve (EG033) before joining the Trombetas River near the city of Oriximiná. The river, which flows through the Lago Nhamundá, is the last major right-hand affluent of the Trombetas River before the Trombetas joins the Amazon River. The mouth is located about 480 km east (downstream on the Amazon) of Manaus.

The three towns on the river's lower reaches (Terra Santa, Nhamundá, and Faro) are accessible only by boat.

== See also ==
- List of rivers of Amazonas
- List of rivers of Pará
