= Maicuru River =

- Location within Brazil
- Native name: Rio Maicuru (Portuguese)

Location
- Country: Brazil

Physical characteristics
- Source
  - location: Tumucumaque Mountains National Park, Guyana Shield
  - coordinates: 0°2′23.2728″S 54°36′9.486″W
  - elevation: 331 m (1,086 ft)
- Mouth
  - location: Monte Alegre, Pará
  - coordinates: 2°0′16.6536″S 54°2′9.4344″W
  - elevation: 3 m (9.8 ft)
- Length: 547 km (340 mi) to 610 km (380 mi)
- Basin size: 21,917 km^{2} (8,462 mi^{2})
- Discharge
  - location: Monte Alegre (near mouth)
  - average: 240 m^{3}/s (8,500 cu ft/s)
- Discharge
  - location: Arapari, Pará (basin size: 17,072 km^{2} (6,592 sq mi)
  - average: (Period: 01/01/1997-27/02/2014) 127.2518 m^{3}/s (4,493.85 cu ft/s)

Basin features
- River system: Amazon River
- Tributaries
  - left: Igarapé do Barreirinha, Igarapé Jangada, Igarapé Ipixuna, Igarapé 23, Igarapé Fartura, Igarapé Açu
  - right: Igarapé Santa Maria

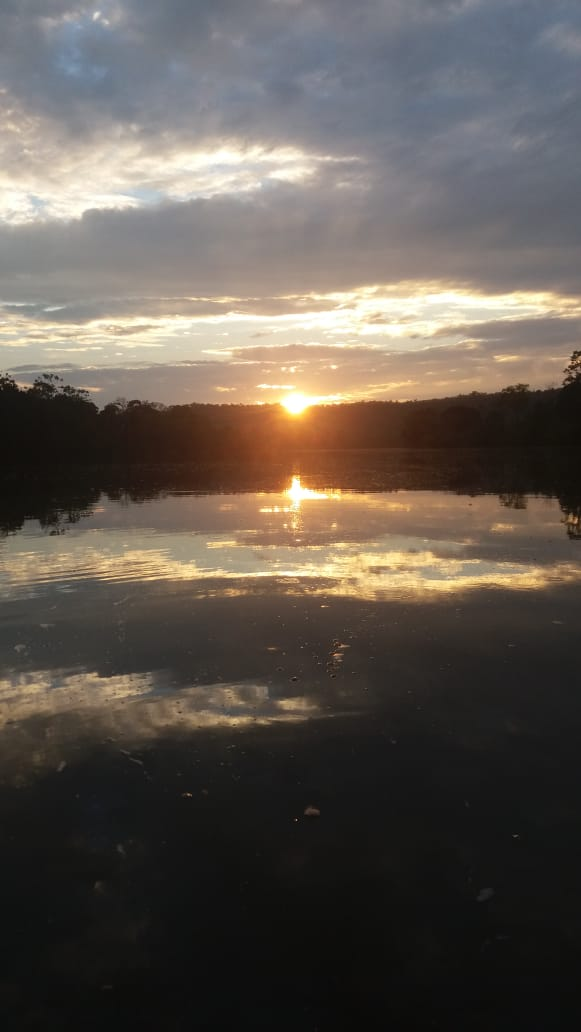
Picture of the river

The Maicuru River is a river of Pará state in north-central Brazil, a tributary of the Amazon that discharges into that river via the Lago Grande de Monte Alegre.

The river basin lies partly within the 4,245,819 hectares (10,491,650 acres) Grão-Pará Ecological Station, the largest fully protected tropical forest conservation unit on the planet. Part of the river's basin is in the Maicuru Biological Reserve. The river is also fed by streams in the 216,601 hectares (535,230 acres) Mulata National Forest, a sustainable use conservation unit created in 2001.

== See also ==
- List of rivers of Pará
