= Timeline of Amazon history =

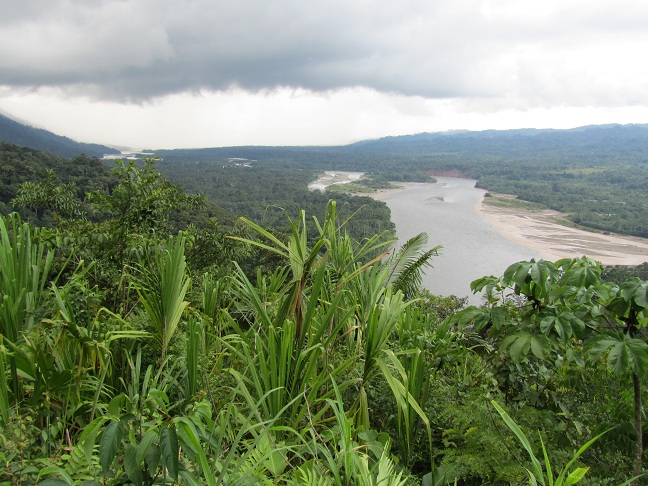
View of Manú National Park in the Amazon rainforest

This is a timeline of Amazon's history, which dates back at least 11 thousand years, since humans left indications of their presence in Caverna da Pedra Pintada.

Here is a brief timeline of historical events in the Amazon River valley.

== Pre-Columbian era ==
- Around the 6th century – The Casarabe culture flourishes in what is now Bolivia.
- Early 11th century – The island of Marajó flourishes as an Amazonian cultural center, rich in ceramics and pottery, under the Marajoara culture.

== 15th century ==
- May 4, 1493 – The Inter cætera was issued, a bull by Pope Alexander VI, which granted to the Catholic Monarchs King Ferdinand II and Queen Isabella I all lands after a pole-to-pole line of 100 leagues west of the Cape Verde archipelago. This would leave the Amazon jungle entirely to the Spanish.
- June 7, 1494 – The Treaty of Tordesillas was signed, which divides both the New and Old World into Spanish and Portuguese claims. The line runs north–south some 100km east of what's now Belém, Pará.
- August 1, 1498 – Christopher Columbus, Pedro de Terrerros, and their ships found Orinoco River's mouth in the Gulf of Paria, present-day Venezuela, and planted the Spanish flag. This event in his third voyage marked the first European encounter with South America, recognized as a continent from the topography. Columbus retained the belief that it was Asia.
- 1499 or 1500 – Vicente Yáñez Pinzón, capitain of Niña on Colombus' first voyage, sighted a river, perhaps the Orinoco or the Amazon, and ascended to a point about fifty miles from the sea, calling it the "Río Santa María de la Mar Dulce" ("River of Saint Mary of the Fresh Water Sea") on account of the vastness of the fresh river's mouth.
- January 26, 1500 – Spanish navigator, Vicente Pinzón, discovered what is now Brazil, landing on the Cape of Saint Augustine, months before Cabral. Some historians say it was the "Ponta do Mucuripe" instead.
- April 22 or May 3, 1500 – Brazil was discovered by the Portuguese explorer and military commander Pero Álvares Cabral and his armada while en route to the Indies, landing in Porto Seguro. It is not known whether the change of route was on purpose, but the expedition was considered a failure and Cabral was sentenced to pay a yearly pension of 30 thousand reais because of it. Around 1520 he died in obscurity and his grave was only re-discovered in 1839 by Francisco Adolfo de Varnhagen.

== 16th century ==
- 1541–42 – The first exploration of the Amazon, done by Francisco de Orellana (ca. 1511–1546), is chronicled by friar Gaspar de Carvajal. He travelled via the Rio Napo, from Quito to the Atlantic, fighting Indigenous women he calls "Amazonas," whose name sticks to the river.
- 1560–61 – Second exploration of the Amazon, this time done by the conquistador Lope de Aguirre.
- 1595 – Sir Walter Raleigh leads an expedition to colonize the Orinoco River for the English. In 1616, he settled in Trinidad.

== 17th century ==
- 1616 – Santa Maria do Grão Pará de Belém is founded, marking Portuguese presence as the French, English, and Irish try to colonize the region.
- 1619 – The settlement of Borja is founded on the banks of the Marañón River, Peru.
- 1637–39 – Pedro Teixeira leads the first European expedition up the Amazon from Belém to Quito, arriving unexpectedly.
- 1638 – First Jesuit mission is founded at Borja in Mainas, Peru on the banks of the Marañón River.

== 18th century ==
- 1726 – Francisco Xavier de Moraes, ascending the Rio Negro, discovers the Casiquiare canal to the Orinoco.
- 1736 – Charles Marie de La Condamine sends the first rubber sample to Europe from his expedition to the Amazon.
- 1750 – The Treaty of Madrid fixed boundaries between the Iberian empires in South America. Portuguese possessions west of the Tordesillas line are recognized, based on occupation.
- 1759 – Jesuits are expelled from the colonies of Brazil and Maranhão by the Marquis of Pombal, leaving the 'Indians' without protection.
- 1799 – Prussian Naturalist, Alexander von Humboldt, explores the Orinoco and proves the link via the Casiquiare canal to Rio Negro. Humboldt refused permission to enter Portuguese colonial territory.

== 19th century ==
- 1808–25 – Spanish rule in South America ends with revolutions led by Simón Bolívar in the north, San Martín in the South, and O'Higgins in Chile. On the year of 1808, the Portuguese royal family arrived in Brazil to escape Napoleon's invasion.
- 1818–20 – Spix and Martius go on expedition in the Amazon.
- 1822 – On September 7, Brazil proclaims independence under the famous discourse of "Independência ou Morte!" by Portuguese prince, Dom Pedro I, at the banks of Ipiranga, who would later become king and then emperor of Brazil.
- 1823 – Charles Macintosh invents waterproof rubber capes.
- 1826–28 – Baron von Langsdorff on expedition from Cuiabá to Belém, arriving with sanity impaired.
- 1826–28 – Cabanagem revolt occurs in Belém and Manaus, claiminforty thousandnd fatalities.
- 1826–33 – Alcide Charles Victor d'Orbigny conducts a scientific tour of South America, including the Amazon valley.
- 1827–32 – Eduard Friedrich Poeppig conducts a scientific exploration through Chile, Peru, and the upper Amazon.
- 1834–35 – British naval officers William Smyth and Frederick Lowe travel from Lima, Peru across the Andes and down the entire length of the Amazon, seeking a navigable route for trade from the west to the east coast of South America. They publish their account in the following year, 1836.
- 1839 – Charles Goodyear invents vulcanization of rubber, it becomes an important component of the Industrial Revolution.
- 1839–42 – Brothers Robert and Richard Schomburgk expedite in northern Brazil.
- 1842 – Prince Adalbert of Prussia visits the Xingu River.
- 1842–45 – Tardy de Montravel conducts a mapping expedition of the northern coast of Brazil and 1000 km up the lower Amazon.
- 1846 – François Louis de la Porte, comte de Castelnau travels to the Araguaia and Tocantins Rivers.
- At the same year, William Henry Edwards, American businessman and amateur entomologist, voyages up the Amazon, publishing his account in 1847, being read by Bates and Wallace, inspiring them to go to Brazil the following year.
- 1848–59 – Henry Walter Bates and Alfred Russel Wallace go to the Amazon. Wallace leaves in 1852 and Bates stays until 1859.
- 1849–64 – Spruce, of cinchona fame, in the Amazon. He gets the quinine tree seeds in 1860.
- 1850 – Manaus is the new capital of the Amazonas province.
- 1850–1915 – Rubber boom sucks tens of thousands of immigrants into the Amazon, mostly from the drought-stricken northeastern region of Brazil (the Northeast Region didn't include Bahia or Sergipe back then).
- 1851–52 – Lieutenants William Lewis Herndon and Lardner Gibbon of the United States Navy go on the Amazon to Belém.
- 1858 – Brazil guarantees to Peru the right to navigation on the Amazon River.
- 1860s – William Chandless conducts expeditions on the southern tributaries of the Amazon for the Royal Geographical Society.
- 1861–63 – João Martins da Silva Coutinho travels through the rubber harvesting areas of the Amazon valley and later accompanies Louis Agassiz.
- 1865–66 – Swiss-American naturalist and biologist, Louis Agassiz and geologist Charles F. Hartt expedite in the Amazon.
- 1866 – Founding of the Goeldi Museum of Natural History in Belém by Domingos Soares Ferreira Penna and others. Agassiz had given stimulus to this when he was in the Amazon.
- 1867 – Brazil opens the Amazon River to international shipping services, that same year Confederate expatriates settle in Santarém.
- 1867 – Franz Keller-Leuzinger surveys the possibility of routing a railroad along the Madeira River to link Peru to Amazon commerce.
- 1867 – American Explorer, James Orton travels from Quito, Ecuador to the Amazon via the Napo River, later writing an account of his trip.
- 1870–71 – Morgan Expedition, led by Charles F. Hartt and assisted by student Herbert Huntington Smith, conducts a geological and zoological survey of the northern portion of the Amazon valley.
- 1873 – James Orton returns to Brazil and travels along the Amazonic Eastside from Belém to Lima.
- 1874–78 – Herbert Huntington Smith collects specimen based in Santarém, he later joins Charles F. Hartt to make surveys for the Brazilian Geological Survey.
- 1875–76 – A teenager from Indianapolis, US called Ernest T. Morris makes the first of his six trips to the Amazon valley to collect butterflies, beetles, and orchids for American collectors. His later trips were detailed in a series of columns for the New York World.
- 1876 – Henry Wickham takes some seventy-thousand rubber tree seeds to Kew Gardens in England, starting the collapse of the Rubber Boom era.
- 1878 – Theatro da Paz opens in Belém, Pará.
- 1879 – Herbert Huntington Smith returns to Brazil to write a series of popular travel narratives for the Scribners Magazine, later expanded into a book.
- 1888 – Scottish inventor, John Boyd Dunlop, invents the rubber tube tire.
- 1889 – The Proclamation of the Republican coup d'état, leaving the Brazilian imperial family in exile to Europe and establishing a dictatorship led by Deodoro da Fonseca.
- 1889 – Peruvian entrepreneur and politician, Julio César Arana, along with his brother in law, move to Iquitos, establishing business there.
- 1889–1913 – Arana and his company establish themselves as the main perpetrators of the Putumayo genocide, while collecting rubber from enslaved natives.
- 1893 – Carlos Fermín Fitzcarrald discovers and crosses the Fitzcarrald isthmus: establishing a connection between the Urubamba River and Madre de Dios River in Peru.
- 1895 – International arbitration forces Venezuela to cede large area to the British, that area is still disputed with the now independent Guyana.
- 1895–99 – Henri Coudreau and Octavie Coudreau explore Amazon waterways of Pará.
- 1897 – Manaus' opera house, the Teatro Amazonas opens. Rubber booming.
- 1897 – Rubber barons Carlos Fermín Fitzcarrald and Antonio de Vaca Díez drown in an accident on the Urubamba river.
- 1898–99 – The British Red Cross Line began transportation service between Iquitos and Liverpool in 1898. Booth Steamship Company also began operating in Iquitos, and provided a monthly route to Liverpool and New York.
- 1899–1902 – Acre proclaims itself independent of Bolivia, which in 1901 cedes rights to Acre to the New York Rubber Syndicate.

== 20th century ==
- November 17, 1903 – Acre becomes Brazilian by the Treaty of Petrópolis, in which Bolivia is promised a railroad link to the Madeira River at Porto Velho, today's Rondônia.
- 1907 – Madeira-Mamoré Railroad is built by Americans under Percival Farquar. Colonel Church's attempts in 1870–1881 are best called disasters made heroic by tragedy.
- 1908–1911 – Henry Ford, then the richest person in the world, invests in Amazon rubber plantations on the Tapajós River.
- 1908–1911 – Arana's rubber company on the Putamayo River is denounced for atrocities against Indians. English parliamentary inquiry in 1910. (Arana dies in 1952 in Lima after serving as Peruvian senator.)
- 1912 – After other countries steal seedlings from Brazil, rubber from Malaysia exceeds that coming out of the Amazon.
- 1913 – Former US president Theodore Roosevelt and Brazilian Field Marshal Cândido Rondon on Amazon expedition down the River of Doubt (now the Roosevelt River) (Roosevelt, 1919).
- 1914 – Rubber boom bursts with the emergence of cheaper sources of rubber.
- 1922 – Salomón-Lozano Treaty awards Leticia to Colombia, as an outlet to the Amazon River. In 1933, Peru seizes Leticia but backs down under international pressure, and in 1935 Leticia is reoccupied by Colombia.
- 1925 – Colonel Percy Fawcett vanishes near the headwaters of the Xingu River. His eyeglasses are later found among the Kayapó Indians of the Xingu River valley.
- 1942 – Brazil enters World War II. Demand is high for Amazon rubber. Brazil launches the ill-fated "Rubber Soldiers" program.
- 1947 – Cerro Bolívar, iron ore deposit south of Puerto Ordaz, Venezuela, is found and estimated at half a billion tons of high-grade ore. Puerto Ordaz is selected in 1953 as site for steel mill and huge hydroelectric plant.
- 1962 – Belém-Brasília Highway opens as first major all-year Amazon highway, linking Amazon River port city of Belém with the rest of Brazil.
- 1967 – Iron ore deposit at Serra dos Carajás is discovered in the eastern Brazilian Amazon. High quality ore (66% iron) is estimated at 18 billion tons.
- 1967–1983 – American businessman Daniel K. Ludwig invests heavily in Jari wood pulp and lumber plantation. His losses would amount to over 500 million dollars.
- 1974 – Manaus-Porto Velho highway opens.
- 1980 – Gold deposit at Serra Pelada is discovered. By 1986, an estimated 42 tons of gold are extracted from giant pit mine. Amazon gold rush is in full swing. In 1987 striking gold miners would be machine-gunned when they seize the railroad bridge at Marabá.
- 1982 – First person to navigate the origin on the Amazon Kayaker Caril Ridley, sponsored by the Cousteau Foundation, Cousteau Amazon Expedition, https://en.wikipedia.org/wiki/Nevado_Mismi.
- 1984 – Tucuruí hydroelectric dam is inaugurated, guaranteeing energy to the country.
- 1996 – Renewed military presence seen in the Amazon region of Brazil, as a result of radar project and militarization of the borders against drug traffic. Secret project SIVAM is revealed.

== 21st century ==
- 2005 – Worst drought in 50 years hits the western Amazon Basin.
- 2006 – GOL Transportes Aéreos Flight 1907 crashes.
- 2010 – Drought hits the rainforest.
- 2013 – Using data accumulated over 10 years, researchers estimate there are 390 billion trees in the Amazon rainforest, divided into 16,000 different species.
- 2024 – Drought hits the rainforest.
