= Octavie Coudreau =

French geographer

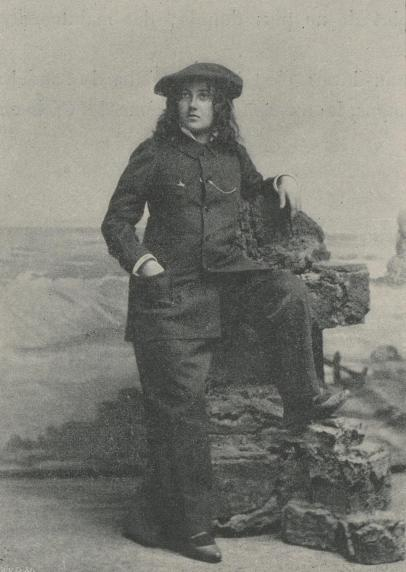

Marie Octavie Coudreau (née Renard; 1867–1938) was a French explorer from Anais, Charente, and author of several books on French Guiana and northern Brazil. In 1899, the Brazilian states of Pará and Amazonas hired Coudreau to explore and chart the Amazon region. Her husband was the French explorer and geographer Henri Coudreau.

== Exploration of the Amazon ==
At the time of the contesté franco-brésilien boundary dispute between colonial France and Brazil, Coudreau's husband Henri worked in the service of governors of the states of Brazil, mapping the Amazon's tributaries and identifying possible resources for farmers and foresters. On behalf of the State of Pará, Henri Coudreau was charged with exploring the Trombetas River, shortly after Octavie married him.

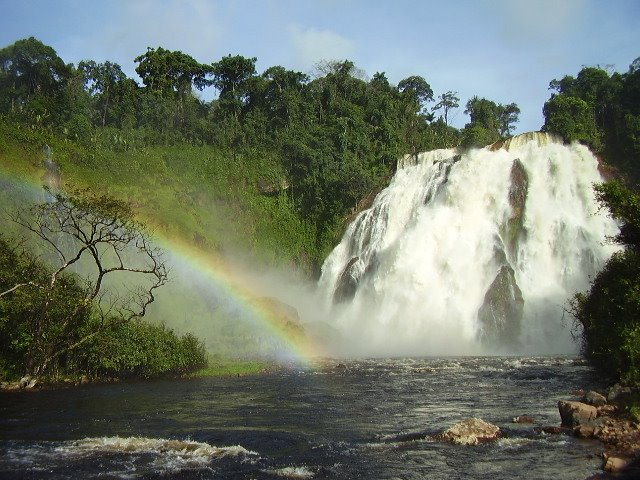
A waterfall on the Rio Curua, in Brazil. Coudreau wrote of her expedition on the river in Voyage Au Rio Curua (1903).

Their first expedition in 1899 ended tragically, as detailed in the book Voyage au Trombetas begun by Henri Coudreau. It describes their voyage up the Trombetas tributary of the north bank of the Amazon. He was already sick and exhausted by the years spent in what he called the "green hell". Suffering from malarial fever, he died in her arms on 10 November 1899. Aided by his traveling companions, she made a coffin from the planks of the boat and prepared a burial on a promontory overlooking Lake Tapagem.

After Henri Coudreau's death, she continued the exploration work begun by her husband for seven years. She later wrote the final chapters of the book, following the repatriation of his remains to Angoulême in France.

"If I'm an explorateur - this word can not bear to be feminine - it is not for the sake of the glory, which is far too fickle a goddess and more blind than Fortune; it is not for love of geography, I think I should greatly love geography when I do not. If I do exploration, it is to allow me to reunite the remains of my husband with those of his elderly parents; it is that Henri Coudreau should not remain forever in a well-loved foreign land; it is also to complete the work begun five years ago, useful work among all because it consists mainly to publicize the lands still ignored by the masses." (Voyage au Cumina, 1900)

From 1899 to 1906, she worked as an official explorer for the French government, a role not normally open to women at the time. Enduring the same levels of hardship that had eventually killed her husband, she made pioneering contributions to the knowledge of the Amazon tropical area.

She died in Sonnac.

== Published works ==
- Voyage Au Trombetas: 7 Août 1899-25 Novembre 1899, ISBN 978-1148473758
- Voyage Au Cuminá: 20 Avril 1900-7 Septembre 1900
- Voyage Au Maycur, 5 Juin 1902-12 Janvier, 1903
- Voyage Au Rio Curua (1903)
