= Monte Alegre State Park =

State park in Pará, Brazil

- Parque Estadual Monte Alegre
- IUCN category II (national park)
- Location within Brazil
- Nearest city: Monte Alegre, Pará
- Coordinates: 2.043440°S 54.169246°W
- Area: 3,678 hectares (9,090 acres)
- Designation: State park
- Created: 11 November 2001
- Administrator: Secretaria de Estado do Meio Ambiente

The Monte Alegre State Park (Portuguese: Parque Estadual Monte Alegre) is a state park in the state of Pará, Brazil. The park covers a hilly region to the north of the Amazon River. It is known for its caves and prehistoric rock paintings, among the oldest archaeological remains in the Amazon region. Efforts have been made to get the local people involved in supporting sustainable tourism.

== Location ==
The Monte Alegre State Park is in the municipality of Monte Alegre, Pará. It has an area of 3,678 hectares (9,090 acres). The park is entirely contained within the Paytuna Environmental Protection Area. The park covers an area of mountains and valleys that contains caves with rock paintings and archaeological sites relevant to scientific studies of the occupation of the Amazon and the origin of humans in the Americas. The sulphur-breasted parakeet (Aratinga maculata) is endemic to the region.

== History ==
The park was the first conservation unit in Pará where the local community was involved in its creation. It was the outcome of studies by the Pará Institute of Economic, Social and Environmental Development (IDESP) at the end of the 1980s. The Monte Alegre State Park was created by law 6412 of 11 November 2001 with an area of 5,800 hectares (14,000 acres). The objective was to preserve the natural ecosystems, reconciling full protection of natural resources, cultural, historical and scenic beauties with use for scientific, cultural, educational, recreational and ecotourism purposes. The members of the consultative council were named by ordinance 3717 of 29 December 2009. The management plan was approved by decree 3.553 of 22 November 2010.

In November 2012 it was reported that researchers from the Museu Paraense Emílio Goeldi (MPEG) had recently found 19 sites in the lower part of the park with rock paintings and ceramic pieces. They were the work of ancient inhabitants of the region. Law 7692 of 3 January 2013 rectified the limits of the park, transferring 2,122 hectares (5,240 acres) to the Paytuna Environmental Protection Area. The park was now reduced to an area of 3,678 hectares (9,090 acres). In April 2013 the Peabiru Institute said that five initiatives had been chosen to help local women and young people provide ecotourism services. The Monte Alegre Ecotourism Agents project would be supported by TAM Linhas Aéreas.

== Attractions ==
The park is best known for the Serra da Lua, where rock paintings extend for over 200 metres (660 ft) along a wall in the Serra do Ererê. The paintings have been widely reproduced on the internet, in postcards and in tourist brochures. Most visitors only view the most accessible panel, with red and yellow figures that can be seen from the foot of the hill. The Gruta da Pedra Pintada (Painted Rock Cave) is 89 metres (292 ft) deep, 120 metres (390 ft) above sea level on the eastern flank of the Paytuna Range. It has several corridors and halls. This cave is in a region that was studied by the archaeologist Anna Curtenius Roosevelt and was widely publicized, so attracts the most tourists.

The Pedra do Mirante is a rock that may be climbed to reach a panoramic 360 degree view of the area. The Painel do Pilão has cave paintings and a beautiful view of the region. The Gruta do Pilão is a cave with paintings that is one of the oldest archaeological sites in the Amazon. The Pedra do Pilão provides a lockout over the beautiful landscape. It has a few rock paintings of low visual impact.

The Gruta Itatupaoca, or Gruta da Capela, is 56 metres (184 ft) deep, about 120 metres (390 ft) above the Amazon River in the south slope of the Ererê Range. The entrance is about 9.5 metres (31 ft) high, divided in the lower half by a rocky column. The Gruta do Miritiepé is 87 metres (285 ft) deep, 60 metres (200 ft) above the Amazon on the northwest flank of the Paytuna Range. The main gallery, which is well lit, is about 2.5 metres (8 ft 2 in) high and 2.5 metres (8 ft 2 in) wide, and 32 metres (105 ft) long. It leads to the Folhas Chamber, about 13 by 8 metres (43 by 26 ft) and 6 metres (20 ft) high. From there a passage leads to the exit hall. The Gruta do Labirinto (Labyrinth Cave) is more than 90 metres (300 ft) deep, 40 metres (130 ft) above the Amazon on the west flank of the Paytuna Range.

== Sources ==
- "Guias vão orientar turistas em sítios arqueológicos de Monte Alegre, PA", G1 Globo (in Portuguese), 21 November 2012
- Parque Estadual de Monte Alegre (in Portuguese), Ideflor-bio
- PES Monte Alegre (in Portuguese), ISA: Instituto Socioambiental
- TAM Linhas Aéreas seleciona proposta de Ecoturismo de Base Comunitária no Pará (in Portuguese), Instituto Peabiru, 15 April 2013
