= Saracá-Taquera National Forest =

National forest in Pará, Brazil

- Floresta Nacional de Saracá-Taquera
- IUCN category VI (protected area with sustainable use of natural resources)
- Location within Brazil
- Nearest city: Terra Santa, Pará
- Coordinates: 1°40′22″S 56°43′01″W
- Area: 441,282.63 hectares (1,090,433.1 acres)
- Designation: National forest
- Created: 27 December 1989

The Saracá-Taquera National Forest (Portuguese: Floresta Nacional de Saracá-Taquera) is a national forest in the state of Pará, Brazil.

== Location ==
The Saracá-Taquera National Forest is in the Amazon biome. It has an area of 441,282.63 hectares (1,090,433.1 acres). It covers parts of the municipalities of Faro, Oriximiná and Terra Santa in the state of Pará. The forest is adjacent to the Rio Trombetas Biological Reserve. It is accessed via Porto Trombetas on the left bank of the Trombetas and via Faro and Terra Santa on the Nhamundá. Altitudes are from 100 to 350 metres (330 to 1,150 ft) above sea level. Average annual rainfall is 2,141 millimetres (84.3 in). Temperatures range from 26 to 32 °C (79 to 90 °F) with an average of 27 °C (81 °F).

The national forest lies in the basins of the Trombetas and Nhamundá rivers, within the Amazon River basin. About 10% of the area is covered by plateaus with flat tops and generally steep slopes, while the remainder is slightly undulating lowlands cut by many streams and flooded when the Trombetas spreads over its banks in the rainy season. The Nhamundá River, which forms the border between the states of Pará and Amazonas, has a sandy bottom and clear waters with several waterfalls in its upper reaches. The streams in the forest that feed the Nhamundá are the Taquera, Jamari, Teófilo and Araticum. The main streams in the Trombetas basin in the national forest are the Papagaio, Água Fria, Moura, Jamari, Ajará, Terra Preta and Saracá. The river reaches its highest levels in April and May, since the rainy season usually peaks in April.

Dense rainforest covers 94.1% of the national forest. Fluvial pioneer formations cover 2.7% and 0.2% is campinarana. Areas that have suffered from human activity account for 2% of the total. Migratory birds include collared plover (Charadrius collaris), osprey (Pandion haliaetus) and large-billed tern (Phaetusa simplex). The glossy antshrike (Sakesphorus luctuosus) is endemic.

Protected areas of northern Para state. 5 - Saracá-Taquera National Forest 4 - Rio Trombetas Biological Reserve

== Conservation ==
The Saracá-Taquera National Forest was created by decree 98.704 of 27 December 1989 and is administered by the Chico Mendes Institute for Biodiversity Conservation (ICMBio). Since 2002 management of the Rio Trombetas Biological Reserve and the national forest has been combined. The management plan for the forest was approved in 2002 and allows about 154,000 hectares (380,000 acres) to be used for sustainable forestry.

The forest is classed as IUCN protected area category VI (protected area with sustainable use of natural resources) with the objective of sustainable multiple use of forest resources and scientific research, with emphasis on methods for sustainable exploitation of native forests. The area has great potential for renewable natural resources include wood, nuts and other non-wood products, and also has bauxite deposits. Two 40-year leases on a total area of 48,000 hectares (120,000 acres) were sold by auction in 2009. Bauxite ore has been extracted since 1976, and the decree that created the forest allowed this to continue. Bauxite extraction is undertaken by Mineração Rio do Norte.

== Sources ==
- Flona de Saracá-Taquera (in Portuguese), Chico Mendes Institute for Biodiversity Conservation
- FLONA de Saracá-Taquera (in Portuguese), ISA: Instituto Socioambiental
- Flona Saracá-Taquera (in Portuguese), MRN: Mineração Rio do Norte
- Floresta Nacional de Saracá-Taquera (in Portuguese), Serviço Florestal Brasileiro
- Unidade de Conservação: Floresta Nacional de Saracá-Taquera (in Portuguese), MMA: Ministério do Meio Ambiente
