= Trombetas River =

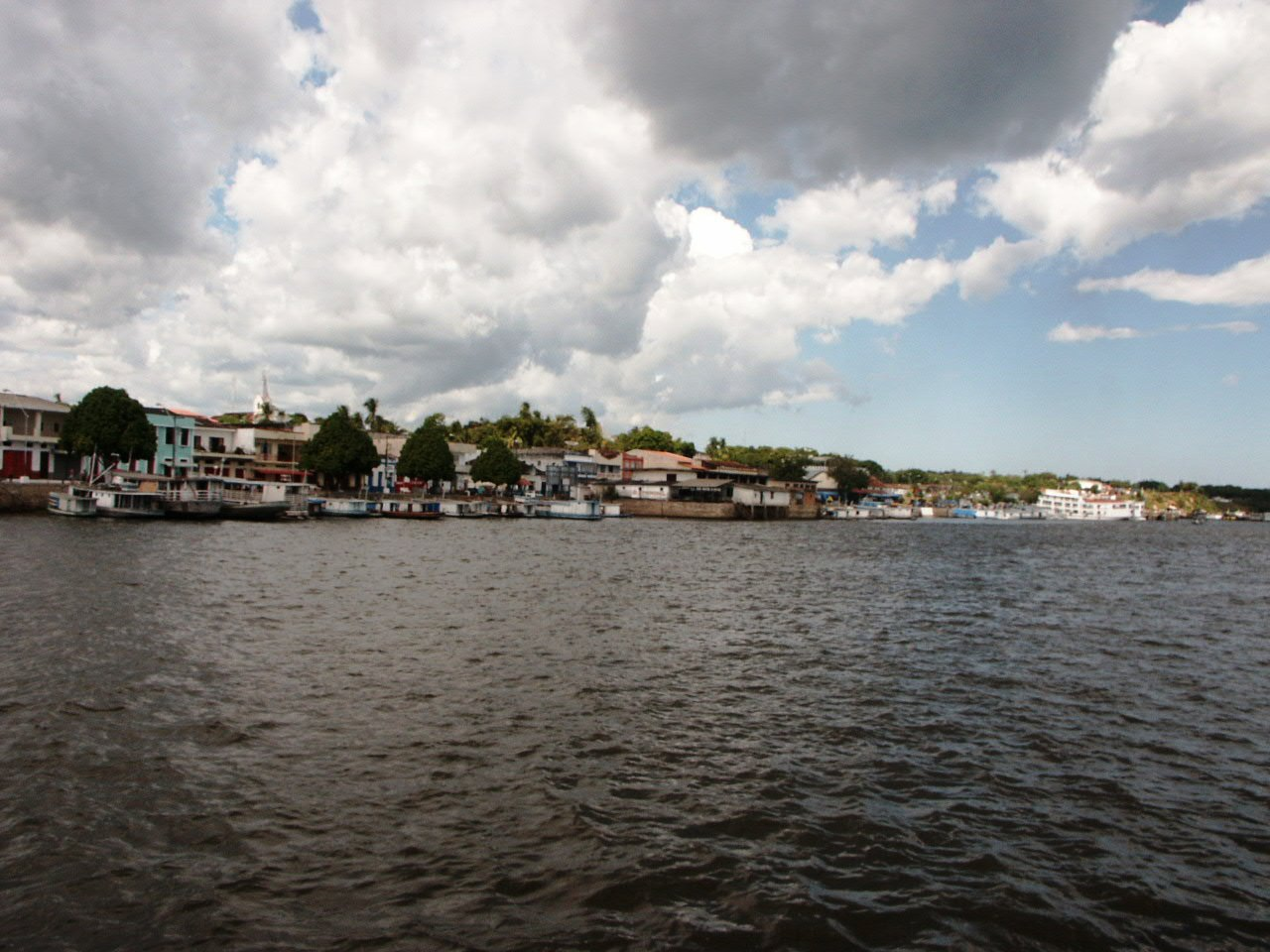
- The city of Oriximiná on the banks of the Trombetas near its confluence with the Amazon

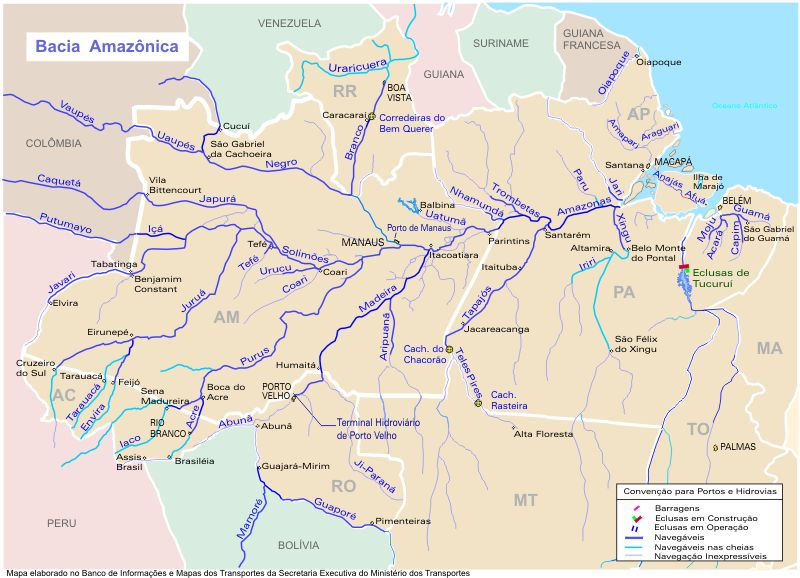
- Location of the mouth of the Trombetas River in the Amazon river watershed

Location
- Country: Brazil
- State: Pará

Physical characteristics
- Source: confluence of Anamu River and Poana River (parts of Anamu sometimes included in the Trombetas on maps, in which case Poana is a right tributary)
  - location: Pará, Brazil
- Mouth: Amazon River
  - location: Pará, Brazil
  - coordinates: 1°52′52″S 55°38′10″W
- Length: 760 km (470 mi)
- Basin size: 135,238 km^{2} (52,216 sq mi)
- Discharge
  - average: 3,437 m^{3}/s (121,400 cu ft/s)

Basin features
- Tributaries
  - left: Paru de Oeste River (Erepecuru River/Cuminá River)
  - right: Mapuera River, Cachorro River

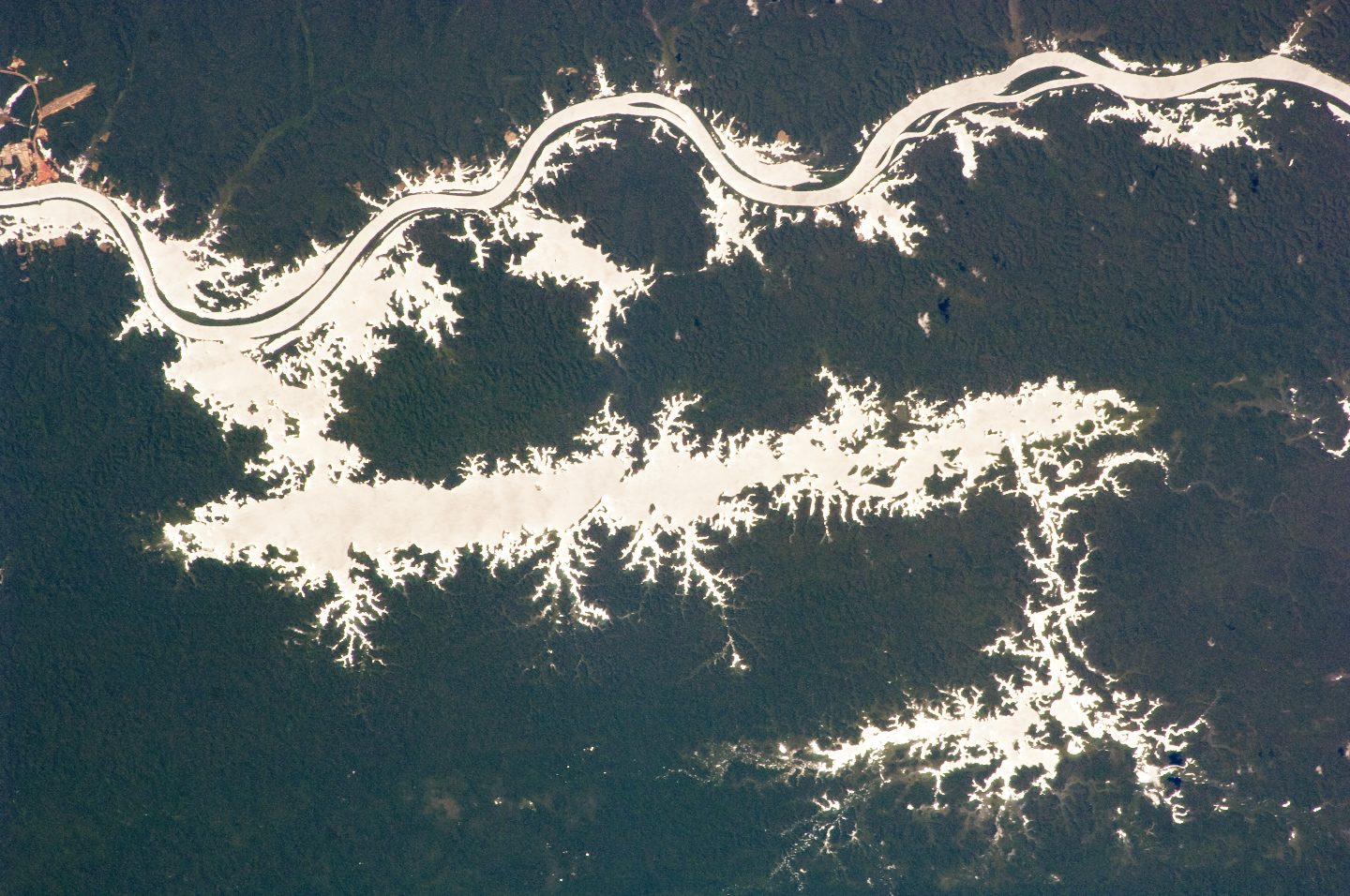
Lake Erepecu (below) runs parallel to, and is connected with, the lower Trombetas River. The unusual white colour is caused by sunglint on the water. Note: The photo is inverted. North is down, west is right

The Trombetas is a large river on the northern side of the Amazon River.

== Course ==
The Trombetas is 750 km (470 mi) long, and is navigable by 500 ton vessels for a stretch of 230 km (140 mi). The Trombetas river gives birth to very many rivers, including the Anamu river. It is formed by the junction of the Poana and Anuma rivers on the border between Brazil and Guyana. Where it meets the Paraná de Sapucuá it takes the name of lower Trombetas, and reaches up to 1.8 km (1.1 mi) in width, with the stream divided by several long and narrow islands. It runs through the municipalities of Oriximiná, Terra Santa, Óbidos and Faro. The river basin has an area of about 133,630 km^{2} (51,590 sq mi), with an intricate pattern of tributaries including the Poana, Anamu, Turuna, Inhabu, Mapuera and Paru de Oeste. In the Saracá-Taquera National Forest the main streams in the Trombetas basin are the Papagaio, Água Fria, Moura, Jamari, Ajará, Terra Preta and Saracá.

Its confluence with the Amazon is just west of the town of Óbidos, Pará in Brazil. Its sources is in the Guiana highlands, but its long course is frequently interrupted by violent currents, rocky barriers, and rapids. The inferior zone of the river, as far up as the first fall, the Porteira, has but little broken water and is low and swampy; but above the long series of cataracts and rapids the character and aspect of the valley completely change, and the climate is much better. The river is navigable for 135 mi (217 km) above its mouth. The river reaches its highest levels in April and May, since the rainy season usually peaks in April.

== Region ==
The river flows through the Uatuma-Trombetas moist forests ecoregion. The river basin lies partly within the 4,245,819 hectares (10,491,650 acres) Grão-Pará Ecological Station, the largest fully protected tropical forest conservation unit on the planet. South of the ecological station it flows through the 3,172,978 hectares (7,840,600 acres) Trombetas State Forest from north to south.

== See also ==
- Oriximiná Airport
- Porto Trombetas Airport

== Sources ==
- This article incorporates text from a publication now in the public domain: Chisholm, Hugh, ed. (1911). "Amazon § The Trombetas". Encyclopædia Britannica. Vol. 1 (11th ed.). Cambridge University Press. p. 787.
- Unidade de Conservação: Floresta Nacional de Saracá-Taquera (in Portuguese), MMA: Ministério do Meio Ambiente
