= Henri Coudreau =

French geographer and explorer

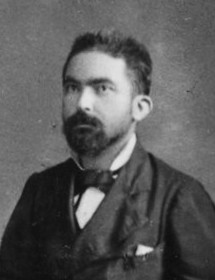
- Born: Henri Anatole Coudreau; 6 May 1859
- Died: 10 November 1899 (aged 40)

Henri Anatole Coudreau (6 May 1859 Sonnac – 10 November 1899, State of Pará, Brazil) was a French professor of history and geography and an explorer and geographer of French Guiana and the tributaries of the Amazon.

== Exploration of the Amazon ==
At the time of the "contesté franco-brésilien" boundary dispute between colonial France and Brazil, Coudreau worked in the service of Governors of the states of Brazil, mapping the Amazon's tributaries and identifying possible resources for farmers and foresters. On behalf of the State of Pará, Coudreau was charged with exploring the Trombetas river, shortly after he married Octavie Coudreau.

Their first expedition in 1899 ended tragically, as detailed in the book Voyage au Trombetas begun by Henri Coudreau, describing their voyage up the Trombetas tributary of the north bank of the Amazon. He was already sick and exhausted by the years spent in what he called the "green hell". Suffering from malarial fever, he died in his wife's arms on 10 November 1899. Aided by his traveling companions, she made a coffin from the planks of the boat and prepared a burial on a promontory overlooking lake Tapagem. After Henri Coudreau's death, Octavie continued the exploration work begun by her husband for seven years. She later wrote the final chapters of the book, following the repatriation of his remains to Angoulême in France.

== Publications ==
- Le Pays de Ouargla, (1881)
- Les richesses de la Guyane française, (1883), awarded a bronze medal at the Internationale Koloniale en Uitvoerhandel Tentoonstelling
- La France Equinoxiale, (1887)
- La Haute Guyane, (1888)
- Dix ans de Guyane, (1891)
- Les dialectes Indiens de Guyane, (1892)
- Chez nos indiens. Quatre années dans la Guyane française, Paris, (1893)
