= Cuminapanema River =

River in Pará state in Brazil

- Location within Brazil
- Native name: Rio Cuminapanema (Portuguese)

Location
- Country: Brazil

Physical characteristics
- Source
  - location: Pará state
- Mouth
  - coordinates: 1.357159°S 55.184606°W

Basin features
- River system: Curuá River

The Cuminapanema River is a river of Pará state in north-central Brazil, a tributary of the Curuá River.

The river basin lies partly within the 4,245,819 hectares (10,491,650 acres) Grão-Pará Ecological Station, the largest fully protected tropical forest conservation unit on the planet. It flows through the 3,172,978 hectares (7,840,600 acres) Trombetas State Forest from north to south. Part of the river's basin is in the Maicuru Biological Reserve. The river is also fed by streams in the 216,601 hectares (535,230 acres) Mulata National Forest, a sustainable use conservation unit created in 2001.

== See also ==
- List of rivers of Pará
