= Rio Trombetas Biological Reserve =

Biological reserve in Pará, Brazil

- Reserva Biológica do Rio Trombetas
- IUCN category Ia (strict nature reserve)
- Protected areas of north west Pará; 4. Rio Trombetas Biological Reserve

- Location within Brazil
- Nearest city: Oriximiná, Pará
- Coordinates: 1°05′02″S 56°37′59″W
- Area: 407,754 hectares (1,007,580 acres)
- Designation: Biological reserve
- Created: 21 September 1979

Rio Trombetas Biological Reserve (Portuguese: Reserva Biológica do Rio Trombetas) is a federally-administered biological reserve in the municipality of Oriximiná, Pará, Brazil. It covers a large area of Amazon biome including rainforest, wetlands and water.

== History ==
The reserve, which covers 407,754 hectares (1,007,580 acres), was created on 21 September 1979. It is managed by the Chico Mendes Institute for Biodiversity Conservation. The objective is to fully preserve the biota and other natural attributes of the reserve without human interference except for recovery of degraded ecosystems and actions to preserve the natural balance, biological diversity and natural ecological processes. A specific objective is to ensure survival of the Arrau turtle (Podocnemis expansa) and other turtles, and to preserve a sample of the Amazon ecosystem. It adjoins the Trombetas State Forest to the north, the Faro State Forest to the east and the Saracá-Taquera National Forest to the south.

== Environment ==
The reserve is in the Uatuma-Trombetas moist forests ecoregion. The landscape is rugged, with altitudes that range from 100 to 350 metres (330 to 1,150 ft). It contains exposed rock from an ancient craton and sediments from the Amazon. Temperature ranges from 26 to 32 °C (79 to 90 °F) with average temperature of 27 °C (81 °F). Annual rainfall is about 2,141 millimetres (84.3 in). 86% of the reserve is covered by upland rainforests, 6% by flooding forests and 6.5% by water. The area is drained by the Acapu River and the Arrozal, Candieiro, Mungubal and Cabeceira Grande streams. Numerous lakes in the floodplain are permanently connected to the Trombetas River, forming a large wetland.

The diverse plant species include manilkara huberi, caryocar, dipteryx odorata, chrysophyllum, goupia glabra, copaiba, bertholletia excelsa, anacardium giganteum and palms such as attalea maripa, oenocarpus bacaba and astrocaryum vulgare. Migratory bird species include osprey (pandion haliaetus), collared plover (charadrius collaris) and large-billed tern (phaetusa simplex). The glossy antshrike (sakesphorus luctuosus) is endemic.

== Status ==
The Biological Reserve is a "strict nature reserve" under IUCN protected area category Ia. Since 2002 management of the Rio Trombetas Biological Reserve and the Saracá-Taquera National Forest, which is adjacent to the south, has been combined. The conservation unit is supported by the Amazon Region Protected Areas Program. Protected species include giant anteater (myrmecophaga tridactyla), giant armadillo (priodontes maximus), giant otter (pteronura brasiliensis) and Amazonian manatee (trichechus inunguis).

== Sources ==
- FES do Trombetas (in Portuguese), ISA: Instituto Socioambiental
- FLONA de Saracá-Taquera (in Portuguese), ISA: Instituto Socioambiental
- Full list: PAs supported by ARPA, ARPA
- Reserva Biológica do Rio Trombetas (in Portuguese), Chico Mendes Institute for Biodiversity Conservation, archived from the original on 2015-10-23
- Sears, Robin, Northern South America: Northeastern Brazil, into southern Guyana and Suriname (NT0173), WWF: World Wildlife Fund
- Unidade de Conservação: Reserva Biológica do Rio Trombetas (in Portuguese), MMA: Ministério do Meio Ambiente
