= Alenquer Municipality =

Alenquer Municipality may refer to:

- Alenquer Municipality, Portugal
- Alenquer, Brazil
