= Grão-Pará Ecological Station =

- Estação Ecológica Grão-Pará
- IUCN category Ia (strict nature reserve)
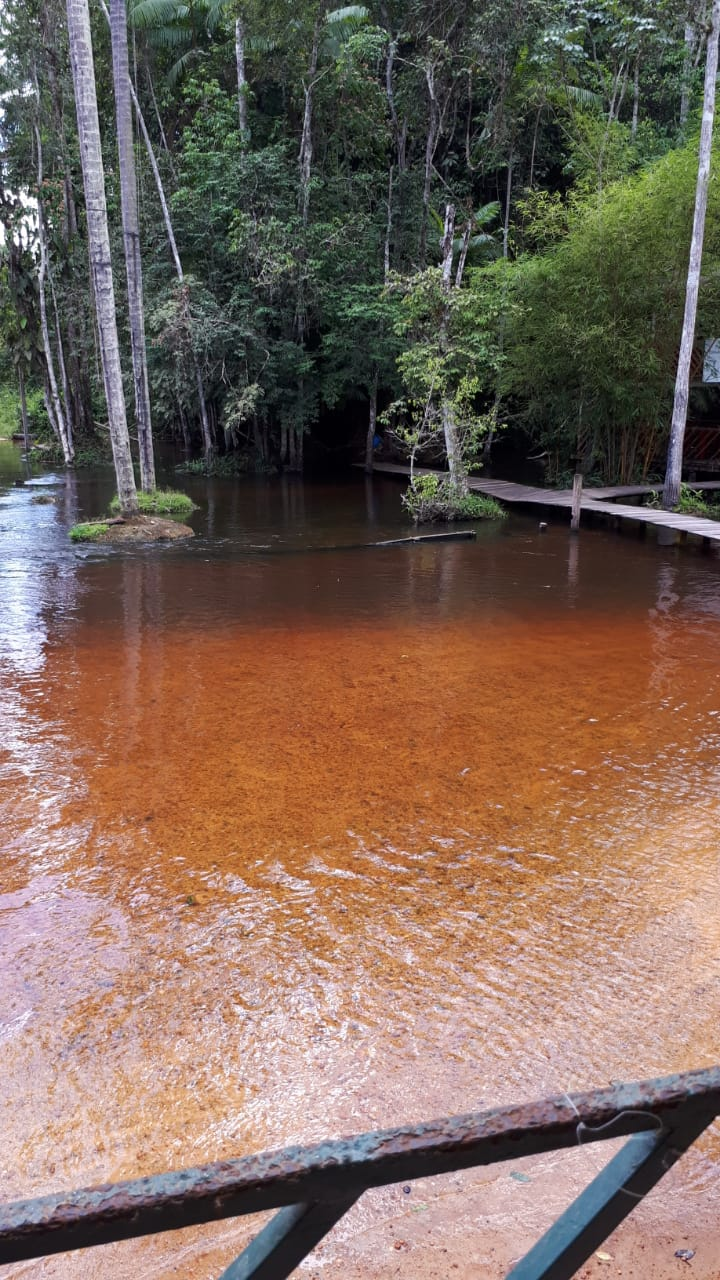

- Location within Brazil
- Nearest city: Monte Alegre, Pará
- Coordinates: 1.163°N 57.197°W
- Area: 4,245,819 hectares (10,491,650 acres)
- Designation: Ecological station
- Created: 4 December 2006
- Administrator: State of Pará

The Grão-Pará Ecological Station (Portuguese: Estação Ecológica Grão-Pará is a strictly protected ecological station in the state of Pará, Brazil. It is managed by the state of Pará. With 42,458 square kilometres (16,393 sq mi) of well-preserved Amazon rainforest, it is the largest fully protected tropical forest conservation unit in the world.

== Location ==
Protected areas of north west Pará.: 1. Grão-Pará Ecological Station

The Grão-Pará Ecological Station is on the left bank of the Amazon River in the west of the state of Pará. It contains parts of the basins of the Maicuru, Curuá, Cuminapanema, Erepecuru, Trombetas and Mapuera rivers. It has an area of 4,245,819 hectares (10,491,650 acres), which makes it the largest fully protected tropical forest conservation unit on the planet. The unit covers parts of the municipalities of Oriximiná (75.89%), Alenquer (13.31%), Óbidos (7.36%) and Monte Alegre (3.44%). Its boundaries are:

- North: Tumucumaque Mountains National Park and Guyana.
- East: Tumucumaque National Park Indian Territory, Rio Paru D'Este Indian Territory and Maicuru Biological Reserve.
- South: Trombetas-Mapuera Indian Territory, Trombetas State Forest, Zo'é Indian Territory and Paru State Forest.
- West: State of Roraima.

== History ==
The Grão-Pará Ecological Station was established by state decree 2609 of 4 December 2006, signed by the state governor Simão Jatene. The unit was announced by Jatene in a ceremony that announced nine conservation areas, mostly in northern Pará that occupy a total of about 15,000,000 hectares (37,000,000 acres). Others included the 1,200,000 hectares (3,000,000 acres) Maicuru Biological Reserve, the Paru, Trombetas, Faro and Iriri state forests and the Triunfo do Xingu Environmental Protection Area. Creation of the protected areas was expected to reduce deforestation, mining and consequent mercury contamination of water, poaching, irregular farming and other threats.

Within two months of creation of the strictly protected unit it was reported that the Rio Tinto mining company was seeking approval to have 500,000 hectares (1,200,000 acres) excluded from the unit. The miner had been prospecting for bauxite near the headwaters of the Curuá River, and thought there might be a huge deposit. It seemed unlikely that the permission would be given since this would throw into doubt the state's entire environmental plan.

In 2007, the Pará Secretary of State for the Environment signed a Term of Technical Cooperation with the Museu Paraense Emílio Goeldi, Forest Development Institute of Pará, Institute of Man and Environment, Conservation International and the German Technical Cooperation Agency. These institutions worked together to develop the management plan for the implementation of the reserve, published in 2011. The Management Plan is based on the general objectives for a conservation unit, and establishes standards for use of the area and management of natural resources, including implementation of the physical structures needed to manage the unit.

== Environment ==
The Grão-Pará Ecological Station covers dissected plateaus with altitudes from 200 to 1,000 metres (660 to 3,280 ft). Most of the region has altitudes of 250 to 450 metres (820 to 1,480 ft). The lowest areas are in the north near the Trombetas River, while the highest are in the northwest in the Serra do Acari region at 400 to 1,000 metres (1,300 to 3,300 ft) and in the southern portion at 400 to 550 metres (1,310 to 1,800 ft). The terrain is rugged, with no access roads or fully navigable rivers. The unit can be reached only by helicopter or light air plane using improvised landing strips. It is known that indigenous people access it through the Trombetas and Erepecuru river regions.

The Grão-Pará Ecological Station is in the Amazon biome. It has a tropical monsoon climate. Temperatures range from 18 to 30 °C (64 to 86 °F) and are usually between 24 and 27 °C (75 and 81 °F). Average annual rainfall is from 1,900 to 2,300 millimetres (75 to 91 in), with heaviest rains on the December–May period when monthly precipitation is 300 to 600 millimetres (12 to 24 in). Even in the driest months rainfall is above 60 millimetres (2.4 in). The unit contains parts of two sub-basins of the Amazon River, the Nhamundá-Trombetas basin and the Cuminapanema-Maicuru sub-basin. The main rivers of the unit have combined lengths of 21,800 kilometres (13,500 mi).

The unit is mostly covered with dense submontane rainforest (89.43%) or transitional forest (8.9%), with small areas of cerrado (0.79%) and dense alluvial rainforest (0.01%). Known numbers of species include 125 fish, 62 amphibians, 68 reptiles, 355 birds, 61 mammals, 125 ferns and 653 flowering plants. The natural resources are well preserved.

== Conservation ==
The Grão-Pará Ecological Station allows only indirect use of its natural resources, and has the specific purpose of conserving nature and supporting scientific research. Public visits are prohibited except for educational purposes subject to the Management Plan, and scientific research requires prior permission of SEMA/PA. It lies entirely within the Pará Northern Corridor Full Protection Zone (Zona de Proteção Integral da Calha Norte Paraense). With the other protected areas and indigenous lands in the region it connects the Central Amazon Ecological Corridor to the west with the Amapá corridor to the east. The conservation unit is supported by the Amazon Region Protected Areas Program.

== Sources ==
- Amazon Biome: protected areas: Coordinated audit, Brasília: Federal Court of Accounts of Brazil, 2014, archived from the original on 2024-07-28
- Carolina Elia (13 February 2007), Área de mineração integral (in Portuguese)
- Estação Ecológica Grão-Pará (in Portuguese), Ideflor-bio (Government of Pará), archived from the original on 2020-09-26
- Full list: PAs supported by ARPA, ARPA
- José Alberto da Silva Colares (July 2011), Plano de Manejo da Estação Ecológica do Grão-Pará: Resumo Executivo (PDF) (in Portuguese), Belém: Secretaria de Estado de Meio Ambiente (SEMA)
- Simão Jatene (4 December 2006), DECRETO ESTADUAL N° 2609 de 04 de dezembro de 2006 (PDF) (in Portuguese)
- WWF-Brasil apóia criação de novas unidades de conservação no Pará (in Portuguese), WWF-Brasil, 1 December 2006
