= Monte Alegre Airport =

Monte Alegre Airport Aeroporto de Monte Alegre
- IATA: MTE; ICAO: SNMA; LID: PA0019

Summary
- Airport type: Public
- Serves: Monte Alegre
- Time zone: BRT (UTC−03:00)
- Elevation AMSL: 99 m (325 ft)
- Coordinates: 01°59′48″S 054°04′17″W

Map
- Location in Brazil MTE (Brazil)

Runways
Direction	Length		Surface
Direction	m	ft	Surface
10/28	1,425	4,675	Asphalt
- Sources: ANAC, DECEA

Monte Alegre Airport (IATA: MTE, ICAO: SNMA), is the airport serving Monte Alegre, Brazil.

== Access ==
The airport is located 1 km (1 mi) from downtown Monte Alegre.

== See also ==
- List of airports in Brazil
