= Anna Curtenius Roosevelt =

American archaeologist (born 1946)

- Born: 1946 (age 79–80)
- Education: Foxcroft School; Stanford University; Columbia University
- Scientific career
- Fields: Archaeology
- Workplaces: University of Illinois Chicago; Field Museum of Natural History; Museum of the American Indian

Anna Curtenius Roosevelt (born 1946) is an American archaeologist and Distinguished Professor of Anthropology at the University of Illinois Chicago. She studies human evolution and long-term human-environment interaction. She is one of the leading American archeologists studying Paleoindians in the Amazon basin. Her field research has included significant findings at Marajo Island and Caverna da Pedra Pintada in Brazil. She has done additional field work in the Congo Basin. She is the great-granddaughter of United States President Theodore Roosevelt.

== Education and career ==
Roosevelt recalls that, inspired by her mother, through reading and a trip to Mesa Verde, she became interested in archaeology at the age of nine. Roosevelt graduated from Foxcroft School, an all-girls' boarding school in Virginia, in 1964. She graduated from Stanford University in 1968 with a Bachelor of Arts in History, Classics, and Anthropology. In 1977, she earned a Ph.D. degree in anthropology from Columbia University.

From 1975 to 1985, she worked as a curator at the Museum of the American Indian. Roosevelt was a guest curator at the American Museum of Natural History from 1985 to 1989. She was later a curator of archaeology at the Field Museum of Natural History. Her early field work took her to the Andes mountains of Peru, and then to Mexico and Venezuela. In 2026 she is currently a Professor of Anthropology at the University of Illinois at Chicago.

== Marajo Island ==
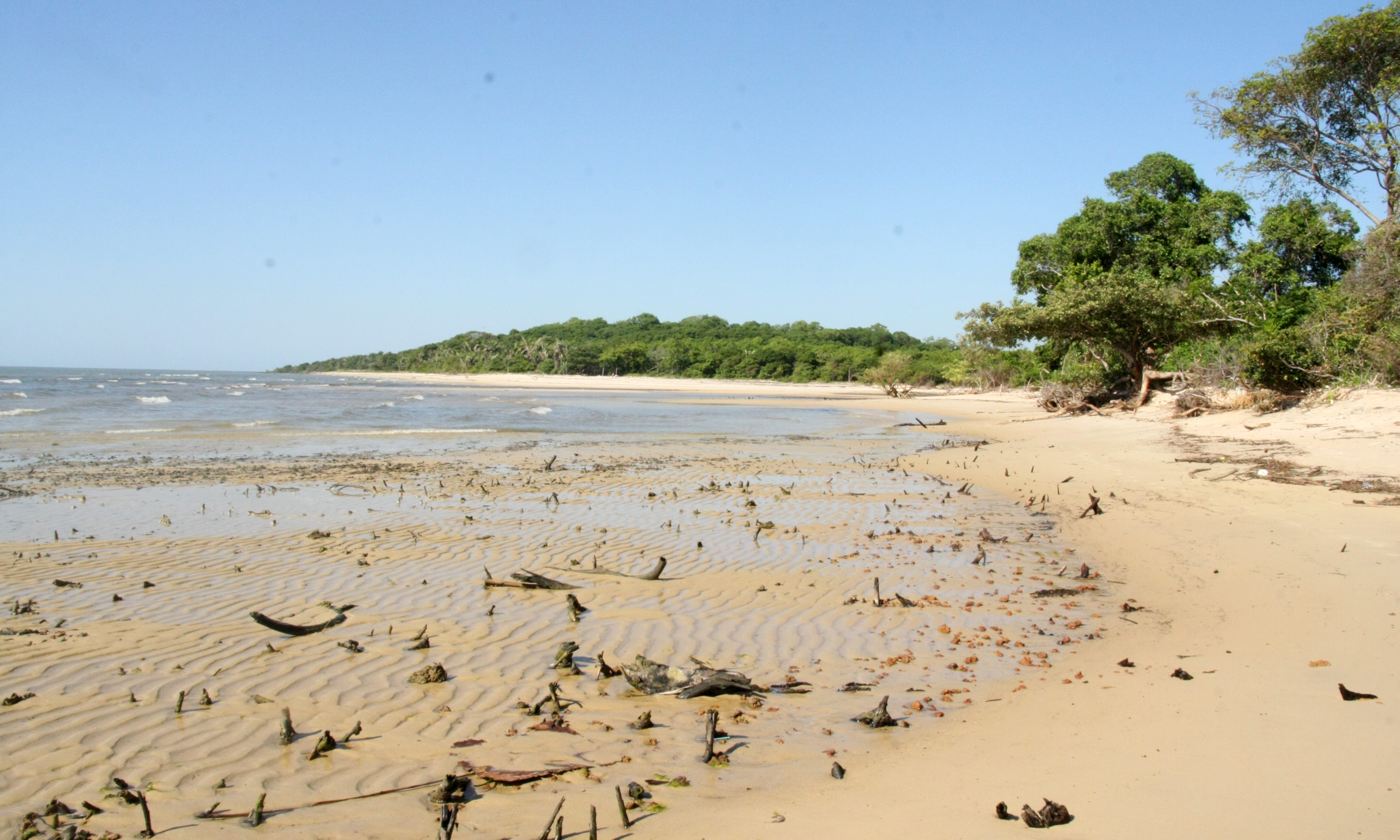
Praia de São João - Marajó Island

In 1991, Roosevelt published, Moundbuilders of the Amazon: Geophysical Archaeology on Marajo Island, Brazil, which detailed her work throughout the 1980s on pre-Columbian Marajoara culture. Her research team employed remote sensing geophysical surveys, together with excavation. The Marajo Island lies near the mouth of the Amazon River and contains evidence of pre-Columbian settlement.

In this work, Roosevelt challenged the theory that the pre-Columbian Amazon was a "counterfeit paradise" unable to sustain increasingly complex human culture. Roosevelt posited that this pre-Columbian society was "one of the outstanding indigenous cultural achievements," with a high population and territory, intensive subsistence agriculture, as well as public works. These findings and arguments have led to continuing debates in South American archaeology and anthropology. Meanwhile, they have led others to follow up and build upon her work.

== Painted Rock Cave ==
From 1990 to 1992, Roosevelt led the excavation of the Painted Rock Cave (Caverna da Pedra Pintada) near Monte Alegre in the State of Pará, Brazil. The Monte Alegre rock art contains many examples of ancient rock paintings, including handprints, as well as human and animal figures and geometrics. Dating of these paintings suggests they are among the oldest art in the Western Hemisphere. Roosevelt's investigation found evidence for human habitation in the Amazon much older than previously known, perhaps twice as old.

Over a 1000-year period, about 10,000-11,000 years ago, humans used the cave and left behind unique projectile points, as well as evidence that they had transported plant seeds from far away to the site. They lived in a different way from the cultures of the earliest-known, Western Hemisphere big-game-hunters, relying instead on the rivers and forest. Also suggesting a later human reoccupation at the site and along the nearby riverbank was evidence of 7,500-year-old pottery, which would make it the oldest, or among the oldest pottery found in the Americas. Roosevelt's findings suggested that the study of migration of humans into the Americas, as well as the development of civilization in the Amazon, needed to be revisited.

== Current ==
Roosevelt continues field work at various sites in Brazil, most recently at underwater sites in the middle Xingu, to look at the activities of Paleoindians in the interfluves of Amazonia. In addition, she has expanded her research focus to the African Congo Basin. She has carried out human ecological survey in several countries, including Gabon, Republic of Congo, Democratic Republic of Congo, and Rwanda. Her archaeological work in the Congo basin has centered on preceramic sites in Bayanga in the southwestern Central African Republic.

== Awards ==
Roosevelt has been elected a fellow of the American Academy of Arts and Sciences and the Sigma Chi Research Honor Society. She has been awarded the Explorers Medal and the Society of Woman Geographers' Gold Medal. Brazil has awarded her the Order of Rio Branco and the Bettendorf Medal. In 1988, she received a five-year fellowship from the MacArthur Fellows Program. She has received honorary doctorates from Mount Holyoke and Northeastern University. In 2012 She received the University Scholar and Distinguished Professor awards from University of Illinois at Chicago. Her research has been funded by grants from the National Science Foundation, the National Endowment for the Humanities, the National Endowment for the Arts, the Fulbright Commission, the Wenner-Gren Foundation, and the University of Illinois.

== Family ==
She is a daughter of Quentin Roosevelt II, and Frances Blanche Webb, and granddaughter of Gen. Theodore Roosevelt Jr. Her great grandfather was United States President Theodore Roosevelt. Her sisters are Susan Roosevelt Weld, and Alexandra Roosevelt Dworkin.

== Works ==
- Os Warao do Delta do Orinoco: Uma cultura de palafiteiros do Orinoco. In O Papel do Atlantico no Povoamento Indigena da America do Sul, edited by A. C. Roosevelt, A. Guida Navarro, and G. Peretti Wagner, a special issue of Tessituras: Revista de Antropologia e Arqueologia 10(1): 455-498. (2022b Translation of Roosevelt 2019 by Alexandre Guida Navarro)
- Ancient Civilizations of the Amazon. First author with Alexandre Guida Navarro. Sao Luis, Maranhao: Universidade Federal do Maranhao. (2021)
- Amazon paleoenvironment: The death of the refugium hypotheseis has not been exaggerated. In Memoria, Cultura Material, e Sensibilidade: Estudos em Homenagem a Pedro Paulo Funare, edited by Alexandre Guida Navarro and Raquel dos Santos Funare. Jundiai, BR: Paco Editorial. Pp. 139-1`81. (2021)
- Culpability for violence in the Congo: Lessons from the crisis of 1960-1965. In Human Conflict from Neanderthals to the Samburu: A Crosscultural Study of Webs of Violence, edited by William P. Kiblinger. New York: Springer. Pp. 105-174. (2020)
- The Warao of the Orinoco delta: A stilt-village culture. In A Civilizacao Lacustre de a Baixada Maranhense: Da Prehistorica dos Campos Inundaveis aos Dias Atuais, edited by Alexandre Guida Navarro. Sao Luis, Maranhao: Universidade Federal do Maranhao. Pp. 231-2996. (2019)
- Paleoindian solar and stellar pictographic trail in the MOnte Alegre hills of Brazil: Implications for pioneering new landscapes. Journal of Anthropology and Archaeology 5(2): 1-17. (second author with C. S. Davis and W. Barnett.) (2017)
- Method and theory of early farming: The Orinoco and Caribbean coasts of South America. Earth Science Research 6(1): 1-24. (2016)
- The Great Anaconda and the Amazon women: A powerful and dangerous ancestral spirit from creation time to today. In Colocataires d'Amazonie: Hommes, Animaux, et Plantes de Part et d'Autre de l'Atlantique, edited by Egle Barone Visigali. Ibis Rouge: Cayenne. Pp. 39-56. (2014)
- "Prehistory of Amazonia." In Cambridge World Prehistory, edited by Colin Renfrew and Paul Bahn. Cambridge University Press, Cambridge, UK. (2013)
- "Behind the Veil: Culpability in the assassination of Patrice Lumumba." Congonova 4:1-11. Montreal, CN. (2011)
- "Human rights and the CIA: The case of the assassination of Patrice Lumumba." Fifth International Conference on the Ethics of National Security Intelligence, Program and Abstracts. Georgetown University, Washington, DC. pp. 20–21. (2010)
- Amaz'homme: Sciences de l'Homme Sciences de la Nature en Amazonie, second editor with E. Barone Visigali. Ibis Rouge. Cayenne, FG. (2010)
- Early hunter-gatherers in the terra firme rainforest: Stemmed projectile points from the Curua goldmines, co-authored with John E. Douglas, Anderson Marcio Amaral, Maura Imazio da Silveira, Carlos Palheta Barbosa, Mauro Barreto, and Wanderley Souza da Silva. Amazonica 1(2): 422-483. (2009)
- "Geophysical Archaeology in the Lower Amazon: A Research Strategy." In Remote Sensing in Archaeology, edited by Farouk El Baz and James R. Wiseman. New York: Springer. pp. 435–467. (2007)
- "Ecology in Human Evolution: Origins of the Species and of Complex Societies". In A Catalyst for Ideas:Anthropological Archaeology and the Legacy of Douglas Schwartz, edited by V. Scarborough. Santa Fe: School of American Research. pp. 169–208. (2005)
- Geoarchaeological Exploration of Guajara, A Prehistoric Earth Mound in Brazil, with B.W. Bevan. Geoarchaeology 18(3): 287-331. (2003)
- "Migrations and Adaptations of the First Americans: Clovis and Pre-Clovis Viewed from South America", with John Douglas and Linda Brown. In The First Americans: The Pleistocene Colonization of the New World, edited by N. Jablonski. Berkeley: University of California Press. Pp. 159–236. (2002)
- "Gender in Human Nature: Sociobiology Revisited and Revised." In In Pursuit of Gender: Worldwide Archaeological Approaches, edited by S.M. Nelson and M. Rosen-Ayalon. Walnut Creek, CA: Altamira Press. Pp. 355–376. (2002)
- "Mound-building Societies of the Amazon and Orinoco." In Archaeologia de las Tierras Bajas, edited by A. Duran Coirolo. Montevideo: Ministerio de Educacion, Uruguay. (2000)
- "The Lower Amazon: A Dynamic Human Habitat." In Imperfect Balance: Landscape Transformations in the Precolumbian Americas, edited by D.L. Lentz. New York: Columbia University Press. Pp 455–491. (2000)
- "The Development of Prehistoric Complex Societies : Amazonia, a Tropical Forest." In Complex Polities in the Ancient Tropical World, edited by E.A. Bacus, L.J. Lucero, and J. Allen. Arlington: American Anthropological Association. Pp 13–34. (1999)
- "The Maritime, Highland, Forest Dynamic and the Origins of Complex Culture." In South America, edited by Frank Salomon and Stuart Schwartz. New York: Cambridge University Press. Pp 264–369.(1999)
- "O Povoamento das Americas: O Panorama Brasileiro." In Pre-historia da Terra Brasilis. Universidade Federal de Rio de Janeiro. Pp 35–50. (1999)
- "Twelve Thousand Years of Human-Environment Interaction in the Amazon Floodplain." Advances in Economic Botany, Vol. 13. New York Botanical Garden. Pp 371–392. (1999)
- "Luminescence Dates for the Paleoindian Site of Pedra Pintada, Brazil," co-authored with M. Michab, J.K. Feathers, J.-L. Joron, N. Mercier, M. Selos, H. Valladas, and J.-L. Reyss. Quaternary Geochronology 17(11): 1041-1046. (1998)
- "Paleoindian Cave Dwellers in the Amazon: The Peopling of the Americas," co-authored with M. Lima Costa, C. Lopes Machado, M. Michab, N. Mercier, H. Valladas, J. Feathers, W. Barnett, M. Imazio da Silveira, A. Henderson, J. Sliva, B. Chernoff, D. Reese, J.A. Holman, N. Toth, and K. Schick. Science 272: 373-384. (1996)
- "Early Pottery in the Amazon: Twenty Years of Scholarly Obscurity." In The Emergence of Pottery: Technology and Innovation in Ancient Societies, edited by W. Barnett and J. Hoopes. Smithsonian Institution Press. Pp 115–131. (1995)
- "The Rise and Fall of the Amazon Chiefdoms." L'Homme 33 (126-128): 255-284. (1993)
- Moundbuilders of the Amazon. Academic Press, ISBN 978-0-12-595348-1 (1991)
