= Delival Nobre =

Brazilian sports shooter

Personal information
- Full name: Delival da Fonseca Nobre
- Born: 27 September 1948 (age 77) Alenquer, Brazil

Sport
- Sport: Sports shooting

Delival da Fonseca Nobre (born 27 September 1948) is a Brazilian sports shooter. He competed at the 1976 Summer Olympics, the 1984 Summer Olympics and the 1988 Summer Olympics.
