= Óbidos Airport =

Óbidos Airport Aeroporto de Óbidos
- IATA: OBI; ICAO: SNTI; LID: PA0016

Summary
- Airport type: Public
- Serves: Óbidos
- Time zone: BRT (UTC−03:00)
- Elevation AMSL: 100 m (330 ft)
- Coordinates: 01°52′05″S 055°30′52″W

Map
- Location in Brazil OBI (Brazil)

Runways
Direction	Length		Surface
Direction	m	ft	Surface
10/28	1,520	4,987	Asphalt
- Sources: ANAC, DECEA

Óbidos Airport (IATA: OBI, ICAO: SNTI), is the airport serving Óbidos, Brazil.

== Airlines and destinations ==
No scheduled flights operate at this airport.

== Access ==
The airport is located 5 km (3 mi) from downtown Óbidos.

== See also ==
- List of airports in Brazil
