= Maicuru Biological Reserve =

Biological reserve in Pará, Brazil

- Reserva Biológica Maicuru
- IUCN category Ia (strict nature reserve)
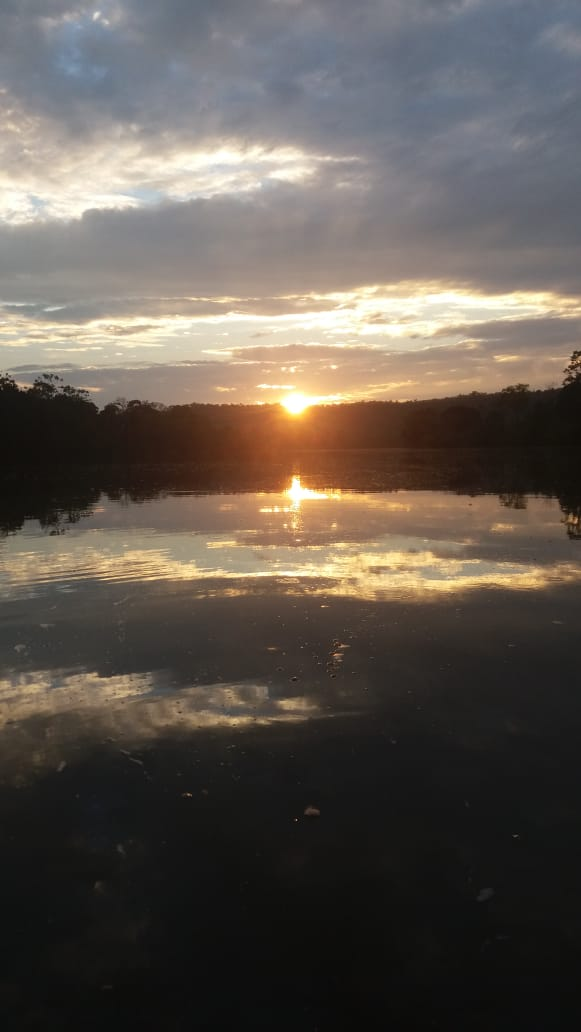
- Protected areas of north west Pará.: 7. Maicuru Biological Reserve

- Location within Brazil
- Nearest city: Oriximiná, Pará
- Coordinates: 1°16′41″N 54°04′40″W
- Area: 1,151,761 hectares (2,846,060 acres)
- Designation: Biological reserve
- Created: 4 December 2006
- Administrator: Secretaria de Estado de Meio Ambiente, Belém

The Maicuru Biological Reserve (Portuguese: Reserva Biológica Maicuru), is a strictly protected biological reserve in the state of Pará, Brazil. It covers 11,518 square kilometres (4,447 sq mi) of Amazon rainforest.

== Location ==
The reserve lies between the Maicuru and Jari rivers on the border between the states of Pará and Amapá. It includes parts of the basins of the Maicuru, Paru and Jari rivers. It covers 1,151,761 hectares (2,846,060 acres) of Amazon biome. The park is mostly within the municipality of Almeirim (94.49%) with a small part in the municipality of Monte Alegre (5.51%). It is part of the mosaic of protected areas known as the Calha Norte do rio Amazonas. It adjoins the Tumucumaque Indigenous Park, Rio Paru d'Este Indigenous Territory, Tumucumaque Mountains National Park and Paru State Forest.

Almost all the reserve is in the Paru-Jari basin formed by the Itapecuru, Ipitinga, Careparu, Paru and Jarí rivers. The south of the reserve is in the Cuminapanema-Maicuru basin, formed by the Maicurú, Curuá, Mamiá, Cuminapanema and Jauaru rivers. The total length of water courses in the reserve is about 3,700 kilometres (2,300 mi). The reserve is accessible only by small aeroplane through landing strips in four mining areas in the south-central portion and one in the north-central portion.

== History ==
The reserve was created by state decree 2610 of 4 December 2006 with the objectives of preserving the natural environment and ecosystem, supporting scientific research and supporting environmental education. The conservation unit is fully protected. As a biological reserve the purpose is to provide full protection without human interference and allow only indirect use of the natural resources. Public access is prohibited except for educational purposes as defined by the management plan, and scientific research requires prior approval by the Pará Secretary of State for the Environment (SEMA/PA). The reserve is in the Center of Guiana Endemism, which spans parts of Brazil, Venezuela, Guyana, French Guiana and Suriname. It may be considered a "mega reserve", aiming to protect a complete sample of species with the space needed to perpetuate themselves over the generations.

The Management Plan was prepared by Conservation International with the assistance of the Museu Paraense Emílio Goeldi and the Institute of Man and Environment in the Amazon, and technical analysis from SEMA. The plan describes the physical, biological and socio-economic aspects of the landscape, and provides a full plan for managing it. The management plan was published and took effect in 2011. The management councils of the Maicuru Biological Reserve and the Grão Pará Ecological Station were formed on 6–7 March 2013. The conservation unit is supported by the Amazon Region Protected Areas Program.

== Environment ==
The reserve has a tropical monsoon climate, with temperature between 18 and 30 °C (64 and 86 °F) most of the year, high humidity and high rainfall. Average annual rainfall is 2,300 to 2,800 millimetres (91 to 110 in), with a rainy season from December to June. From July to November monthly rainfall is 50 to 150 millimetres (2.0 to 5.9 in).

The reserve is almost all covered by dense submontane rainforest (98.24%), with some transition forest (0.96%) and Cerrado (0.04%). There is no record of human pressure in 98.5% of the reserve, but an area covering 1.5% of the reserve hot spots indicate medium pressure. The reserve contains various endemic and endangered species of flora and fauna. 88 species of fish have been recorded, 31 amphibians, 34 reptiles, 302 birds including the vulnerable crested eagle (Morphnus guianensis) and 33 mammals including the endangered jaguar (Panthera onca), cougar (Puma concolor) and giant anteater (Myrmecophaga tridactyla). 88 species of ferns have been recorded and 306 of flowering plants.

== Sources ==
- Full list: PAs supported by ARPA, ARPA
- Maicuru Reserva Biológica (in Portuguese), ISA: Instituto Socioambiental
- Plano de Manejo da Reserva Biológica Maicuru Resumo Executivo (PDF), Belém: SEMA: Secretaria de Estado de Meio Ambiente, May 2011, archived from the original (PDF) on 2016-10-20
- Reserva Biológica Maicuru (in Portuguese), Ideflor-bio
- "Reserva Biológica Estadual Maicuru", Via Rural (in Portuguese), archived from the original on May 30, 2016
- Reunião define conselhos da Esec Grão Pará e Rebio Maicuru (in Portuguese), CI: Conservação Internacional, 8 March 2013
- "Sema aprova Palno de Manejo da Reserva Biológica Maicuru", TCN News (in Portuguese), Tribuna da Calha Norte, 13 September 2011, archived from the original on 5 June 2016
