= Sobral Santos II =

Amazon river ferry that sank in 1981

- Date: Saturday 19 September 1981
- Time: 03h30
- Location: Amazon River, Brazil
- Participants: c. 500
- Outcome: Boat sank, 178 rescued
- Deaths: c. 300+
- Missing: c. 100+
- Survivors: 178

The Sobral Santos II was a ferry which operated on the Amazon River. On Saturday, September 19, 1981, it was making its weekly trip between Santarém and Manaus when it sank in Óbidos harbour. The boat was overcrowded, and it is assumed that over 300 people died in the disaster, with hundreds of bodies and body parts never identified. Of 500 people estimated to have been aboard, at least 178 had survived as reported by the Captain, Elio Palhares, that day.

In 2014, British angler Jeremy Wade went to Óbidos to investigate the role that local fish species may have played in the loss of life during this disaster; his findings were documented in the River Monsters episode entitled "Amazon Titanic" After investigating numerous possibilities, including botos (river dolphins), caimans, and piranha, Wade concluded that the culprits were likely hordes of piraiba and redtail coda rossa catfish, drawn by chum from nearby fish processing operations, probably joined by the multiple species of piranha and other small carnivorous fish. He hypothesized that the large redtails and piraiba pulled the struggling victims underwater, where they drowned.

One man, soon after the ship had sunk, volunteered to dive down and help explain what went wrong. After a few short minutes, the diver re-emerged and said “There’s definitely something down there, the movement of the water…” He refused to go back down.

When the ship was retrieved, there were bodies with chunks of missing flesh, and only the hands seemed to be untouched.
