= Porto Trombetas Airport =

Porto Trombetas Airport Aeroporto de Porto Trombetas
- IATA: TMT; ICAO: SBTB; LID: PA0012

Summary
- Airport type: Public
- Owner/Operator: Mineração Rio do Norte
- Serves: Porto Trombetas (Oriximiná)
- Time zone: BRT (UTC−03:00)
- Elevation AMSL: 51 m (167 ft)
- Coordinates: 01°29′23″S 056°23′49″W

Map
- Location in Brazil TMT (Brazil)

Runways
Direction	Length		Surface
Direction	m	ft	Surface
09/27	1,600	5,249	Asphalt
- Sources: ANAC, DECEA

Porto Trombetas Airport (IATA: TMT, ICAO: SBTB) is the airport serving the district of Porto Trombetas in Oriximiná, Brazil.

It is operated by the mining company Mineração Rio do Norte.

== Airlines and destinations ==
Airlines	Destinations
Azul Brazilian Airlines	Manaus, Santarém

== Accidents and incidents ==
- 10 September 2022: a Piquiatuba Táxi Aéreo Cessna 208 Grand Caravan registration PT-MES, flying from Oriximiná to an indigenous village attempted a forced landing at Porto Trombetas Airport due to a loss of engine power, but it was unable to reach the airfield. It crashed at an açaí palm plantation. One pilot out of the five occupants perished.

== Access ==
The airport is located 4 km (2 mi) from downtown Porto Trombetas and 70 km (43 mi) from downtown Oriximiná.

== See also ==
- List of airports in Brazil
