= Lago Grande de Monte Alegre =

Lake in Pará, Brazil

Coordinates: 2°16′S 54°16′W

- Location within Brazil
- Interactive map of Lago Grande de Monte Alegre
- Location: Monte Alegre, Pará, Brazil
- Surface area: 576 km^{2} (222 sq mi)

Lago Grande de Monte Alegre is a floodplain lake located in the state of Pará, municipality Monte Alegre, Northern Brazil, Mesorregião do Baixo Amazonas, Microrregião de Santarém, 1,400 km north of the country's federal capital Brasília. Estimates of the area occupied by the lake vary between 300 km^{2} (Loureiro & Loureiro 1987) and 576 km^{2} (Vieira & Hartmann 1989). Both of these values may be correct, depending on the time of the year measurements were taken.
