= Alenquer Airport =

Alenquer Airport Aeroporto de Alenquer
- IATA: ALT; ICAO: SDWQ; LID: PA0027

Summary
- Airport type: Public
- Serves: Alenquer
- Time zone: BRT (UTC−03:00)
- Elevation AMSL: 31 m (102 ft)
- Coordinates: 01°55′01″S 054°43′22″W

Map
- Location in Brazil ALT (Brazil)

Runways
Direction	Length		Surface
Direction	m	ft	Surface
10/28	1,000	3,281	Asphalt
- Sources: ANAC, DECEA

Alenquer Airport (IATA: ALT, ICAO: SDWQ), is the airport serving Alenquer, Brazil.

== Access ==
The airport is located 5 km (3 mi) from downtown Alenquer.

== See also ==
- List of airports in Brazil
