= Mulata National Forest =

National forest in Brazil

- Floresta Nacional de Mulata
- IUCN category VI (protected area with sustainable use of natural resources)
- Location within Brazil
- Nearest city: Alenquer, Pará
- Coordinates: 1°07′09″S 54°55′42″W
- Area: 216,601.41 hectares (535,233.7 acres)
- Designation: National forest
- Created: 1 August 2001
- Administrator: Chico Mendes Institute for Biodiversity Conservation

Mulata National Forest (Portuguese: Floresta Nacional de Mulata) is a national forest in the state of Pará, Brazil.

== Location ==
The Mulata National Forest has an area of 216,601.41 hectares (535,233.7 acres). It is almost equally divided between the municipalities of Alenquer (49.7%) and Monte Alegre (50.3%) in the state of Pará. It adjoins the Trombetas State Forest to the west and the Paru State Forest to the north. It lies in the north of the Amazon depression in the marginal plateau of the Amazon River. Altitudes range from 78 to 732 metres (256 to 2,402 ft). It is drained by the Maicuru, Curuá and Cuminapanema rivers.

The Mulata National Forest is in the Amazon biome. Average annual rainfall is 1,700 millimetres (67 in). Temperatures range from 26 to 28 °C (79 to 82 °F) and average 26 °C (79 °F). Coverage is 53% dense rainforest, 5% open rainforest, and 41% savannah-forest contact. The savannah is in the south.

== Conservation ==
Protected areas of northern Para state. 8 - Mulata National Forest

The Mulata National Forest was created on 1 August 2001 and is administered by the Chico Mendes Institute for Biodiversity Conservation (ICMBio). The occupants of the settlement areas created by the Instituto Nacional de Colonização e Reforma Agrária in 1965 were to receive compensation for their land. The advisory council was created on 30 March 2011. It is classed as IUCN protected area category VI (protected area with sustainable use of natural resources) with the objective of sustainable multiple use of forest resources and scientific research, with emphasis on methods for sustainable exploitation of native forests. Protected species include the Amazonian manatee (Trichechus inunguis).

In September 2015 ICMBio reported that their agents and the federal and military police had found about 6 kilometres (3.7 mi) of logging roads opened in the national forest and dozens of felled trees, mostly the very valuable ipê amarelo of the Tabebuia genus. They destroyed the trees and a tractor found in the forest.

== Sources ==
- Flona de Mulata (in Portuguese), Chico Mendes Institute for Biodiversity Conservation
- FLONA de Mulata (in Portuguese), ISA: Instituto Socioambiental
- Floresta paraense combate retirada ilegal de madeira (in Portuguese), ICMBio, 29 September 2015 – via ISA: FLONA de Mulata - Noticias
- Unidade de Conservação: Floresta Nacional de Mulata (in Portuguese), MMA: Ministério do Meio Ambiente
