= Caverna da Pedra Pintada =

- archaeological site
- Location of State of Pará in Brazil (blue area indicates water)
- State: Pará State
- Mesoregion: Baixo Amazonas Mesoregion
- Microregion: Santarém Microregion

Caverna da Pedra Pintada (Painted Rock Cave), is an archaeological site in northern Brazil with evidence of human presence dating ca. 11,200 years ago.

This find has challenged previous thinking about patterns of human settlement in South America. Anna C. Roosevelt, an American archaeologist and primary researcher here since 1990, believes that findings from the cave show there were Paleoindians this far south and with an independent culture that existed at the same time as other early Native Americans were active on the Great Plains of North America. Formerly, researchers believed that Amazonian settlements arose later than those in the Andes, and were developed by migrants from the highlands.

== Location ==
Caverna da Pedra Pintada is located near the town of Monte Alegre, in the Amazon River Basin in Pará state in northern Brazil. It is the main attraction of the 3,678 hectares (9,090 acres) Monte Alegre State Park, created in 2001.

== Rediscovery and excavations ==
Anna C. Roosevelt rediscovered the cave and excavated it extensively from 1990 to 1992. The excavations were supported by the Field Museum and the University of Illinois, Chicago, with which she is affiliated. The lowest levels of the cave were radiocarbon dated and thermoluminescence dated to ca. 11,200 to 10,000 years ago. The early dates of these finds have affected the interpretation of human settlement in the Amazon Basin. Roosevelt believes that the cave's evidence supports a theory that the Amazon Basin was settled much earlier than formerly believed.

== Findings ==
The early dates of human presence at the cave show that humans did not exclusively migrate from North America down to the Andes in South America, which some archaeologists had previously believed.

"We found strong evidence that a culture quite distinct from the North American Paleoindian culture, but contemporary with it, existed more than 5,000 miles to the south", Anna Roosevelt has said. "Paleoindians traveled far and adapted to a diverse range of habitats. The existence of distinct cultures east of the Andes suggests that North American big-game hunters were not the sole source of migration into South America."

The lowest levels of the cave yield charred floral and faunal remains and stone tools, including spear points, suggesting that the earliest visitors were hunter-gatherers in the humid tropical environment. These Paleoindians used the cave frequently over a span of 1,200 years, leaving remains of fruits, and seeds, including Brazil nuts; as well as fish, birds, reptiles, shellfish, and amphibians.

30,000 lithic specimens have been excavated from the cave.

=== Paintings ===
Lumps of raw pigment and drops of paint from the cave paintings have been dated. The paintings are considered to be the earliest ones in South America and the earliest known cave paintings in the Americas as a whole. Images include a stick figure of a woman giving birth, geometric designs, and hand stencils in browns, reds, and yellows.

== See also ==
- Pedra Furada sites
- Toca da Tira Peia
- Timeline of Amazon history
- Timeline of Native American art history
