= Curuá River (Amazon River tributary) =

River in Pará state, Brazil

- Curuá River (Amazon River tributary) (Brazil)
- Native name: Rio Curuá (Portuguese)

Location
- Country: Brazil

Physical characteristics
- Source
  - location: Pará state
  - coordinates: 1.921326°S 55.108533°W
- Discharge
  - average: 550 m^{3}/s (19,000 cu ft/s)

The Curuá River is a river of Pará state in north-central Brazil.

The river basin lies partly within the 4,245,819 hectares (10,491,650 acres) Grão-Pará Ecological Station, the largest fully protected tropical forest conservation unit on the planet. Part of the river's basin is in the Maicuru Biological Reserve. The river is also fed by streams in the 216,601 hectares (535,230 acres) Mulata National Forest, a sustainable use conservation unit created in 2001.

== See also ==
- List of rivers of Pará
