= Óbidos, Pará =

Municipality in Pará, Brazil

Coordinates: 1°54′S 55°31′W

Óbidos
- Municipio
- The Municipality of Óbidos
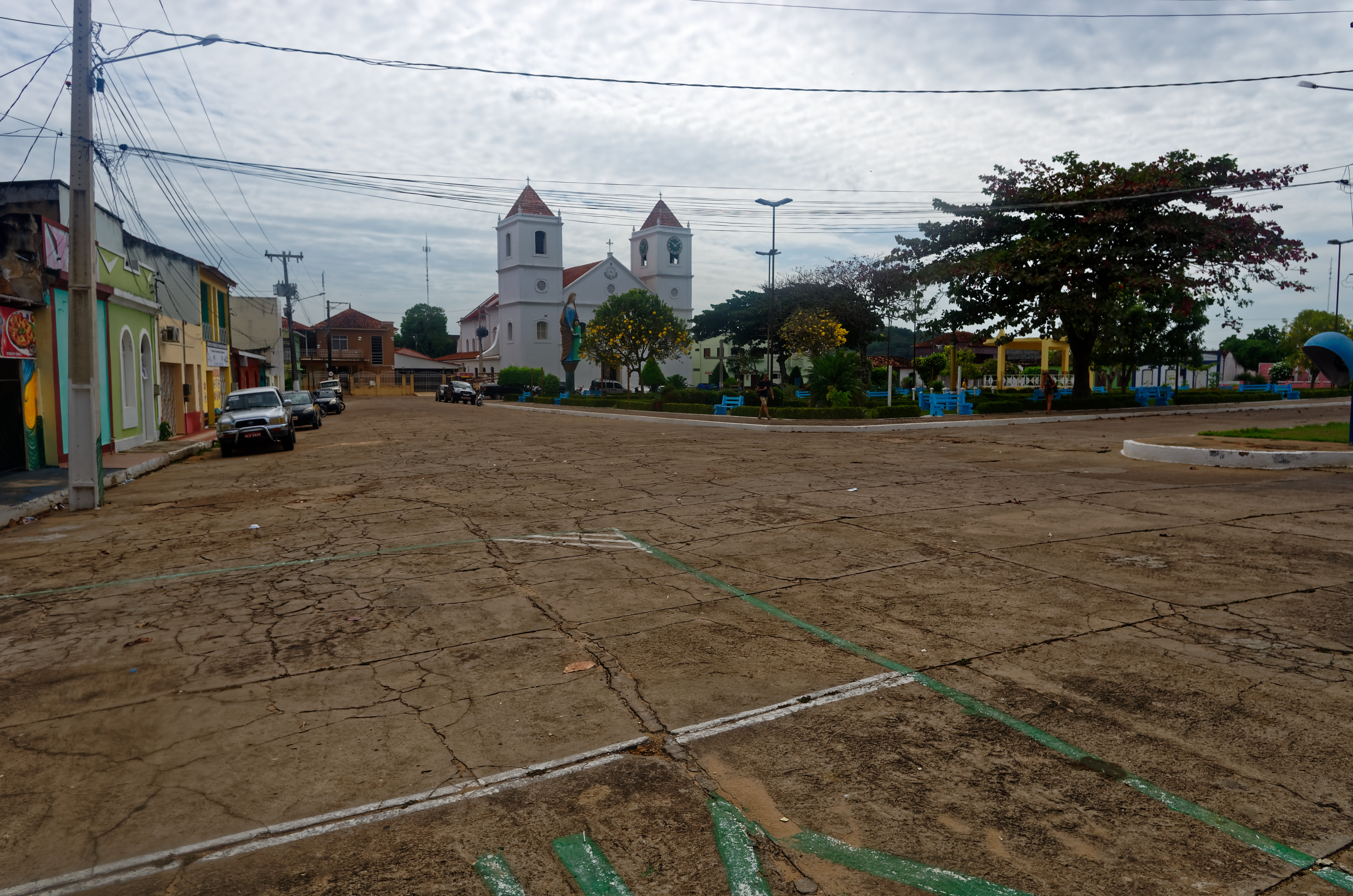

- Flag Coat of arms

- Location in the State of Pará
- Country: Brazil
- Region: North
- State: Pará
- Founded: September 23, 1867

Government
  - Mayor: Jaime Barbosa da Silva (PTB)

Area
  - Total: 28,021.287 km^{2} (10,819.079 sq mi)

Population (2020)
  - Total: 52,306
  - Density: 1.76/km^{2} (4.6/sq mi)
- Time zone: UTC−3 (BRT)

Óbidos is a municipality in Pará, Brazil located at the narrowest and swiftest part of the Amazon River. The town was founded in 1697, and is located between Santarém and Oriximiná. It is the seat of the Diocese of Óbidos. The town was named after Óbidos, Portugal.

== Conservation ==
The north of the municipality contains part (7.36%) of the 4,245,819-hectare (10,491,650-acre) Grão-Pará Ecological Station, the largest fully protected tropical forest conservation unit on the planet. It contains 10% of the 3,172,978-hectare (7,840,600-acre) Trombetas State Forest, created in 2006.

== Transportation ==
Óbidos is served by Óbidos Airport.

== Sobral Santos II disaster ==
Óbidos, Pará, in Brazil, was the scene of the sinking of Sobral Santos II in September 1981, one of the worst maritime tragedies in the history of the Amazon River. The riverboat was making its weekly trip between Santarém and Manaus and was claimed to be overcrowded when it sank in Óbidos harbour. It is assumed over 300 people died in the disaster, with hundreds of bodies and body parts never identified.

== Villages ==
- Missão Tiriyó

== Climate ==
The climate is tropical monsoon (Köppen: Am), with great differences in precipitation according to the seasons.

Climate data for Óbidos (1981–2010)
Month	Jan	Feb	Mar	Apr	May	Jun	Jul	Aug	Sep	Oct	Nov	Dec	Year
Mean daily maximum °C (°F)	31.0 (87.8)	30.5 (86.9)	30.4 (86.7)	30.5 (86.9)	30.5 (86.9)	31.0 (87.8)	31.3 (88.3)	32.3 (90.1)	33.0 (91.4)	33.3 (91.9)	32.8 (91.0)	32.2 (90.0)	31.6 (88.9)
Daily mean °C (°F)	26.5 (79.7)	26.1 (79.0)	26.1 (79.0)	26.2 (79.2)	26.4 (79.5)	26.6 (79.9)	26.7 (80.1)	27.3 (81.1)	27.7 (81.9)	28.2 (82.8)	27.9 (82.2)	27.4 (81.3)	26.9 (80.4)
Mean daily minimum °C (°F)	23.0 (73.4)	22.8 (73.0)	22.9 (73.2)	23.0 (73.4)	23.1 (73.6)	22.9 (73.2)	22.7 (72.9)	23.0 (73.4)	23.3 (73.9)	23.7 (74.7)	23.7 (74.7)	23.5 (74.3)	23.1 (73.6)
Average precipitation mm (inches)	261.7 (10.30)	270.6 (10.65)	322.2 (12.69)	278.7 (10.97)	222.6 (8.76)	103.7 (4.08)	75.7 (2.98)	34.1 (1.34)	41.8 (1.65)	54.5 (2.15)	95.1 (3.74)	151.2 (5.95)	1,911.9 (75.27)
Average precipitation days (≥ 1.0 mm)	16	17	20	18	15	9	7	4	5	5	7	11	134
Average relative humidity (%)	85.5	87.9	88.5	88.6	87.6	85.1	82.8	80.0	78.3	76.9	78.8	80.9	83.4
Mean monthly sunshine hours	157.7	122.0	126.9	135.6	166.2	204.4	236.1	250.5	242.4	225.5	189.3	170.4	2,227
Source: Instituto Nacional de Meteorologia

== Notable people ==
- José Veríssimo — Writer

== See also ==
- List of municipalities in Pará
