= Alenquer, Pará =

Municipality in Pará, Brazil

Alenquer
- Municipality
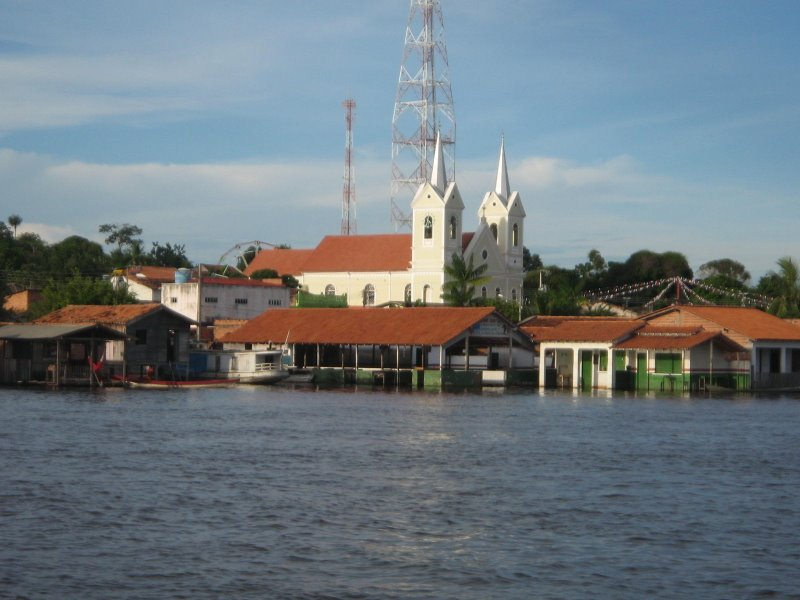

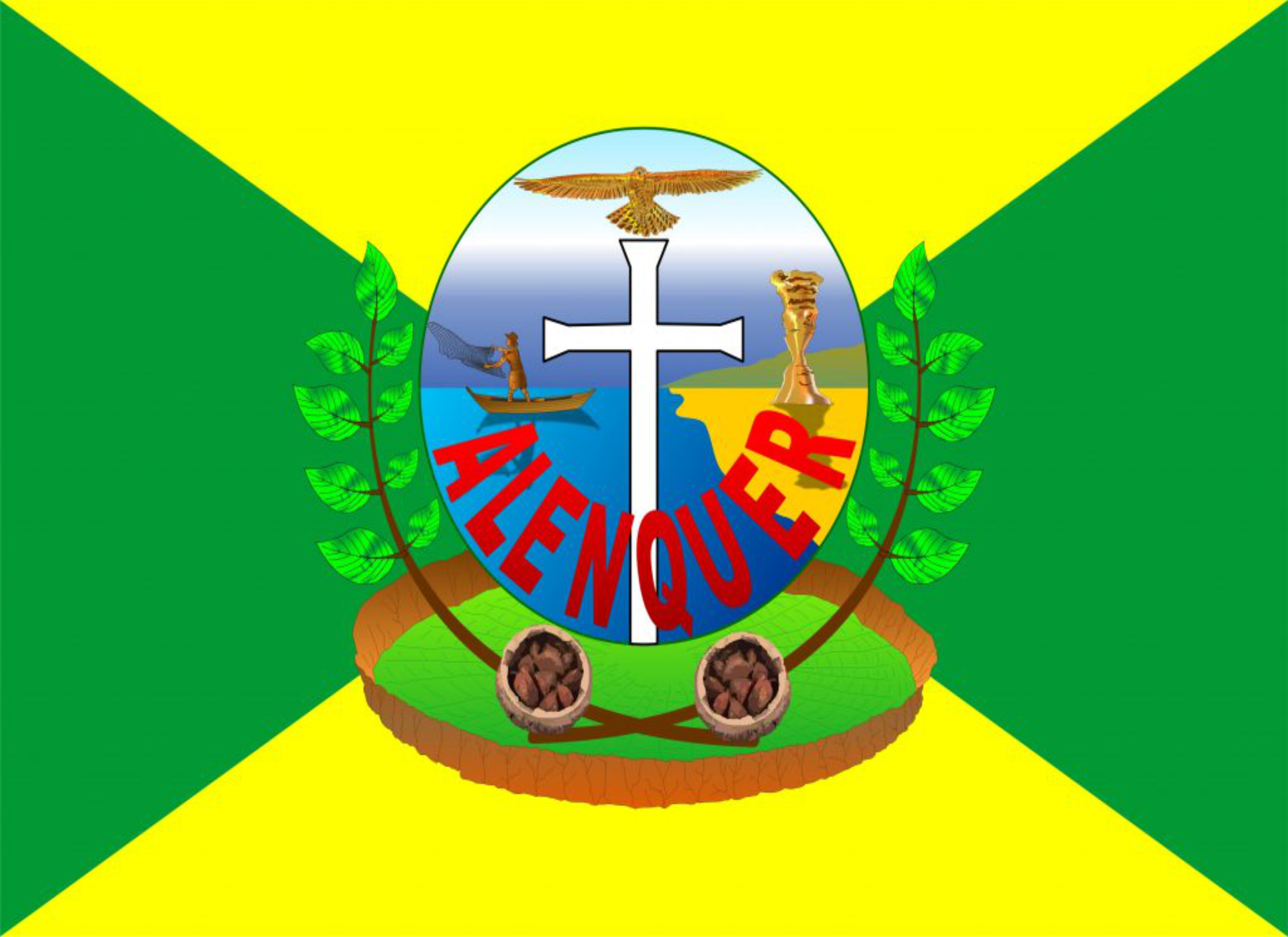
- Flag

- Location in Brazil Alenquer (Brazil)
- Coordinates: 1.944818°S 54.732019°W
- Country: Brazil
- Region: Northern
- State: Pará
- Mesoregion: Baixo Amazonas

Population (2020)
  - Total: 57,092
- Time zone: UTC−3 (BRT)

Alenquer is a municipality in the state of Pará in the Northern region of Brazil. The town is located on the northern bank of the Amazon River, roughly across from the city of Santarém.

The city is served by Alenquer Airport.

== Conservation ==
The municipality contains roughly half of the 216,601-hectare (535,230-acre) Mulata National Forest, a sustainable use conservation unit created in 2001. The north of the municipality contains part (13.31%) of the 4,245,819-hectare (10,491,650-acre) Grão-Pará Ecological Station, the largest fully protected tropical forest conservation unit on the planet. It contains 2% of the 3,172,978-hectare (7,840,600-acre) Trombetas State Forest, created in 2006.

== Notable people ==
- Delival Nobre (b. 1948), sports shooter

== See also ==
- List of municipalities in Pará
