= Oriximiná Airport =

Oriximiná Airport Aeroporto de Oriximiná
- IATA: ORX; ICAO: SNOX; LID: PA0014

Summary
- Airport type: Public
- Serves: Oriximiná
- Time zone: BRT (UTC−03:00)
- Elevation AMSL: 80 m (260 ft)
- Coordinates: 01°42′49″S 055°50′09″W

Map
- Location in Brazil ORX (Brazil)

Runways
Direction	Length		Surface
Direction	m	ft	Surface
17/35	1,600	5,249	Asphalt
- Sources: ANAC, DECEA

Oriximiná Airport (IATA: ORX, ICAO: SNOX) is the airport serving Oriximiná, Brazil.

== Access ==
The airport is located 8 km (5 mi) from downtown Oriximiná.

== See also ==
- List of airports in Brazil
