= Faro, Pará =

- Municipality
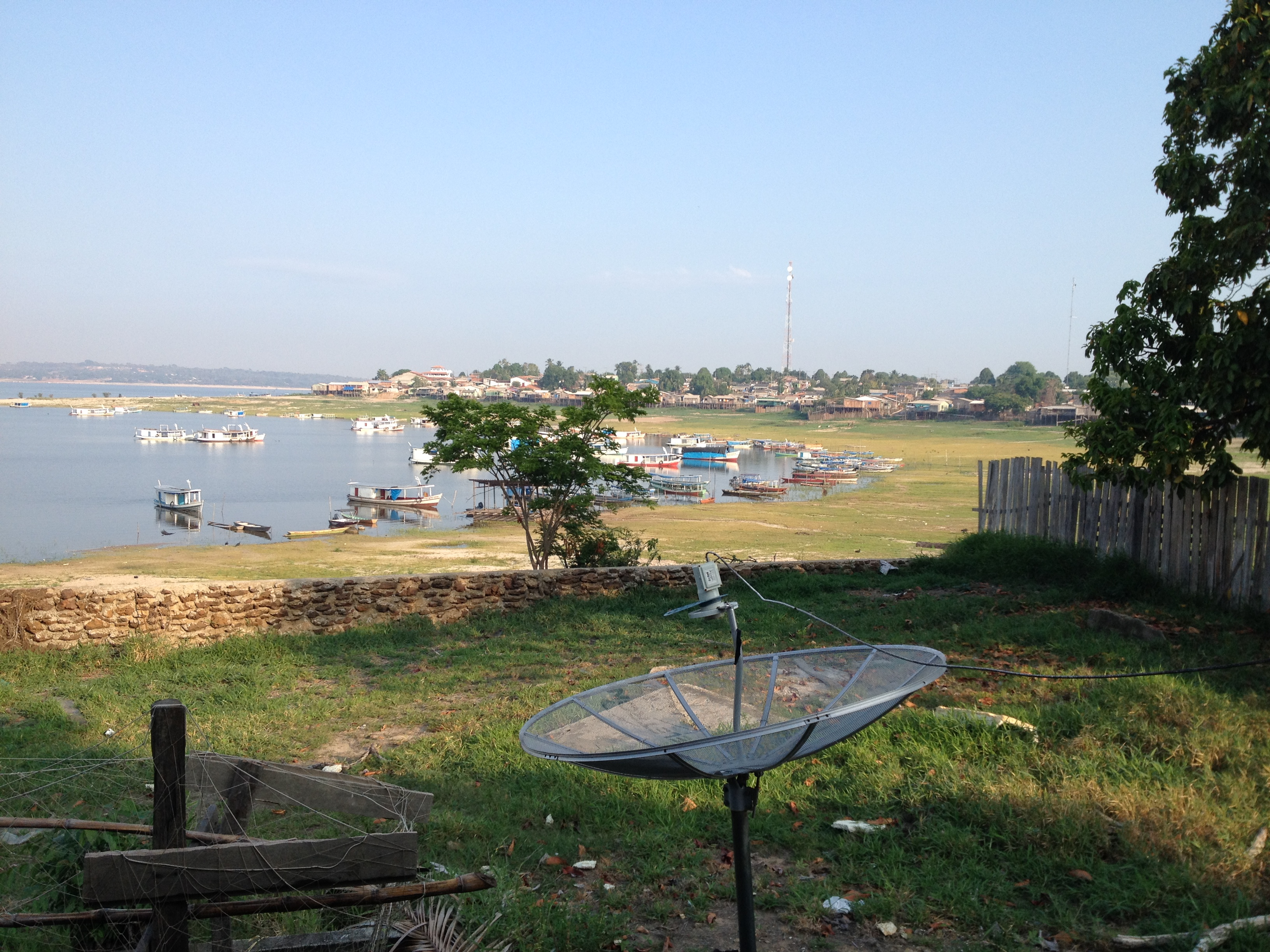

- Flag Coat of arms

- Location in Brazil Faro, Pará (Brazil)
- Coordinates: 2.170832°S 56.745°W
- Country: Brazil
- Region: Northern
- State: Pará
- Mesoregion: Baixo Amazonas

Population (2020)
  - Total: 7,070
- Time zone: UTC−2 (BRT)

Faro, Pará is a municipality in the state of Pará in the Northern region of Brazil.

The municipality contains part of the Saracá-Taquera National Forest, a 441,283-hectare (1,090,430-acre) sustainable use conservation unit created in 1989.

== See also ==
- List of municipalities in Pará
