= Sonnac, Charente-Maritime =

Sonnac
- Commune
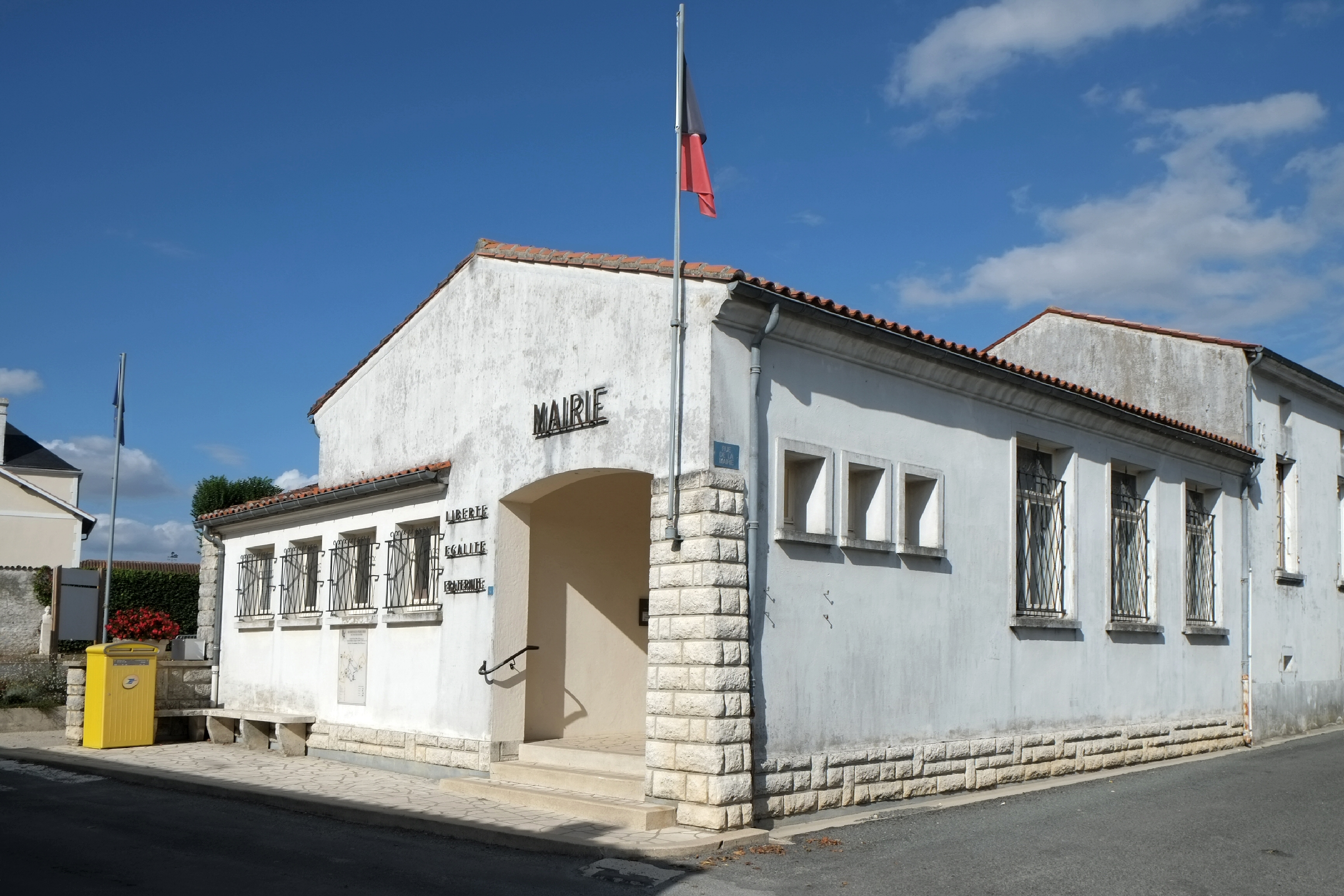
- The town hall in Sonnac
- Location of Sonnac
- Location within France Location within Nouvelle-Aquitaine
- Coordinates: 45°50′25″N 0°16′15″W
- Country: France
- Region: Nouvelle-Aquitaine
- Department: Charente-Maritime
- Arrondissement: Saint-Jean-d'Angély
- Canton: Matha

Government
  - Mayor (2020–2026): Laurent Bouillé
- Area^{1}: 17.12 km^{2} (6.61 sq mi)
- Elevation: 38 m (125 ft)
- Highest elevation: 63 m (207 ft)
- Lowest elevation: 18 m (59 ft)
- Population (2023): 512
  - Density: 29.9/km^{2} (77.5/sq mi)
- Time zone: UTC+01:00 (CET)
  - Summer (DST): UTC+02:00 (CEST)
- INSEE/Postal code: 17428 /17160
- ^{1} French Land Register data, which excludes lakes, ponds, glaciers > 1 km^{2} (0.386 sq mi or 247 acres) and river estuaries.

Sonnac (French pronunciation: [sɔnak]) is a commune in the Charente-Maritime department in southwestern France.

== Population ==
Historical population
Year	Pop.	±% p.a.
1968	673	—
1975	671	−0.04%
1982	558	−2.60%
1990	536	−0.50%
1999	540	+0.08%
2007	528	−0.28%
2012	536	+0.30%
2017	505	−1.18%
2023	512	+0.23%
Source: INSEE

== See also ==
- Communes of the Charente-Maritime department
