= Oriximiná =

Municipality in Pará, Brazil

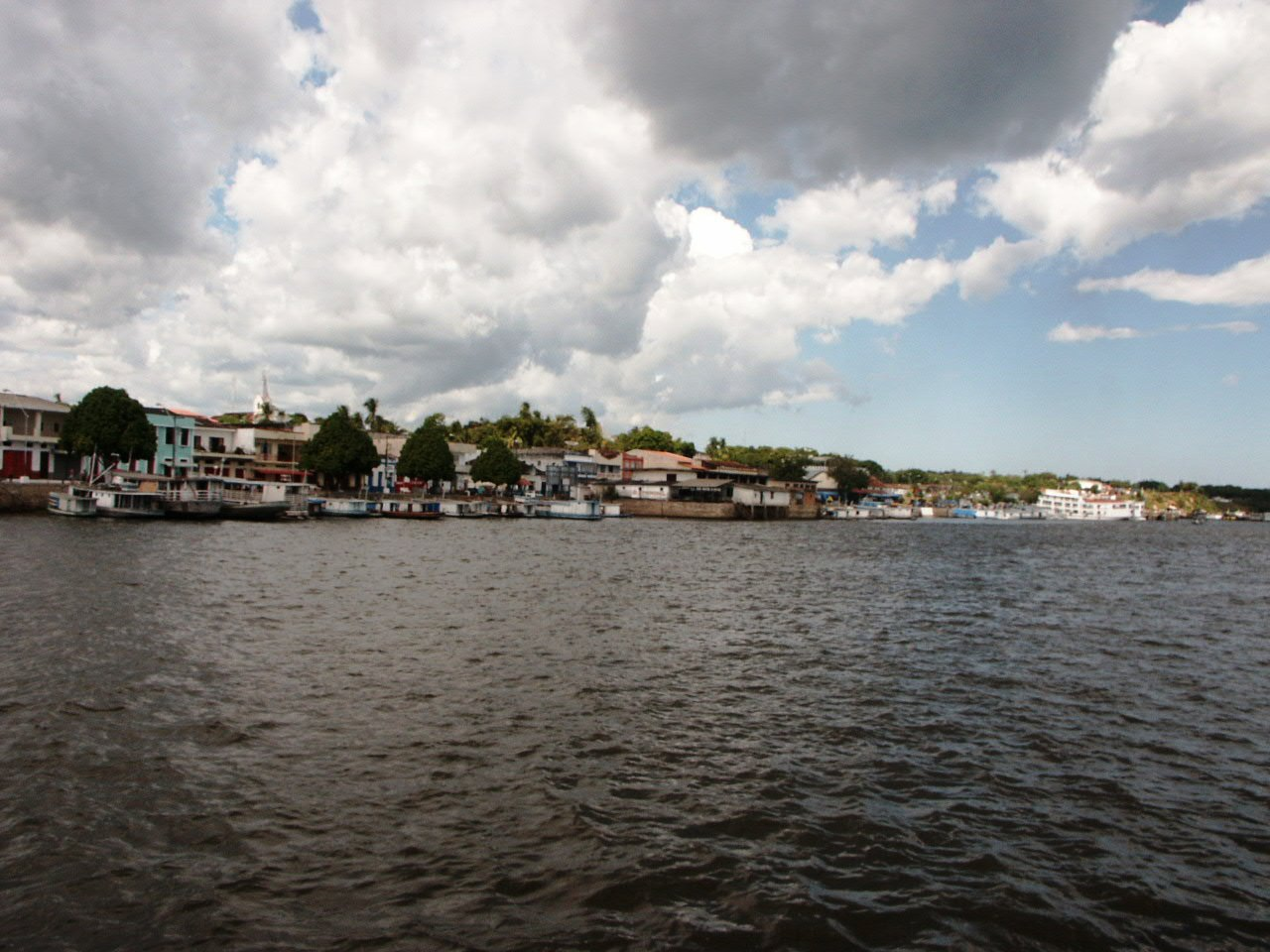

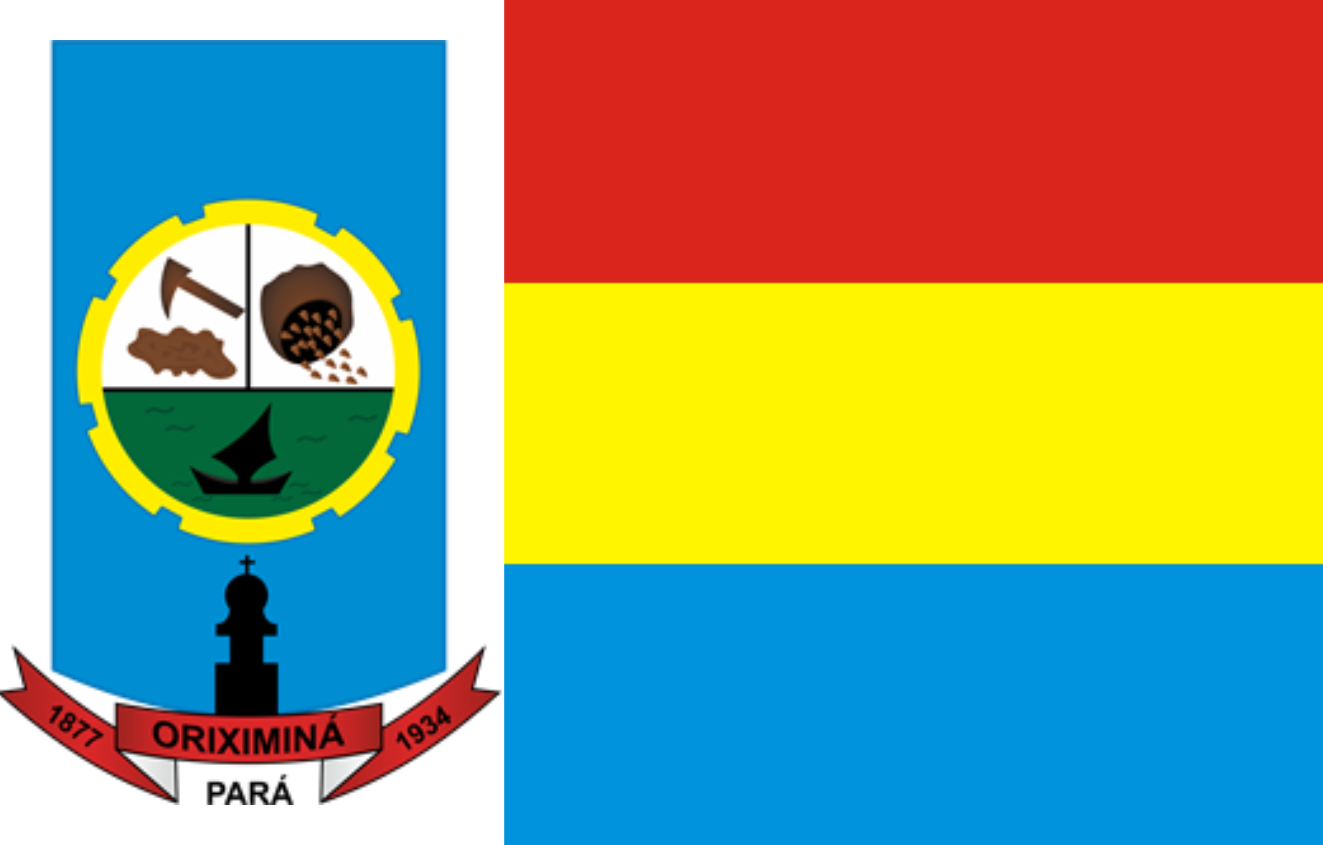
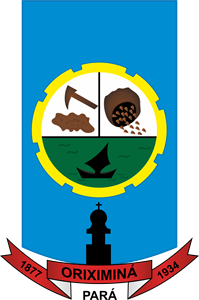
- Flag Coat of arms

- Location of Oriximiná
- Coordinates: 01°45′57″S 55°51′57″W
- Country: Brazil
- Region: Norte
- State: Pará
- Founded: 13 June 1877

Government
  - Mayor: Luiz Gonzaga Viana Filho (PV)

Area
  - Total: 107,603 km^{2} (41,546 sq mi)
- Elevation: 46 m (151 ft)

Population (2020)
  - Total: 74,016
  - Density: 0.5/km^{2} (1.3/sq mi)
- Time zone: UTC−3 (BRT)
- HDI (2000): 0.717 – medium
- Website: www.oriximina.pa.gov.br

Oriximiná is the westernmost and second-largest (by territorial area) municipality in the Brazilian state of Pará. It is also the fourth-largest in the country.

== Geography ==
The city lies on the Trombetas river, 40 kilometres (25 mi) northwest of Óbidos. The city is crossed by the Equator. Oriximiná is served by Oriximiná Airport located 8 kilometres (5.0 mi) from downtown Oriximiná. Porto Trombetas Airport located in the district of Porto Trombetas 70 kilometres (43 mi) away serves the population residing and working for the Mineração Rio do Norte S/A.

The north of the municipality contains most (75.89%) of the 4,245,819-hectare (10,491,650-acre) Grão-Pará Ecological Station, the largest fully protected tropical forest conservation unit on the planet. The municipality also contains the 1,007,580-hectare (2,489,800-acre) Rio Trombetas Biological Reserve, a strictly protected conservation unit created in 1979 to preserve the ecology and specifically to protect the Arrau turtle. The municipality contains part of the Saracá-Taquera National Forest, a 441,283-hectare (1,090,430-acre) sustainable-use conservation unit created in 1989. It contains 88% of the 3,172,978-hectare (7,840,600-acre) Trombetas State Forest, created in 2006.

== See also ==
- List of municipalities in Pará
- List of quilombola communities in Pará
