= Terra Santa =

- Municipality
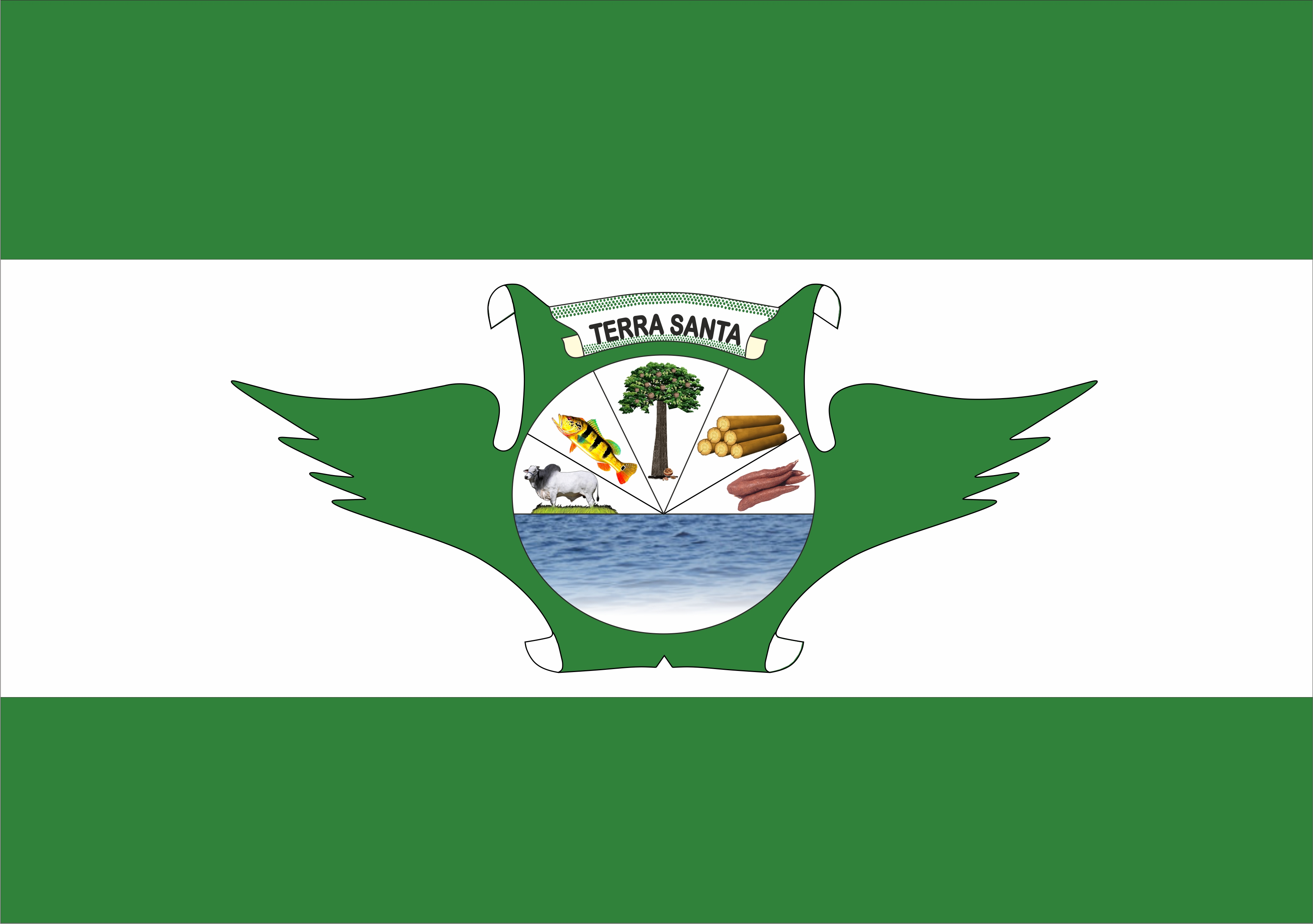
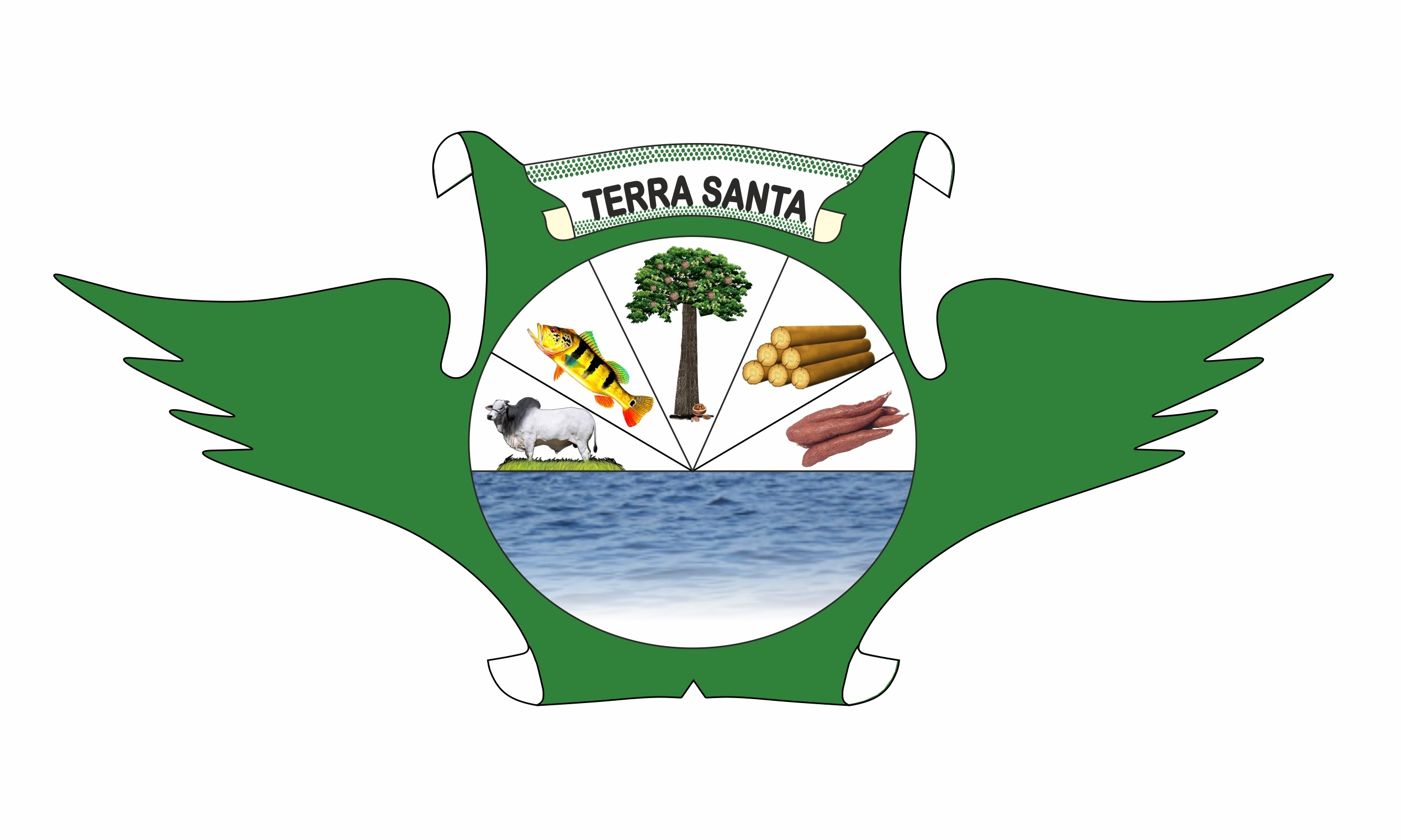
- Flag Coat of arms

- Location in Brazil Terra Santa (Brazil)
- Coordinates: 2.103889°S 56.486944°W
- Country: Brazil
- Region: Northern
- State: Pará
- Mesoregion: Baixo Amazonas

Population (2020)
  - Total: 18,917
- Time zone: UTC−3 (BRT)

Terra Santa is a municipality in the state of Pará in the Northern region of Brazil.

The municipality contains part of the Saracá-Taquera National Forest, a 441,283-hectare (1,090,430-acre) sustainable use conservation unit created in 1989.

== See also ==
- List of municipalities in Pará
