= Monte Alegre, Pará =

Municipality in Pará, Brazil

- Municipality
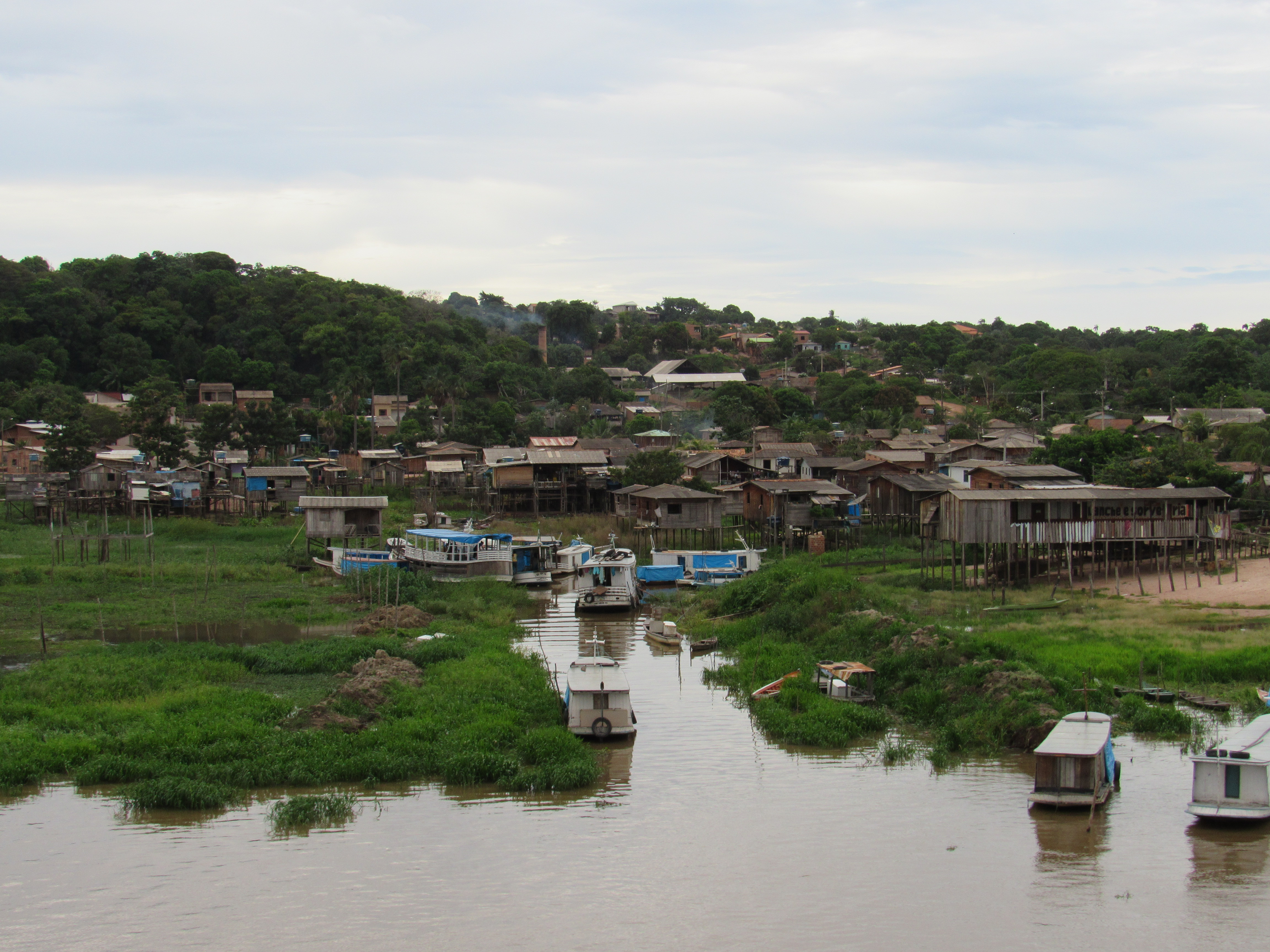

- Flag Coat of arms

- Location in Brazil Monte Alegre, Pará (Brazil)
- Coordinates: 2.002267°S 54.071742°W
- Country: Brazil
- Region: Northern
- State: Pará
- Mesoregion: Baixo Amazonas

Population (2020)
  - Total: 58,162
- Time zone: UTC−3 (BRT)

Monte Alegre, Pará is a municipality in the state of Pará in the Northern region of Brazil. It is located along the Amazon River in northern Brazil.

Near this area along the Amazon River is the Caverna da Pedra Pintada, an ancient archeological site with numerous rock paintings and pictographs. Excavations at the cave have found evidence of ancient peoples.

== Nature ==
The north of the municipality contains a small part (3.44%) of the 4,245,819-hectare (10,491,650-acre) Grão-Pará Ecological Station, the largest fully protected tropical forest conservation unit on the planet. It also includes a small part (5.51%) of the 11,518-square-kilometre (4,447 sq mi) Maicuru Biological Reserve. The municipality contains roughly half of the 216,601 hectares (535,230 acres) Mulata National Forest, a sustainable use conservation unit created in 2001. It contains all of the fully protected 3,678 hectares (9,090 acres) Monte Alegre State Park, created in 2001.

== Transportation ==
The city is served by Monte Alegre Airport.

== Climate ==
The climate is tropical savanna (Köppen: Aw) with dry season defined.

Climate data for Monte Alegre (1991–2020)
Month	Jan	Feb	Mar	Apr	May	Jun	Jul	Aug	Sep	Oct	Nov	Dec	Year
Mean daily maximum °C (°F)	30.9 (87.6)	30.2 (86.4)	30.1 (86.2)	30.2 (86.4)	30.4 (86.7)	30.5 (86.9)	31.0 (87.8)	31.9 (89.4)	32.6 (90.7)	33.1 (91.6)	32.8 (91.0)	32.0 (89.6)	31.3 (88.3)
Daily mean °C (°F)	26.7 (80.1)	26.2 (79.2)	26.2 (79.2)	26.3 (79.3)	26.5 (79.7)	26.6 (79.9)	26.8 (80.2)	27.6 (81.7)	28.1 (82.6)	28.4 (83.1)	28.1 (82.6)	27.5 (81.5)	27.1 (80.8)
Mean daily minimum °C (°F)	23.2 (73.8)	23.0 (73.4)	23.1 (73.6)	23.1 (73.6)	23.2 (73.8)	23.2 (73.8)	23.1 (73.6)	23.6 (74.5)	23.8 (74.8)	23.9 (75.0)	23.9 (75.0)	23.7 (74.7)	23.4 (74.1)
Average precipitation mm (inches)	161.3 (6.35)	225.2 (8.87)	303.6 (11.95)	334.4 (13.17)	256.4 (10.09)	152.9 (6.02)	102.1 (4.02)	42.7 (1.68)	18.2 (0.72)	29.1 (1.15)	61.8 (2.43)	100.7 (3.96)	1,788.4 (70.41)
Average precipitation days (≥ 1.0 mm)	12	14	17	19	17	13	9	4	2	2	3	6	118
Average relative humidity (%)	87.8	88.6	88.0	86.9	82.0	73.0	66.4	60.4	70.8	80.5	85.0	87.1	79.7
Mean monthly sunshine hours	156.9	177.1	127.9	134.3	165.9	189.9	233.8	249.2	237.2	240.4	207.1	184.2	2,303.9
Source 1: Instituto Nacional de Meteorologia
Source 2: NOAA (sun 1961–1990)

== See also ==
- List of municipalities in Pará
