= List of people from Wrocław =

People born in Wrocław.

== Before 1945 ==
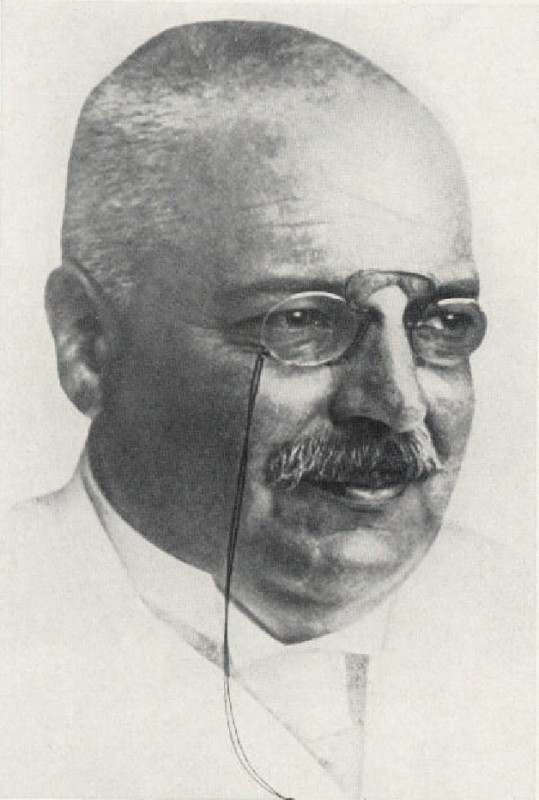
Alois Alzheimer, 1915

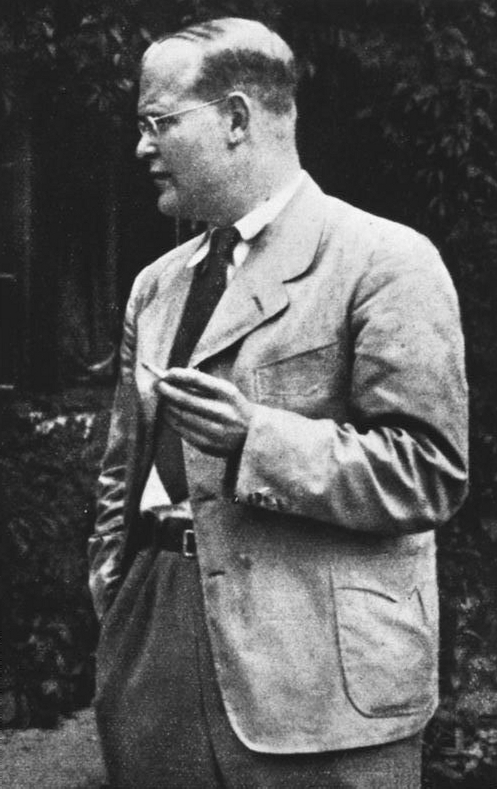
Dietrich Bonhoeffer, 1939

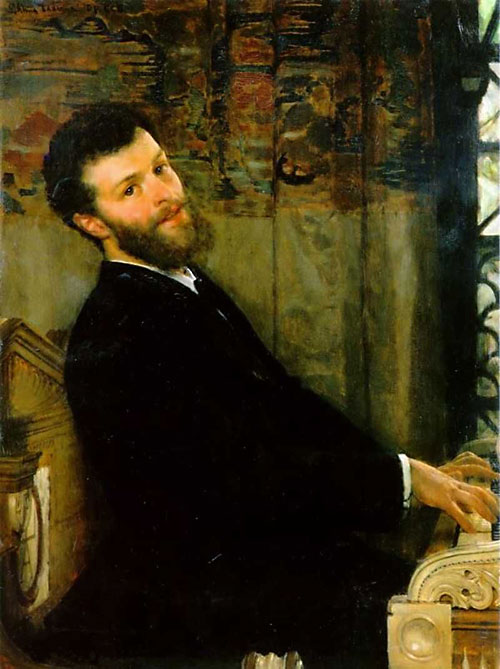
portrait of George Henschel, 1879

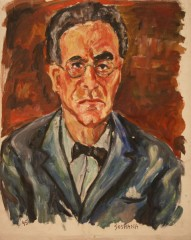
portrait of Otto Klemperer, 1945

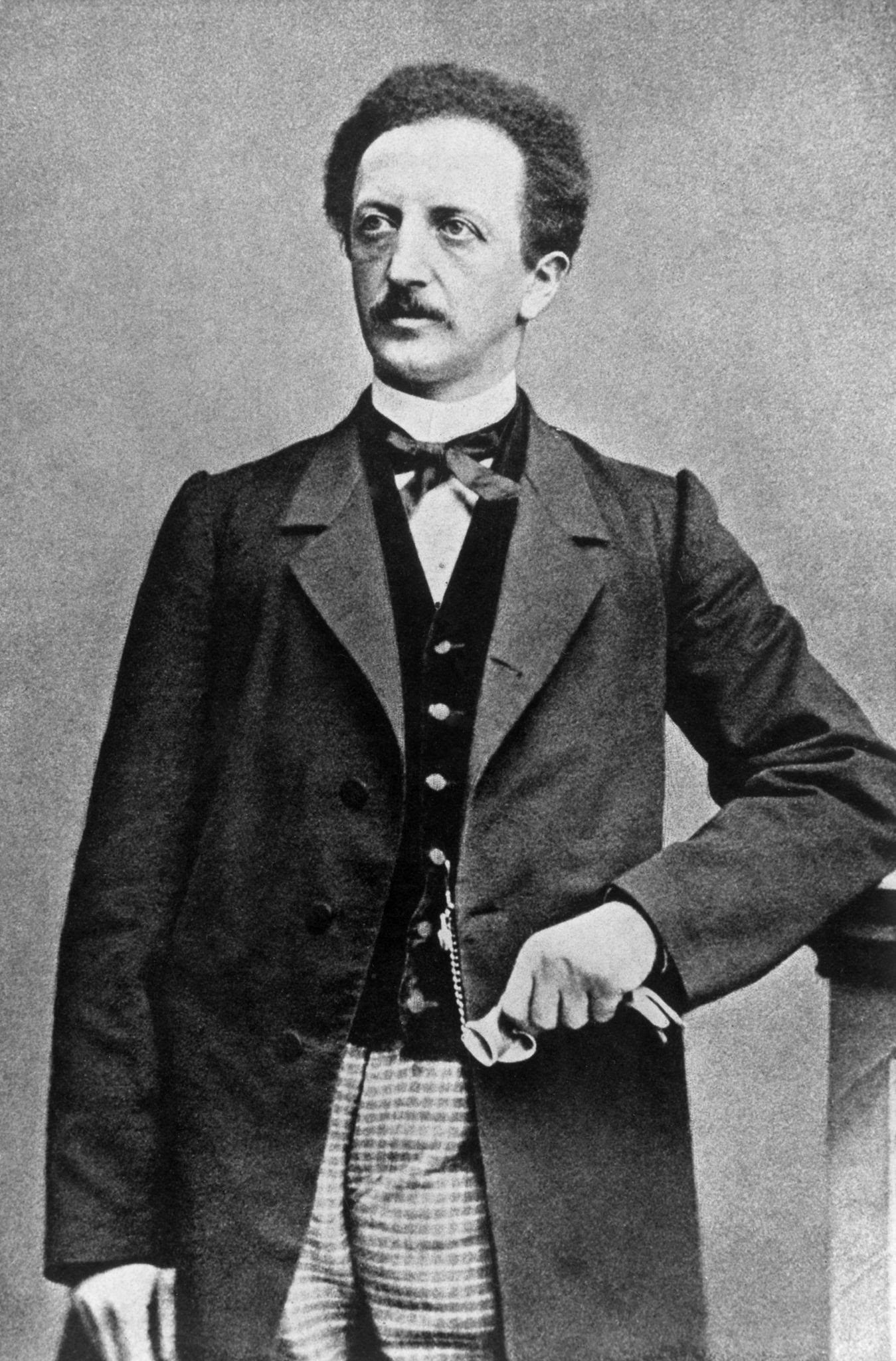
Ferdinand Lassalle, 1860

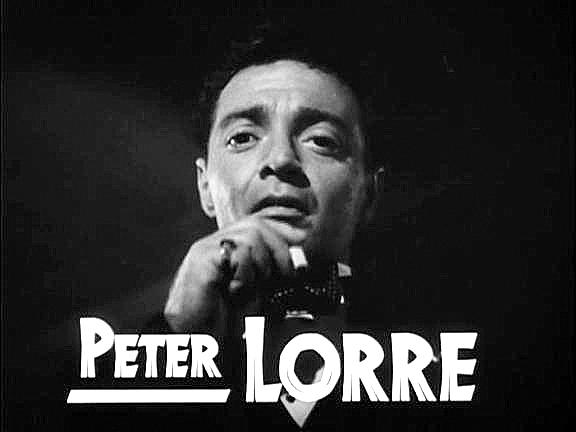
Peter Lorre, 1941

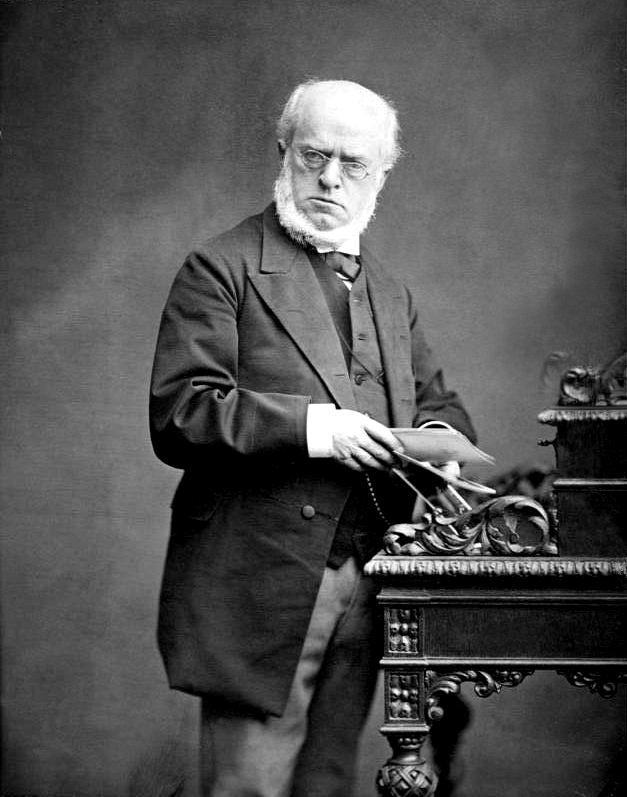
Adolph von Menzel, 1900

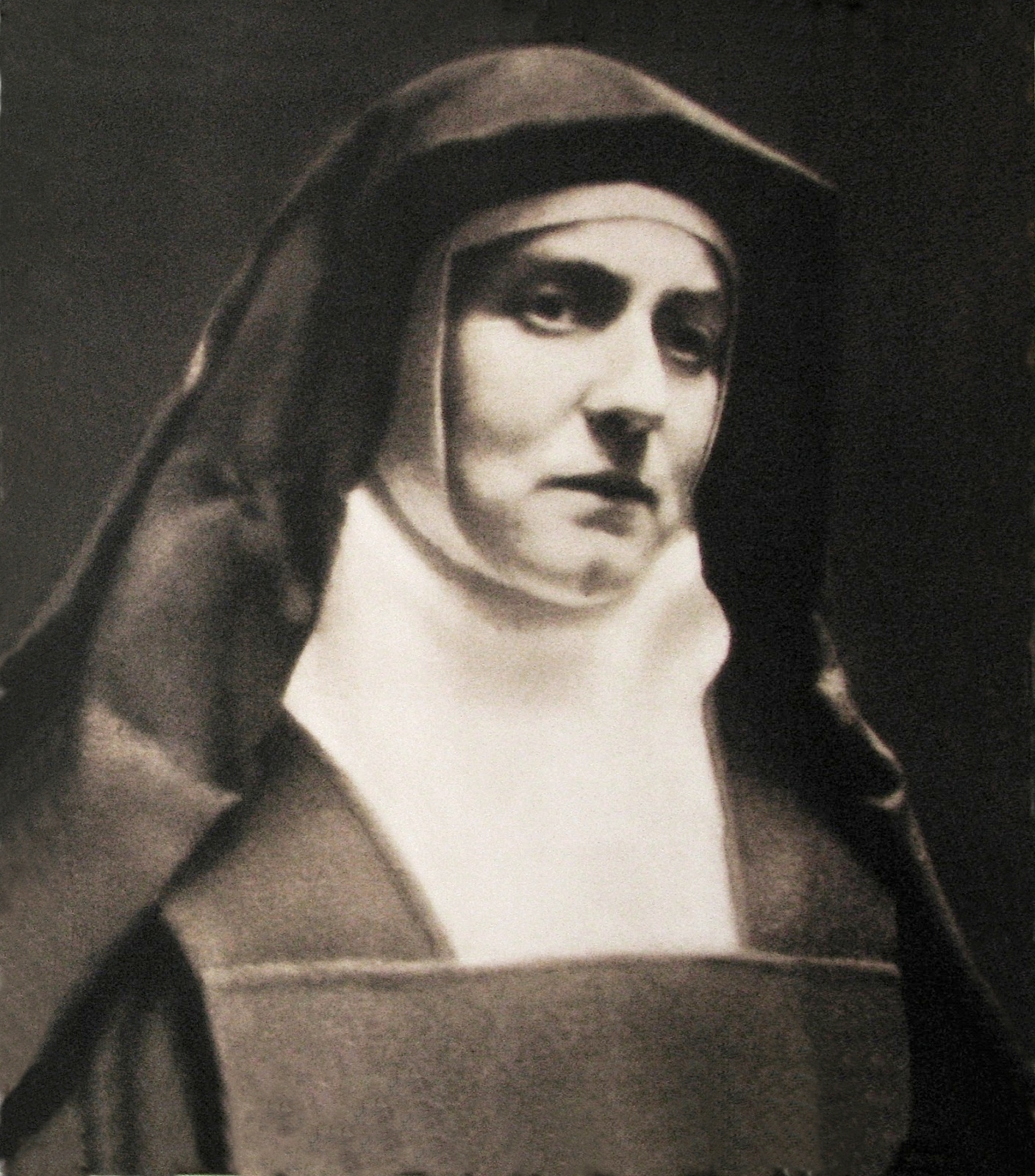
Edith Stein, ca.1938-1939

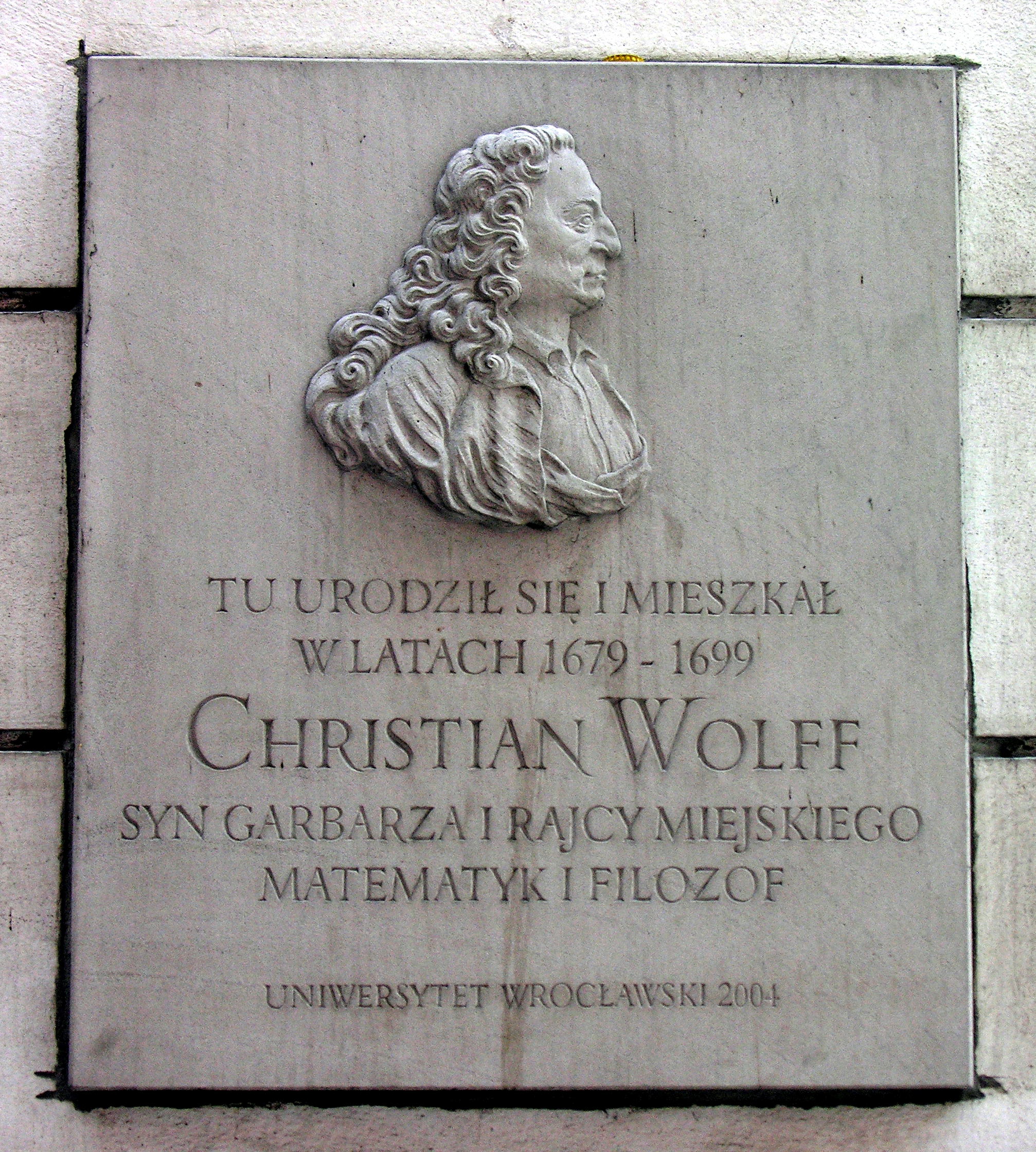
Plaque in honour of Christian Wolff in Wroclaw

- Alois Alzheimer (1864–1915) a psychiatrist and neuropathologist, discovered Alzheimer's disease
- Paul Amman (1634–1691), German physician and botanist.
- Günther Anders (1902–1992) a German-Austrian Jewish émigré, philosopher, essayist and journalist.
- Adolf Anderssen (1818–1879) a German chess master.
- Đorđe Andrejević-Kun (1904–1964), a Serbian painter and academic.
- Heinz Arndt (1915–2002), an Australian economist
- Leopold Auerbach (1828–1897), a German anatomist and neuropathologist
- Joannes Aurifaber Vratislaviensis (1517–1568), a Lutheran theologian and Protestant reformer.
- Bertha Badt-Strauss (1885–1970), a German writer and Zionist.
- Boleslaw Barlog (1906–1999), a German stage, film and opera director
- Erhard Bauschke (1912–1945), a German jazz and light music reedist and bandleader.
- Max Berg (1870–1947), a German architect and urban planner, designed the Centennial Hall
- Dietrich Bonhoeffer (1906–1945), Lutheran clergyman, leader of the resistance against Nazism
- Max Born (1882–1970), a German physicist and mathematician, developed quantum mechanics
- August Borsig (1804–1854), a German businessman who made steam engines
- Ernst Cassirer (1874–1945), a German philosopher, main interests: Epistemology & aesthetics
- Hendrik Claudius (c1655–1697), painter and apothecary
- Ferdinand Cohn (1828–1898), a biologist, a founder of modern bacteriology and microbiology.
- Richard Courant (1888–1972), a German American mathematician, wrote What Is Mathematics?
- Harri Czepuck (1927–2015), a German journalist.
- Walter Damrosch (1862–1950), an American conductor and composer.
- John Gunther Dean (1926–2019), an American diplomat, the United States ambassador to five nations.
- Johann Dzierzon (1811–1906), a Polish beekeeper, discovered parthenogenesis in bees.
- Hermann von Eichhorn (1848–1918), a Prussian Generalfeldmarschall during WWI.
- Norbert Elias (1897–1990), a German/British sociologist, worked on civilizing/decivilizing processes.
- Eduard Vogel von Falckenstein (1797-1885), a Prussian General der Infanterie
- Friedrich Karl Georg Fedde (1873–1942), a German botanist.
- George Forell (1919–2011), a scholar, author, lecturer and guest professor re. Christian ethics.
- Otfrid Förster (1873–1941) a German neurologist and neurosurgeon
- Heinz Fraenkel-Conrat (1910–1999) a biochemist, researched viruses.
- Zecharias Frankel (1801–1875), rabbi and founder of Conservative Judaism
- Hans Freeman (1929–2008), Australian bioinorganic chemist and protein crystallographer
- Protásio Frikel (1912–1974), German-Brazilian missionary and anthropologist
- Maria Frisé (1926–2022), German author and journalist
- Friedrich von Gentz (1764–1832), a German diplomat and writer.
- Alfred Gomolka (1942–2020), a German politician and MEP
- Rudolf von Gottschall (1823–1909), a German poet, dramatist, literary critic and literary historian.
- Felix Hausdorff (1868–1942), mathematician, one of the founders of algebraic topology
- Martin Helwig (1516–1574) a German cartographer, created the first map of Silesia
- Sir George Henschel (1850–1934) a British baritone, pianist, conductor and composer.
- Johann Heß (1490–1547), Lutheran theologian, Protestant reformer of Breslau and Silesia
- Christian Hoffmann von Hoffmannswaldau (1616–1679) a German poet of the Baroque era
- August, Prince of Hohenlohe-Öhringen (1784–1853), a German general and nobleman.
- Karl von Holtei (1798–1880), German poet and actor.
- E. A. J. Honigmann (1927–2011), a British scholar of English Literature
- Heinz Hopf (1894–1971), a German mathematician who worked on topology and geometry.
- Vernon Ingram (1924–2006), a German–American academic professor of biology in the US.
- Gustav Adolph Kenngott (1818–1897), a German mineralogist.
- Alfred Kerr (1867–1948), theatre critic and essayist
- Gustav Kirchhoff (1824–1887), a German physicist, dealt with electrical circuits and spectroscopy
- Gerhard Kittel (1888–1948), a German Lutheran theologian and lexicographer of biblical languages.
- Friedrich Heinrich von Kittlitz (1799–1874), artist, naval officer, explorer and naturalist.
- Otto Klemperer (1885–1973), orchestral conductor and composer
- August Kopisch (1799–1853), a German poet and painter.
- Wojciech Korfanty (1873–1939), a Polish activist, journalist and politician.
- Arthur Korn (1870–1945), physicist, invented transmission of photographs by facsimile and wireless
- Arthur Korn (1891–1978), a German architect and urban planner, proponent of modernism
- Carl Ferdinand Langhans (1782–1869), a Prussian architect whose specialty was theatres.
- Carl Gotthard Langhans (1732–1808), a Prussian master builder and royal architect.
- Ferdinand Lassalle (1825–1864), a Prussian-German jurist, philosopher and socialist.
- Carl Friedrich Lessing (1808–1880), a German historical and landscape painter.
- Marie Leszczyńska (1703 in Trzebnica – 1768), Queen consort of France.
- Daniel Casper von Lohenstein (1635–1683), a Baroque Silesian playwright, lawyer, diplomat and poet
- Peter Lorre (1904–1964), an Austrian-Hungarian and American actor.
- Georg Lunge (1839–1923), a German chemist.
- Rudolf Meidner (1914–2005), a Swedish economist and socialist theorist
- Joachim Meisner (1933–2017), Cardinal priest and archbishop of Cologne
- Adolph Menzel (1815–1905), a German Realist artist noted for drawings, etchings and paintings.
- Jan Mikulicz-Radecki (1850-1905), surgeon, contributed to development of modern surgery
- Richard Mohaupt (1904–1957), a German composer and Kapellmeister.
- Edda Moser (born 1938), a German operatic soprano.
- Moritz Moszkowski (1854–1925), a composer, pianist and teacher of Polish-Jewish descent.
- Sepp Piontek (1940–2026), German footballer and football coach
- Hugo von Pohl (1855–1916), a German admiral, commander of High Seas Fleet
- Louis Prang (1824–1909), printer, lithographer and publisher
- Y. Michel Rabbinowicz (1892 - ?), author
- Michael Oser Rabin (1931–2026), mathematician and computer scientist
- Manfred von Richthofen (1892–1918), World War I flying ace (the "Red Baron")
- Oskar von Riesenthal (1830–1898) a German forester, ornithologist, hunter and writer.
- Ludwig Rosenfelder (1813-1881), German painter
- Horst Rosenthal (1915–1942), German-born French cartoonist
- Julius von Sachs (1832–1897), a German botanist.
- Johann Gottfried Scheibel (1783–1843), theological professor and dissenter to the Prussian Union
- Friedrich Schleiermacher (1768–1834) a Reformed theologian, philosopher and biblical scholar
- Auguste Schmidt (1833–1902), a German feminist, educator, journalist and women's rights activist.
- W.E. Scholz (1807 or 1808–1866), German composer and conductor
- Margarethe Siems (1879–1952), a German operatic coloratura soprano
- Angelus Silesius (ca.1624–1677), a German Catholic priest, physician, mystic and religious poet.
- Karl Slotta (1895–1987), biochemist
- Edith Stein (1891–1942), philosopher and Roman Catholic martyr
- Michael Steinberg (1928–2009) an American music critic and author
- Fritz Stern (1926–2016), American historian of German & Jewish history and historiography.
- Friedrich Wilhelm von Steuben (1730–1794), Inspector General of the Continental Army during the American Revolutionary War
- Siegbert Tarrasch (1862–1934), chess player
- Augustin Theiner ((1804–1874), theologian and Church historian of the Vatican Apostolic Archive
- August Tholuck (1799–1877), a German Protestant theologian, pastor and historian.
- Michel Thomas (1914–2005), war hero and language teacher.
- Heinz Henry Todtmann (1908–1975), German-Jewish journalist and NS collaborator.
- Zacharias Ursinus (1534–1583) a German Reformed theologian and Protestant reformer.
- Christian Wolff (1679–1754), a German philosopher.
- Adolf Wuttke (1819–1870) a German Protestant theologian.
- Johann Heinrich Zedler (1706–1751), publisher of a German encyclopedia, the Grosses Universal-Lexicon.

== After 1945 ==
Coat of arms of Wrocław

- Jan Borysewicz - guitar player, composer, leader of the rock band Lady Pank
- Leszek Czarnecki - businessman and billionaire
- Artur Ekert - physicist
- Władysław Frasyniuk - politician
- Jolanta Fraszyńska, actress
- Robert Fudali - sole member of black metal band Graveland
- Waldemar Fydrych - alias "Major"; artist, founder of the Orange Alternative happening movement
- Eugeniusz Geppert - painter
- Kamil Giżycki - writer and traveler
- Jerzy Grotowski - theatre director and theatrical avant-garde figure
- Mirosław Hermaszewski - cosmonaut
- Ludwik Hirszfeld - microbiologist, co-discover of the inheritance of the BO blood type
- Marek Hłasko - novelist, writer
- Hubert Hurkacz - tennis player
- Klaudia Jachira - politician and comedian
- Lech Janerka - singer, musician and composer
- Ewa Klonowski - forensic anthropologist
- Aleksandr Ivanovich Korolyov - vice-president of the Pridnestrovian Moldavian Republic
- Urszula Kozioł - poet
- Marek Krajewski - writer
- Wojciech Kurtyka - mountain climber
- Aleksandra Kurzak - opera singer
- Olaf Lubaszenko - actor and film director
- Jan Łopuszański - physicist
- Mata - rapper
- Mateusz Morawiecki - politician, former Prime Minister of Poland
- Rafał Omelko - athlete
- Piotr Ponikowski - cardiologist
- Tadeusz Różewicz - poet and writer
- Wanda Rutkiewicz - mountaineer
- Selma Nicklass-Kempner - soprano
- Andrzej Sekuła - cinematographer and film director
- Hugo Steinhaus - mathematician
- Włodzimierz Trzebiatowski - chemist and physicist
- Aleksander Wachniewski - engineer and politician, government plenipotentiary in Wrocław (1945–1947)
- Michał Witkowski - writer
- Rafał Wojaczek - poet
- Dagmara Wozniak (born 1988) - Polish-American U.S. Olympic sabre fencer
- Maciej Żurowski - historian of French literature, translator, Romanist

== Nobel laureates ==
listed by year of award

- Theodor Mommsen (1902)
- Philipp Lenard (1905)
- Eduard Buchner (1907)
- Paul Ehrlich (1908)
- Gerhart Hauptmann (1912)
- Fritz Haber (1918)
- Friedrich Bergius (1931)
- Erwin Schrödinger (1933)
- Otto Stern (1943)
- Max Born (1954)
- Reinhard Selten (1994)
