= Akurio language =

Cariban language of Suriname

Akuriyó
- Akurio
- Native to: Suriname
- Region: Sipaliwini District
- Ethnicity: 40 Akurio people (2012)
- Extinct: 2002; 3 semi-speakers (2012)
- Language family: Cariban: Guianan Carib; Taranoan; Tiriyo; Akuriyó

Language codes
- ISO 639-3: ako
- Glottolog: akur1238
- ELP: Akuriyo
- Linguasphere: 80-AHA-bc

- Akuriyo is classified as Critically Endangered by the UNESCO Atlas of the World's Languages in Danger.

Akurio (Eastern Maroon Creole: Awayaikuletongo), also known as Akuriyó, is an extinct Cariban language. It was spoken by the Akurio people in Suriname until the late 20th century, after which they switched to the closely related Tiriyó language. Akurio has since undergone heavy influence from Tiriyó, and was replaced by it, with the last native speakers being reported to have died in 2002. Only three people could remember the language in 2012.

== Name ==
The name "Akurio" is derived from the word akuri 'agouti' and the suffix -jo, used to derive names of peoples; thus, the name "Akurio" presumably translates to 'agouti people'.

== Classification ==
Akurio is a Cariban language belonging to the Taranoan subgroup. Other Taranoan languages include Tiriyó, which is the closest language to Akurio, and Carijona, spoken in Colombia.

== History ==
The Akurio people were first contacted by outsiders in 1937, during Conrad Carel Käyser's expedition to the Oelemari River. The next year, Willem Ahlbrinck, a Catholic missionary, who called them Wama, contacted the Akurio again. Claudius de Goeje published vocabularies of "Wama" recorded from these expeditions in his 1946 book Études linguistiques caraïbes. No further contact was made until 1968, when some Wayana people met a group of Akurio by chance, prompting missionaries to immediately begin resettling them into sedentary settlements, particularly the Tiriyó villages of Kwamalasamutu and Tepoe. This led to the rapid adoption of the Tiriyó language. Uncontacted groups of Akurio are thought to still live along the upper Oelemari and in the Oranje Mountains, and may still speak Akurio without influence from Tiriyó.

The last native speakers of Akurio died in 2002. During this period, only ten people were estimated to have Akuriyó as a second language. By 2012, only three semi-speakers remained. Sepi Akuriyó, one of the last surviving speakers of Akuriyó, went missing on 2 December 2018, when a small plane carrying eight people disappeared during a flight over the Amazon rainforest. The search and rescue operation was called off after two weeks.

== Phonology ==
The following phonology is preliminary and derived from fieldwork with non-native speakers over a short period of time. The phonological system of Akurio is similar to those of other Taranoan languages.

=== Consonants ===
Akurio consonants
	Bilabial	Alveolar	Palatal	Velar	Glottal
Plosive	p	t		k	(ʔ)
Affricate		tʃ			
Nasal	m	n			
Tap/Flap		ɽ (Note: The flap is slightly retroflex with some lateral release.)			
Approximant	w		j		

=== Vowels ===
Akurio, like the other Taranoan languages, has seven vowels. Vowel length is apparently phonemic, or contrastive.

Akurio vowels
	Front		Central		Back	
	short	long	short	long	short	long
Close	i	iː	ɨ	ɨː	u	uː
Mid	e	eː	ə	əː	o	oː
Open			a	aː		
