= Chet Bitterman =

American linguist and Christian missionary

Chester Allen "Chet" Bitterman III

Personal life
- Born: Chester Allen Bitterman III; 30 November 1952
- Died: 7 March 1981 (aged 28) near Bogotá, Colombia
- Cause of death: Murdered
- Home town: Lancaster, Pennsylvania
- Spouse: Brenda Gardner
- Education: Columbia Bible College
- Known for: American Christian missionary murdered by M-19 in Colombia
- Other name: Chet Bitterman

Religious life
- Religion: Christianity
- Institute: Wycliffe Bible Translators

Senior posting
- Based in: Colombia

Chester Allen "Chet" Bitterman III (November 30, 1952 – March 1981) was an American linguist and Christian missionary who was kidnapped and killed by members of the 19th of April Movement (M-19) in Colombia in 1981.

Originally from Lancaster, Pennsylvania, Bitterman attended Columbia Bible College in South Carolina, where he first heard of the Christian mission organization Wycliffe Bible Translators. After graduation, he received linguistics training from the Summer Institute of Linguistics (SIL) in North Dakota, and married Brenda Gardner, a fellow alumna of SIL's training program. Together, they traveled to Colombia to begin mission work with Wycliffe in 1979.

As an inexperienced missionary, Bitterman was not immediately assigned to an indigenous people where he could begin to translate the Bible into a new language as many Wycliffe missionaries do. Instead, he worked primarily at Wycliffe's base in Lomalinda, first working in the radio tower and later serving as security coordinator. Their time at Lomalinda was broken up by a six-month service trip in Bogotá where Bitterman and his wife assisted a more experienced translator couple. However, by 1981, plans began to fall into place for Bitterman and his wife to attempt to reach the Carijona people in the Colombian jungle.

== Kidnapping and Assassination ==
The kidnapping and assassination of the American missionary Chester Bitterman in Colombia was a major terrorist event which dominated worldwide media for nearly seven weeks in early 1981. It was a major test for the newly elected Reagan Administration and an unprecedented challenge for Colombia, which was, at that time, experiencing guerrilla attacks on a daily basis.

By January 1981 Bitterman, 28, had spent fifteen months in Colombia as a member of the Summer Institute of Linguistics (SIL), associates of Wycliffe Bible Translators. He, along with his wife Brenda Gardner and two small girls, were planning to translate the Bible into the language of the pre-literate Carijona Indians. The Bittermans were based at the SIL center of Loma Linda (in the Colombian province of Meta) but Chet had been suffering from biliary colic and had come to Bogotá for a gall bladder operation.

Bitterman's kidnapping lasted for a total of 47 days. It began at dawn on January 19, 1981, when six armed men and a woman entered the guest house of the SIL in a northern suburb of Bogotá claiming to be police. Once inside they captured him in the presence of his wife, girls and other SIL personnel. The captors had first asked for the SIL director, Albert Wheeler, but, not finding him, took Bitterman instead. The gunmen searched the house, and SIL documents and electronic equipment were also taken.

Three days later, on January 22, the kidnappers released a statement. They identified themselves as the M-19, a Colombian guerrilla movement, and claimed the SIL was a front for the CIA and had installed American missiles in a lake at its Loma Linda center. They communicated their two demands in a letter to American President Ronald Reagan: that SIL leave Colombia immediately and that their manifesto be published in The New York Times and the Washington Post. They also stated that if both demands were not met in one month’s time, Bitterman would be killed.

In the following days both the Colombian and American governments defended SIL's presence in the country, denied its involvement with the CIA and insisted they would not negotiate with terrorists. On January 24, the SIL stated formally that it would not leave Colombia and urged Bitterman's capturers not to shed innocent blood.

On January 26 Colombian television was interrupted (a communication tactic used at the time by M-19) with a broadcast claim that M-19 did not have Bitterman in their possession. They claimed the Colombian government had captured him ‘to discredit their movement’. The same claim was made the next day by M-19 prisoners in the ‘La Picota’ prison. The Colombian Ministry of Defense immediately qualified these claims as ‘absurd’. On January 28 a communiqué bearing the M-19 logo was sent to the news media threatening to kill Bitterman on February 19 (one month after his capture) if SIL did not leave Colombia. On January 29 photos of masked armed men surrounding Bitterman were sent to the media. Behind them was the M-19 flag. Based on these conflicting claims, the media and some military officials began to speculate that the kidnappers were a dissident M-19 faction.

On January 30, 11 days into the kidnapping, two contradictory circulars both signed by the M-19 were made public. One, originating in Cali, Colombia and signed ‘Comando Superior Provisional del M-19’, strongly criticized the M-19 commander, Jaime Bateman Cayón, for compromising with the enemy by running for election. It called him a ‘clown’ and expelled him from the movement. It blamed the CIA for Bitterman's abduction. The other circular, originating in Medellin, Colombia and signed by the ‘Comando Superior’ (with signatures from Bateman Cayón, Ivan Marino Ospina and Carlos Toledo Plata—the acknowledged leaders of M-19), accused unnamed ‘inferior commanders’ within M-19 of usurping their authority by kidnapping Bitterman.

SIL had been in Colombia for years before the kidnapping and their presence had sometimes provoked controversy. Their approach was accused by the guerrillas and by religious and governmental organs of being detrimental to indigenous cultures and their access to indigenous peoples for evangelical proselytizing. SIL denied this. On January 30 the SIL invited journalists to their center at Loma Linda, which the kidnappers had claimed was a clandestine CIA base, to inspect it and document there was no American military or intelligence presence. On February 2 the Colombian government and the US Embassy in Bogotá declared their support for the SIL and disclaimed any attachment to the CIA. On January 25 and again on February 2 an intense manhunt by the security services for the kidnappers’ hiding place took place in Bogotá and other locations in Colombia. Both searches were unfruitful. On February 5 a message from Bitterman was received by his wife claiming he was fine and was being well-treated. On February 6 his wife sent a message back to him, along with a plea to his capturers for his life. Additional photographs were sent a week later showing Bitterman playing chess with his captors.

On February 7, there was another interruption of Colombia television in which the M-19 again claimed to not be holding Bitterman and on the 9th they said they refused to answer for his life. On February 11, a message also claiming to be from M-19 repeated death threats against Bitterman and said the SIL was ‘an affront to Colombian sovereignty’. On February 15, three journalists were kidnapped in Bogotá and taken on a several hour's drive to an unknown location at which masked men, claiming to be from M-19, received them and asked to be interviewed. During that interview the masked men denied they were holding Bitterman or that there was any division within the M-19. Only one of the guerrillas met the journalists unmasked, their leader, Everth Bustamante García. The journalists were then driven back to Bogotá and released. On February 17 a cassette was received at a radio station with evidence Bitterman was still alive. It claimed there were ideological differences between the M-19 and a dissident group within the organization who'd captured him. On February 20, one day after the threatened execution date, M-19 announced it had prolonged the sentence until March 6 in order to give SIL more time to leave the country. On February 27 another journalist was kidnapped and taken to the headquarters of ‘Auto-Defensa Obrera’, a left-wing guerrilla group, where he was given information similar to that given to the three previous journalists. From the information given to this journalist it appeared that this organization was closely aligned to M-19. They also denied involvement in Bitterman's kidnapping.

Intensive negotiations between February 19 and March 6, involving a Protestant pastor, a Catholic priest, journalists, SIL representatives and the kidnappers, failed to arrive at an agreement. The kidnappers stated that they would only accept an immediate and complete SIL departure from the country, a condition SIL refused to meet. During the days before the assassination a number of secret telephone contacts took place mainly involving SIL and journalists on one side and the kidnappers on the other, but without Colombian authorities being present. In the final session, which lasted several hours, the kidnappers gave their names as ‘Chucho’ and ‘Genaro’, the latter being one of the leaders in the M-19 takeover of the Dominican embassy the previous year.

In the early hours of the morning of March 7 Bitterman was killed by a single bullet to the chest in a kidnapped minibus on a Bogotá street. The bus driver, who'd been bound and blindfolded, managed to untie himself and alerted police around 5.30 AM. The authorities arrived, found Bitterman's body draped in a M-19 banner, transported it to the Institute of Legal Medicine for identification (by his wife, Brenda, and the SIL head, Albert Wheeler) and performed an autopsy. Toxicology tests suggested Bitterman had been drugged before being shot. The periodical El Tiempo announced the death as follows:

The American citizen Chester Allen Bitterman, an official of the Summer Institute of Linguistics, kidnapped on January 19 by a dissident group of the M-19, was murdered in the early hours of yesterday morning inside a bus in Bogota. The crime occurred a few hours after a marathon telephone press conference between all the media and two men speaking on behalf of the subversive group, who identified themselves as Chucho and Genaro, who announced the execution.

The Colombian president, Julio Cezar Turbay, was one of the first to respond to Bitterman's death, calling it ‘vile and despicable’. The government spokesman, German Zea Hernandez, reiterated that SIL could stay on in the country until its contract was over in 1995. SIL's contract was not renewed after 2000-2002, although SIL continues to serve language groups in Colombia through other organizations. Turbay later received Bitterman's family in the Presidential Palace to offer his condolences. President Ronald Reagan sent his personal condolences to Bitterman's parents and widow. American Secretary of State, Alexander Haig also condemned the killing.

After Bitterman's death the M-19 hierarchy blamed the killing on the dissident organization, now named ‘Coordinator Nacional de Base, M-19’, at that time led by Everth Bustamante García. The wording of the declaration signed by the three leaders of M-19 (Jaime Bateman Cayón, Ivan Marino Ospina and Carlos Toledo Plata) was as follows:

'...after a thorough investigation and considering that those who executed Bitterman are militants with a warmongering and terrorist spirit towards our organization and want to lead the M-19 movement to a situation of internal war, since they have put their personal interests above the organization, we point out as directly responsible for the death of Chester Allen Bitterman the following persons: Evert Bustamante García, intellectual; Carlos Vidales Rivera, "Luis"; Jorge Rojas Sánchez, "Genaro", material author.'

Many authorities suggested it was Bustamante's organization which was holding Bitterman. This group had sent a twenty-page manifesto to the newspaper El Bogotano denouncing Bateman and, to prove its authenticity, included Bitterman's credit cards and a handwritten letter from him to his wife Brenda. Later the same organization sent her his college ring, which she identified as authentic.

‘Coordinador Nacional de Base, M-19’ had been accused of assassinating another notable personality in the same manner as Bitterman. On February 15, 1975, the president of Colombia's largest workers’ union, Jose Raquel Mercado, was killed, like Bitterman, by a single bullet to the chest fired at point-blank range. Both men had been held in a similar hideaway in Bogotá for long periods while their captors negotiated. This dissident organization had also distributed pictures of Mercado playing chess with his captors before his murder.

Bustamante's role in the Bitterman affair has never been clarified. The role of Carlos Vidales Rivera (1939-2014), a M-19 member until 1979, is unclear as well. Less is known about Jorge Rojas Sanchez (1950-1987) who was killed in his native city of Pereira. ‘Genaro’, as Rojas Sanchez was nicknamed, participated in the negotiations the last day before Bitterman died, and, by the account of the M-19 itself, was the triggerman.

Bustamante has maintained he had nothing to do with the kidnapping or murder, citing his statements to the three journalists in February 1981. In that interview Bustamante argued that the M-19 did not kidnap ordinary individuals.

In his most recent denial of involvement, published in 2016, Bustamante cited the interview as proof of his innocence. However an M-19 spokesman, during the kidnapping itself, dismissed the interview as a publicity stunt. On February 21, 1981, a week after the interview, in a call to the newspaper El Espectador, the spokesman said that the claim that the M-19 didn't have Bitterman ‘was just a "show" put on by Jaime Bateman Cayón and Bustamante, who were only interested in increasing their political standing’.

In his published denial Bustamante cites the amnesty granted him in 1990 as proof of his innocence. The law 77 of December 22, 1989, as well as the amnesty law approved three days before Bitterman's murder, excludes guerrillas involved in acts such as the killing of Mercado and Bitterman. Several authorities continue to harbor doubts as to Bustamante's involvement.

After living several years in exile in France, Bustamante emerged from the M-19 in 1990 and entered mainstream Colombian politics. He was elected senator and then mayor of Zipaquirá. Over the decades since his amnesty he has become a highly respected senior political figure in a number of Colombian administrations. But from as early as March 12, 1981, five days after the murder until as recent as 2016 and 2019 questions have been raised about his involvement.

In 1981 the periodical El Tiempo stated that: "Everth Bustamante García, alias 'Marcos' and indicated as the intellectual author of the murder, was born on July 18, 1948, in Zipaquirá; son of Vicente and Beatriz; lawyer, political leader. He has a height of 1.76 meters, dark brown complexion, citizenship card number 11.330 of Zipaquirá. He is a top leader of the M-19 and was responsible in Bogotá for the movement's internal leadership, and is apparently the grassroots coordinator. He has a long history as an activist of the Anapo Socialista and his direct contact to join the movement was Luis Francisco Otero Cifuentes. He is being tried as an absent defendant in the verbal court martial being held in La Picota."

In a letter the next day to the same periodical Bustamante denied any involvement in the Bitterman affair and placed the blame on the CIA, without providing evidence. In 2014 the periodical Semana stated that: ‘Everth Bustamante was the head of the national grassroots coordinator and it was under his leadership that the North American Chester Allan Bitterman, who was only a translator working for the Summer Institute of Linguistics, was kidnapped and murdered.’

Bustamante reacted by writing the editor of this journal claiming defamation and protesting his innocence, but again, in 2019, questions were raised about his involvement by investigative journalists at the media outlet Las2Orillas. Bustamante had clashed with Bateman. Bustamante had already been a politician in Zipaquirá before joining M-19 and would reenter Colombian politics in 1990 after receiving his amnesty for M-19 activities. Bustamante had positioned himself as a Marxist–Leninist to the left of Bateman in his early years. In later years he aligned with the rightist Colombian president Alvaro Uribe.

David Stoll, in his 1982 book Fishers of Men or Founders of Empire? The Wycliffe Bible Translators in Latin America, catalogues the controversial history of the SIL in Colombia. In reference to the Bitterman killing Stoll suggests several possible sets of actors:

Just before Bitterman's kidnapping, Cromos magazine released a poll showing that two M-19 leaders were the most popular people in the country. President Turbay was in tenth place, behind a beauty queen. Sixteen days after Bitterman's execution, Turbay claimed that M-19 forces had been trained in Cuba and broke off relations with that country, a move widely attributed to pressure from Washington.

Before and after Bitterman's death, M-19 leaders denied responsibility and blamed one faction, which also denied any connection before and after the assassination. At a meeting of the two M-19 groups on February 14, they called the communiqués in their name "false" and pointed the finger at military intelligence, perhaps even the CIA, which, they said, was trying to divide and discredit the movement. The kidnappers continued to claim to represent the M-19 faction, as did the government. As the two sides have undoubtedly infiltrated each other, the third possibility of a consortium is possible. To embarrass the M-19 and perhaps remove moralistic Bible translators and informants from para-governmental coca and marijuana plantations, for example, a provocateur might have persuaded M-19 hardliners to take the conspiracy theory to its logical conclusion. Still, if an M-19 faction actually accosted Bitterman without any para-official help, it would have found ample reason to pretend that it had not done so.

On January 24, five days after the kidnapping a spokesman at the US Embassy in Bogotá, Alfred Laun, observed that “for us, paradoxically, this type of kidnapping seems very similar to those being committed now by right-wing groups in El Salvador. Despite not having the same ideals, groups in that country and those who kidnapped the SIL associate here are acting very similarly, using almost the same methods”.

Stoll and Laun suggest that Bitterman's captors may have been another secret group—left-wing, right-wing, ultra-religious or a combination thereof—who stole M-19's identity for their own reasons. M-19 later sent condolences to Bitterman's widow and Bustamante, to his parents. Most authorities believe the preponderance of the evidence points to the M-19 or a dissident group therein, and have urged Bustamante, the only leader still alive, to reveal what he knows.

On March 9, 1982, the periodical El Tiempo reported the following:

Hugo Oswaldo Chávez Urrutia, assassin of the American linguist Chester Allen Bitterman, and 16 other guerrilla members of the M-19 high command in Bogotá, were captured by the intelligence service of the Brigade of Military Institutes, in one of the harshest blows to the subversive organization. They were identified as: Óscar José Núñez, Jorge Enrique Rodríguez Alvarez, Luis Mario Duque Rodríguez, Gustavo Restrepo González, Carlos Arturo Salamanca Villegas, Jaime Rada Duarte, Carlos Alberto Jaramillo Restrepo, Luis Augusto Medina Roa, Félix David y Pedro José Rodríguez Moreno, Luz Marina Velandia Moreno, Martha Lucía Sánchez Segura, Luz Amparo Jiménez Pérez, Alba Consuelo Ramos, Gloria Isabel Serrato de Ocampo y Carlos Mario Acevedo Martínez.After several weeks of detention, a trial was held, and several detainees were released under judicial supervision, notably Carlos Arturo Salamanca Villegas. After a year, his criminal record was cleared.

General Diaz Sanmiguel described the guerrilla who cold-bloodedly murdered Bitterman as very dangerous and identified him as Hugo Oswaldo Chavez Urrutia, alias Martin, the third most important man within the so-called National Base Coordinator of the M-19 after Heber Bustamante and Ivon Consuelo Izquierdo, alias Julia. ...the BIM commander said that he fully confessed to having assassinated the linguist Bitterman on March 7 last year when he formed the 'Manuela Beltran' column of the M-19 base coordinator. Finally, the BIM commander said that there are versions that Herber Bustamante left the country and is in some Central American nation, possibly in Cuba or Nicaragua.

Hugo Oswaldo Chávez Urrutia was later released in May, 1983 under a general amnesty for guerrillas. Bustamante reemerged in 1990 to take advantage of the amnesty granted M-19 guerrillas and became a leading Colombian politician, eventually supporting the government of Alvaro Uribe. On March 9, 1981, the Colombian government had declared that anyone associated with the Bitterman murder would not be granted amnesty. Several of the other 16 M-19 guerrillas captured were said to be involved with the kidnapping of Bitterman according to general Gustavo Matamoros but it was not stated which ones.

On March 10, 1982 El Espectador reported the following: ...of the capture of persons indicated as material authors of the murder of the North American citizen, among them an individual identified as Boris Hernando Castillo Horam, who according to 'El Espacio' of January 18 of the current year, was also a member of the so-called 'Coordinadora Nacional de Base' (National Base Coordinator).

SIL, which had previously being criticized in the Colombian press and in political and Catholic circles, received much support after the Bitterman murder. Although its contract with the Colombian government was to end in 1995, it was renewed until 2000-2002 and is still present as of 2026. Worldwide its recruitment rose by more than seventy percent in the year after Bitterman's death and financial contributions increased by 22% that year.

Memorials were built in honor of Bitterman and, to the present, he is considered by the evangelical community an example of Christ-like sacrifice. Bitterman's mother and father were received by the then Colombian President Julio Cezar Turbay, when they visited the country shortly after the murder. They stated they would forgive their son's killers and expressed a wish to visit them. Brenda Gardner Bitterman and her two daughters left Colombia the day after her husband's burial in Loma Linda. Nine months later she remarried. She and her new husband continued to work for SIL.
