= Akurio people =

Akurio
Total population
- 40 (2012)

Regions with significant populations
- Suriname

Languages
- Akurio, Trío

Religion
- traditional tribal religion

Related ethnic groups
- Trío

The Akurio or Akuriyo (Eastern Maroon Creole: Awayaikule) are an Indigenous hunter-gatherer people living in Suriname. The group were first contacted in 1938, when chanced upon by a survey party led by Willem Ahlbrinck. Ahlbrinck was on a mission to find the Ojarikoelé tribe, also known as Wajarikoele, but could not find them. A little over thirty years later in 1969, they were rediscovered by Ivan Schoen, a Protestant missionary. The people were nomadic and had a predilection for honey-gathering and the stone tools they had were typically employed for this endeavor. In 1975 American missionaries persuaded the tribe to live in Pelelu Tepu.

== Name ==
The Akurio are also called Akoerio, Akuliyo, Akuri, Akurijo, Akuriyo, Oyaricoulet, Triometesem, Triometesen, Wama, or Wayaricuri people.

== Population ==
40% to 50% of the Akurio died within two years after contact in 1969.

The population was estimated to be 50 in 2000. It fell to 40 by 2012.

== Language ==
The group used the Akurio language, also known as Akuriyó, until the late 20th century, when they began using the Trio language. Schoen had left a number of Trio Indian guides with the Akurio after their first meeting. The last native speaker is believed to have died in the first decade of the 2000s, at which time only 10 people were estimated to have Akuriyó as a second language. By 2012, only two semi-speakers remained. In December 2018, Sepi Akuriyó, one of the last surviving speakers of Akuriyó, went missing when a small plane carrying eight people disappeared during a flight over the Amazon rainforest. A search and rescue operation was called off after two weeks.
