= Carib Pidgin =

Carib Pidgin may refer to:

- The Ndyuka-Tiriyó Pidgin, a pidgin language spoken in South America
- The "men's language" spoken by the Kalinago in the Caribbean

== See also ==
- Island Carib language
