= Mark Plotkin =

American ethnobotanist

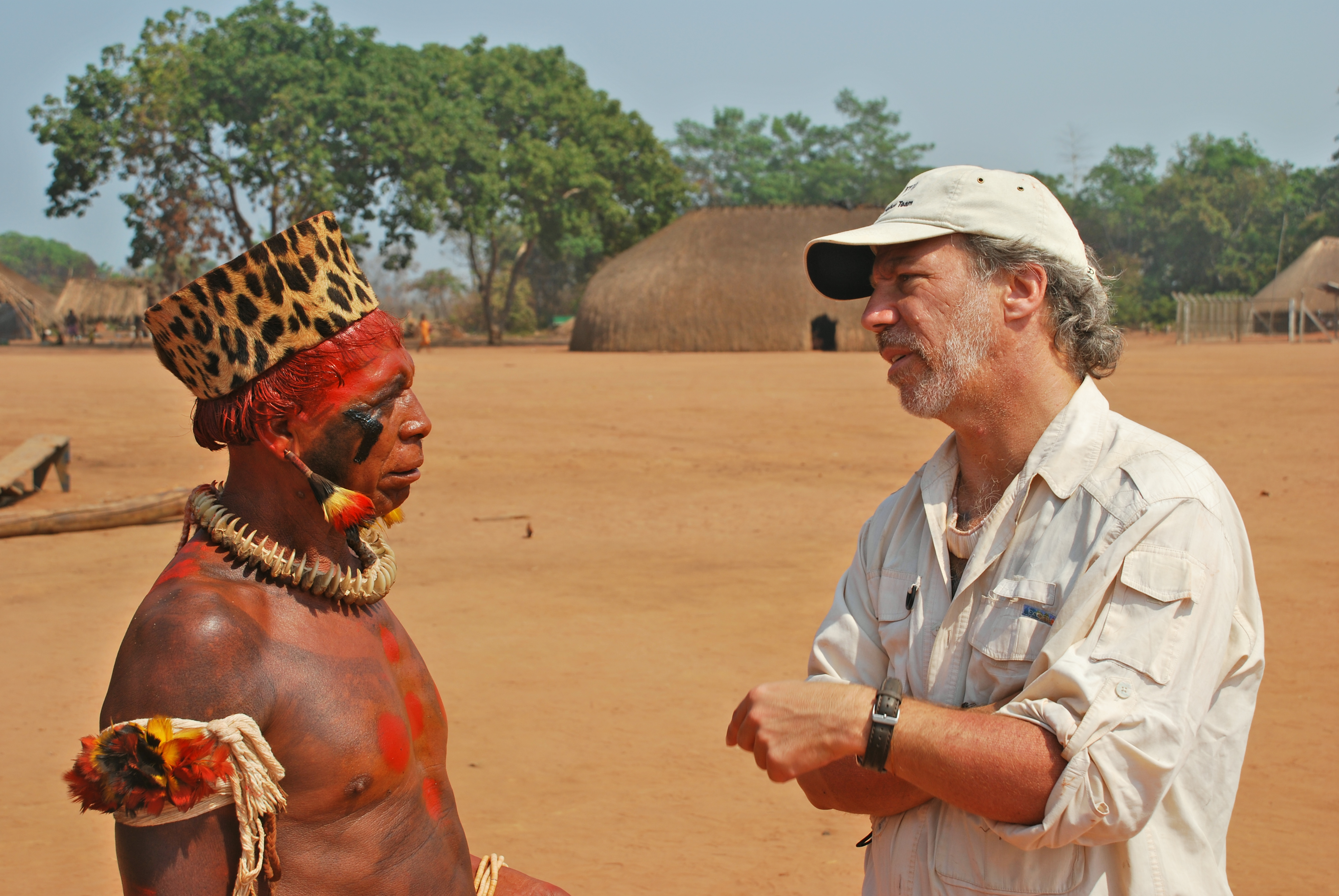
- Mark Plotkin with a Waura Chief in 2007
- Born: May 21, 1955 (age 71)
- Education: Harvard University (ALB); Yale University; Tufts University (PhD)
- Occupations: Ethnobotanist, advocate, author, and podcast host
- Known for: Tropical rainforest conservation

Mark J. Plotkin (born May 21, 1955) is an ethnobotanist and a plant explorer in the Neotropics, where he is an expert on rainforest ecosystems. Plotkin is an advocate for tropical rainforest conservation, and is the co-founder and president of the Amazon Conservation Team. He is the host of the Plants of the Gods: Hallucinogens, Healing, Culture and Conservation podcast.

== Background and career ==
After attending Isidore Newman School in New Orleans, Plotkin worked at Harvard University's Museum of Comparative Zoology when he joined an expedition searching for an elusive crocodilian species in 1978 and was galvanized into returning to education. He completed his bachelor of liberal arts degree at Harvard University's Harvard Extension School, his master's degree in forestry at Yale School of Forestry, and his Ph.D. at Tufts University; during which he completed a handbook for the Tiriyó people of Suriname detailing their own medicinal plants—the only other book printed in Tiriyó language being the Bible. He went on to do research at Harvard under Richard Evans Schultes.

In 1995, Plotkin and prominent Costa Rican conservationist Liliana Madrigal formed the Amazon Conservation Team to protect Amazonian rainforest in partnership with local indigenous peoples. ACT has now worked with 50 tribes throughout Amazonia. Plotkin continues to work with the Tirio of Suriname, and in Brazil as well. He is featured in the 1997 IMAX film Amazon, written by photojournalist Loren McIntyre.

Plotkin received the San Diego Zoo Gold Medal for Conservation (1993) and the Roy Chapman Andrews Distinguished Explorer Award (2004). Time called him an "Environmental Hero for the Planet" (2001) and Smithsonian hailed him as one of "35 Who Made a Difference" (2005), along with other notables like Bill Gates, Steven Spielberg, and fellow New Orleanian Wynton Marsalis.

In March 2008, Plotkin and Madrigal were among those chosen as "Social Entrepreneurs of the Year" by the Skoll Foundation.

In May 2010, Mark Plotkin received the honorary degree of Doctor of Humane Letters from Lewis and Clark College in Portland, Oregon. The degree citation read in part: "For teaching us that the loss of knowledge and species anywhere impoverishes us all; for combining humanitarian vision with academic rigor and moral sensibility; and for reminding us always, with clarity and passion and humor, that when we study people and plants, we are simultaneously exploring paths to philosophy, music, art, dance, reverence, and healing; Lewis and Clark is honored to confer on you today the Doctorate of Humane Letters, honoris causa." In October of the same year, the great primatologist Jane Goodall presented Mark with an award for "International Conservation Leadership."

In 2011, he was the recipient of the Yale School of Forestry Distinguished Alumni Award. In 2019, the Harvard University Extension School gave him the Shinagel Award for Public Service “in recognition of his lifelong commitment to the protection of the Amazon rainforest and the tribal communities within.

== Books ==
Tales of a Shaman's Apprentice: An account of the author's work in the Amazon rainforest tracking shamans' knowledge of curative powers of plants. The book details the potential value of these plants as well as the incredible wisdom of indigenous healers as to how these species can best be used. The book served as the basis for the multiple award-winning documentary The Shaman's Apprentice, directed by Miranda Smith.

Plotkin was interviewed in 1998 by South American Explorer magazine, just after the release of Tales of a Shaman's Apprentice and the IMAX movie Amazon:

No medical system has all the answers — no shaman that I've worked with has the equivalent of a polio vaccine, and no dermatologist that I've been to could cure a fungal infection as effectively (and inexpensively) as some of my Amazonian mentors. It shouldn't be the doctor versus the witch doctor. It should be the best aspects of all medical systems (ayurvedic, herbalism, homeopathic, and so on) combined in a way which makes health care more effective and more affordable for all.

Medicine Quest: Plotkin continues to address topics discussed in the previous work, exploring searches for new medicine from nature around the world. The new book, writes Plotkin, "is a quest powered by the desperation of the ill and the compassion of those who would cure them."

Plotkin highlights the ironic marriage of natural products, indigenous wisdom, and biotechnology. He details discoveries already providing leads in the laboratory: pain-killers from the skin of rainforest frogs, anti-coagulants from leech saliva, and anti-tumor agents from snake venom. Medicine Quest also provides background on the centuries-old pursuit of cures, ranging from the ancient Egyptians' expeditions in search of healing plants, to the 19th-century development of aspirin from willow bark and the extraction of penicillin from fungi.

The Amazon: What Everyone Needs to Know: Covers the whole Amazonian riverfront: the past, present, and future of a vast earth-supporting ecosystem. Explores the variety of life found in the Amazon, from its tiny insects to its massive canopy system. Includes information on all nine Amazonian countries, as well as the indigenous tribes.
