= Liliana Madrigal =

Liliana Madrigal (born March 23, 1957) is a conservationist who has worked toward the protection of rainforests and indigenous cultures in both Central America and South America. She is the co-founder and Senior Director of Program Operations of the Amazon Conservation Team (ACT), where she is the chief liaison to in-country programs and communities. Her primary focuses are the indigenous peoples and forests of the northwest Amazon (including the Inga, Kamsa and Cofán peoples) and the Sierra Nevada de Santa Marta (the Kogi people).

== Personal History ==
Madrigal grew up in Costa Rica and moved to Southern California in 1968. She attended the University of California, Los Angeles on scholarship where she received a Bachelor of Arts in Generative Linguistics. She currently lives in the Washington, D.C. area with her husband, ethnobotanist Dr. Mark Plotkin.

== Career ==
Madrigal began her career in conservation working under Spencer Beebe for The Nature Conservancy (TNC). She became director of TNC's Costa Rica program and worked with the National Parks Foundation of Costa Rica where she helped establish and manage some of Costa Rica's most renowned parks - notably, Manuel Antonio National Park. She later left TNC to become a founding member of Conservation International (CI) where she was director of the Costa Rica and Panama programs.

In 1996, Madrigal co-founded the Amazon Conservation Team (ACT) with Dr. Mark Plotkin. Both Madrigal and Plotkin felt that partnering closely with indigenous colleagues to protect indigenous lands represented an extraordinary conservation opportunity. Today, Madrigal oversees all program initiatives executed by ACT. She frequently visits South America to work with ACT's staff, indigenous colleagues, and partners. Madrigal focuses most heavily on Colombia where she played a vital role in the establishment of UMIYAC, the Union of Yagé Healers of Colombia. Madrigal also oversees some aspects of ACT-supported efforts in both Brazil and Suriname. She takes special interest in advancing human rights of women throughout Amazonia and drives several of ACT's women's projects.

== Awards and honors ==
- 2006: The Circle of Bridge-Makers Award from the Angeles Arrien Foundation
- 2008: Skoll Award for Social Entrepreneurship (co-awarded with Dr. Mark Plotkin)
- 2017: Rockefeller Foundation Bellagio Center Residency Program
