= Pelelu Tepu =

Village in Sipaliwini District, Suriname

Pelelu Tepu Përëru Tëpu Peleloe Tepoe
- Village
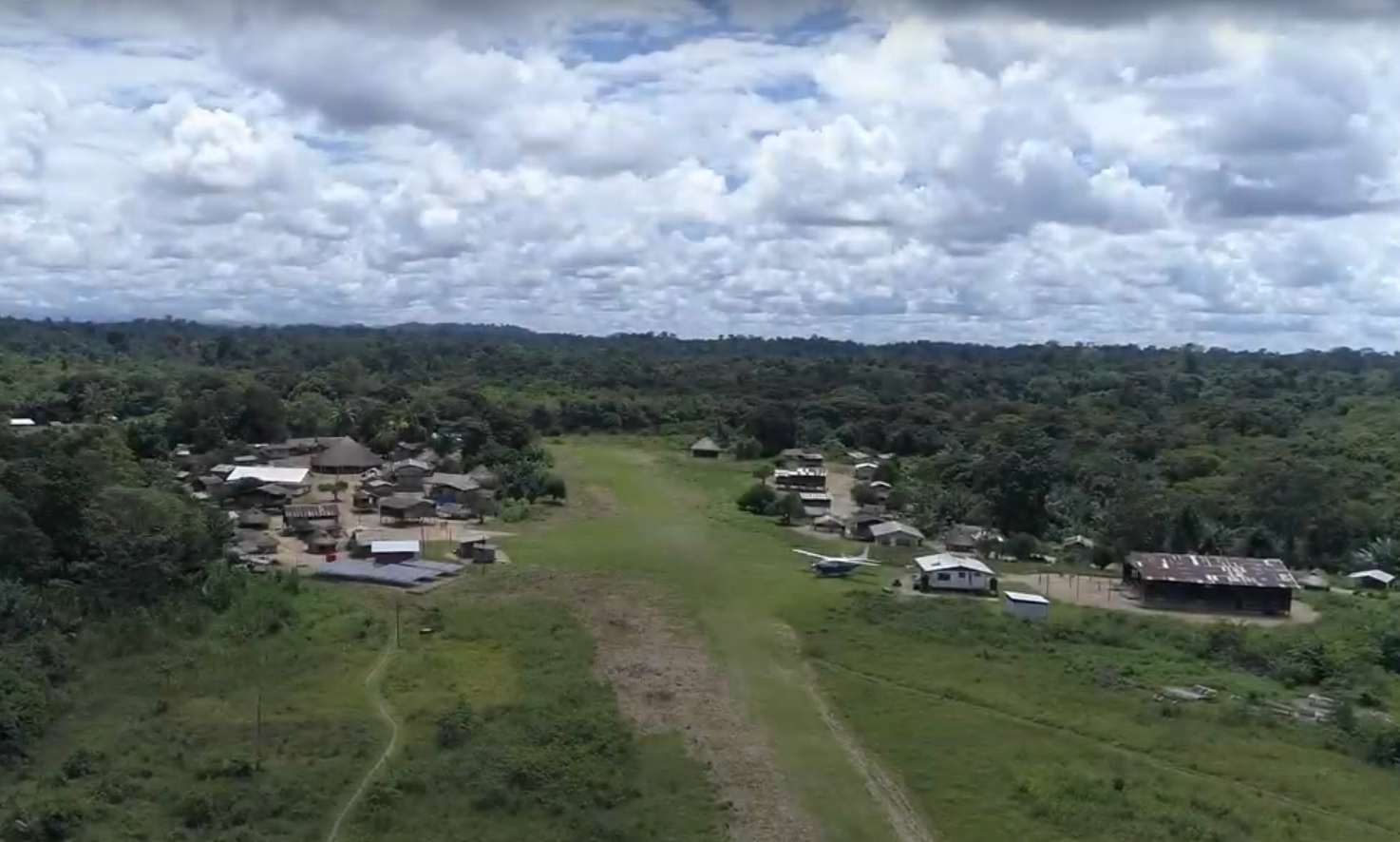

- Location in Suriname
- Coordinates: 3°9′35″N 55°43′6″W
- Country: Suriname
- District: Sipaliwini District
- Resort (municipality): Tapanahony

Government
  - Head captain: Sanaupe Moshesi

Population (2020)
  - Total: 600

Pelelu Tepu is an Amerindian village in the hinterland of Suriname. Also known as "Pe'reru Tepu", the village is typically referred to simply as "Tepu," which means "high" in the Indian Tiriyó language. The village is located on Tepu hill, on the Tapanahoni River. Though inhabited by Amerindian tribes indigenous to the area, the village was founded by Christian missionaries and (primarily) Tiriyó Indians, although it now also includes small numbers of Wayana and Akuriyo Indians. The village has a tribal organization, led by a Trio Captain.

Pelelu Tepu has a school, and electricity, however there is often no fuel to run the diesel generators. Pelelu Tepu is home to a Medische Zending healthcare centre.

== History ==
Around 1965, the Dutch colonial government and the American missionaries constructed the village. The village had a school, a church, and a medical clinic. The higher standard of living attracted many Amerindians who settled in Tëpu. In 1986 the Surinamese Interior War started. At first the Amerindians remained neutral, but later the captains agreed to a request by Desi Bouterse to receive weapons and militaries in order to train the Tëpu. In 1991, the Jungle Commando took revenge, and even though nobody was killed, most of the population fled to Brazil where many remain. In 1992, there was no indigenous population, and three people had died from starvation. The teachers refused to give up, and kept the school open.

Shaman Tëmeta Wetaru wanted to preserve the history of Tiriyó, and to give the population an incentive to learn Dutch. In 1981, he started to write and dictate Tamenta’s Testament. In 2001, a shaman apprentice school was founded in Tëpu to preserve indigenous medical knowledge.

== Energy ==
Since April 2018, the village has been powered by solar power, through a project initiated by Amazon Conservation Team Suriname and funded by the Japan-Caribbean Climate Change Partnership (J-CCCP) and UNDP. For this project, two women from Tepu completed a six-month training program as solar engineer at Barefoot College in Tilonia, India.
