= Heinz Henry Todtmann =

Heinz Henry Todtmann (March 28, 1908 in Breslau – after 1975) was a German-Jewish Journalist and NS collaborator.

== Biography ==
Heinz Todtmann was born in Breslau to Jewish merchant Max Todtmann (* 1878) and his wife Bertha Brinitzer (* 1883). In the 1930s, the family lived at Berliner Str. 28 in Berlin-Pankow. His father owned the house, operated a garage, and ran a company for ladies' coats until 1938. On March 9, 1935, Heinz Todtmann married Magda Seraphine Kabaker (* 1916) in Berlin. His parents emigrated to Los Angeles, California via Kobe, Japan on November 22, 1940. Their further fate in the United States is unknown.

Heinz and Magda Todtmann fled to Amsterdam on May 27, 1939, where he posed as a journalist. On August 7, 1939, Magda emigrated further to London, where she remarried in 1950 and died in 1993.

The evangelically baptized Heinz Todtmann was interned in the Westerbork transit camp on July 17, 1940, where he served as the Jewish adjutant to camp commander and SS-Obersturmführer Albert Konrad Gemmeker, managing Service Area I (Commandant's Office). Etty Hillesum, a contemporary witness and Auschwitz victim, described Todtmann in her diaries as “not as dangerous as [the Jewish camp leader Kurt Schlesinger], but just as corrupt and very susceptible to feminine charms.”

In the spring of 1944, Todtmann wrote the screenplay for an intended NS propaganda film about Westerbork at Gemmeker's order, although it was never completed; 75 minutes of the film have survived. The film depicted the departure of a transport to the concentration camps Auschwitz and Bergen-Belsen and idealized scenes from the camp's daily life.

The Westerbork transit camp was liberated by Canadian Forces on April 12, 1945. In 1946, a trial began against Kurt Schlesinger and other Kapoes, but it was dismissed. It is unknown if Todtmann was among the accused. As the de facto deputy head of the corrupt German-Jewish camp administration at Westerbork, Heinz Todtmann was actively involved in the deportation and murder of more than 100,000 Jews.

After the war, he continued to work as a journalist and writer. From 1947 to 1957, he worked as a freelance PR consultant in Hamburg for companies like Volkswagen AG and Mannesmann. He co-owned an advertising agency in Düsseldorf and then led the Informationsstelle Edelstahl, a joint organization of the German steel industry in Düsseldorf, as managing director until 1974.

== Works ==
- with Alfred Tritschler: Kleiner Wagen in großer Fahrt. Ein Erlebnisbericht. Burda, Offenburg in Baden 1949 (New edition: Delius Klasing, Bielefeld 2001, ISBN 3-7688-1321-5).
- with Alfred Tritschler: Die Industrie der Zauberer. Steinebach, Munich et al. 1952.
- Geboren im Feuer: Stahl. Ein Farbbilderbuch. Strache, Stuttgart 1956.
- So sehen und wissen wir mehr. C.-H.-F.-Müller-Aktiengesellschaft, Hamburg 1956.
- with Fred Schmitz: Leben und weben. Ein hundertjähriges Werk mit 250 Jahren Tuchmachertradition. 1856–1956. Bartram, Neumünster 1956.
- with Fred Schmitz: Daheim. 1907–1957. Hanseatische Druckanstalt, Hamburg 1957.
- Großes Werk für kleine Füsse. 50 Jahre Gustav Hoffmann Kleve. Hoffmann, Kleve 1958.
- Die große Ernte. Strache, Stuttgart 1961 (English: The Great Harvest. ibid 1961; Italian: La gran cosecha. ibid 1961).
- Pipelines. Ein Buch von Fernleitungen aus Stahlrohren. Franckh, Stuttgart 1962.
- Was wir tun und wie wir's machen. Beiersdorf-Aktiengesellschaft, Hamburg 1979.
