= Taranoan languages =

Language group

Taranoan
- Geographic distribution: Brazil, Suriname, Colombia
- Linguistic classification: Cariban: Guianan Carib; Taranoan
- Subdivisions: Karihona; Akurio–Tiriyó; Pauxi †; Patagón †

Language codes
- Glottolog: tara1324

The Taranoan languages are a subgroup of the Cariban language family. The languages are spoken in Brazil, Suriname, and Colombia.

== Languages ==
The Taranoan languages according to Sérgio Meira (2006) are:

- Taranoan
  - Karihona (Carijona)
    - Akuriyó
    - Tiriyó

With approximately 2,000 speakers, Tiriyó is the only language that is not close to extinction. Akuriyó and Karihona each have only a few elderly speakers left. Two extinct Taranoan languages are also mentioned, Pauxi and the poorly known Patagón.
