= Carijona =

Indigenous group of South America

Carijona are a South American Indigenous group who speak the Carijona language. They numbered in the thousands in the 1840s, but war with the Witotoans and exploitation from the rubber industry led to virtual extinction. Some live among the Correguaje, while descendants of an Afro-Colombian named Salvador Perea and a Carijona woman also survived.
