= Tiriyó language =

Cariban language of Brazil, Suriname and Guyana

Tiriyó
- Trio
- tarëno ijomi
- Pronunciation: [taɽəːnɔ ijoːmi]
- Native to: Brazil, Suriname
- Region: Pará (Baixo Amazonas mesoregion), Sipaliwini District
- Ethnicity: Tiriyó
- Native speakers: 2,100 (2003–2006)
- Language family: Cariban: Guianan Carib; Taranoan; Tiriyo languages; Tiriyó
- Dialects: Eastern; Western

Language codes
- ISO 639-3: tri – inclusive code Individual code: slj – Salumá
- Glottolog: trio1238 salu1254 Salumá (retired)
- ELP: Trió
- Linguasphere: 80-AHA-ba
- 80-AHA-bb
- 80-AHA-bd
- 80-AHA-ca
- Trio is classified as Vulnerable by the UNESCO Atlas of the World's Languages in Danger

Tiriyó (tarëno ijomi; Eastern Maroon Creole: Tiiyotongo) is the Cariban language used in everyday life by the Tiriyó people, the majority of whom are monolingual. Although Tiriyó is the preferred spelling, the Tiriyó refer to themselves as tarëno; other variations, including tarano, tirió, and trio, exist. The Tiriyó are located on both sides of the Brazil-Suriname border in Lowland South America. Because Tiriyó is spoken by the entire Tiriyó population, its level of endangerment is low. However, it may be threatened by the presence of a newly installed radar station staffed by a considerable number of non-Indigenous people close to the main village.

Ewarhuyana, listed as an unclassified language in sources, is an alternate name for Tiriyó. A supposed "Salumá" language turned out to be either Tiriyó or Waiwai.

== History ==
The modern Tiriyó is formed from various different Indigenous communities; some of these, such as the Aramixó, are mentioned in European writings as early as 1609–1610. Many of the now-Tiriyó groups lived between Brazil and French Guiana until they were driven out by the Oyampi, a Tupi-Guaranian group allied with the Portuguese. Together, the Portuguese and Oyampi drove these groups westward, and they mingled with the groups that were in the area to form the modern Tiriyó group.

As such, the Tiriyó established contact relatively early with runaway slave groups that settled in the area around the end of the 18th century. They maintained regular commercial relations with one group, the Ndyuka, and for many years they were the only contact the Tiriyó had with foreign populations. The first recorded contact between the Tiriyó and a European took place in 1843 between a "Drio" village and Robert Schomburgk; this and the meeting between French explorer Jules Crevaux and a few "Trio" were the only two points of contact between Tiriyó and Europeans in the 19th century. Subsequent contact between Europeans and Tiriyó in the first half of the twentieth century produced ethnographic and linguistic studies of the region and Tiriyó subgroups in particular. After the "exploratory phase" of contact came the "missionary phase", wherein newly built airstrips facilitated contact between missionaries and the Tiriyó. These missions tried to concentrate the Tiriyó population in larger villages to more easily convert them to Christianity, and over time, other Indigenous groups such as the Akuriyó joined them here.

Today, the Tiriyó have a high degree of independence because their settlements are difficult to access. However, they are interested in reinforcing relationships with the foreign world.

== Classification ==
Tiriyó has been classified as belonging to the Taranoan group of the Guianan sub-branch of Cariban, together with Karihona (Carijona), in Colombia, and Akuriyó, in Suriname, the former with a few, and the latter with apparently no, speakers left. Gildea (2012) lists Tiriyó and Trió as distinct languages.

== Research ==
The first wordlist of Tiriyó was compiled by Jules Crevaux in 1882, consisting of 31 entries including two sentences in Ndyuka-Tiriyó, a pidgin language. In 1909, Claudius Henricus De Goeje wrote a short grammar of Tiriyó alongside a longer wordlist of around 500 entries that he had published previously in 1904. In-depth linguistic studies of Tiriyó were not written until later in the 20th century, when Ernest Migliazza published an investigation of the phonology of Tiriyó in 1965, as did Morgan Jones in 1972. The two dialects of Tiriyó were first described in that work by Jones. A short morphological study by Ruth Wallace was published in 1980.

Sergio Meira has conducted a great deal of research into Tiriyó, including in 1997, 1998, 1999, 2000, 2005. His descriptive grammar of Tiriyó (1999) was the first major text on the language, and describes aspects of Tiriyó's phonology, morphology, syntax, and semantics. It also provides a list of words commonly borrowed into Tiriyó, and a preliminary English-Tiriyó dictionary. Eithne Carlin has also written a descriptive grammar of Tiriyó, that focuses on Tiriyó as spoken by people in Suriname. Carlin has also published other works about Tiriyó (Carlin 1997, 1999, 2003, 2006, 2011), primarily concerned with semantics and sociolinguistics.

=== Documentation ===
Tiriyó has been partially documented as part of Meira's research with the Leiden University, in conjunction with the Max Planck Institute for Psycholinguistics. This documentation began in 1993 under Dr. Spike Gildea's Northern Brazilian Cariban Languages Documentation Project, and continued through 1999. Meira's documentation included specific focus on stress patterns, contrastive demonstratives, and locative postpositions. There have been relatively few ethnographic studies on the Tiriyó, with the exception of the works by missionary Protásio Frikel and English anthropologist Peter Rivière. Between the 1950s and 1970s, Frikel wrote seven works (Frikel 1957, 1958, 1960, 1961a,b, 1964, 1971, 1973) relating to the Tiriyó. Rivière has published a number of works (Rivière 1963, 1966, 1969, 1970, 1971, 1981a,b, 1984, 1987, 1988, 1994, 1995a,b, 2000) beginning in 1963, notably Marriage Among the Trio. In his writing, he addresses errors made by Frikel.

== Dialects ==
There seem to be two main dialects in the Tiriyó-speaking area, called by Jones (1972) Eastern or Tapanahoni basin, and Western or Sipaliwini basin dialects, and by Meira (2000, to appear) K-Tiriyó and H-Tiriyó. The main difference thus far reported is phonological: the different realization of what were (historically) clusters involving /h/ and a stop. Grammatical and/or lexical differences may also exist, but the examples thus far produced are disputed.

Demographically, H-Tiriyó is the most important dialect (~ 60% of the speakers). It is the dialect spoken in the village of Kwamalasamutu, Suriname, and in the villages along the Western Paru river (Tawainen or Missão Tiriós, Kaikui Tëpu, Santo Antônio) and also along the Marapi river (Kuxare, Yawa, etc.). K-Tiriyó is spoken in the villages along the Eastern Paru river (Mataware, and some people at Bonna) in Brazil, and in the villages of Tepoe and Paloemeu in Suriname.

Tiriyo was also a basis of the Ndyuka-Tiriyó Pidgin.

== Phonology ==
Tiriyó has seven vowels and ten consonants, as shown in the chart below. (Orthographic symbols in bold, IPA values in square brackets.)

=== Vowels ===
	Front	Central	Back
Close	i ⟨i⟩	ɨ ⟨ï⟩	u ⟨u⟩
Mid	e ⟨e⟩	ə ⟨ë⟩	o ⟨o⟩
Open		a ⟨a⟩	

- The vowels (**a**, **e**, **i**, **o**, **u**) are very close to their usual values in, e.g., Spanish.
- The central vowel **ï** is usually [ɨ], but [ɯ] is also heard, especially after a velar consonant;
- The central vowel **ë** is usually [ə], but [ʌ] or [ɤ] are also common.

=== Consonants ===
	Bilabial	Dental	Palatal	Velar	Glottal
Nasal	m ⟨m⟩	n ⟨n⟩			
Plosive	p ⟨p⟩	t ⟨t⟩		k ⟨k⟩	
Fricative	ɸ ⟨hp⟩	s ⟨s⟩			h ⟨h⟩
Tap		ɾ ⟨r⟩			
Approximant	β ⟨w⟩		j ⟨j⟩		

1. The fricative /s/ shows a considerable amount of variation. Some speakers have [s], others have [ç] or [s̠], or even [ʃ]. The following vowel also influences the pronunciation of /s/: [ʃ]-like realizations are more frequent before /i/ and /e/.
2. The rhotic **r** is often retroflex ([ɽ]) and may have some laterality ([ɺ]); simple taps ([ɾ]) are also heard.
3. The approximant **w** has usually no rounding ([β̞]), and sometimes (especially if followed by **e** or **i**) some friction [β̝]
4. The glottal fricative /h/ is the most obvious difference between the two main dialects. K-Tiriyó is a dialect without /h/; where H-Tiriyó has an /h/, K-Tiriyó shows a VV sequence (realized as a long vowel). In H-Tiriyó, each **h**-cluster - **hp**, **ht**, **hk** (historically *[hp], *[ht], *[hk]) - has a different realization: [(h)ɸ], [ht], [(h)h] (i.e., with **p** and **k**, [h] is weakly realized and spirantizes the following plosive; with **t**, [h] is stronger and there is no spirantization). Older H-Tiriyó speakers have a fourth cluster **hs** [(h)s̠], with a weakly realized [h], while younger H-Tiriyó speakers have [ːs̠] ~ [s̠s̠] (K-Tiriyó speakers have only [ːs̠]); all in all, its status is, however, marginal.
  The examples in the table below illustrate these various realizations:

Proto-form	H-Tiriyó	K-Tiriyó	Gloss
*mahto	[mahtɔ]	[maatɔ]	fire
*tuhka	[tu(h)ha]	[tuuka]	Brazil nut
*pihpə	[pi(h)ɸə]	[piipə]	skin
*wɨhse	[ʋɨ(h)s̠e]~[ʋɨːs̠e]~[ʋɨs̠s̠e]	[ʋɨɨs̠e]	annatto

=== Phonotactics ===
The basic syllable template is (C_{1})V_{1}(V_{2})(C_{2}) -- i.e., the possible syllable types are:

V_{1}	V_{1}V_{2}	V_{1}C_{2}	V_{1}V_{2}C_{2}
C_{1}V_{1}	C_{1}V_{1}V_{2}	C_{1}V_{1}C_{2}	C_{1}V_{1}V_{2}C_{2}.

1. Onsetless syllables (V_{1}, V_{1}V_{2}, V_{1}C_{2}, V_{1}V_{2}C_{2}) occur only word-initially; all vowels except **ï** are possible in this position.
  Ex.: **a**ware 'caiman'; **e**nu 'his/her eye'; **ë**më 'you (sg.)'; **i**rakë 'giant ant'; **o**komo 'wasp'; **u**ru 'bread-like food'.
2. The most frequent syllable type is C_{1}V_{1}, in which all vowels and all consonants (except **h**) are possible.
  Ex.: pakoro 'house', kurija 'gourd', mïnepu 'bridge', tëpu 'stone', jako 'friend!', nërë 's/he', wewe 'wood, tree, plant'
3. Vowel sequences (V_{1}V_{2}) can be made of identical vowels (V_{1} = V_{2}), in which case they are realized as long vowels. In this case, no coda consonants are possible (i.e., no *(C_{1})VVC_{2}).
  Exs.: **aa**pë 'your arm', **ee**ke 'how?', **mëë**rë 'that one (animate)', **pii**to 'brother-in-law', **tïï**në 'quiet', **oo**to 'tree (sp.)', **muu**nu 'fish bait'.

=== Stress ===
Tiriyó stress follows a rhythmic pattern of the kind Hayes (1995) calls iambic. Phonetically:

- In (C)V-only words, every second syllable from the beginning of the word is stressed, except the final syllable, which is never stressed (extrametric).
- A non-(C)V syllable anywhere in the word attracts stress (except in the always unstressed final position) and disturbs the pattern, forcing it to restart as if a new word had begun.
- Bisyllabic words do not have obvious stress.

Examples (acute accents mark stress, and colons length):

Syllable type	Underlying form	Phonetic	Gloss
(C)V-only	/amatakana/	[a.ˈmaː.ta.ˈkaː.na]	'toucan sp.'
(C)V-only	/kɨtapotomapone/	[kɨ.ˈtaː.po.ˈtoː.ma.ˈpoː.ne]	'you all helped him/her/it'
non-(C)V-only	/mempakane/	[ˈmem.pa.ˈkaː.ne]	'you woke him/her up'
non-(C)V-only	/kehtəne/	[ˈkeh.tə.ne]	'we (I+you) were'
non-(C)V-only	/meekane/	[ˈmeː.ka.ne]	'you bit him/her/it'

Note that some words apparently follow the opposite – trochaic – pattern (e.g., /meekane/ above). For these words, an underlying sequence of identical vowels is proposed. Cognate words from related languages provide evidence for this analysis: compare the Tiriyó stem /eeka/ 'bite' with e.g. Waiwai, Katxuyana, Hixkaryana /eska/, Panare /ehka/, Karihona /eseka/, suggesting a historical process of syllable reduction with subsequent compensatory lengthening of the preceding vowel.

Since stress depends only on the type and number of syllables, morphological processes that involve syllabic prefixes or suffixes affect stress:

/pakoro/ [pa.ˈkoː.ɽo] 'house' → /ji-pakoro/ 'my house' [ji.ˈpaː.ko.ɽo]

In Hayes' framework, one could argue that stress placement is based on pairs of syllables (feet) consisting of either two (C)V (light) or one non-(C)V (heavy) syllables, except for the last syllable, which is extrametric, i.e. never forms a foot. This would explain the lack of stress in bisyllabic words: an initial light syllable, left alone by the extrametricity of the final syllable, cannot form a foot by itself and remains unstressed.

=== Reduplication ===
Reduplication in Tiriyó affects verbs (regularly) and also nouns and adverbials (irregularly: not all of them). On verbs, it usually marks iteration or repetition (e.g.: wïtëe 'I go, I am going', wïtë-wïtëe 'I keep going, I always go, I go again and again'); on nouns and adverbials, several examples of an entity, or several instances of a phenomenon (e.g.: kutuma 'painful', kuu-kuutuma 'painful all over, feeling pain all over one's body'; sikinman '(something) black', siki-sikiman-ton 'a number of black things' (including also the plural marker -ton; see below).

Formally, there are two reduplicative patterns, termed internal and external reduplication. External reduplication is a regular process that copies the first two moras of a complete word (i.e., the first two syllables if they are light, or the first syllable if it is heavy). Coda consonants are not reduplicated: the preceding vowel is copied as long (i.e. as a VV sequence). If a syllable contains two vowels, some (older?) speakers copy both vowels, while other (younger?) speakers copy only the first vowel and lengthen it (i.e. turn it into a VV sequence).

Base	Gloss	Reduplication	Gloss
wekarama	'I gave it'	weka-wekarama	'I kept giving it'
mempaka	'you woke him/her up'	mee-mempaka	'you kept waking him/her up'
waitëne	'I pushed it'	waa-waitëne, or: wai-waitëne	'I pushed it again and again'

Internal reduplication affects the interior of a word. In most cases, it can be seen as affecting the stem prior to the addition of person- or voice-marking prefixes; in some cases, however, it affects some pre-stem material as well (cf. the table below, in which '+' signs separate affixes from the stem in the first column). In many, but not all, cases, internal reduplication may result from the simplification of external reduplication: impo-imponoosewa > impo-mponoosewa. (Some examples from Carlin 2004 support this hypothesis.)

Base	Gloss	Reduplication	Gloss
im + ponoo + sewa	'not telling it' (stem: pono(pï))	i-mpo-mponoosewa	'not telling it (despite many requests)'
wi + pahka	'I hit/broke it' (stem: pahka)	wi-pah-pahka	'I hit it several times'
s + et + ainka	'I ran (away)'	se-tain-tainka	'I kept running (away)'

Finally, some cases are idiosyncratic and probably need to be listed independently (e.g., tëëkae 'bitten', 'bit', tëëkaakae 'bitten all over').

=== Morphophonology ===
There are two general morphophonological processes that have important effects on the shapes of Tiriyó morphemes: syllable reduction and ablaut.

==== Syllable reduction ====
Syllable reduction is the process whereby the final syllable of certain morphemes (mostly stems, though also sometimes affixes) is changed depending on the shape of the following element. These morphemes will typically have:

- a full or CV grade, in which the final syllable occurs in its full form;
- three reduced grades:
  - a coda or C grade, in which the final syllable is reduced to a coda consonant (n if the syllable had a nasal onset, h otherwise);
    if the reducing syllable is not nasal (NV):
  - a length or VV grade, in which the final syllable is dropped, and the preceding vowel is 'compensatorily lengthened' (becomes VV);
  - a zero grade, in which the final syllable is dropped without any changes on the preceding vowel.

The table below illustrates the various grades of the verb stems pono(pï) 'to tell O' and ona(mï) 'to bury, hide O'.

Full (CV) grade	Coda (C) grade	Length (VV) grade	Zero grade
wi-**ponopï** nkërë 'I still told O'	wi-**ponoh**-tae 'I will tell O'	wi-**ponoo**-ne 'I told O'	wi-**pono** 'I told O'
w-**onamï** nkërë 'I still hid O'	w-**onan**-tae 'I will hide O' w-**onon**-ne 'I hid O' w-**onon** 'I hid O'		

The reducing syllable can be the final one (pono(pï) 'to tell O', ona(mï) 'to bury/hide O'), or the initial one ((pï)tai 'shoes', mïta 'mouth'). The full form occurs when the following material (affix, stem, clitic) has a consonant cluster, i.e. is CCV-initial (the first consonant resyllabifies as the coda of the reducing syllable), or then starts with r. The reduced forms occur when this is not the case: the coda grade when a possible cluster – mp, nt, nk, ns, hp, hk, ht - results, and the length grade in the other cases (the zero grade for verb stems, when no clitics follow). Reducing syllables generally consist of a stop or nasal and the vowels ï or u (pï, pu, tï, tu..., mï, mu,...); rï and ru syllables can also reduce, but with some irregularities; wï syllables only reduce stem-initially (and apparently never have a coda grade).

Historically, syllable reduction results from the weakening and loss of the high vowels ï and u, leading to the formation of consonant clusters, in which the first element typically 'debuccalizes' to a glottal element (h or ʔ) and later disappears, causing (when possible) the compensatory lengthening of the preceding vowel (cf. Gildea 1995). Comparative evidence suggests that many, perhaps all, morpheme-internal clusters in the Cariban family were formed as a result of this process.

...CV.CV.CV... > ...CVC.CV... > ...CVh.CV... or ...CVʔ.CV... > ...CVV.CV...

==== Ablaut ====
In Tiriyó, as in most Cariban languages, there is a class of stems which has two forms in different morphosyntactic environments: a form which is e-initial (the e- or front grade) and a form which is ë-initial (the ë- or back grade). With nouns, for instance, the back grade occurs with the inclusive (1+2) prefix k-, the third-person coreferential ('reflexive') prefix t-, and with the non-possessed form (prefixless); all other person-marked forms have the front grade.

enu 'eye(s)'
FRONT GRADE			BACK GRADE
1	j-enu	'my eye(s)'	Non-poss	ënu	'eye(s)' (in general)
2	ë-enu	'your eye(s)'	1+2	k-ënu	'our eye(s)'
3	enu	'his/her eye(s)'	3coref	t-ënu	'his/her own eye(s)'

== Morphology ==
Tiriyó morphology is in most respects typical of the Cariban family. It is neither highly polysynthetic nor highly isolating. Tiriyó exhibits many forms of nominalization that distinguish between potential and actual agent, subject, and object as well as circumstance and event nominalizers. It marks for possession, including past possession. Verbs also have derivational morphology. They mark for past, present, and future tense, as well as for certainty, doubt, and non-factual, hypothetical, incredulative, and admonative statements. Imperatives may also be conjugated as a hortative. Tiriyó has a wide variety of adverbial forms, and a variety of postpositions including directional, locative, perlative, relational, and experiencer. These mark for person and number. Interrogatives in Tiriyó consist of nominal, non-spatial adverbial, and spatial adverbial interrogatives.

=== Pronouns ===
==== SAP pronouns ====
Person	Non-collective	Collective
1st	wɨ(ɨ)	/
2nd	emɛ	ɛmɛnjamo
1st+2nd	kɨmɛ	kɨmɛnjamo
1st+3rd	anja	anja

==== Third-person pronouns ====
	Inanimate		Animate	
	Non-collective	Collective	Non-collective	Collective
Anaphoric	irɛ	irɛto(mo)	nɛrɛ	namo
Demonstrative				
Visible:Proximal	se(nɨ)	sento(mo)	mɛe	mɛesa(mo)
	serɛ	serɛto(mo)	/	/
Medial	mɛrɛ	mɛrɛto(mo)	mɛɛrɛ	mɛɛja(mo)
Distal	Ooni	oonito(mo)	ohkɨ	ohkɨja(mo)
Invisible	mɛ(nɨ)	mɛnto(mo)	mɛ(kɨ)	mɛkɨja(mo)

There are two categories of pronouns in Tiriyó: speech act participant pronouns and the third-person pronouns. Pronouns can be subjects of transitive and intransitive sentences, as well as objects. However, pronouns cannot bear possessive morphology. The first-person pronoun, wɨ(ɨ), is unique in that it has a long vowel sound that is only heard if a clitic particle follows; as well, it does not have a derived collective form (instead, kɨmɛnjamo and anja are used). Anja is similar to third person pronouns, but is not affected by any of the semantic features that affect the rest of the third-person pronouns; thus, it is listed separately. Examples to illustrate:

wɨ j-ene
1 1.O-see:PRS.PRF
'S/he saw me.'

anja ni-tunta
1+3 3.S_{A}-arrive:PRS.PRF
'We (excl.) have arrived.'

Third-person pronouns are affected by features including visibility, proximity, and animacy. In the following example, 'who' is considered animate and 'what' is considered inanimate:

akɨ mɛkɨ
wh.AN 3.AN.INV
'Who is that?'

atɨ mɛn
wh.INAN 3.INAN.INV
'What is that?'

=== Interrogatives ===
Nominal		Adverbial	
akɨ	Animate: 'who?' (Collective: akɨ-ja(mo))	Non-spatial	
akɨ	Animate: 'who?' (Collective: akɨ-ja(mo))	eeke	'how?'
atɨ	Inanimate: 'what?'	eekanmao	'when?'
atɨ	Inanimate: 'what?'	atɨtoome	'why?'
aano	Definite: 'which?'	ahtaarɛ	'how many/how much?'
aano	Definite: 'which?'	Spatial	
		aja	'where? whither?'
		anje	'whence?'
an + simple spatial postposition:
		an-po	'where at?'
		an-pona	'where to?'
		an-pɛe	'where from?'
		an-tae	'where by?'
		an-mao	'when?'
		(...)	

Tiriyó is the only known Cariban language where almost all interrogatives begin with the letter a, similar to wh-words in English. The only exceptions, eeke and eekanmao ('how' and 'when', respectively) come from an earlier aeke. They are also the only words to be affected by the _hpe particle, an indefinite. Akɨ and atɨ have the same animacy distinction as certain pronouns; Akɨ is similar to the English who, but is used to ask about any animate being. To illustrate:

akɨ meɛ
wh.AN 3.AN.PX
'Who is this one?', 'What kind of animal is this?'

atɨ serɛ
wh.INAN 3.INAN.PX
'What is this?'

=== Possession ===
Possession in Tiriyó is denoted by the addition of a prefix that expresses the person of the possessor and a suffix that indicates possession to the stem of the noun being possessed. This suffix takes one of three forms: -ri, -hpɛ, or –ø. Nouns in Tiriyó, like in all languages, can be classified according to possessibility. Some nouns may not be possessed, others must always be. These conditions exist along a spectrum, where the majority of nouns are optionally possessible.

Nouns that are never possessed include pronouns, proper nouns, human groups, animal names, and some nominalizations. These nominalizations are: "potential" agents, objects, and subjects; generic infinitives; and adverbial nominalizers. This means that to indicate possession of an animal one must use indirect possession, where the inflection is not applied to the animal name, but to a generic noun.

j-ekɨ tonoro
1-pet bird
'My pet bird'

Nouns that are always possessed include kinship terms, generic nouns, some nominalizations, and some unclassified nouns. The nominalizations are specific infinitives and "actual" agents and objects. The unclassified nouns are a small group: arɨ 'leaf, contents'; eperu 'fruit'; epɨ 'tree, plant'; enɨ 'container'; jo(mɨ) 'wrapping'; po 'clothes'.

These groups (non-possessed, possessed) are not the majority. Most nouns in Tiriyó are optionally possessible, but to different degrees. Some nouns are usually possessed, others rarely. For example, body parts are optionally possessible – but in actuality they are almost always possessed. From Meira's 1999 Grammar:

Possessed	Unpossessed
enu 3:eye:POS 'His/her eye'	ɛnu apo eye:NPOS like 'like an eye'

Only in specific contexts like the case above can they appear unpossessed.

Other nouns that are optionally possessible include relational terms, manufactured items, and plant names. Relational terms, like body parts, are almost always possessed, e.g.:

ji-pawana
1-friend:POS
'My friend'

The other groups illuminate other parts of the continuum. Manufactured items are found equally in possessed and non-possessed forms.

Possessed	Unpossessed
kawana canoe:NPOS 'a canoe'	i-kawana 3:canoe:POS 'his/her canoe'

Nouns that are usually not possessed include plant names. Similarly to animal names, they may be indirectly possessed by means of a generic noun; however they may also be directly possessed in some cases, for example:

Indirectly possessed	Directly possessed
ji-nnapɨ {1-fruit.food cashew} 'My cashew (food)'	ɛ-joroi 2-cashew 'Your cashew (e.g. a tree)'

Meira hypothesizes that the continuum of possessibility is structured something as follows:

Always	Very often	Often	Rarely	Never
Kinship terms; Generic words; Certain nominalizers	Body parts; Human relations; Certain nominalizers	Manufactured items; Cultural items	Plants; Elements of nature	Pronouns; Proper nouns; Animals; Certain nominalizers

== Syntax ==
=== Case and agreement ===
Tiriyó belongs to the Cariban language family, whose syntax is the least understood out of all its grammatical aspects. The case marking patterns of Tiriyó are no exception to this, as they vary considerably and "almost every possible combination of participants is instantiated in some construction" – the best way to describe the language is thus to say that Tiriyo is a complicated "split-participant" system.

==== Ergative patterns ====
Ergative patterns, where the subject of an intransitive sentence and the object of a transitive sentence are marked in the same way, can be observed in certain cases: namely, in remote past clauses and "potential participant" nominalizations. When the remote past form of a verb is used, the subject of a transitive clause is marked with the postposition _:ja; the subjects of intransitive clauses and objects of transitive sentences are both unmarked. The first example below shows the marking of the transitive subject and the second shows the lack of marking of an intransitive subject:

kaikui i_jomi t-ɛta-e meri_ja
Jaguar 3-voice:POS REM-hear-REM squirrel.sp_AGT
'The squirrel heard the jaguar’s voice.'

t-eetainka-e pai
REM:S_{A}-run-REM tapir
'The tapir ran (away).'

==== Nominative patterns ====
Nominative patterns are also found throughout the language; notable examples are object-verb order sentences when the transitive subject or object are in third person, negative, supine, and habitual past form phrases. In all the above, the subjects of transitive and intransitive sentences pattern together, while the object of a transitive sentence patterns differently.

kaikui in-eta-ewa_w-ei (wɨ)
Jaguar 3.NEG-hear-NEG_1.S_{A}-COP:PRS.PRF 1
'I haven't heard the jaguar's voice.'

pahko eta-e wɨ
1:father hear-HAB 1
'I used to listen to my father.'

==== Other patterns ====
According to Sergio Meira, two other forms of case agreement exist in the language. "Split-S systems", where the subjects of intransitive verbs are sometimes marked the same way as the subjects of transitive ones, but sometimes are marked with objects instead, exist. Tripartite constructions, where subjects of transitive sentences, subjects of intransitive sentences, and objects are all marked differently, also exist in Tiriyó. Certain tenses even have more than one pattern at a time; one hypothesis to explain these variations is that the language's case marking patterns are "fossil remnants of older constructions". In other words, the different constructions within each pattern are linked because of the history of the language, not because of their meaning.

=== Tense ===
Verbs in Tiriyó distinguish between factual and non-factual moods. The non-factual mood contains hypotheticals, incredulatives, and admonitives. The factual mood contains past, present, and future events, but does not imply that the speaker is necessarily certain that an event will occur or has occurred. The tenses of Tiriyó, past; present; and future, have both perfect and imperfect forms. Non-past tenses (present and future) distinguish between certainty and doubt on the part of the speaker.

==== Past ====
The past perfective (-ne) is used to describe past events but does not convey that the events are necessarily relevant to the present. With an adverb, it carries the meaning of referring to a distant past.

tɛpɛpurunpɛpo janɨhtane
Tɛpɛpuru-PST_LOC 1.S_{O}-grow-PST.PRF
'I grew up in the (no longer extant) village of Tɛpɛpuru.'

The past imperfective (-(ja)kɛ(ne)), on the other hand, describes an unbounded event in the past, usually a habitual action. It is increasingly rare. Meira found in 1999 that many speakers characterize it as "old people's language", and do not believe it is commonly used among younger speakers. Instead, younger speakers express this state with the habitual past.

irɛmao jehkehpo wahkɛn kure
3.INAN.ANAPH_TEMP 1-hammock:POS_LOC 1.S_{A}-COP-PST.IPFV well
'I stayed/used to stay a long time in my hammock, feeling well.'

muremenkɛrɛ wɨ ahtao kutuma emaminae wɨ
child_ATTR_still 1 when a.lot play-PST.HAB 1
'When I was still a child, I used to play a lot.'

==== Present ====
The present imperfective (-(ja)-e, -(ja)-(nɛ)) is used to express ongoing progressive, habitual, or typical actions, as well as "general truths". It can also be used to talk about the immediate future, although this is not its most common use.

tunuku wɨkaajae
basket 1.A-weave-PRS.IPFV-CTY
'I am making a basket'

wei wararɛ jurakanae
day every 1.A-stroll:PRS.IPFV-CTY
'I go walking around every day'

kokoronmae
1.2.A.O-help:PRS.IPFV-CTY
'I am going to help you'

The present perfective (ø) expresses an action that has been completed very recently, and is still relevant to the present. For example,

anjapa nepɨ
1+3_RPT 3.S_{A}-come:PRS.PRF
'We have just come back'

==== Future ====
Perfect and imperfect in the future are used to distinguish actions that have a limited duration and actions that are not limited. The future imperfect (-ta-e, -ta-(ne)) is the more common form, and is used to express a potential future action that does not have durational limits.

konopo nehtan kokoro
rain 3.S_{A}-come-FUT.IPFV-DBT tomorrow
'It will rain tomorrow'

The perfect future tense (-(ja)-kɛ(mɨ)) emphasizes that a future event will only last for a short amount of time, and implies that afterwards another event will take place.

ɛturɛɛpa wɨtɛɛkɛn
talk-Prp_RPT 1.S_{A}-go-FUT.PRF
'I will go and talk (to him) for a minute (, and then I will come back)'

Future perfective is not the only way of representing temporary future events. Speakers of Tiriyó may also use the present imperfective, along with a particle _pitɛ (for a second).

Future perfective		Present imperfective
wɨtɛɛkɛn	akɛɛrɛ	wɨtɛepitɛ	akɛɛrɛ
1.S_{A}-go-Fut.Prf	3:with	1.S_{A}-go-:Prs.Ipf-Cty_a.little	3:with
'I will go with him for a little while (, and then I will do something else)'

These phrases have the same functional meaning, and both are acceptable; however using the present imperfective with the particle _pitɛ is more common. This construction is potentially replacing the future perfective.

==== Certainty and doubt ====
In present and future tenses, Tiriyó distinguish between things the speaker is certain of and things they are not. This distinction, represented as suffixes –e for certainty and –ne or –nɛ for doubt, is not present in collective forms. To use the certain form, a speaker must have absolute confidence in an event. For example, if there are rainclouds in the sky visible to both speaker and addressee and the speaker would like to say that it will rain, they must use the doubt form.

nehtan konopo
3.A.O-come-FUT-IPFV-DBT rain
'The rain will come'

The certainty and doubt forms do not express the source of the information; they are not evidentials. They communicate how confident a speaker is in their assessment of a situation.
