= Ndyuka-Tiriyó Pidgin =

Pre-1960s pidgin language of Suriname

- Native to: Suriname
- Region: upper Tapanahoni River
- Era: until the 1960s. Used rarely now; never a first language.
- Language family: Ndyuka–Tiriyó pidgin

Language codes
- ISO 639-3: njt
- Glottolog: ndyu1241 Ndyuka-Trio joek1234 Ndyuka-Wayana
- ELP: Ndyuka-Trio Pidgin

Ndyuka-Tiriyó Pidgin (Ndyuka-Trio) was a trade language used until the 1960s between speakers of Ndyuka, an English-based creole, and Tiriyó and Wayana, both Cariban languages.
