= Y. Michel Rabbinowicz =

Y. Michel Rabbinowicz (Breslau 1892) was a rabbinic author and lecturer.

Rabbinowicz was noted for authoring a French-language translation of several parts of the Babylonian Talmud. Moses Mielziner compared Rabbinowicz's style of omitting subordinate material to that of Isaac Alfasi.
