= Adolf Wuttke =

German Protestant theologian (1819–1870)

Karl Friedrich Adolf Wuttke (10 November 1819 – 12 April 1870) was a German Protestant theologian.

== Biography ==
He was born in Breslau (Wrocław). He studied theology at Breslau, Berlin and Halle, where he eventually became professor ordinarius.

== Works ==
He is known as the author of a treatise on Christian ethics (Handbuch der christlichen Sittenlehre, 1860-1863) and works on heathen religion (Die Geschichte des Heidentums, 1851-1853) and superstition (Der deutsche Volksaberglaube der Gegenwart, 1865).
