= W. E. Scholz =

German composer and conductor (1807 or 1808 – 1866)

W. E. Scholz (1807 or 1808 – September 1866) was a German composer and Kapellmeister / conductor at the court of Prince August zu Hohenlohe-Öhringen in Schlawentzitz in Upper Silesia.

== Life ==
Wilhelm Eduard Scholz was born in Breslau. He was a pupil of Ignaz von Seyfried in Vienna. In 1838 he was appointed Kapellmeister of the Prince zu Hohenlohe-Öhringen at the court in Schlawentzitz in Upper Silesia. Most of his compositions – autographs of his works, autographs of the arrangements and prints – are now in the Hohenlohe-Zentralarchiv Neuenstein.

He composed overtures, symphonies, sonatas, instrumental concertos, masses, art songs and harmony music. He also arranged well-known works for the Hofkapelle in Schlawentzitz. For example Wolfgang Amadeus Mozart's Don Giovanni, Carl Maria von Weber's Oberon and Euryanthe, Gioachino Rossini's Guillaume Tell and Otello, Ludwig van Beethoven's Fidelio and Symphony No. 5, Giuseppe Verdi's Macbeth, Felix Mendelssohn Bartholdy's A Midsummer Night's Dream and Frédéric Chopin's Waltz in E-flat major.

During his lifetime several of his compositions were published by F. E. C. Leuckart Verlag and Weinhold. The composer's main tenure dates back to the first half of the nineteenth century as evidenced by some autographs. In the 19th century the works of Scholz were acknowledged in the music magazines.

The Musikalisches Conversationslexikon (1840) describes him as a talented composer. He died in the city of his birth, Breslau.

== Works (autographs, selection) ==
- Ouvertura No 2 par Scholz 1832 (incomplete)
- Fest Polonaise composed by W. E. Scholz Breslau, 12 January 1834. (incomplete)
- Fest-Overture composed for a large orchestra, arranged for the Fürstlich Hohenlohe-Öhring'sche Hofkapelle by W. E. Scholz, no. 4; Slaventzitz, October 6, 1838; Op. 17; Ms. 1838/39 Scholz.
- No 4. Ouverture to the opera Comet by W. E. Scholz 02.03.1839 (incomplete)
- March 12 March 1839 (incomplete)
- Concert for Tuba und Orchestra
- Concert for Oboe F major Schlawentzitz, December 1842
- Concert for Clarinet
- Adagio and Rondo for Flute and Orchestra (incomplete)
- Scherzo (incomplete)
- Vier Lieder (Winternacht, Wanderlied, Wär' ich ein Nachtigall, Mein Reichtum) for voice and orchestra (incomplete)

== Instrumental concertos ==
The scores of the composer's complete instrumental compositions (trombone, oboe and clarinet concertos) were prepared in 2016 by Stefan Antweiler from the instrumental parts and published as first editions by Are Musikverlag Mainz.
