= Kurt Schlesinger =

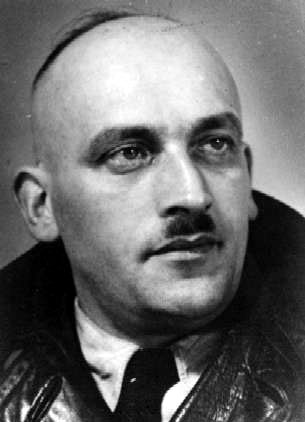
Schlesinger around 1942

Kurt Schlesinger (17 December 1902 – 3 August 1963) was a German Jewish administrative director of Westerbork transit camp during World War II.

== Early life ==
Kurt Schlesinger lived in his hometown Schmalkalden until 1939. He married Thea Francis Klein from Nuremberg in 1937. After he was threatened during the Crystal Night, the pair fled to Amsterdam on 12 January 1939, where they were quarantined until the end of the year.

== Collaborator ==
On 6 March 1940, the couple were interned in the Westerbork transit camp, where they were initially obliged to work as miners.

In February 1942, Schlesinger was promoted to Chief Service Officer of the Jewish Security Service. His deputy was Heinz Todtmann, the head of service area I (command office). Schlesinger's main task was to administer the prisoner index and the production of the deportation lists for the transports of the Jews, Sinti, and Roma to Auschwitz, Sobibor, and the Theresienstadt. Since the first inmates of Westerbork were predominantly German Jews and therefore most of the security service as well, Schlesinger took advantage of his leadership position to protect his compatriots from deportation and to prioritize Dutch Jewish inmates for the deportation lists.

Schlesinger dressed like an "overly Prussian": He wore breeches, boots, a leather coat and an officer's cap. He regularly took money, valuables and sexual favors in exchange for protection from deportation or for a "better" deportation destination, such as Theresienstadt instead of Auschwitz. He managed the black market in the camp and ordered the deportation of competing prisoners. Etty Hillesum, a contemporary witness and Auschwitz victim, described Schlesinger as "the right hand" of the camp commandant SS-Obersturmführer Albert Konrad Gemmeker. On deportation days, he and the SS guards appeared on the platform to supervise the transports. Adolf Eichmann said of the Dutch deportations at his trial in 1961: "The trains ran like a dream."

On 11 April 1945, Gemmeker transferred the camp management to Oberdienstleiter Schlesinger, who on the same day handed it over to Adrianus van As, a non-Jew who had been in charge of food management in the camp since 1942. The Westerbork transit camp was liberated the next day by Canadian Army troops. The SS had destroyed the deportation lists in the days before, but Schlesinger hid a copy of them and gave them to the Allies. In 1946, proceedings against Schlesinger and other prisoner functionaries began, but were stopped. In the 1949 Gemmeker trial before the Leeuwarden Special Court, where defense witness Schlesinger testified on his behalf.

== Flight ==
Schlesinger and his wife Thea emigrated by ship from Rotterdam to New York on 19 January 1951. Schlesinger's location was only found out in 1973 by investigators in the second trial against Gemmeker. According to his wife, Schlesinger died in 1964. In addition, Thea Schlesinger refused to testify against Gemmeker in the German consulate. She died in 2002 in Jacksonville, Florida.

As a prison officer of the corrupt German Jewish security service at the Westerbork transit camp, Schlesinger is considered to have been actively involved in the deportation and murder of more than 100,000 Jews.
