= Las2orillas =

Colombian news website

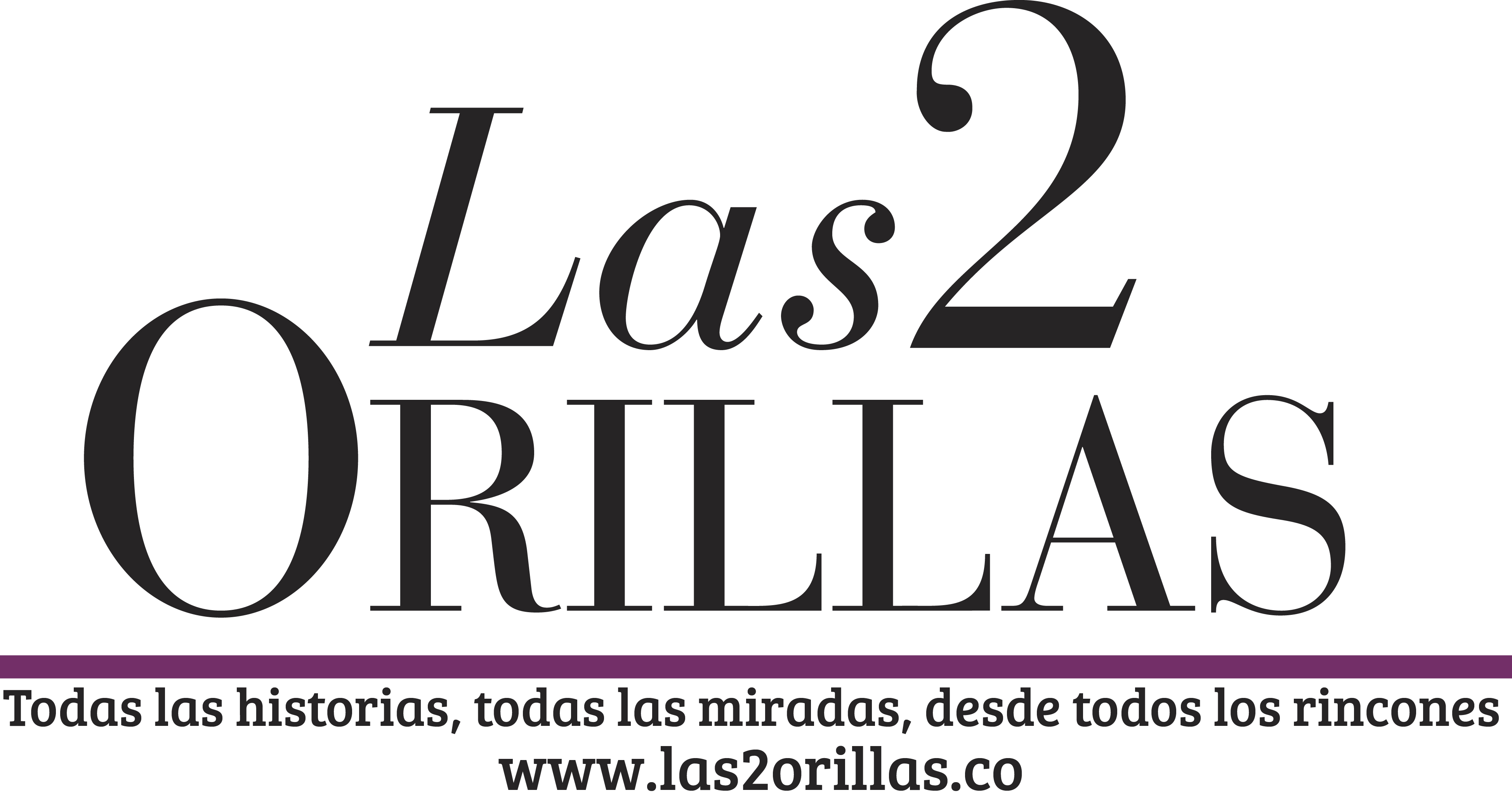
- Website type: News & blogging
- Available in: Spanish
- Headquarters: Bogotá, {{{location_country}}}
- Founders: María Elvira Bonilla, Rafael Santos, Alonso Salazar, Marta Ruiz, Natalia Orozco, Jorge Enrique Botero, Margarita Londoño, Adriana Mejía, Sergio Álvarez and León Valencia
- Website: https://www.las2orillas.co/
- Launched: June 13, 2013
- Current status: Active

Las2orillas is a Colombian news website founded in 2013; its director is María Elvira Bonilla. The website has a section called "Nota Ciudadana", which consists entirely on user-generated content.

In March 2015, the Colombian newspaper La República reported that Las2Orillas had 3.2 million unique users per month.
