= Protásio Frikel =

German-Brazilian anthropologist (1912–1974)

Günther Protásio Frikel
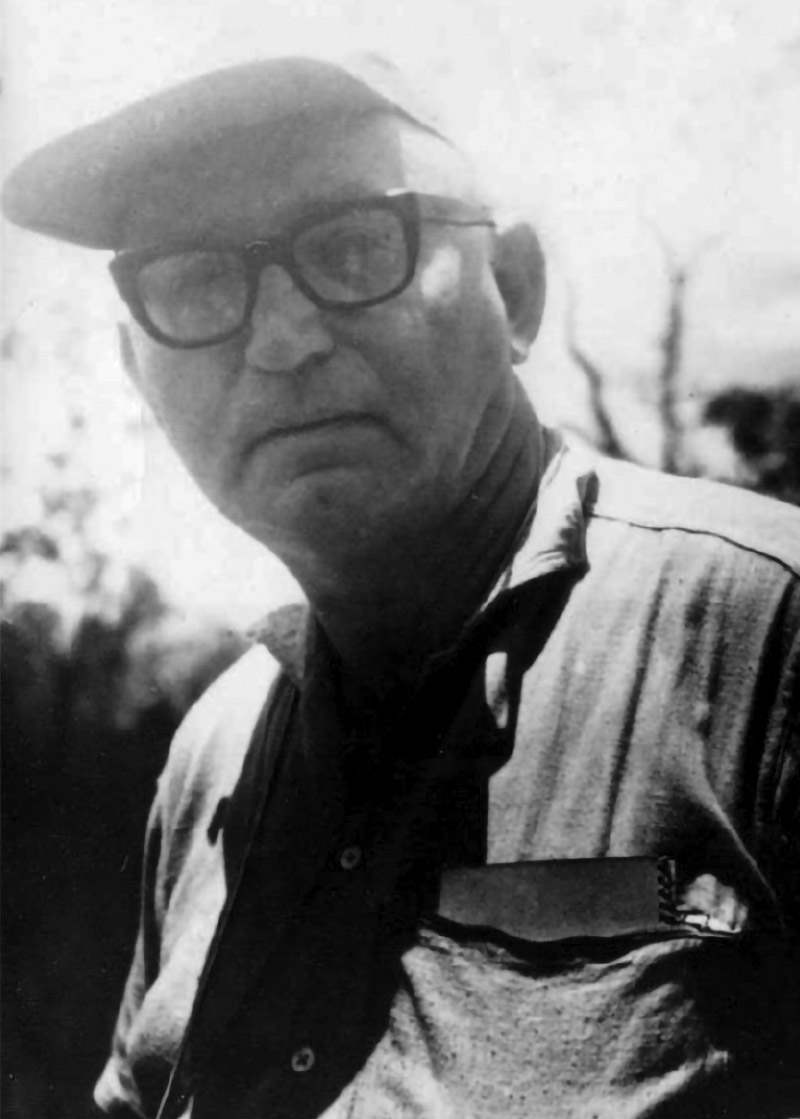
- Born: Günther Frikel; 24 March 1912; Breslau, Kingdom of Prussia, German Empire
- Died: 27 September 1974 (aged 62); Belém do Pará, Pará, Brazil

Günther Protásio Frikel (24 March 1912 – 27 September 1974), better known as Protásio Frikel, was a German-Brazilian anthropologist and a Franciscan missionary. Frikel conducted extensive field research amongst the Indigenous peoples of North Brazil, especially the Tiriyó people of whom he visited extensively over 20 years. Frikel's research led to the creation of the Parque Indígena Tumucumaque, an indigenous territory for the Tiriyó.

== Early life and education ==
Frikel was born in Breslau (modern-day Wrocław, Poland) on 24 March 1912. His father was a watchmaker. Frikel studied science in Gymnasium at the Bardel Franciscan Monastery in modern-day Lower Saxony after completing his primary and secondary schooling in Breslau.

In 1931, Frikel traveled to Recife, Brazil, to become a priest and Franciscan missionary in the Amazon. Frikel studied in Olinda from 1931 to 1933, then continued his studies in Salvador, where he was ordained in 1937. Frikel studied theology, philosophy, sociology, psychology, and history. During his studies, Frikel developed an interest in anthropology, Brazilian ethnology, and Afro-Brazilian religions, particularly Candomblé as practiced in Bahia. His first publication, Die Seelenleehre der Gege und Nagô (The soul doctrine of the Gege and Nagô), was published in 1941 in the Franscian publication, Revista dos Franciscanos, and was about anthropology.

== Missionary work ==
In 1938, Frikel was assigned to the Territorial Prelature of Santarém, where he served in several parishes until 1957, including Santarém, which administered the mission stations of Alenquer, Óbidos, Faro, Oriximiná, and Juruti. Frikel established a relationship with the Anthropology Department at the Museu Paraense Emílio Goeldi (MPEG) in Belém do Pará. As a missionary, Frikel traveled throughout northern Pará and conducted masses, baptisms, weddings, and funerals for the people and communities that he encountered. Frikel conducted missionary work amongst the Munduruku people in the Alto Tapajós region. He also established Missão Tiriyó, a mission in the Amapa-Para border region.

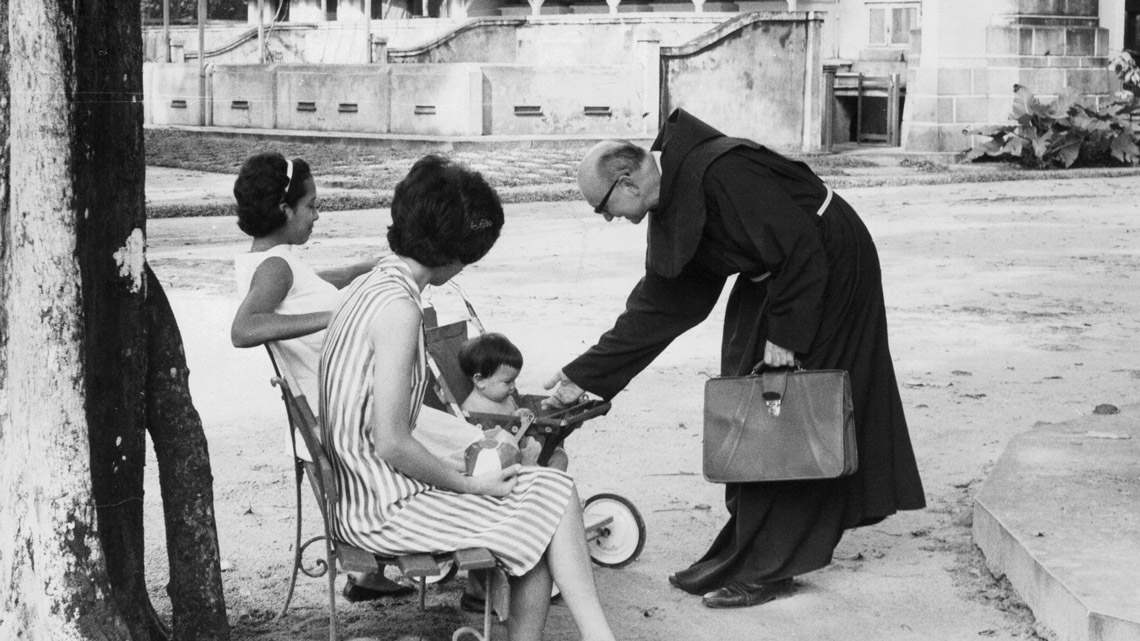
Frikel, as a Franciscan missionary, playing with a baby at a zoo run by the Goeldi Museum.

While serving as a missionary, Frikel pursued his anthropological interests by collecting material and noting observations about the people he served. He encountered and documented several archaeological sites, such as sambaquis and terra preta mounds, and indigenous communities along the banks of the many tributaries of the Amazon River. Beginning in 1944, Frikel shifted his focus from missionary work to ethnographic fieldwork. During his first expedition conducted from November to December in 1944, Frikel met the Kaxuyana people along the Cachorro River. Frikel attempted to make contact with other indigenous groups in the region, such as the Kahyana and Parukoto people. In 1949, Frikel met members of the Tiriyó people for the first time and developed an intense interest in their culture. In 1950, Frikel visited the Tiriyó for the first time.

Frikel visited many communities and was noted by Lucia Hussak van Velthem, a colleague at the MPEG, to have "visited virtually all of the remote and difficult-to-access indigenous villages in northern Pará". Frikel is known to have made contact with the Kaxuyana, Parukotó, Wayana, Aparaí, and Tiriyó people. In a 1957 publication, Frikel mentions that he's encountered over 30 distinct indigenous communities such as the Aramayana, the Maraxó, and the Okómoyana who are broadly lumped together as the Tiriyó people. Frikel also studied the Mocambeiros, the descendants of enslaved Africans who escaped slavery and sought refuge as maroons along the Trombetas, Curuá, and Cuminá rivers in Pará.

== Shift to anthropological research ==
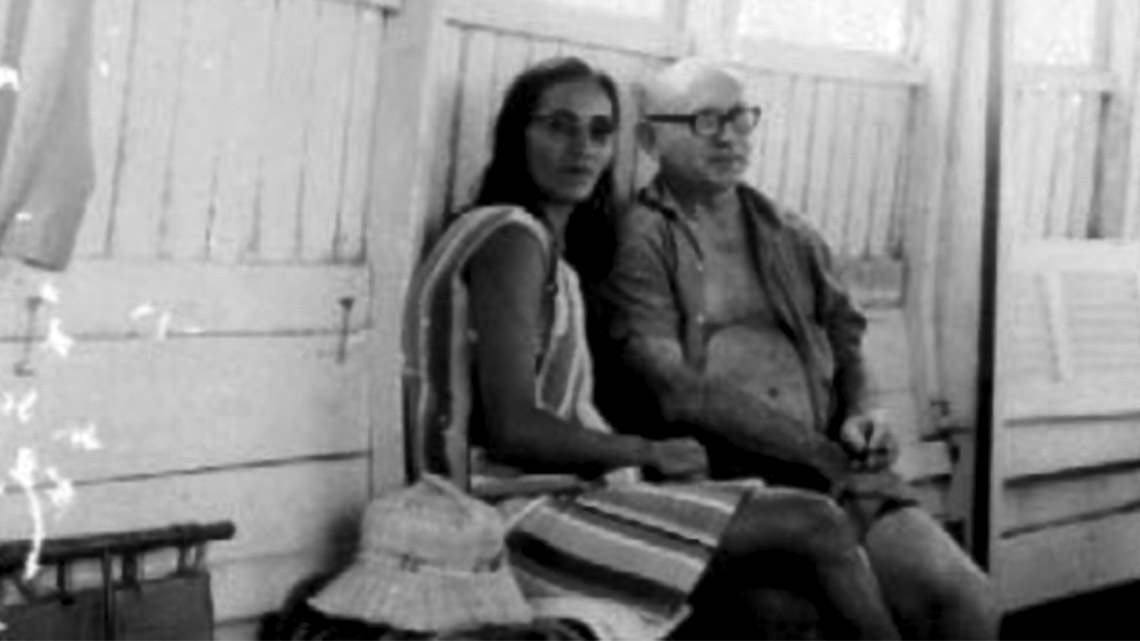
Frikel with his wife, Marlene, on a boat near the indigenous village of Catté, Pará, in 1963.

In 1963, Frikel became a Brazilian citizen and joined the MPEG. (Note: One source says he joined as a scientist in the anthropological department, whereas another says his joined as an anthropologist.) That same year, Frikel left the Franciscan order to focus on his anthropological research. Frikel later became an alternate director of the Anthropology Department at the MPEG. He later married Marlene, who accompanied him on numerous field trips to Indigenous communities to conduct anthropological research.

German anthropologist Hans Becher notes that Frikel's most notable work was on the culture and traditions of the Tiriyó. From 1940 to 1974, Frikel made 13 trips to different Tiriyó communities to study their language and culture. Over his many visits to their communities, Frikel documented how the Tiriyó way of life changed through contact with outsiders. Despite initially being a Franciscan priest, Frikel was critical of evangelization missions to indigenous Brazilians and believed that "no mission has the right to detach the Indian [sic] from his traditions". His research contributed to the creation of the Parque Indígena Tumucumaque, an indigenous territory for the Tiriyó, in 1968 or 1969.

Frikel collected newly made items created by indigenous people for trade and sale for museums in Austria, Germany, Denmark, and Sweden.

== Death and legacy ==
Frikel passed away on 27 September 1974 in Belém do Pará. His widow Marlene da Silva Frikel sold Frikel's anthropological findings to his former colleagues to financially support herself. As of 2017, the majority of Frikel's legacy can be found at MPEG, the Landesmuseum Hannover (NLMH) in Hanover, Germany, and the Museum of Archeology and Ethnology of the University of São Paulo. As of 2017, objects gathered by Frikel can be found at MPEG, the Museu do Ipiranga in São Paulo, Brazil, the Museum am Rothenbaum in Hamburg, Germany, and NLMH. The MPEG collection consisted of over 2,600 objects from over 15 different indigenous groups.

As of 2021, the MPEG had boxes with around 50,000 archaeological items collected by Frikel throughout Pará and Amazonas. In 2006, Brazilian researchers found that over 90% of the items had not yet been analyzed.

== Academic works ==
Frikel was a member of nine academic associations: the Associação Brasileira de Antropologia, Current Anthropology, the New York Academy of Sciences, the Swiss Society of Americanists, the American Anthropological Association, the Instituto de Antropologia e Etnología do Para, the Instituto Brasileiro de Educação, Ciência e Cultura, Ethnologische Gesellschaft Hannover, and the Institute for Encyclopedia of Human Ideas on Ultimate Reality and Meaning.

=== Publications ===
Selected works include:

- Frikel, G. P. (1953). "Kamani: costumes e preceitos dos índios Kachúyana a respeito do curare" [Kamani: Customs and Precepts of the Kachúyana Indians concerning Curare] (PDF). Revista do Museu Paulista (in Portuguese). VII. São Paulo: 257–274.
- Frikel, Protásio (1955). "Tradições histórico-lendárias dos Kachuyana e Kah.yana" [Historical–Legendary Traditions of the Kachuyana and Kahyana] (PDF). Revista do Museu Paulista. 9: 203–233.
- Frikel, Protasius (1957). "Zur linguistisch-ethnologischen Gliederung der Indianerstämme von Nord-Pará (Brasilien) und den anliegenden Gebieten" [On the Linguistic–Ethnological Classification of the Indian Tribes of Northern Pará (Brazil)] (PDF). Anthropos (in German). 3./4. (52): 509–563.
- Frikel, Protásio (1958). "Classificação lingüístico-etnológica das tribos indígenas do Pará setentrional e zonas adjacentes" [Linguistic–Ethnological Classification of the Indigenous Tribes of Northern Pará and Adjacent Areas] (PDF). Revista de Antropologia (in Portuguese). 6 (2:1): 13–89.
- Frikel, Protásio (July 1959). "Agricultura dos índios Mundurukú" [Agriculture of the Mundurukú Indians] (PDF). Boletim do Museu Paraense Emílio Goeldi (in Portuguese) 4: 1–35.
- Frikel, Protásio (February 1960). "Os Tiriyó (Notas preliminares)" [The Tiriyó (Preliminary Notes)] (PDF). Boletim do Museu Paraense Emílio Goeldi (in Portuguese) 9. Belém, Pará: 1–19.
- Frikel, Protásio (November 1961). "Fases culturais e aculturação intertribal no Tumucumaque" [Cultural Phases and Intertribal Acculturation in the Tumucumaque] (PDF). Boletim do Museu Paraense Emílio Goeldi (in Portuguese) 16. Belém, Pará: 1–18.
- Frikel, Protásio (December 1961). "Ometanímpe, os "transformados"" [Ometanímpe, the "Transformed Ones"] (PDF). Boletim do Museu Paraense Emílio Goeldi (in Portuguese) 17. Belém, Pará: 1–15.
- Frikel, Protásio (1963). "Tradição tribal e arqueologia no Tumucumaque" [Tribal Tradition and Archaeology in the Tumucumaque] (PDF). Revista do Museu Paulista. XIV: 471–491.
- Frikel, Protásio (1964). Das Problem der Pianakotó-Tiriyó [The Problem of the Pianakotó-Tiriyó] (PDF) (in German). pp. 97–104.
- Frikel, Protásio (1964). "Traços da doutrina gêge e nagôu sôbre a crença na alma" [Traces of the Gêge and Nagô Doctrine on the Belief in the Soul] (PDF). Revista de Antropologia (in Portuguese). 12 (1–2): 51–81.
- Frikel, Protásio (1966). "Os últimos Káhyana" [The Last Káhyana] (PDF). Revista do Instituto de Estudos Brasileiros (in Portuguese). 1. Belém, Pará: 7–34.
- Frikel, Protásio (1968). Os Xikrín: Equipamento e técnicas de subsistência [The Xikrín: Equipment and Subsistence Techniques] (PDF). Publicações Avulsas Nº 7 (in Portuguese). Belém, Pará: Museu Paraense Emílio Goeldi. pp. 1–119.
- Frikel, Protásio (1969). "Tradition und Archäologie im Tumuk-Humak/Nordbrasilien" [Tradition and Archaeology in the Tumuk-Humak/Northern Brazil] (PDF). Zeitschrift für Ethnologie (in German). 1 (94): 103–130.
- Frikel, Protásio (1969–1972). "Migração, guerra e sobrevivência Suiá" [Migration, War, and Survival of the Suiá] (PDF). Revista de Antropologia (in Portuguese). 17/20 (1): 105–136.
- Frikel, Protásio (1970). Os Kaxúyana: notas etno-históricas [The Kaxúyana: Ethnohistorical Notes] (PDF). Publicações Avulsas Nº 14 (in Portuguese). Belém, Pará: Museu Paraense Emílio Goeldi.
- Frikel, Protásio (1971). Gudschinsky, Sarah C. (ed.). "A mitologia solar e a filosofia de vida dos índios Kaxúyana. Tentativa de uma interpretação" [The Solar Mythology and Philosophy of Life of the Kaxúyana Indians: An Attempt at an Interpretation] (PDF). Estudos sôbre línguas e culturas indígenas: Trabalhos linguísticos realizados no Brasil (edição especial) (in Portuguese) (4). Brasília: Instituto Lingüístico de Verão: 103–142.
- Frikel, Protásio (1971). Dez anos de aculturação Tiriyó: 1960-70. Mudanças e problemas [Ten Years of Tiriyó Acculturation: 1960–70. Changes and Problems] (PDF). Publicações Avulsas Nº 16 (in Portuguese). Museu Paraense Emílio Goeldi.
- Frikel, Protásio (1971). "O "código de civilidade" Kaxúyana" [The Kaxúyana “Code of Civility”] (PDF). Universitas: Revista de Cultura da Universidade Federal da Bahia (in Portuguese). Salvador, Federal University of Bahia: 277–294.
- Frikel, Protásio; Cortez, Roberto (1972). Elementos demográficos do Alto Paru de Oeste, Tumucumaque Brasileiro (Índios Ewarhoyána, Kaxúyana e Tiriyó) [Demographic Elements of the Upper Western Paru, Brazilian Tumucumaque (Ewarhoyána, Kaxúyana, and Tiriyó natives)] (PDF). Publicações Avulsas Nº 19 (in Portuguese). Belém, Pará: Museu Paraense Emílio Goeldi.
- Frikel, Protásio (1973). Os Tiriyó: seu sistema adaptativo [The Tiriyó: Their Adaptive System] (PDF) (in Portuguese).
- Cavalcante, Paulo B.; Frikel, Protásio (1973). A farmacopéia Tiriyó: Estudo etno-botânico [The Tiriyó Pharmacopoeia: An Ethnobotanical Study] (PDF) (in Portuguese).
- Frikel, Protásio (1976). "Sinais e marcos de orientação e advertência indígenas" [Indigenous Orientation and Warning Signs and Markers] (PDF). In Schaden, Egon (ed.). Leituras de etnologia brasileira [Readings in Brazilian ethnology] (PDF) (in Portuguese). São Paulo: Companhia Editora Nacional. pp. 340–348.
- Frikel, Protásio (1976). "Notas sôbre a situação atual dos índios Xikrin do rio Caeteté" [Notes on the Current Situation of the Xikrin Indians of the Caeteté River] (PDF). In Schaden, Egon (ed.). Leituras de etnologia brasileira [Readings in Brazilian ethnology] (in Portuguese). São Paulo: Companhia Editora Nacional. pp. 435–447.
- Frikel, Protásio (1976). "Morí — A festa do rapé : Índios Kachúyana; rio Trombetas" [Morí, the Snuff Festival (Kaxúyana Indians, Trombetas River)] (PDF). In Coelho, Vera Penteado (ed.). Os alucinógenos e o mundo simbólico : O uso dos alucinógenos entre os índios da América do Sul [Hallucinogens and the symbolic world: The use of hallucinogens among the indigenous peoples of South America] (PDF) (in Portuguese). São Paulo: Editora da Universidade de São Paulo. pp. 29–58.
- Frikel, Protásio (1978). "Áreas de arboricultura pré-agrícola na Amazônia: Notas preliminares" [Areas of Pre-Agricultural Arboriculture in the Amazon: Preliminary Notes] (PDF). Revista de Antropologia (in Portuguese). 21 (1): 45–52.
