= Carijona language =

Endangered Cariban language spoken in Colombia

Carijona
- Hianacoto
- Tsahá
- Native to: Colombia
- Ethnicity: 290 Carijona (2007)
- Native speakers: 15 (2015)
- Language family: Cariban: Guianan Carib; Taranoan; Carijona
- Dialects: Hianacoto; Karihona; Umaua; Guaque

Language codes
- ISO 639-3: cbd
- Glottolog: cari1279
- ELP: Carijona
- Linguasphere: 80-AHA-a
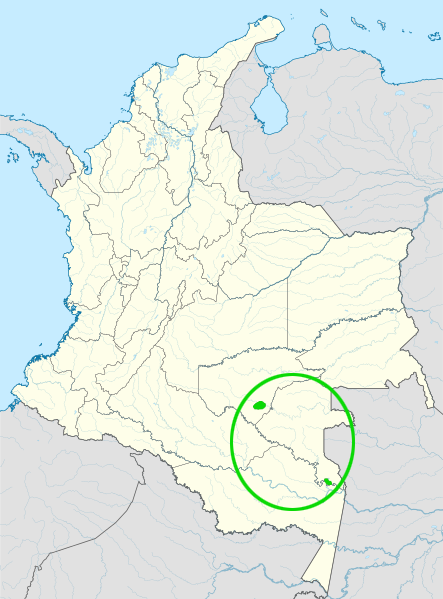

- Carijona is classified as Critically Endangered by the UNESCO Atlas of the World's Languages in Danger.

Carijona (Karihona) is a moribund Cariban language, or a pair of languages, of Colombia. It is spoken by only 15 people as of 2015. Derbyshire (1999) lists the varieties Hianacoto-Umaua and Carijona proper as separate languages.

== Phonology ==
=== Consonants ===
		Labial	Alveolar	Post- alveolar	Velar	Glottal
Stop	voiceless		t		k	
Stop	voiced	b	d		ɡ	
Affricate	voiceless			tʃ		
Affricate	voiced			dʒ		
Nasal		m	n	ɲ		
Fricative			s		w	h
Tap			ɾ			

=== Vowels ===
	Front	Central	Back
Close	i	ɨ	u
Mid	e	ə	o
Open		a	
