= List of rivers by discharge =

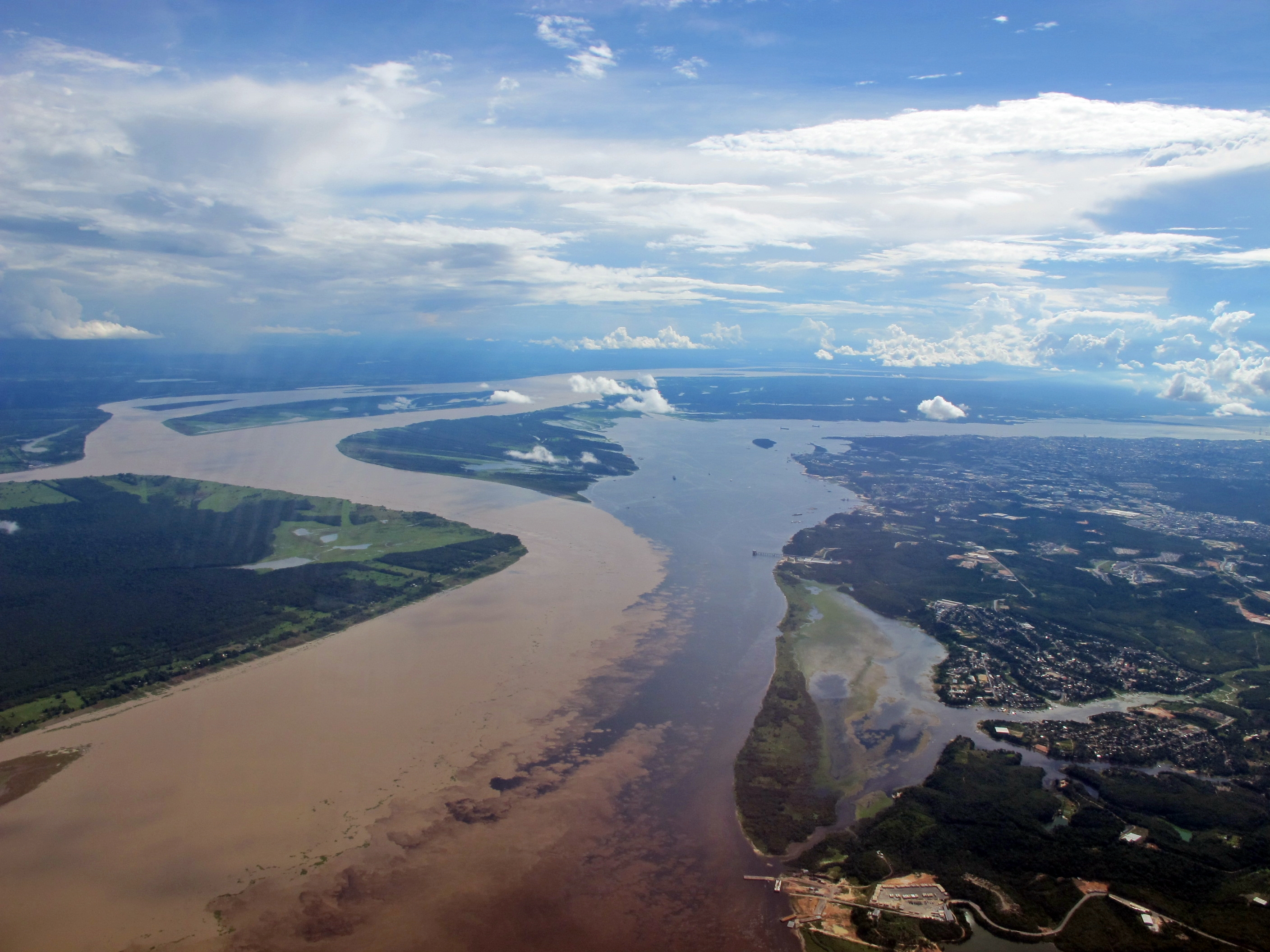
Meeting of Waters. Confluence of the Solimões (whitewater) and the Rio Negro (blackwater) near Manaus.

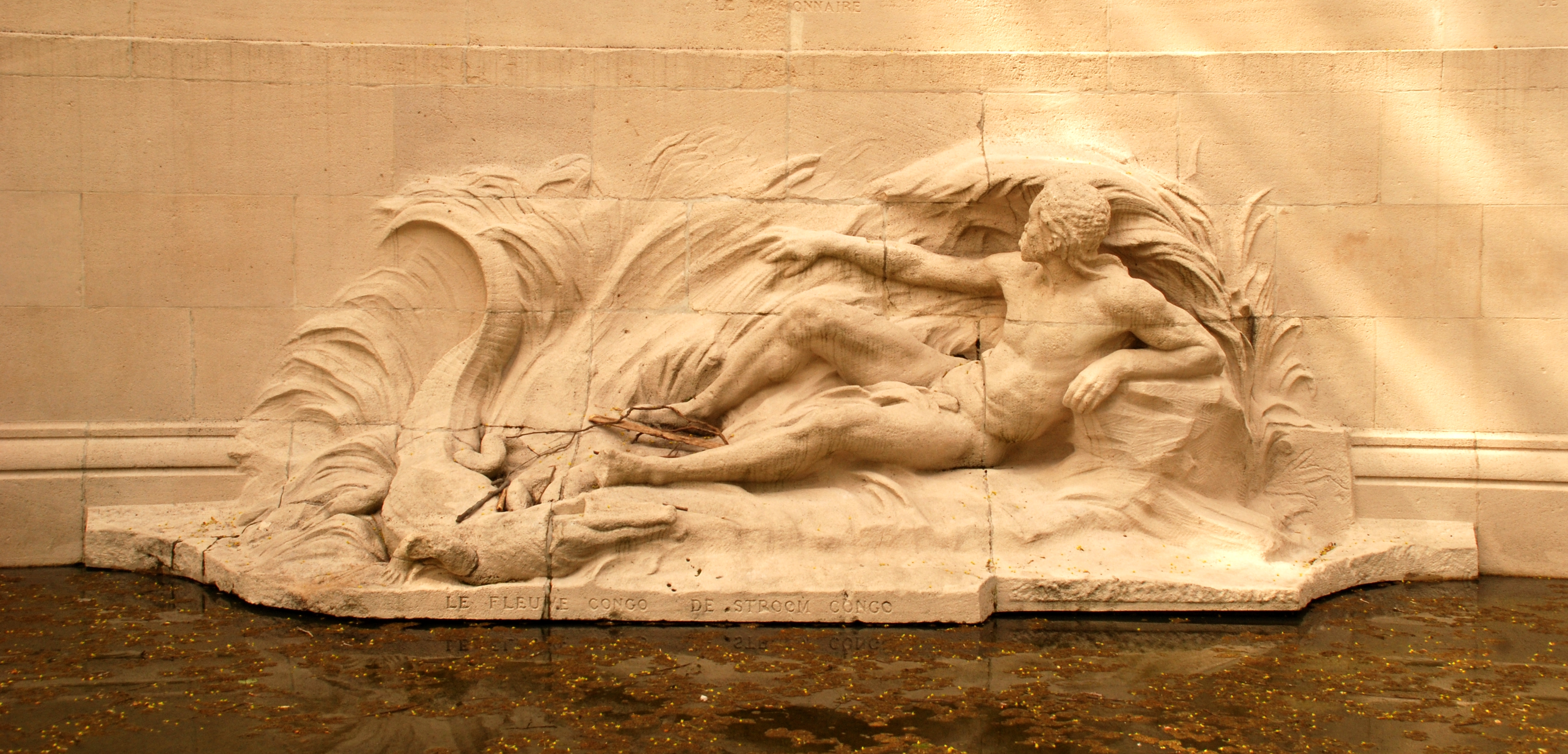
The Congo River allegory by Thomas Vinçotte.

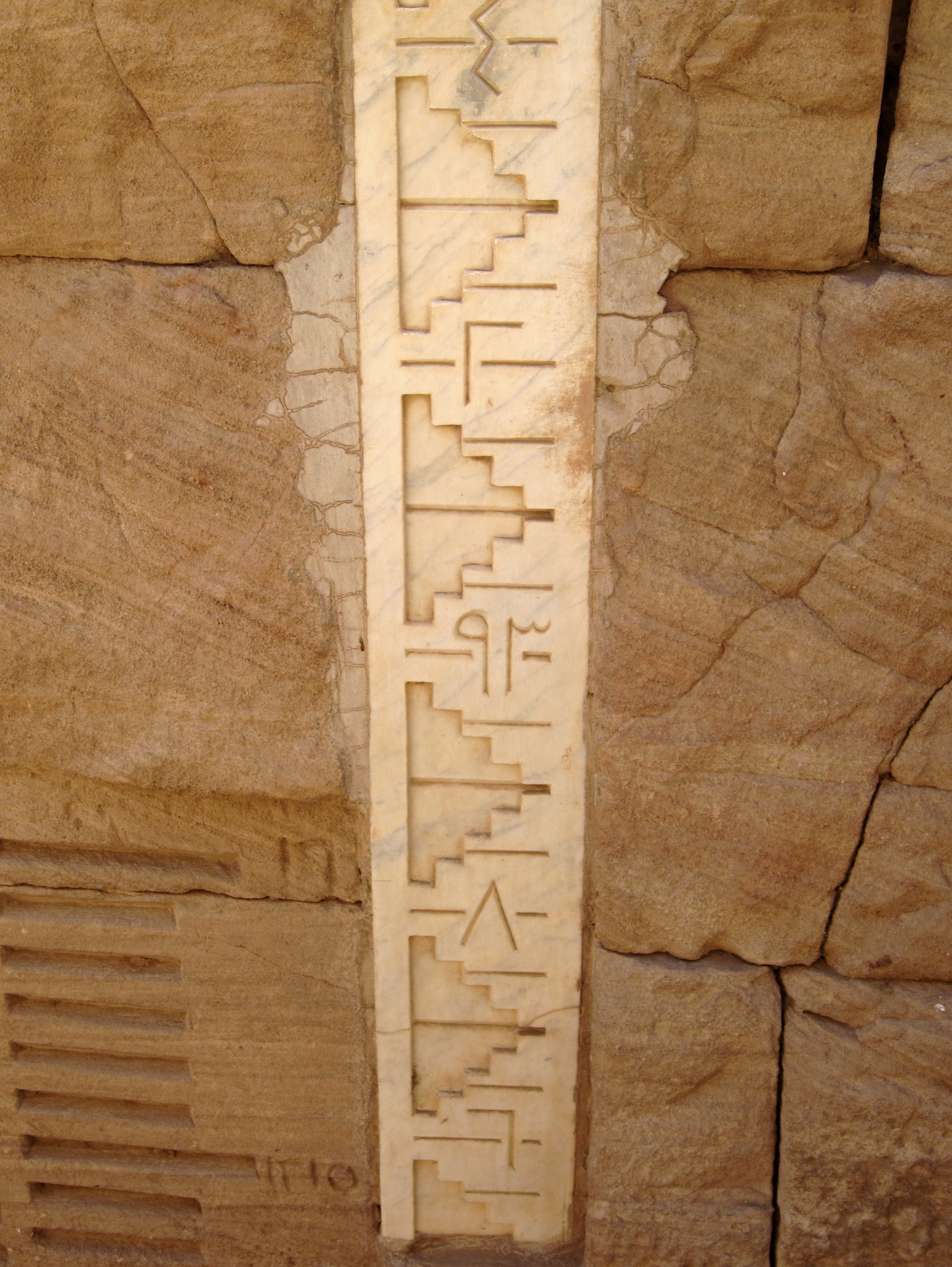
One of Egypt’s oldest nilometers, located on the island of Elephantine in the Nile.

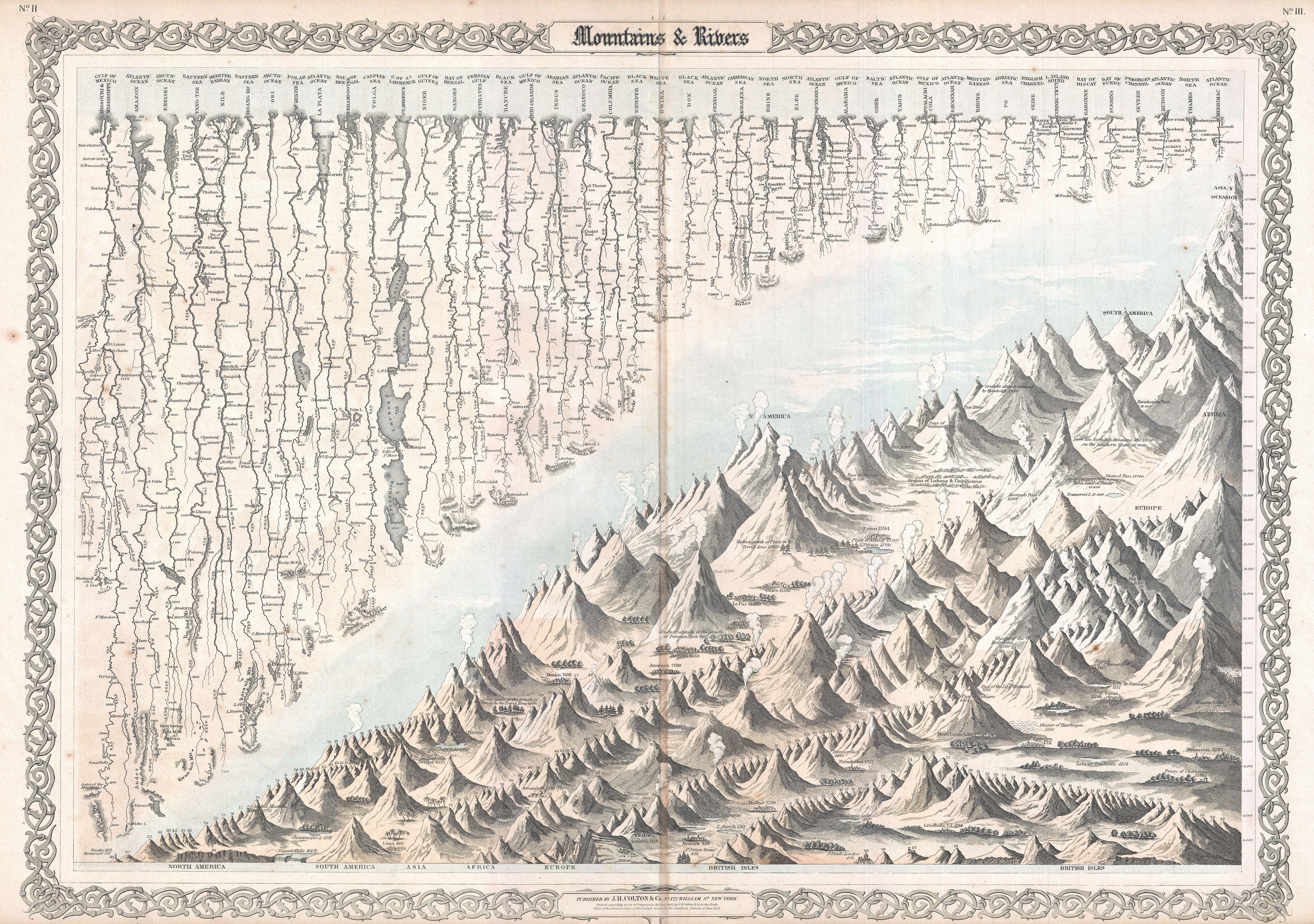
Chart of the World's Mountains and Rivers by J. H. Colton, 1855

Rivers are natural drainage channels. They collect runoff from precipitation and groundwater and discharge it into oceans or lakes. The main watercourse is determined by its water volume, length, or highest source. River size is determined by three factors: discharge, length, and drainage basin.

== Discharge measurements ==
The global annual runoff into the oceans (38,500–44,200 km^{3}/year) is dominated by runoff into the South Atlantic from eastern South America, into the western Pacific from east Asia, and into the Indian Ocean from India, and southeast Asia. Depending on the estimate, the Amazon alone accounts for 15–18% of the annual freshwater runoff into the oceans.

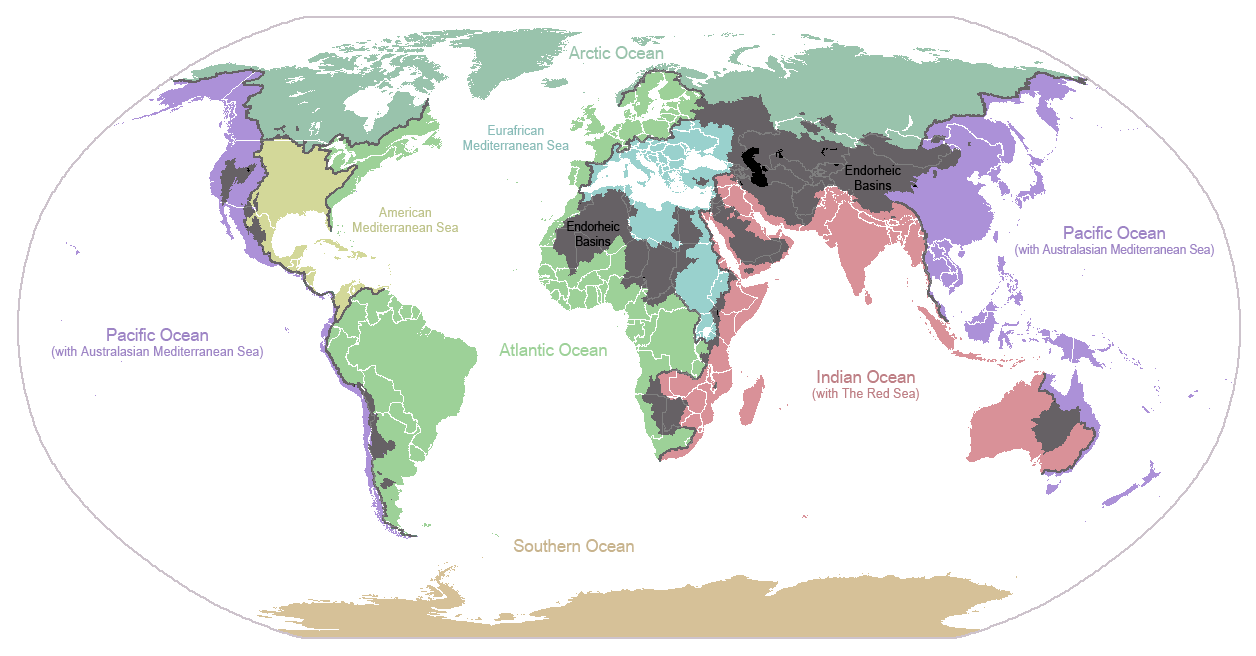
Major continental divides, showing drainage into the major oceans and seas of the world. Brownish-grey areas are endorheic basins that do not drain to the ocean.

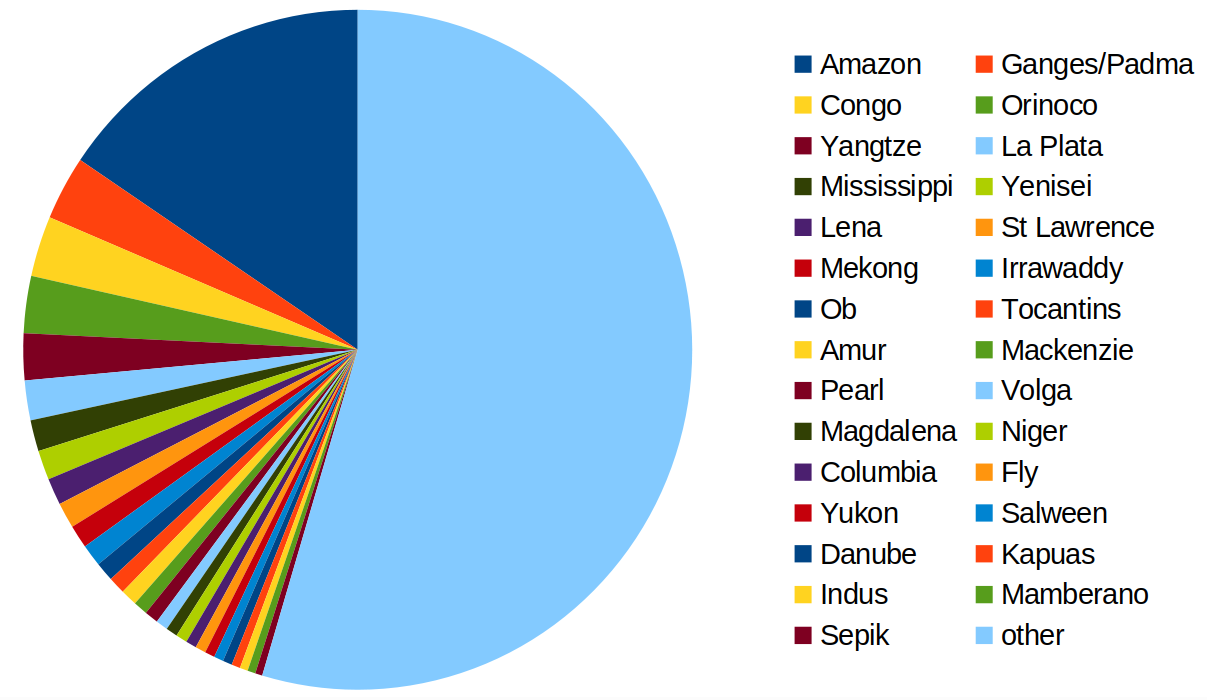
Circle represents total global river discharge of 38,500 km³/year

Water discharge may be expressed as mean annual discharge (denoted MQ), or as annual discharge (denoted Q). The units for measuring mean annual discharge (MQ) are m³/sec, and can be measured over a period of one or more years. The annual discharge (Q) is measured in units of km³/year. For large rivers, these values are difficult to measure (see ADCP), and they also vary considerably from year to year. The very large variation between low and high flow is often not apparent from the average runoff volume.

=== Rivers with high water discharge ===
In hydrological literature, rivers are categorized based on their mean annual discharge. A value of approximately 300 m³/s serves as an internationally accepted threshold between medium-sized and large rivers; according to the classification systems used in global river databases, the lower limit for the "large river" category begins in the 200–300 m³/s range. In river systems exceeding this threshold, hydraulic factors—such as depth, current velocity, and sediment transport capacity—create a habitat that is qualitatively different from those found in smaller watercourses. The GEMS-GLORI database lists 555 exorheic (ocean-draining) rivers that have a drainage basin area greater than 10,000 km² or an annual discharge exceeding 10 km³/year.

The discharge values shown in the tables below are mean annual discharge (units m^{3}/sec). To convert to annual discharge (units km^{3}/year) multiply by 0.031536.

== List of rivers ==
Continent color key
AF	AN	AS	AU, OC	EU	NA	SA
Africa (AF) • Antarctica (AN) • Asia (AS) • Australia (AU) and Oceania (OC) • Europe (EU) • North America (NA) • South America (SA)

Ocean color key
ARC	ATL	END	IND	PAC	SOU
Arctic Ocean (ARC) • Atlantic Ocean (ATL) • Endorheic (END) • Indian Ocean (IND) • Pacific Ocean (PAC) • Southern Ocean (SOU)

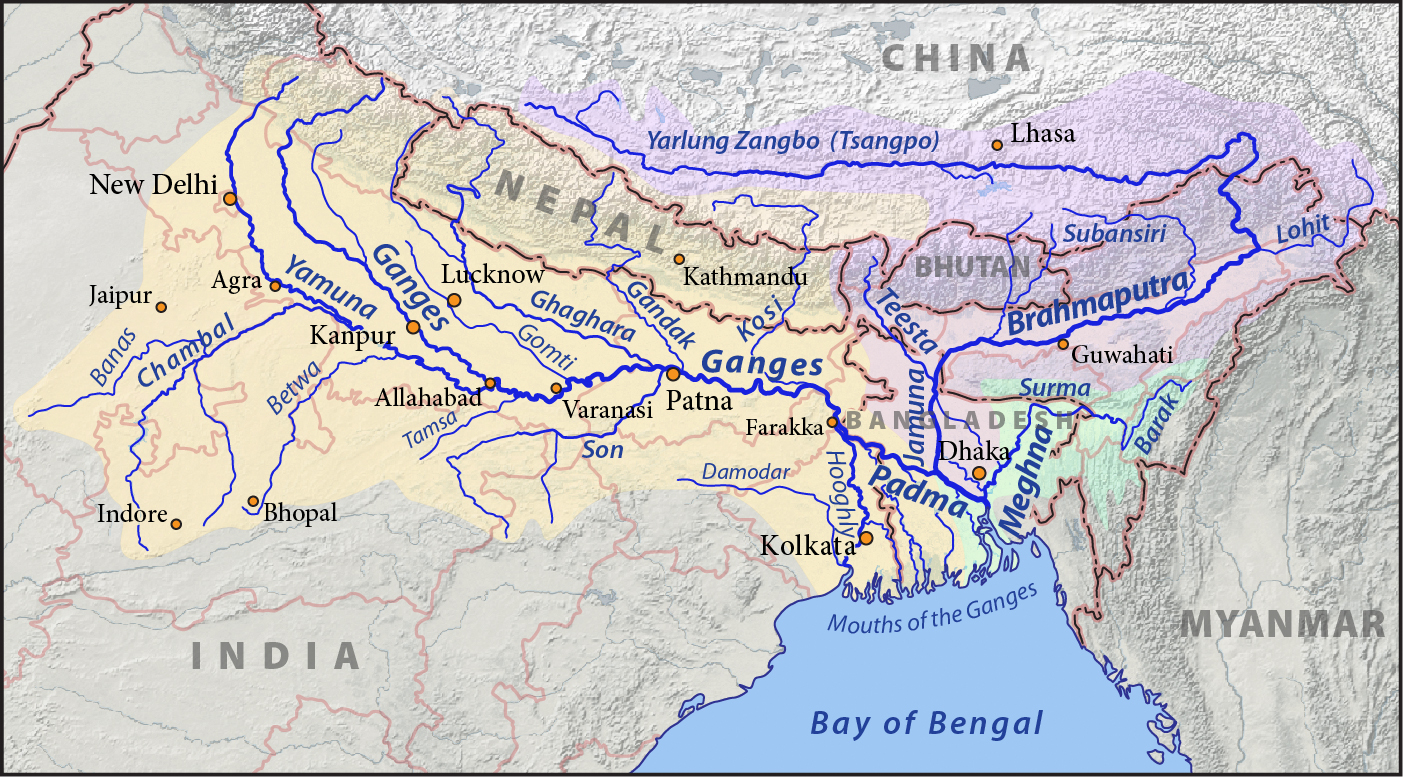
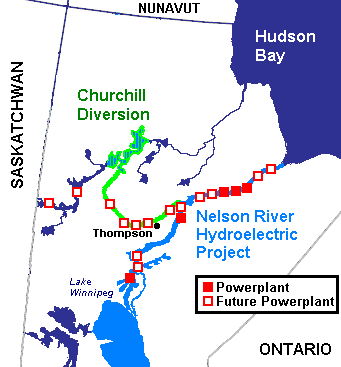
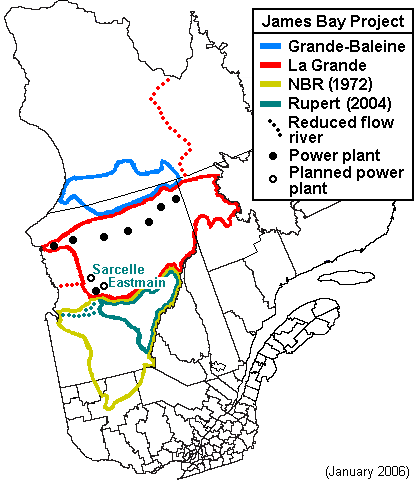
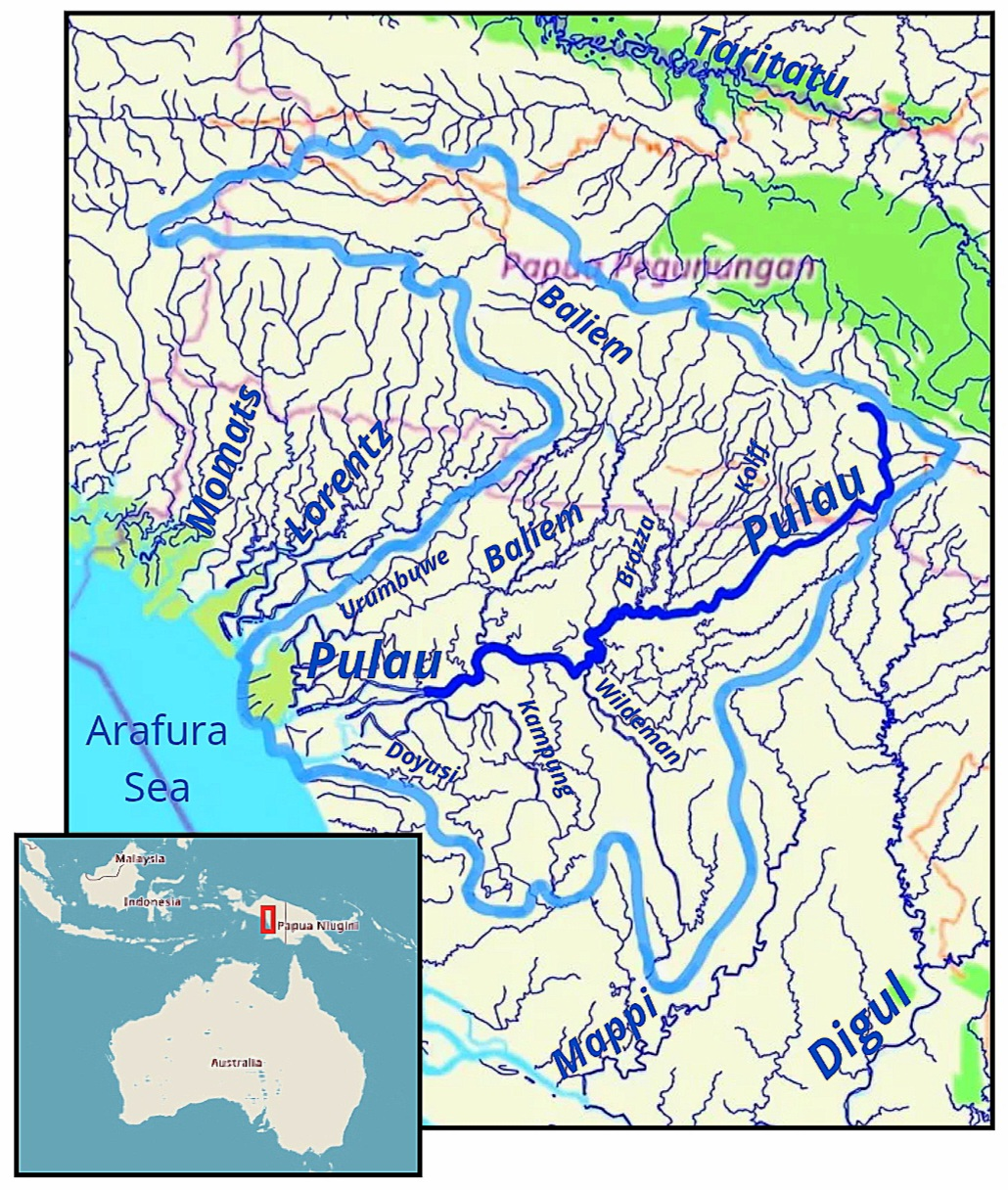
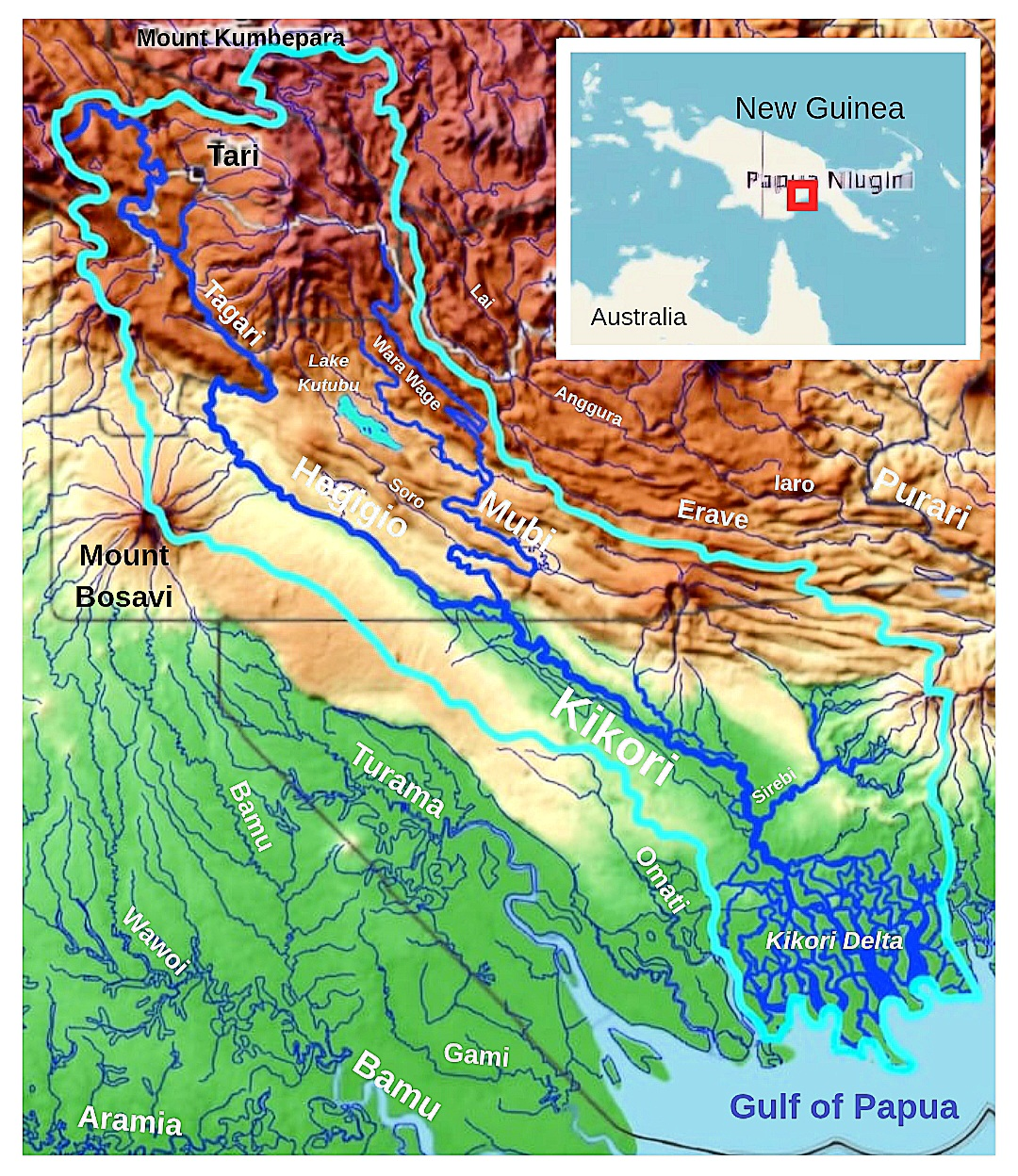
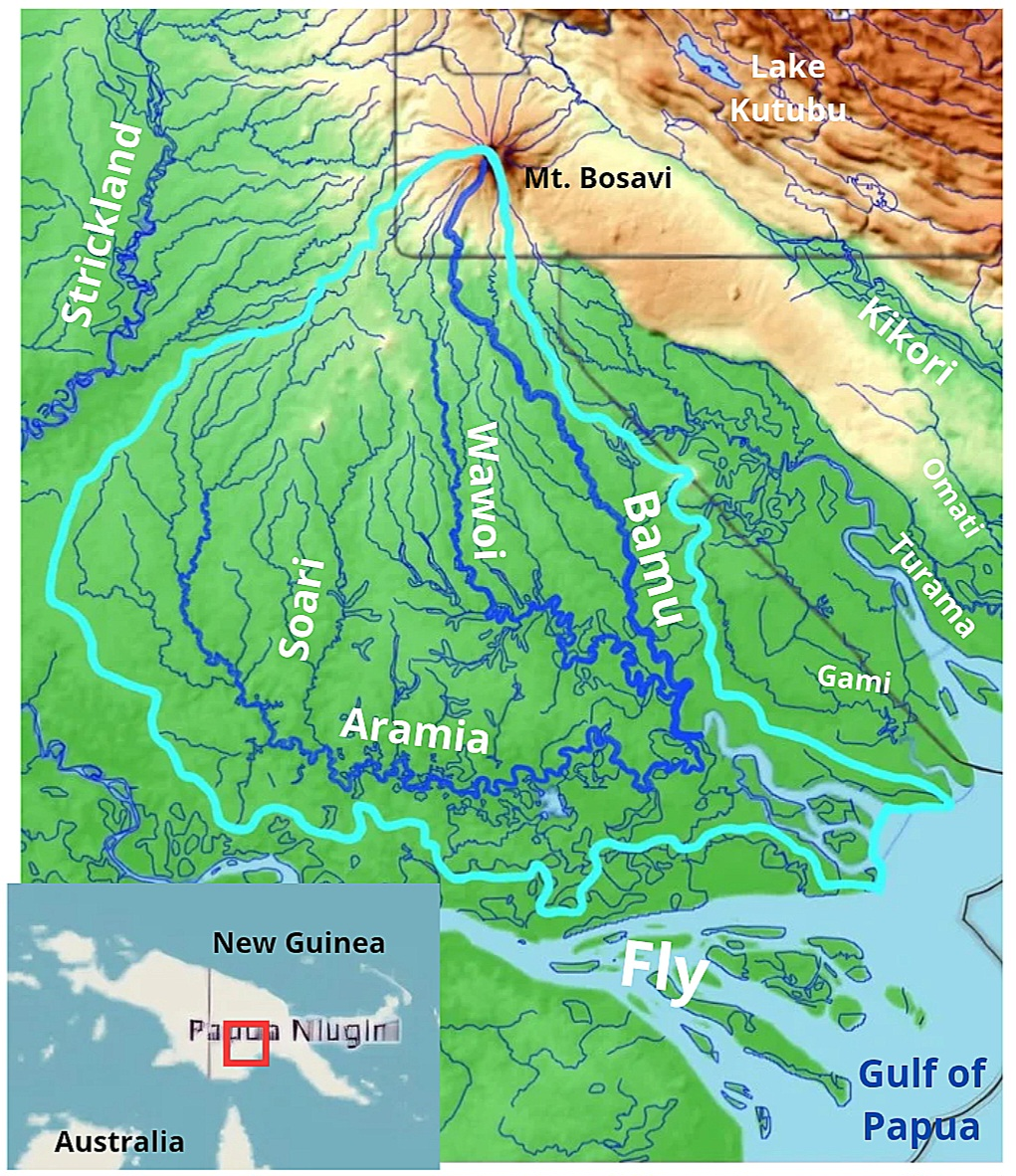
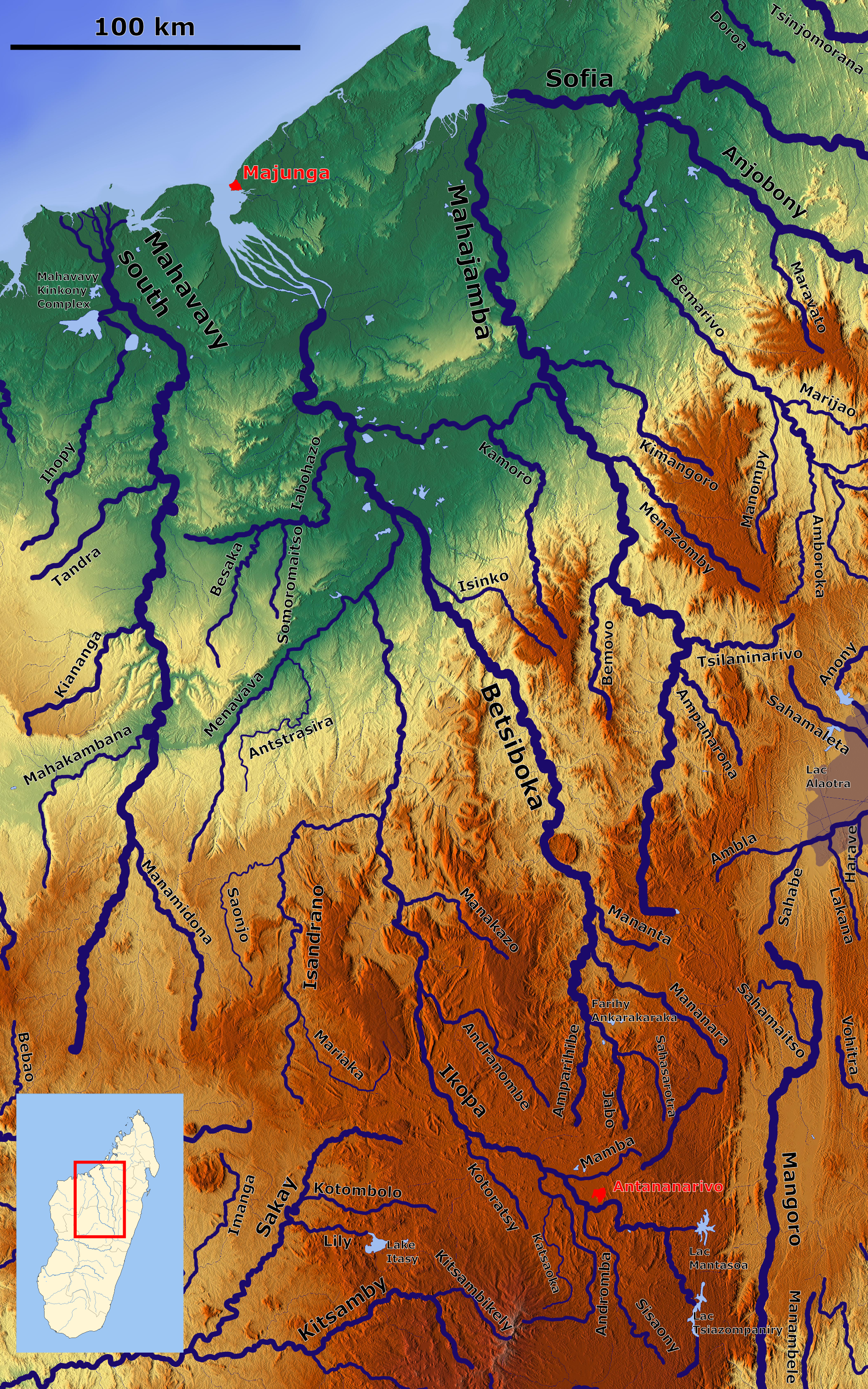
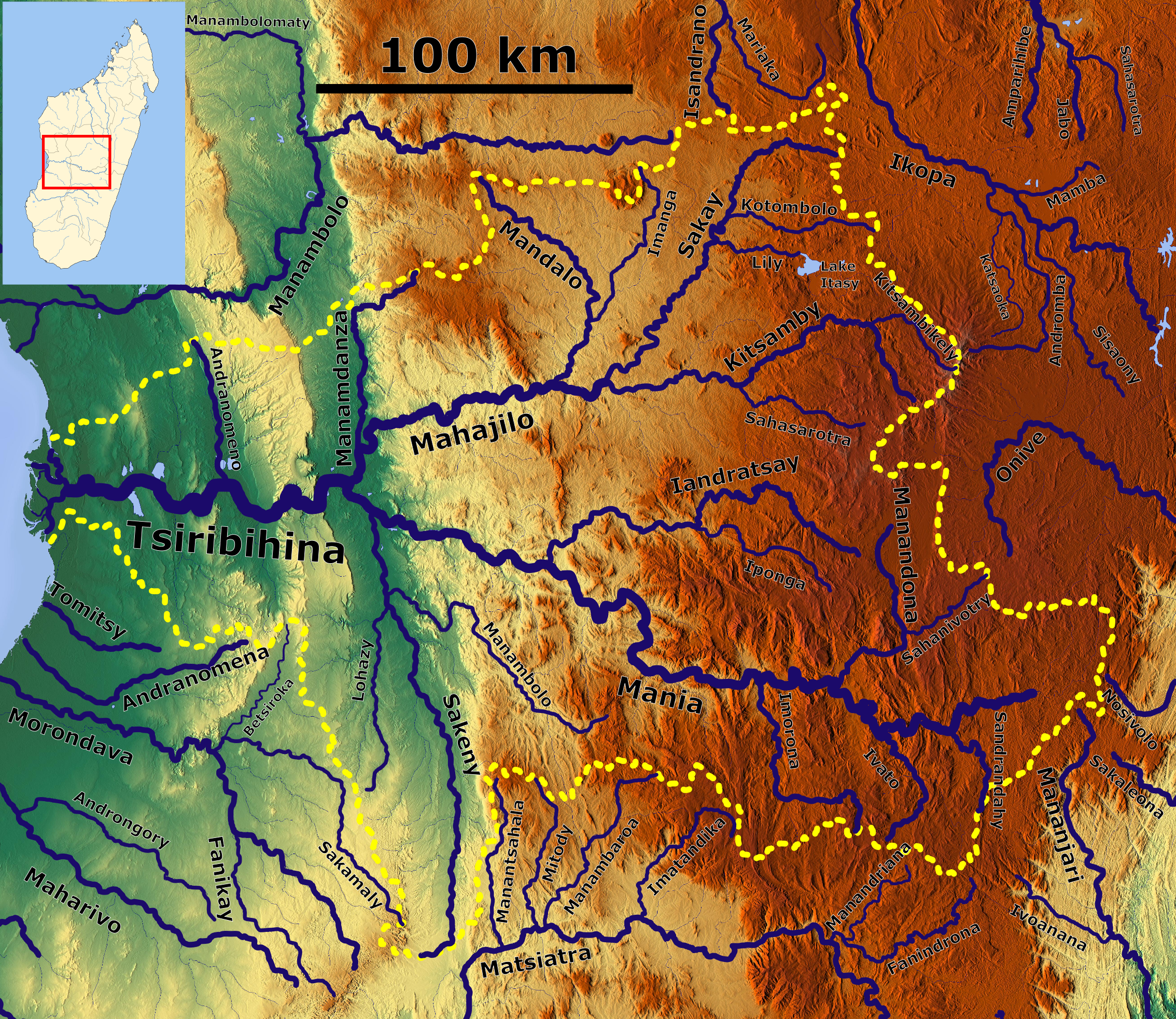
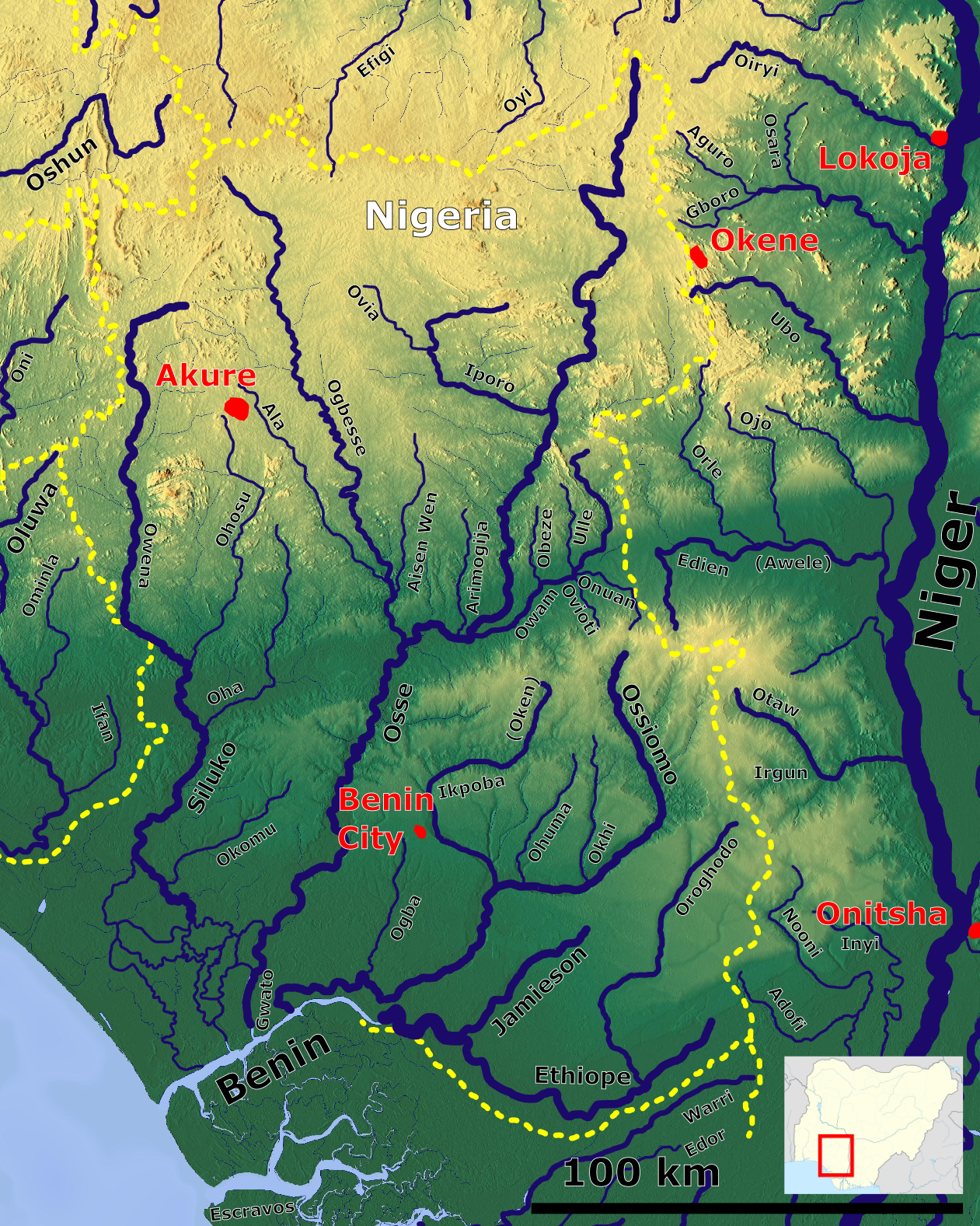
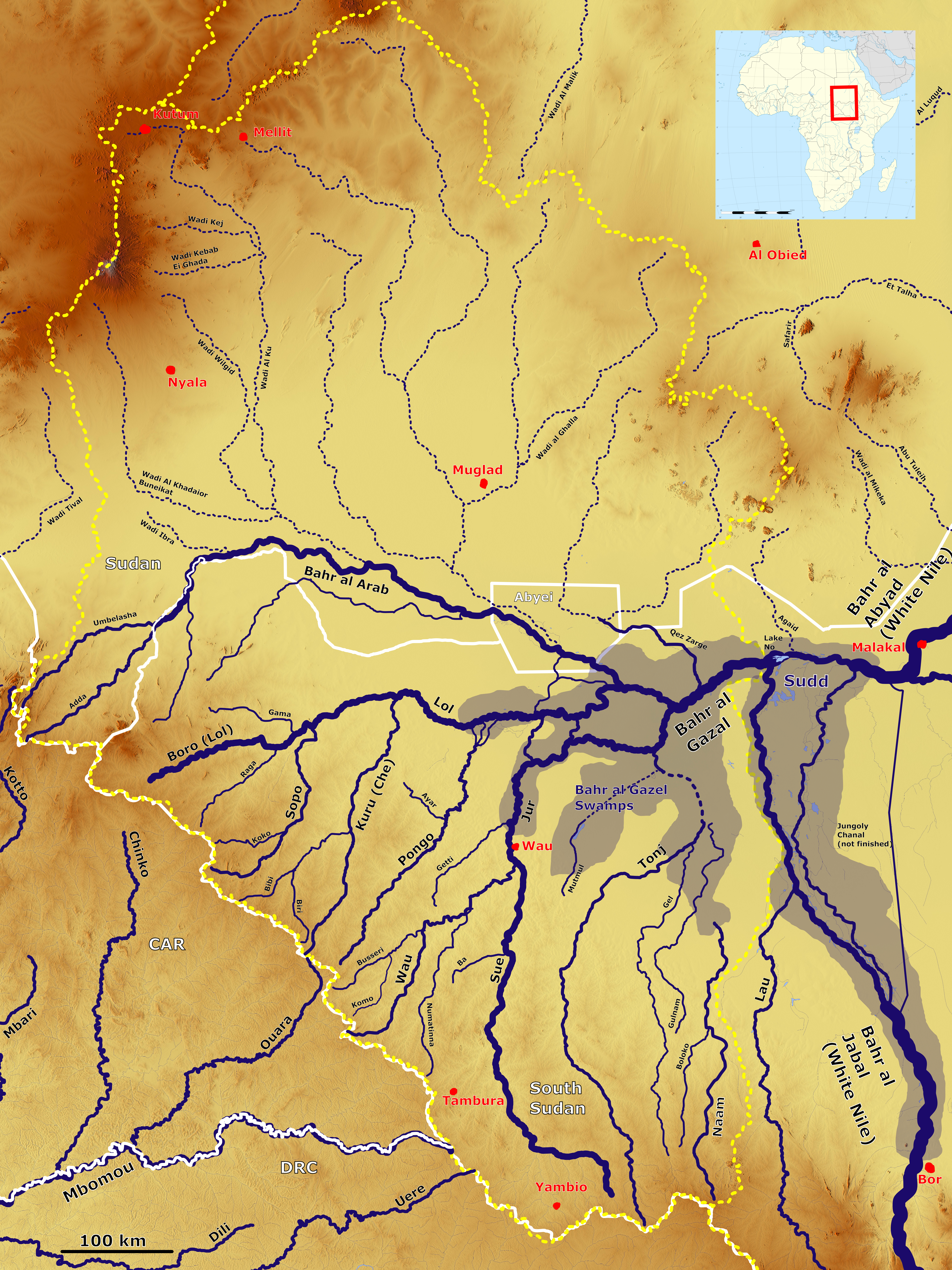
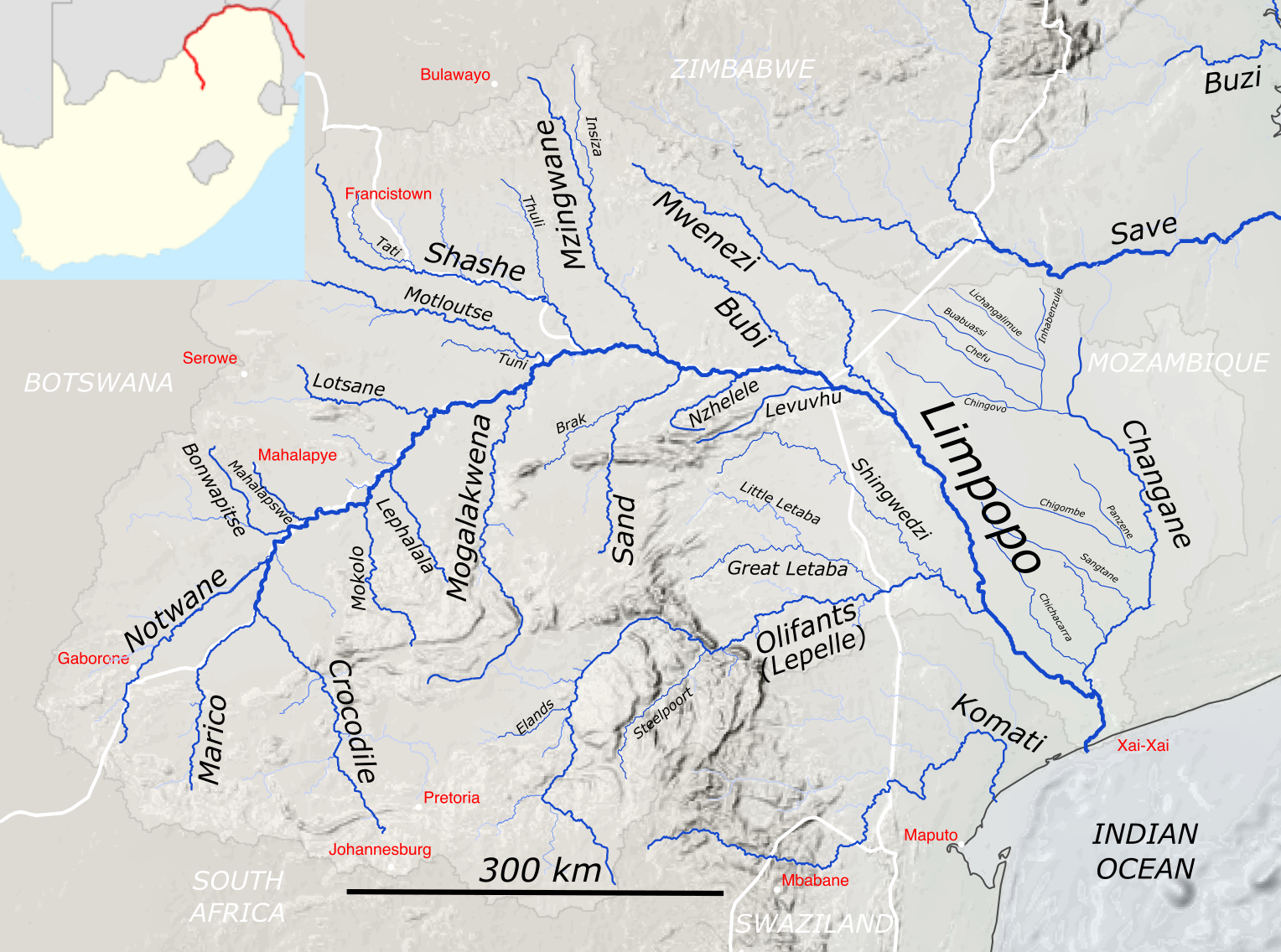
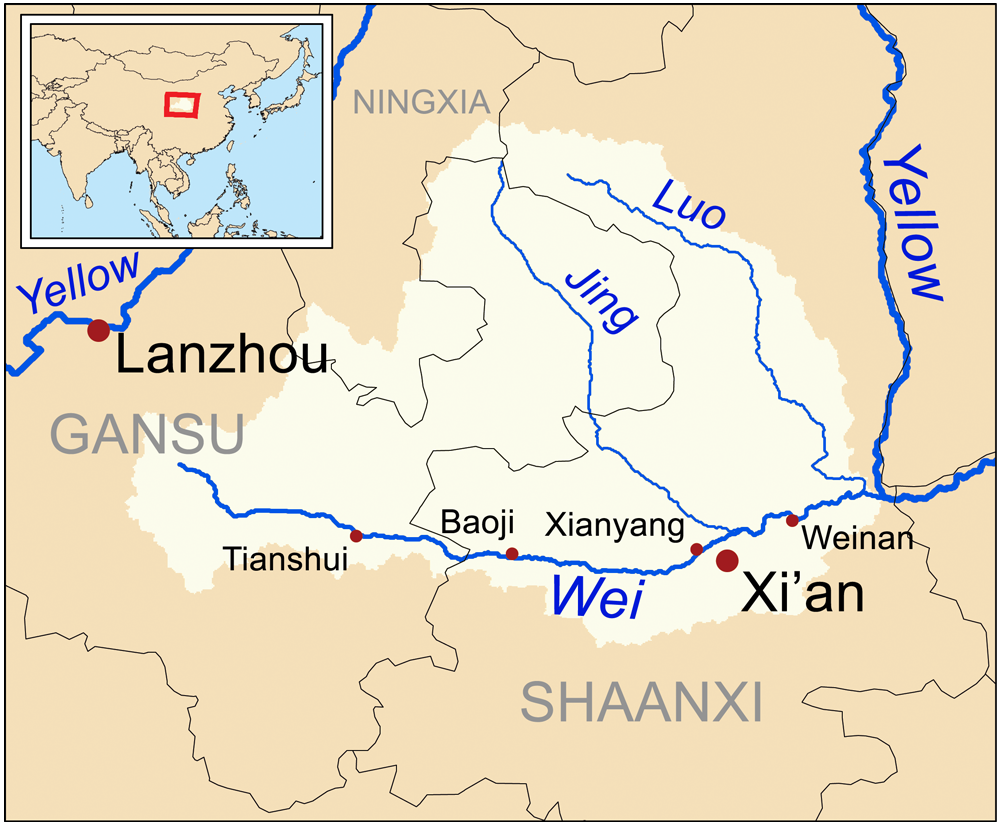
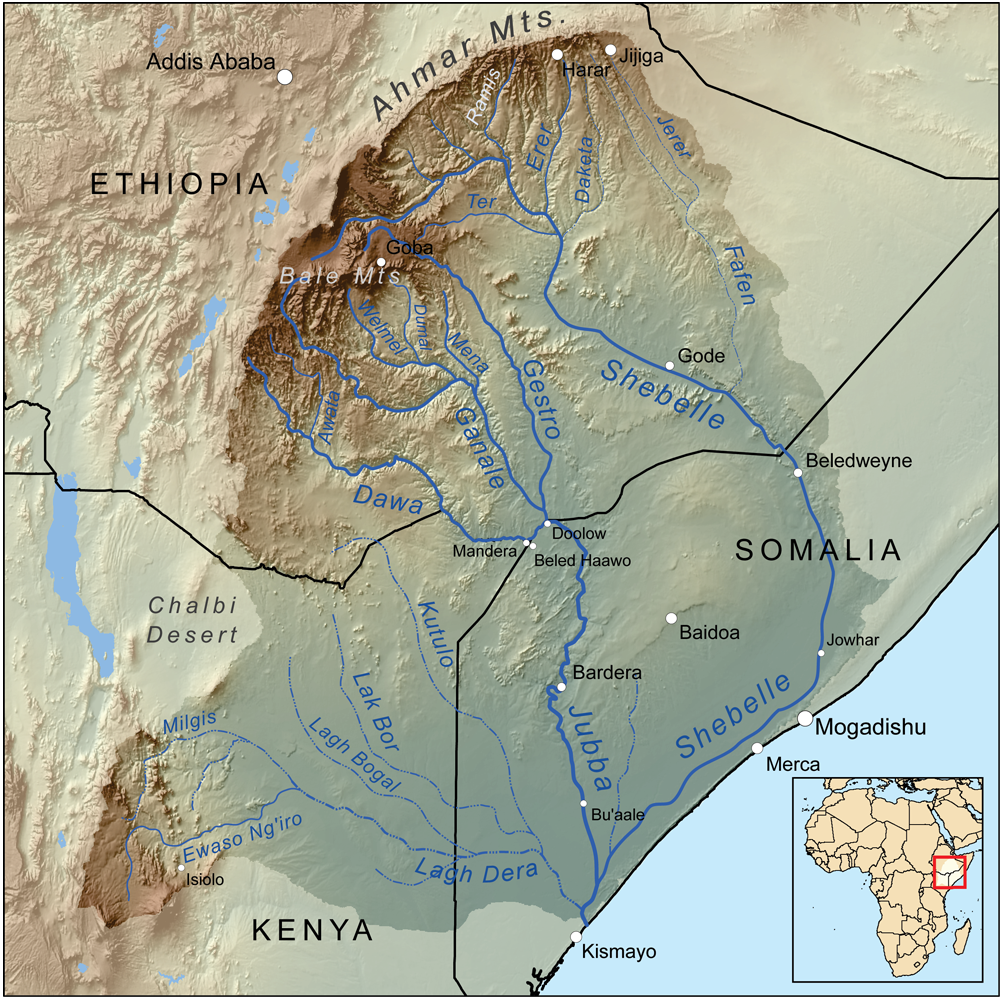
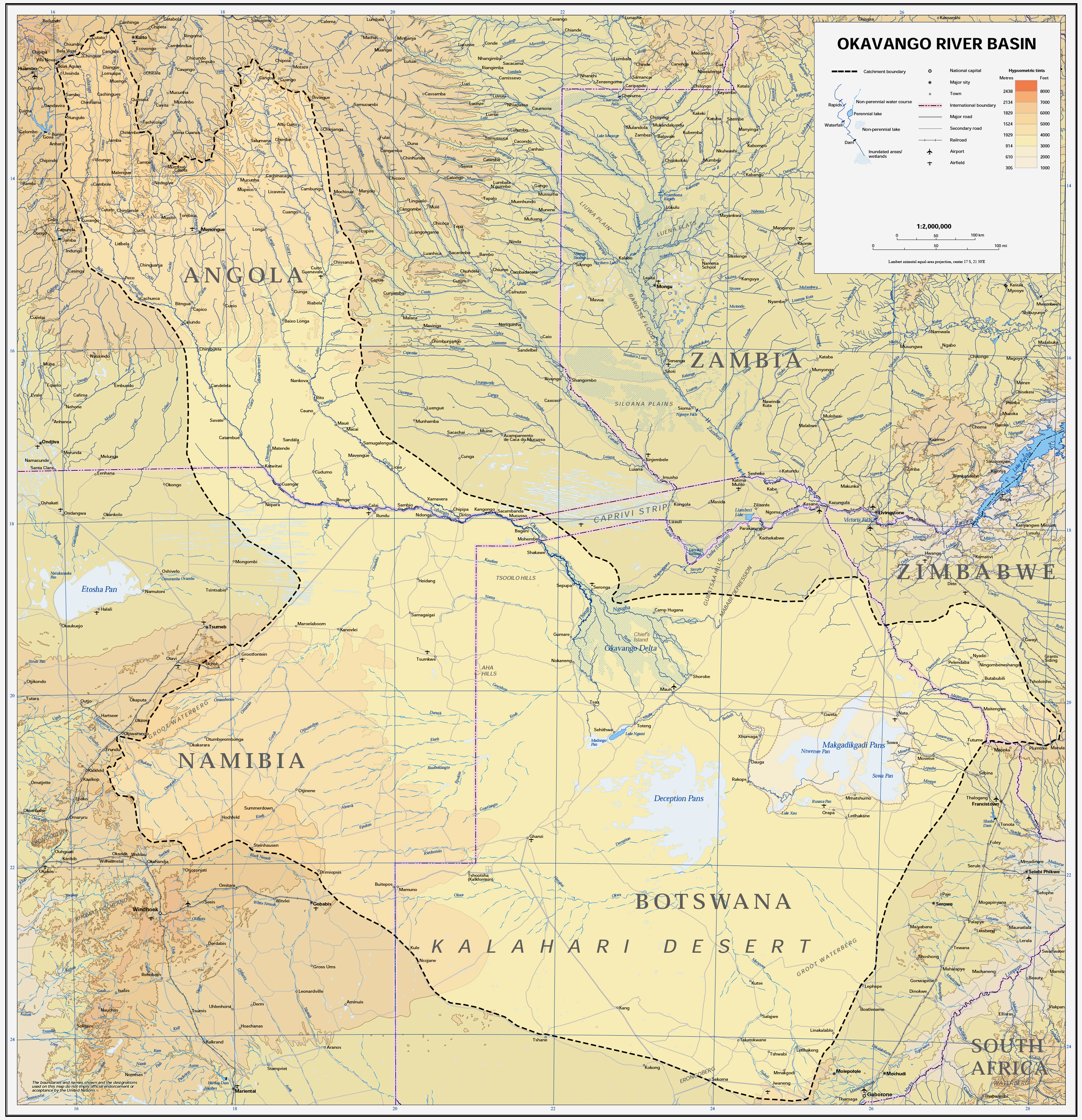
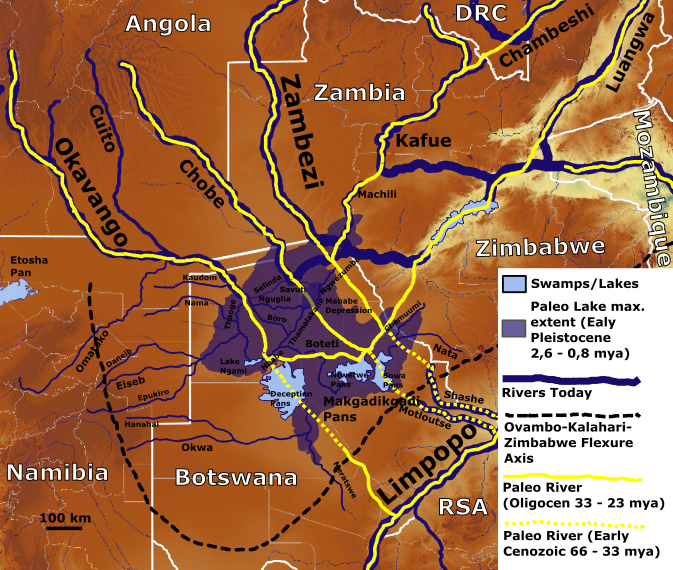
No	River name		Average discharge (m³/s)	Drainage area (km²)	Length (km)	Outflow	Notes, references
No	Primary	Tributary	Average discharge (m³/s)	Drainage area (km²)	Length (km)	Outflow	Notes, references
SA1	Amazon		209,000	6,020,438	6,575	Atlantic Ocean	(Note: The Amazon is the largest river in the world by discharge. Average discharge at near mouth 209,000 m³/s (period 1973 to 1990); Source or headwater: Amazon and Solimões (main stem 3,837 km)–Ucayali (main stem 1,668 km; drainage area 352,304 km²; average discharge at Requena 12,200 m³/s, and 12,600 m³/s at near mouth, 1981–2020)–Tambo (main stem 158 km; 131,726 km²; 2,892 m³/s)– Ené (main stem 181 km; 108,767 km²; 2,046 m³/s)–Apurímac (main stem 666 km; 64,734 km²; 1,050 m³/s)–Hornillos (65 km) → Total length 6,575 km (see→Source of the Amazon River); The Rio Pará is a tidally influenced estuary south of the Amazon River and Marajó Island. From the mouth of the Anapu River and the Furo do Tajapuru Channel (Amazon branch) to the Atlantic Ocean, it is about 350 km long. From the mouth of the Tocantins River, it is called the Marajó Bay. The Rio Pará estuary receives a significant amount of water from the north through the Amazon River. Some scientists advocate classifying it as part of the Amazon basin, since a significant amount of water (on average 6,000 m³/s) enters the system from the Amazon. If Amazon with Rio Pará considered as a water system, the catchment area is 6,925,674 km² (according to ANA), the total discharge averages at Amazon Delta 223,700 m³/s (or 220,800 m³/s for the period 1973–1990, according to HyBAM).)
AF2	Congo		41,400	3,712,316	5,118	Atlantic Ocean	(Note: Average discharge at Banana (near mouth) 1,308 km³/year, at Kinshasa and Brazzaville 40,500 m³/s (1902–2021). The Congo is the second or third largest river in the world by discharge. Source or headwaters: Congo (main stem 2,300 km)–Lualaba (above Boyoma Falls at Kisangani–Luvua River mouth main stem 978 km – total length 2,074 km, drainage area 969,518 km², average discharge 7,640 m³/s)–Luvua (main stem 388 km, 263,090 km², 644 m³/s)–Lake Mweru (Luapula inflow–Luvua outflow 116 km)–Luapula (main stem 555 km – total length 918 km, 173,709 km², 754 m³/s)–Lake Bangweulu and Bangweulu Wetlands (Chambeshi inflow–Luapula outflow 110 km)–Chambeshi (671 km, 60,425 km², 447 m³/s) → Total length 5,118 km;)
SA3	Orinoco		39,000	1,014,797	3,010	Atlantic Ocean	(Note: Average discharge at Orinoco Delta, 1983–2020; The Orinoco is the third or fourth largest river in the world by discharge; Source or headwater: Orinoco (lower and middle Orinoco main stem 1,250 km – The total length from the traditional – geographical – source to the mouth is 2,140 km;)–Guaviare (main stem 1,220 km, drainage area 151,607 km², average discharge 7,529 m³/s – period 1926 to 2011)–Guayabero (540 km, 24,346 km²; 986 m³/s) → Total length 3,010 km;)
AS4	Yangtze		31,900	1,949,515	6,236	East China Sea	(Note: Average discharge at Yangtze Delta 995.8 km³/year, period 1955–2021; Source or headwater: Yangtze (main stem 2,767 km)–Jinsha (main stem 2,290 km; drainage area 471,454 km²; average discharge 5,069 m³/s)–Tongtian (main stem 813 km; 139,955 km²; 427 m³/s)–Dangqu (366 km; 31,254 km²; 196 m³/s) → Total length 6,236 km;)
SA5		Rio Negro	30,641	765,335	2,362	Amazon	(Note: Average discharge at Manaus 30,641 m³/s, 1979–2015 (28,400 m³/s, 1973–1990); Source or headwaters: Rio Negro (main stem 1,700 km)–Guainía (length 662 km, drainage area 31,284 km², average discharge 2,433 m³/s) → Total length 2,362 km;)
SA6		Madeira	30,173	1,322,782	3,518	Amazon	(Note: Average discharge 30,173 m³/s, 1979–2015 (31,200 m³/s, 1973–1990); Source or headwater: Madeira (main stem 1,450 km)–Mamoré (main stem 1,042 km – total length 1,298 km, drainage area 633,613 km²; average discharge 7,743 m³/s)–Río Grande o Guapay (820 km; 106,396 km²; 727 m³/s)–Caine (119 km)–Rocha (69 km)–Mailanco (18 km) → Total length 3,518 km; The Madeira is thus one of the three longest tributaries in the world, along with the Irtysh and the Missouri. The confluence of the Madeira River estuary with the Amazon is a complex process. The Amazon River acts as a dam, carrying four times as much water despite its almost flat fall. Furthermore, the Madeira River has a significant sediment load (450×10⁶ ton/year). This is the same as the Amazon River, despite its lower volumetric flow, and is deposited where the current slows down. The Madeira River estuary is therefore a type of delta that extends for more than 300 km along the southern coast of the Amazon. A western branch, the Parana Madeirinha, branches off the main riverbed 200 km upstream of the estuary. This branch is fed by a major tributary, the Igapó-Açu. It flows into the Amazon River 12 km upstream of the main riverbed of the Madeira River. A 450 km long eastern branch, the Paraná do Urariá (also known as the Paraná do Ramos), branches off from the main river 100 km from the mouth and flows eastward parallel to the Amazon River. This branch isolates the large Tupinambarana island (area 11,850 km²), which is actually made up of four swampy islands surrounded by the river to the south and by branches of the Amazon to the north. It is fed by several tributaries: the Canumã, the Abacaxis, the Maués Açu and the Mamuru Rivers. The Paraná do Urariá (or Paraná do Ramos) joins the Amazon near the city of Parintins, 310 km downstream from the mouth of the main river Madeira. If these two branches and the tributaries that flow into them are added to the Madeira River, the total drainage area 1,496,852 km², and the average discharge exceeds 35,000 m³/s. This makes the Madeira the most abundant of the tributaries, surpassing major rivers such as the Yangtze (and only slightly behind the discharge of the Orinoco River), and the fifth largest river in the world in terms of discharge.)
AS7	Brahmaputra		27,000	641,964	3,848	Padma, Lower Meghna, Bay of Bengal	(Note: Entire Brahmaputra with Old Brahmaputra and Upper Meghna Basin; Average discharge 850 km³/year (Brahmaputra with Old Brahmaputra 700 km³/year, Upper Meghna 150 km³/year – period from 1990 to 2020); Source or headwater: Lower Meghna (main stem 130 km)–Padma (main stem 120 km)–Jamuna (main stem 337 km)–Brahmaputra (main stem 738 km)–Siang or Dihang (main stem 294 km; drainage area 256,374 km²; average discharge 5,037 m³/s)–Yarlung Tsangpo (main stem 2,229 km; 241,691 km²; 2,899 m³/s) → Total length 3,848 km;) (Note: The Ganges–Brahmaputra–Meghna is the second largest river in the world by discharge. Between 1990 and 2020, about 1,350 km³/year (period from 1921 to 1985: 43,704 m³/s) of freshwater flowed into the Bay of Bengal through the Ganges Delta. This includes the amount of water diverted from the Ganges at Farakka Barrage and flowing out through the mouth of the Hooghly. This combined river (total drainage area 1,731,334 km²) system delivers the largest amount of sediment in the world to the Bay of Bengal. Sediment load to some estimates, 1,840–2,177 million tons per year. Ganges–Brahmaputra–Meghna Basin)
NA8	Mississippi		21,300	3,265,753	6,084	Gulf of Mexico	(Note: Mississippi with Atchafalaya; Average discharge at Mississippi Delta 673 km³/year (Mississippi 474, Atchafalaya 199 km³/year), 1981–2021; Source or headwater: Mississippi (lower and middle Mississippi main stem 1,954 km)–Missouri (main stem 3,726 km, drainage area 1,376,180 km², average discharge 2,778 m³/s)–Jefferson (134 km, 24,915 km², 69 m³/s)–Beaverhead (111 km, 12,318 km², 41 m³/s)–Red Rock (113 km, 4,092 km², 16 m³/s)–Hell Roaring Creek (46 km, 441 km², 4 m³/s) → Total length 6,084 km;)
AS9	Yenisei		20,200	2,588,752	5,816	Yenisei Gulf	(Note: Average discharge at near mouth 637 km³/year (1984–2018); Source or headwater: Yenisei (lower and middle main stem 2,249 km)–Angara (main stem 1,849 km; drainage area 1,069,040 km²; average discharge 4,530 to 5,250 m³/s)–Lake Baikal (Selenga inflow–Angara outflow 238 km)–Selenga (main stem 1,024 km; 447,060 km²; 964 m³/s)–Ider (456 km; 24,555 km²; 65 m³/s) → Total length 5,816 km;)
SA10	Paraná		19,706	2,630,667	4,352	Río de la Plata	(Note: The average discharge of the Paraná River at the Paraná Delta (19,706 m³/s), covers a 40-year period (1971–2010); Drainage area 2,630,667 km²; Source or headwater: Paraná (main stem 2,897 km)–Rio Grande (length 1,455 km; drainage area 143,656 km²; average discharge 2,435 m³/s) → Total length 4,352 km; The common estuary of the Paraná and Uruguay rivers is the La Plata. The La Plata is about 327 km total length (inner fluvial zone 225 km). Its drainage basin is 3,182,064 km² (basin size with endorheic area 4,144,000 km²). It is estimated that about 27,225 m³/s of freshwater flows into the Atlantic Ocean through the estuary (1971–2010). Some consider the La Plata to be a river, others a bay.)
AS11	Lena		18,300	2,492,004	4,692	Laptev Sea	(Note: Average discharge at Lena Delta 581 km³/year, period from 1984 to 2018; Source or headwaters: Lena (lower and middle Lena main stem 2,714 km)–Vitim (main stem 1,837 km, drainage area 234,219 km², average discharge 2,379 m³/s)–Vitimkan (141 km) → Total length 4,692 km;)
SA12		Japurá	18,122	276,812	2,820	Solimões
SA13		Marañón	17,400	364,873	1,905	Amazon	(Note: Average discharge at San Regis, 1981–2020 (16,400 m³/s, 1973–1990); Hydrologic source of Amazon River (see→Source of the Amazon River);)
AS14	Mekong		16,010	773,728	4,909	South China Sea
AS15	Ganges		15,800	1,089,370	2,704	Padma, Bay of Bengal	(Note: Average discharge 500 km³/year (period from 1990 to 2020); Source or headwater: Lower Meghna (main stem 130 km)–Padma (main stem 120 km)–Padma Ganges (main stem 236 km)–Ganges or Ganga (main stem 2,013 km)–Bhagirathi (length 205 km, drainage area 6,921 km², average discharge 258 m³/s) → Total length 2,704 km;)
AS16	Irrawaddy		15,400	411,516	2,288	Andaman Sea	(Note: Average discharge at Irrawaddy Delta 486 km³/year; Source or headwater: Irrawaddy (main stem 1,879 km)–N'Mai (main stem 352 km, 24,337 km², 1,383 m³/s)–Khakabo Razi (57 km) → Total length 2,288 km;)
AS17	Ob		13,100	3,023,973	5,525	Gulf of Ob	(Note: Average discharge at near mouth 414 km³/year (1984–2018); Source or headwater: Ob (lower Ob main stem 1,277 km)–Irtysh (main stem 3,576 km; drainage area 1,691,000 km²; average discharge 2,995 m³/s, period 1971–2000)–Black Irtysh (or Kara Irtysh; 672 km; 53,000 km², 354 m³/s) → Total length 5,525 km;)
SA18		Tapajós	12,800	492,263	2,291	Amazon	(Note: Average discharge at Santarém 12,800 m³/s, 1985–2018 (13,540 m³/s, 1973–1990); Source or headwater: Tapajós (main stem 810 km)–Teles Pires (or São Manoel – length 1,481 km, drainage area 141,987 km², 3,961 m³/s) → Total length 2,291 km;)
NA19	St Lawrence River		12,500	1,057,304	3,058	Gulf of St. Lawrence	(Note: St. Lawrence River at Quebec City: average discharge (1968–2023) 12,500 m³/s, drainage basin 1,057,304 km², length 3,058 km (source to L' Islet); St. Lawrence River at Pointe-des-Monts Lighthouse: length 3,380 km, drainage basin 1,266,642 km², average discharge 17,600 m³/s (1969–2023); Source or headwater: St. Lawrence River (main stem 646 km – main stem with estuary 968 km)–Lake Ontario (Niagara inflow–St. Lawrence River outflow 311 km)–Niagara (length 58 km; drainage area 684,000 km²; average discharge 5,885 m³/s)–Lake Erie (Detroit inflow–Niagara outflow 385 km)–Detroit (45 km; 595,052 km²; 5,324 m³/s)–Lake St. Clair (St. Clair River inflow–Detroit outflow 53 km)–St. Clair River (65 km; 583,509 km²; 5,200 m³/s)–Lake Huron (St. Marys River inflow–St. Clair River outflow 440 km)–St. Marys River (120 km; 211,833 km²; 2,177 m³/s)–Lake Superior (St. Louis River inflow–St. Marys River outflow 616 km)–Saint Louis River (309 km; 9,410 km²; 147 m³/s)–North River (10 km) → Total length 3,058 km (with estuary 3,380 km);)
AS20	Amur		12,360	2,129,700	5,498	Strait of Tartary	(Note: Average discharge at near mouth 390 km³/year (2002–2020); Source or headwater: Amur (main stem 2,874 km)–Argun (main stem 965 km – Argun with Hailar total length 1,620 km, drainage area 300,977 km², average discharge 409 m³/s)–Dalan Orom (Xinkai) and Hulun Lake (Kherlen inflow–Dalan Orom outflow 94 km)–Kherlen (1,565 km, 238,600 km², 54 m³/s) → Total length 5,498 km;)
SA21	Tocantins		11,800	777,308	3,100	Rio Para	(Note: Average discharge 11,800 m³/s (1973–1990); Source or headwater: Tocantins (lower Tocantins main stem 473 km)–Araguaia (length 2,627 km, drainage area 386,073 km², average discharge 6,420 m³/s) → Total length 3,100 km; The Rio Pará is a tidally influenced estuary south of the Amazon River and Marajó Island. From the mouth of the Anapu River and the Furo do Tajapuru Channel (Amazonas branch) to the Atlantic Ocean, it is about 350 km long. From the mouth of the Tocantins River, it is called the Marajó Bay. The total length of the Rio Pará and Tocantins system is 2,850 km from the source of the Maranhão River, and 3,100 km from the source of the Araguaia River. Its total drainage area is approximately 1 million square kilometers. The Rio Para estuary receives a significant amount of water from the north through the Amazon River. It receives less water from the smaller northern tributaries originating on Marajó Island. The southern inflows are much more significant: the Anapu, the Pacajá, the Jacundá, the Tocantins–Araguaia system, the Guamá–Capim with its Acará–Moju tributaries. Of these, the Tocantins is considered a separate water system from the Amazon. Some scientists advocate classifying it as part of the Amazon basin, since a significant amount of water (on average 6,000 m³/s) enters the system from the Amazon. The annual average discharge of the Pará River (Rio Pará) before the mouth of the Tocantins River is approximately 10,000 m³/s. Of this, about 6,000 m³/s comes from the Amazon through the Breves Channel and the Furo do Tajapuru branch. The estuarine system of the Rio Pará and Tocantins is extremely complex. The discharge of the Tocantins fluctuates greatly seasonally. In drier periods, the Amazon River contributes to the discharge through the Breves Channel, so the average discharge of the entire estuary system can reach 21,000–26,000 m³/s at the Atlantic mouth;)
SA22		Purus	11,207	378,762	3,361	Solimões
AS23	Pearl River–Xi		10,700	442,527	2,400	South China Sea	(Note: Average discharge at Pearl River Delta 336 km³/year (1953–2017); Source or headwater: Pearl River (main stem length 177 km)–Xi (main stem 210 km; drainage area 338,899 km²; average discharge 7,420 m³/s)–Xun (172 km, 314,096 km², 6,645 m³/s)–Qian (121 km, 186,660 km², 3,901 m³/s)–Hongshui (670 km, 125,626 km², 2,381 m³/s)–Nanpan (950 km, 50,560 km², 685 m³/s) → Total length 2,400 km;)
AF24		Kasai	10,457	884,376	2,272	Congo
NA25	Mackenzie		9,910	1,801,938	4,241	Beaufort Sea	(Note: Average discharge at Mackenzie Delta 310 km³/year (1984–2018); Source or headwater: Mackenzie (main stem 1,749 km)–Great Slave Lake (Slave inflow–Mackenzie outflow 135 km)–Slave (main stem 434 km, drainage area 616,400 km², 3,451 m³/s)–Peace (1,521 km, 306,000 km², 2,225 m³/s)–Finlay (402 km, 43,271 km², 680 m³/s) → Total length 4,241 km;)
SA26		Beni	9,741	281,367	1,619	Madeira	(Note: Average discharge at near mouth (period from 1968 to 1982); Source or headwater: Beni (main stem 1,178 km)–Alto Beni (main stem 178 km, drainage area 31,240 km², average discharge 637 m³/s)–Cotacajes (main stem 125 km, 8,310 km², 121 m³/s)–Sacambaya (37 km)–Ayopaya (40 km)–Leque (37 km)–Tallija (24 km) → Total length 1,619 km;)
SA27		Xingu	9,298	509,685	2,275	Amazon	(Note: Average discharge at near mouth, 1972–2003 (9,680 m³/s, period 1973 to 1990); Source or headwater: Xingu (main stem 1,640 km)–Culuene (length 635 km, 29,560 km², average discharge 543 m³/s) → Total length 2,275 km;)
AF28	Niger		8,630	2,273,946	4,184	Gulf of Guinea
SA29		Putumayo	8,520	120,545	2,005	Solimões
EU30	Volga		8,380	1,466,717	3,700	Caspian Sea
NA31		Ohio	8,380	528,202	2,102	Mississippi	(Note: Average discharge at near mouth, 1951–1996; Source or headwater: Ohio (main stem 1,579 km)–Allegheny (length 523 km, drainage area 30,247 km², average discharge 580 m³/s) → Total length 2,102 km;)
SA32	Magdalena		8,058	271,807	1,558	Caribbean Sea	(Note: Average discharge at Calamar, 1991–2020;)
NA33	Columbia		7,478	724,025	2,250	Pacific Ocean	(Note: Average discharge at Astoria 236 km³/year (period from 1979 to 2015); Source or headwater: Columbia (lower and middle Columbia main stem 515 km – The total length from the traditional – geographical – source to the mouth is 1,954 km;)–Snake (length 1,735 km, drainage area 260,939 km², average discharge 1,756 m³/s) → Total length 2,250 km;)
AS34		Ob above Irtysh	7,428	1,009,340	3,178	Ob	(Note: Average discharge 7,428 m³/s (1971–2000); Drainage area 1,009,340 km²; Source or headwater: Middle and Upper Ob (main stem 2,490 km)–Katun (length 688 km, drainage area 60,900 km², average discharge 652 m³/s) → Total length 3,178 km; The total length from the source of the Katun River to the confluence with the Irtysh River is approximately 3,178 km (or up to 3,208 km depending on measuring methodologies). This is calculated by adding the 688 km length of the Katun River to the Upper and Middle sections of the Ob proper, which extend from the Katun–Biya confluence to the mouth of the Irtysh, totaling around 2,490 to 2,520 km.)
SA35	Uruguay		7,058	353,451	2,408	Río de la Plata	(Note: Average discharge at Nueva Palmira, 1971–2010; Source or headwater: Uruguay (main stem 1,838 km)–Canoas (length 570 km, drainage area 14,884 km², average discharge 309 m³/s) → Total length 2,408 km;)
NA36	Yukon		7,000	861,461	3,185	Norton Sound
SA37		Napo	6,800	103,308	1,130	Amazon	(Note: Average discharge at Bellavista, 1981–2020;)
AS38	Salween		6,691	283,500	3,562	Andaman Sea
AU39	Fly		6,500	73,809	1,280	Gulf of Papua	(Note: Average discharge at near mouth, 1990–2003; Source or headwater: Fly (lower Fly main stem 456 km)–Strickland (main stem 609 km, drainage area 36,740 km², average discharge 3,328 m³/s)–Lagaip (215 km) → Total length 1,280 km;)
EU40	Danube		6,452	801,463	2,857	Black Sea
SA41		Madre de Dios	6,372	125,287	1,347	Beni
AS42	Kapuas		6,012	94,457	1,143	South China Sea
SA43		Juruá	6,004	190,573	3,283	Solimões
AF44		Ubangi	5,936	651,915	2,350	Congo	(Note: Average discharge, 1911–1995; Source or headwater: Ubangi (main stem 1,046 km)–Uele (main stem 864 km, drainage area 140,155 km², average discharge 1,468 m³/s)–Kibali (440 km, 22,380 km², 175 m³/s) → Total length 2,350 km;)
SA45		Meta	5,694	106,733	1,100	Orinoco
AS46	Indus		5,589	1,143,101	3,600	Arabian Sea
AS47		Aldan	5,501	717,203	2,273	Lena
SA48		Rio Branco	5,300	192,393	1,454	Rio Negro	(Note: Average discharge at near mouth, 1980–2006; Source or headwater: Rio Branco (main stem 802 km)–Uraricoera (length 652 km, drainage area 49,630 km², average discharge 1,500 m³/s) → Total length 1,454 km;)
SA49		Orinoco above Guaviare	5,294	100,975	890	Orinoco	(Note: Average discharge, 1971–2000;)
SA50		Javary	5,194	108,966	1,309	Solimões
AF51	Ogooué		5,142	225,548	1,200	Atlantic Ocean
AU52	Mamberamo		5,014	78,957	1,112	Pacific Ocean	(Note: Average discharge at Mamberamo Delta 158.23 km³/year (2003–2012); Source or headwaters: Mamberamo (main stem 283 km)–Taritatu (main stem 650 km, drainage area 47,803 km², average discharge 2,703 m³/s)–Waruta (179 km, 4,296 km², 123 m³/s) → Total length 1,112 km;)
AU53	Sepik		5,000	80,386	1,126	Bismarck Sea	(Note: Average discharge at Angoram, 1964–1980;)
SA54		Caroní	4,981	95,442	952	Orinoco
SA55		Juruena	4,937	192,628	1,240	Tapajós
EU56	Pechora		4,877	312,763	1,826	Pechora Sea
SA57		Paraná do Urariá–Canumã	4,804	133,212	1,268	Amazon	(Note: Average discharge at near mouth, 1971–2000; Source or headwater: Paraná do Urariá (main stem 408 km)–Canumã (main stem 218 km, drainage area 52,208 km², average discharge 2,135 m³/s)–Sucunduri (687 km, 26,541 km², 943 m³/s) → Total length 1,313 km;)
AS58		Upper Meghna	4,753	69,871	1,040	Old Brahmaputra, Lower Meghna
AS59		Chindwin	4,740	114,685	1,207	Irrawaddy
AS60	Rajang		4,715	52,009	773	South China Sea
SA61		Paraguay	4,696	1,120,154	2,621	Paraná
AS62		Gan	4,658	162,225	885	Yangtze	(Note: Average discharge from the Lake Poyang into the Yangtze River is 147 km³/year (1960–2022); Total drainage area 162,225 km²; Source or headwater: Gan (main stem 572 km – Average discharge into the Lake Poyang 2,865 m³/s, drainage area 103,074 km²)–Lake Poyang–Gong (length 313 km, drainage area 27,074 km², 700 m³/s) → Total length 885 km;)
AS63	Barito		4,514	78,632	1,090	Java Sea	(Note: Average discharge at Barito Delta, 2003–2016; Source or headwater: Barito (main stem 832 km)–Murung (length 258 km, drainage area 7,411 km², average discharge 555 m³/s) → Total length 1,090 km;)
AF64		Ruki	4,500	175,293	1,296	Congo	(Note: Average discharge at near mouth, 1971–2000; Source or headwater: Ruki (main stem 105 km)–Busira (main stem 305 km, drainage area 123,669 km², average discharge 3,343 m³/s)–Tshuapa (886 km, 51,468 km², 1,422 m³/s) → Total length 1,296 km;)
SA65		Tocantins above Araguaia	4,448	308,345	2,167	Tocantins	(Note: Tocantins River above Araguaia River; Its average discharge at the mouth of the Araguaia 4,448 m³/s (period from 1971 to 2000); Source or headwater: Tocantins (upper Tocantins main stem 1,658 km → Total length lower and upper Tocantins 2,640 km)–Maranhão (main stem 392 km, drainage area 41,383 km², average discharge 699 m³/s)–Arraial Velho (117 km);)
SA66		Vaupés	4,345	64,370	1,381	Rio Negro
AS67	Red River		4,341	170,903	1,280	Gulf of Tonkin
AS68	Mahakam		4,278	77,095	980	Makassar Strait
AS69		Lower Tunguska	4,139	473,000	2,989	Yenisei
SA70	Atrato		4,138	36,231	750	Gulf of Urabá
AF71	Zambezi		4,134	1,474,004	3,421	Mozambique Channel	(Note: Average discharge at Zambezi Delta 130.39 km³/year (1962–2002); Source or headwater: Zambezi (main stem 2,389 km)–Lungwebungu (length 1,032 km, drainage area 44,368 km², average discharge 114 m³/s) → Total length 3,421 km; According to the latest research, the length of the Zambezi River from its traditional geographical source is 3,079 km (Zambia). The distance from the most remote source—at the headwaters of the Lungwebungu River in Angola—to the mouth is 3,421 km. In years when the Okavango experiences a good flood some of the water escapes east along the normally dry channel of the Magwekwana River into the Linyanti Swamp, thus entering the Zambezi basin (see → Kalahari Basin). According to the GRDC, the combined catchment area of the Zambezi and Okavango is 1,988,756 km².)
EU72		Kama	4,119	523,324	1,805	Volga
AS73	Kolyma		4,100	679,934	2,600	Kolyma Gulf
SA74		Apaporis	4,092	53,509	1,424	Japurá
SA75		Aripuanã	4,087	147,224	1,175	Madeira
NA76	Nelson		4,024	1,353,600	2,671	Hudson Bay	(Note: Source or headwater: Nelson (main stem 644 km)–Lake Winnipeg (Saskstchewan inflow–Nelson outflow 88 km)–Saskatchewan (main stem 547 km, drainage area 405,864 km², 634 m³/s)–South Saskatchewan (main stem 805 km, 131,442 km², 280 m³/s)–Bow (587 km, 23,862 km², 129 m³/s) → Total length 2,670 km;) (Note: Nelson with Churchill; Average water flow after diversions (see→Nelson River Hydroelectric Project); )
NA77	Fraser		3,972	245,452	1,375	Strait of Georgia
SA78		Huallaga	3,955	89,691	1,169	Marañón
SA79		Jutaí	3,859	79,374	1,174	Solimões
NA80	La Grande		3,808	209,000	893	James Bay	(Note: La Grande–Caniapiscau–Eastmain–Rupert; Average water flow after diversions (see→James Bay Project); )
NA81		Upper Mississippi	3,687	445,591	1,826	Mississippi	(Note: Mississippi River above Missouri River; Average discharge, 1980–1996;)
EU82	Northern Dvina		3,549	323,573	1,803	White Sea	(Note: Average discharge at Northern Dvina Delta, 1971–2000; Source or headwater: Northern Dvina (main stem 673 km)–Vychegda (length 1,130 km, drainage area 119,888 km², 1,160 m³/s) → Total length 1,803 km;)
AS83	Godavari		3,503	314,829	1,465	Bay of Bengal
SA84		Caura	3,500	49,530	723	Orinoco
AF85		Benue	3,477	338,968	1,440	Niger
SA86		Trombetas	3,437	126,973	764	Amazon
SA87		Inírida	3,385	53,795	1,300	Guaviare
NA88		Columbia above Snake	3,364	292,316	1,439	Columbia	(Note: Average discharge, 1968–2022;)
AF89		Kwango	3,317	270,904	1,702	Kasai
AS90		Ghaghara	3,278	131,948	1,167	Ganges
SA91		Paranaiba	3,216	223,582	1,194	Paraná
AS92	Khatanga		3,200	371,417	1,636	Khatanga Gulf	(Note: Average discharge at near mouth 101 km³/year (1984–2018); Source or headwater: Khatanga (main stem 227 km)–Kotuy (length 1,409 km, drainage area 176,000 km², average discharge 1,282 m³/s) → Total length 1,636 km;)
AS93		Subansiri	3,197	34,833	518	Brahmaputra
AU94	Eilanden		3,133	37,164	679	Arafura Sea	(Note: Eilanden River Basin)
AS95		Yenisei above Angara	3,090	344,000	1,843	Yenisei	(Note: Average discharge, 1971–2000; Source or headwater: Upper Yenisei (main stem 1,238 km)–Great Yenisei (length 605 km, drainage area 56,800 km², average discharge 599 m³/s);)
AF96	Nile		3,075	3,826,122	7,088	Mediterranean Sea	(Note: The Nile is usually said to be the longest river in the world, with a length of about 6,650 km, and the Amazon the second longest, with a length of at least 6,400 km. In 2007 and 2008, some scientists claimed that the Amazon has a length of 6,992 km and was longer than the Nile, whose length was calculated as 6,853 km. They achieved this result by adding the waterway from the Amazon's southern outlet through tidal canals and the Pará estuary of the Tocantins. The dispute is: "Is the channel south of Isla de Marajó to be treated as part of the Amazon, or as part of the Rio Tocantins?" A peer-reviewed article, published in 2009, states a length of 7,088 km for the Nile and 6,575 km for the Amazon, measured by using a combination of satellite image analysis and field investigations to the source regions. According to the Encyclopædia Britannica, as of 2020, the length of the Amazon remains open to interpretation and continued debate. Note that disputed values have been put in parentheses.) (Note: The average flow rate measured at the Atbara River estuary (at Atbara, Sudan) the most abundant point of the Nile (3,075 m³/s, 1971–2000); Average discharge at Aswan (Egypt) 2,800 m³/s, at Nile Delta 150 m³/s (2009–2018); The total topographic drainage basin of the Nile, including desert areas, is approximately 3,826,122 km² according to the GRDC; Source or headwater: Nile (main stem 2,950 km)–White Nile (main stem 2,300 km, drainage area 1,849,988 km², average discharge at Khartoum 903 m³/s)–Albert Nile (210 km, 428,830 km², 1,039 m³/s)–Lake Albert–Lake Kyoga–Victoria Nile (423 km, 351,576 km², 906 m³/s) –Lake Victoria (Kagera inflow–Victoria Nile outflow 280 km)–Kagera (main stem 572 km, 58,579 km², 346 m³/s)–Lake Rweru–Nyabarongo (main stem 271 km, 15,868 km², 112 m³/s)–Mwogo (main stem 14 km, 1,269 km², 11 m³/s)–Rukarara (49 km, 518 km², 4.8 m³/s) → Total length 7,088 km – The longest river in the world;)
AS97	Musi		3,066	59,942	759	South China Sea
SA98		Tigre	3,047	45,073	1,087	Marañón
SA99	São Francisco		3,037	638,324	2,863	Atlantic Ocean
SA100		Iriri	3,028	142,079	1,151	Xingu
AS101		Min	3,022	135,296	1,279	Yangtze	(Note: Average discharge at near mouth, 1961–2016; Source or headwater: Min (lower Min main stem 202 km)–Dadu with Marqu (length 1,076 km, drainage area 90,182 km², average discharge 1,670 m³/s) → Total length 1,279 km;)
AU102	Purari		3,000	33,773	902	Gulf of Papua
AS103		Yamuna	2,948	366,223	1,376	Ganges
AS104		Srepok	2,940	79,015	454	Mekong
SA105		Yarí	2,933	37,127	691	Caquetá
AS106		Panjnad	2,910	395,000	1,571	Indus
EU107	Rhine		2,900	190,522	1,233	North Sea	(Note: Total discharge at the Rhine–Meuse–Scheldt Delta 101 km³/year; The total combined catchment area is 224,000 km². The Rhine with the Maas River and the Ijssel delta branch;)
AS108		Xiang	2,848	102,148	948	Dongting Lake
AS109	Batang Hari		2,819	46,504	800	South China Sea
SA110		Guaporé	2,738	353,028	1,558	Mamoré
AS111	Pyasina		2,730	182,000	817	Kara Sea
SA112	Cuyuni		2,719	85,635	633	Atlantic Ocean	(Note: Entire Essequibo–Cuyuni Basin; Average discharge at near mouth 5,000 m³/s (154–178 km³/year), drainage area 158,407 km², length 1,014 km;) (Note: Average discharge at Bartica, period from 1996 to 2005;)
AS113		Mali Hka	2,693	23,221	320	Irrawaddy
NA114	Usumacinta		2,678	77,743	1,052	Bay of Campeche	(Note: Average discharge above Grijalva, 1979–2015; Source or headwater: Usumacinta (main stem 562 km)–Chixoy (main stem 446 km, drainage area 13,161 km², average discharge 551 m³/s)–Pacaranat (44 km, 945 km², 31.5 m³/s);) (Note: Entire Grijalva–Usumacinta Basin; Total length 1,123 km; Drainage area 127,676 km², average discharge 125–147 km³/year;)
SA115	San Juan		2,649	16,465	399	Pacific Ocean
AF116	Cross		2,647	52,257	489	Bight of Biafra
EU117	Neva		2,646	287,094	1,063	Gulf of Finland	(Note: Average discharge at Saint Petersburg, 1979–2015; Source or headwater: Neva (main stem 74 km)–Lake Ladoga–Volkhov (main stem 224 km, drainage area 79,500 km², average discharge 593 m³/s)–Lake Ilmen–Msta (main stem 445 km, 23,231 km², 209 m³/s)–Lake Mstino–Tsna (160 km, 4,518 km², 38 m³/s) → Total length 1,063 km;)
AS118		Songhua	2,591	557,180	1,927	Amur
SA119		Urubamba	2,579	59,071	915	Ucayali
AU120	Digul		2,578	29,175	853	Arafura Sea	(Note: Entire–Digul–Mappi Basin; Drainage area 46,947 km², average discharge at Digul Delta 3,028–3,867 m³/s;)
SA121		Casiquiare	2,574	82,800	731	Rio Negro
AF122		Sangha	2,570	191,953	1,459	Congo	(Note: Average discharge at near mouth, 1971–2000; Source or headwater: Sangha (lower Sangha main stem 440 km)–Ngoko (main stem 299 km, drainage area 74,854 km², average discharge 843 m³/s)–Dja (720 km, 39,860 km², 455 m³/s) → Total length 1,459 km;)
SA123		Apure	2,544	116,713	1,038	Orinoco
AS124		Kosi	2,500	88,185	729	Ganges
AS125	Kayan		2,463	33,005	576	Celebes Sea
AS126		Ghorautra	2,463	24,060	339	Upper Meghna
SA127		Pastaza	2,438	41,793	787	Marañón
NA128		Liard	2,434	277,100	1,215	Mackenzie
SA129		Ituí	2,422	43,035	796	Javary
AU130		Fly above Strickland	2,400	19,528	604	Fly
SA131		Paragua	2,389	39,605	550	Caroní
SA132	Essequibo		2,369	68,788	936	Atlantic Ocean	(Note: Essequibo above Cuyuni at Bartica; Average discharge 2,369 m³/s (1971–2000);)
AS133		Jialing	2,368	159,180	1,345	Yangtze
SA134		Cauca	2,364	59,840	1,180	Magdalena
NA135		Red River	2,349	241,388	2,189	Atchafalaya
SA136	Jacuí		2,327	82,618	800	Lagoa dos Patos
SA137		Içana	2,279	35,516	689	Rio Negro
SA138		Anapu	2,272	52,495	470	Furo do Tajapuru
AF139		Fimi	2,253	136,175	1,395	Kasai	(Note: Average discharge at near mouth, 1971–2000; Source or headwater: Fimi (main stem 190 km)–Lukenie (length 1,205 km, drainage area 69,259 km², average discharge 1,077 m³/s) → Total length 1,395 km;)
AF140	Sanaga		2,223	134,252	1,067	Bight of Biafra
AS141	Amu Darya		2,200	798,035	2,620	Aral Sea	(Note: Average water flow measured at the most abundant point, above the outlet of the Karakum Canal; Source or headwater: Amu Darya (main stem 1,699 km)–Panj (length 921 km, drainage area 116,799 km², average discharge 1,075 m³/s) → Total length 2,620 km;)
AF142		Aruwimi	2,200	121,163	1,287	Congo
AS143	Anadyr		2,160	199,406	1,146	Gulf of Anadyr
SA144		Ventuari	2,160	40,861	520	Orinoco
SA145		Curaray	2,155	26,775	1,011	Napo
AS146	Krishna		2,145	274,596	1,300	Bay of Bengal
NA147		Tennessee	2,140	105,870	1,049	Ohio
AS148		Lohit	2,138	29,330	560	Brahmaputra
SA149		Tapauá	2,135	63,185	745	Purus
AS150	Mahanadi		2,125	145,260	851	Bay of Bengal
NA151	Mobile–Alabama		2,118	124,158	1,263	Gulf of Mexico	(Note: Average discharge at near mouth, 1971–2000; Source or headwater: Mobile (main stem 72 km)–Alabama (main stem 512 km, drainage area 59,104 km², average discharge 1,023 m³/s)–Coosa (main stem 450 km, 26,364 km², 479 m³/s)–Oostanaula (main stem 79 km, 5,603 km², 117 m³/s)–Conasauga (150 km, 1,880 km², 41 m³/s) → Total length 1,263 km;)
AS152		Olyokma	2,110	209,378	1,436	Lena
AS153		Yuan	2,106	93,287	864	Dongting Lake
SA154		Ji-Paraná	2,100	76,127	820	Madeira
AF155		Lomami	2,062	109,080	1,875	Congo
AF156		Lulonga	2,040	82,952	952	Congo	(Note: Average discharge at near mouth, 1971–2000; Source or headwater: Lulonga (main stem 200 km)–Lopori (length 752 km, drainage area 37,794 km², average discharge 872 m³/s) → Total length 926 km;)
AS157		Gandak	2,025	46,300	814	Ganges
SA158	Maroni		2,000	66,184	725	Atlantic Ocean
AU159	Kikori		2,000	18,863	445	Gulf of Papua	(Note: Kikori River Basin)
SA160		Pachitea	1,992	28,648	587	Ucayali
AS161	Yellow River		1,990	988,063	5,778	Bohai Sea
AU162		Tariku	1,953	24,664	488	Mamberamo
NA163		Ottawa	1,949	147,406	1,271	St. Lawrence River
AS164		Stony Tunguska	1,945	249,000	1,865	Yenisei
AF165	Cuanza		1,944	163,832	1,274	Atlantic Ocean
AS166	Indigirka		1,933	360,400	1,726	East Siberian Sea
NA167	Churchill		1,931	106,898	856	Lake Melville
SA168		Caguán	1,929	21,276	596	Caquetá
AS169		Yalong	1,914	128,444	1,323	Jinsha
EU170	Rhône		1,900	99,298	812	Mediterranean Sea
NA171	Kuskokwim		1,897	124,319	1,130	Bering Sea
NA172	Saguenay		1,894	87,635	698	Estuary of St. Lawrence
AS173	Min		1,870	60,040	577	Taiwan Strait
AS174		Kopili	1,847	20,068	341	Brahmaputra
AS175	Baram		1,845	22,325	635	South China Sea
SA176		Iguaçu	1,836	67,537	1,320	Paraná
AS177		Lena above Vitim	1,811	200,700	1,686	Lena	(Note: Lena River above Vitim River (Upper Lena); Average discharge, 1971–2000;)
AS178		Zeya	1,807	232,077	1,242	Amur
NA179	Copper		1,794	67,204	480	Gulf of Alaska
SA180		Uatumã	1,790	68,477	701	Amazon
SA181	Courantyne		1,780	67,877	852	Atlantic Ocean
AS182	Great Tenasserim		1,778	19,637	616	Andaman Sea
NA183	Skeena		1,770	54,432	570	Hecate Strait
AS184	Taz		1,755	152,086	1,401	Taz Estuary
AS185	Cagayan		1,740	27,753	505	South China Sea
AF186		Sankuru	1,738	149,480	1,285	Kasai
EU187		Sava	1,722	97,713	992	Danube
SA188		Roosevelt	1,711	59,844	705	Aripuanã
AS189	Kaladan		1,704	22,611	744	Bay of Bengal	(Note: Kaladan with Lemro and Mayu at Kaladan Delta: drainage area 40,000 km², average discharge 3,476 m³/s;)
EU190	Dnieper		1,700	531,817	2,201	Black Sea
AS191		Wu	1,698	86,799	1,150	Yangtze
AS192		Vilyuy	1,683	454,000	2,650	Lena
SA193		Jamanxim	1,673	58,001	700	Tapajós
NA194	Stikine		1,670	51,316	546	Pacific Ocean
AS195		Manas	1,667	41,350	400	Brahmaputra
AS196		Han	1,640	165,306	1,577	Yangtze
AS197		Tonlé Sap	1,640	88,254	667	Mekong
AS198		Chenab	1,637	175,877	974	Panjnad
AS199	Dông Nai		1,635	46,858	586	South China Sea
AF200		Blue Nile	1,632	314,458	1,674	Nile
AF201		Lowa	1,625	52,087	615	Lualaba
AS202		Ussuri	1,620	195,047	897	Amur
NA203	San Juan del Norte		1,614	41,659	641	Caribbean Sea	(Note: Average discharge at near mouth, 1979–2015; Source or headwater: San Juan del Norte (main stem 209 km)–Lake Nicaragua (Tipitapa inflow–San Juan del Norte outflow 177 km)–Tipitapa (main stem 34 km, drainage area 6,739 km², average discharge 95 m³/s)–Lake Managua (Río Grande inflow–Tipitapi outflow 50 km)–Río Grande (145 km, 1,730 km², 16.5 m³/s)–San Rafael del Norte (19 km)–Quebrada La Breiera (7 km) → Total 641 km;)
SA204	Guayas		1,606	37,084	689	Gulf of Guayaquil
SA205	Araguari		1,604	43,265	560	Atlantic Ocean
AS206		Yu	1,604	89,677	1,152	Xun
NA207	Koksoak		1,600	94,311	588	Ungava Bay	(Note: Source or headwater: Koksoak (main stem 137 km)–Caniapiscau (length 737 km, drainage area 48,959 km², average discharge 882 m³/s) → Total length 874 km;)
SA208		Tarauaçá	1,573	54,879	906	Juruá
AS209	Kampar		1,570	24,548	580	Strait of Malacca
EU210	Po		1,560	71,057	652	Adriatic Sea
SA211		Dos Marmelos	1,557	27,572	560	Madeira
AS212		Bei	1,543	47,249	633	Pearl River
SA213	Guamá		1,542	49,846	903	Guajará Bay	(Note: Average dischsrge at near mouth, 1971–2000; Source or headwater: Guamá (main stem 83 km)–Capim (main stem 639 km, drainage area 36,669 km², average discharge 777 m³/s)–Ararandeua (181 km, 10,834 km², 194 m³/s) → Total length 903 km;) (Note: Entire Guamá–Acará–Moju Basin; Drainage area 87,390 km², average discharge 2,730 m³/s (period 1971 to 2006);)
AS214	Sittaung		1,540	34,265	421	Gulf of Martaban
SA215		Santiago	1,533	33,098	530	Marañón
AS216	Tigris		1,527	221,327	1,862	Shatt al-Arab	(Note: Average discharge at Shatt al-Arab Delta 105.7 km³/year (1977–2018); Tigris–Euphrates drainage area 1,140,000 km²;)
EU217		Usa	1,514	91,135	565	Pechora
AS218	Karnaphuli		1,510	13,965	270	Bay of Bengal
SA219		Vichada	1,502	27,624	1,002	Orinoco
SA220		Unini	1,501	27,433	530	Rio Negro
NA221	Grijalva		1,485	56,895	759	Bay of Campeche	(Note: Length: Grijalva–Mezcalapa–Cuilco 759 km; Average discharge, 1971–2000;)
AS222		Liu	1,472	58,270	571	Qian
NA223	Papaloapan		1,461	39,885	354	Bay of Campeche
SA224	Patía		1,453	23,995	430	Pacific Ocean
NA225		Arkansas	1,448	409,027	2,364	Mississippi
NA226	Susitna		1,442	49,470	504	Cook Inlet
NA227	Moose		1,440	114,729	543	James Bay
AU228	Bamu		1,437	19,346	390	Gulf of Papua	(Note: Bamu River Basin)
AS229	Qiantang		1,436	54,349	494	East China Sea
NA230	Albany		1,420	132,800	832	James Bay
AS231		Black River	1,419	57,947	910	Red River
AS232	Katingan		1,414	19,559	616	Java Sea
AF233	Volta		1,410	412,735	1,875	Gulf of Guinea
AF234	Betsiboka		1,407	61,893	531	Bombetoka Bay	(Note: Betsiboka River Basin)
SA235		Mazaruni	1,399	31,705	560	Cuyuní
SA236		Jamari	1,391	39,977	478	Madeira
SA237		Coari	1,389	35,588	599	Solimões
NA238	Thelon		1,370	238,839	1,234	Chesterfield Inlet
SA239		Demini	1,358	39,770	618	Rio Negro
AS240	Narmada		1,350	95,818	1,289	Gulf of Khambhat
AS241	Indragiri		1,339	22,758	500	Strait of Malacca
SA242		Jauaperi	1,337	39,824	592	Rio Negro
AS243		Dibang	1,337	12,503	324	Brahmaputra
SA244		Arinos	1,332	58,734	654	Juruena
EU245		Oka	1,327	244,308	1,520	Volga
AS246		Huai	1,317	172,079	1,078	Yangtze
AF247		Mbomou	1,317	168,608	1,055	Ubangi
AF248	Tsiribihina		1,316	49,467	430	Mozambique Channel	(Note: Tsiribihina River Basin)
SA249		Inambari	1,316	20,160	413	Madre de Dios
AS250		Pranahita	1,301	109,078	682	Godavari
SA251		Badajós	1,300	21,575	413	Solimões
AS252	Pahang		1,299	33,924	489	South China Sea
AS253		Uchur	1,293	113,000	812	Aldan
SA254		Takutu	1,280	42,528	371	Rio Branco
AS255	Sesayap		1,275	18,158	279	Celebes Sea
SA256	Oyapock		1,273	30,869	485	Atlantic Ocean
NA257		Tanana	1,263	113,959	1,061	Yukon
SA258		Ituxi	1,263	43,676	878	Purus
AS259		Son	1,245	70,228	784	Ganges
AS260		Kabul	1,243	92,572	700	Indus
AS261		Melawi	1,243	22,586	471	Kapuas
SA262	Doce		1,241	90,357	977	Atlantic Ocean
SA263		Tambopata	1,241	15,540	390	Madre de Dios
SA264		Siapa	1,238	22,170	438	Casiquiare
AF265		Kwilu	1,229	94,663	1,230	Kwango
SA266		Marié	1,227	25,266	800	Rio Negro
AS267		Kheta	1,223	100,000	604	Khatanga
AS268	Taymyra		1,220	119,957	840	Kara Sea
SA269		Jari	1,214	51,893	877	Amazon
AS270	Olenyok		1,210	212,044	2,292	Laptev Sea
NA271	Nottaway		1,208	74,326	776	James Bay
AF272	Chari		1,200	880,000	2,279	Lake Chad	(Note: Average discharge at N'Djamena, 1969–1999; Source or headwater: Chari (lower and middle Chari main stem 1,079 km)–Bahr Salamat with Bahr Aouk (length 1,200 km, drainage area 144,860 km², average discharge 130 m³/s) → Total length 2,279 km;)
AF273		Lindi	1,200	59,568	797	Congo
NA274	Susquehanna		1,199	72,147	715	Chesapeake Bay
SA275		Casanare	1,199	24,013	415	Meta
NA276		Rivière des Rochers–Athabasca	1,198	292,497	1,608	Slave	(Note: Average discharge, 1971–2000; Source or headwater: Rivière des Rochers (main stem 48 km)–Lake Athabasca (Athabasca inflow–Rivière des Rochers outflow 22 km)–Athabasca (length 1,538 km, drainage area 160,705 km², average discharge 784 m³/s) → Total length 1,608 km;)
SA277		Paranapanema	1,198	101,739	829	Paraná
SA278		Isiboro	1,194	21,117	505	Mamoré
AF279	Cavally		1,192	30,665	844	Gulf of Guinea
SA280		Tefé	1,190	24,269	630	Solimões
NA281	Saint John River		1,189	54,986	673	Bay of Fundy
AS282		Maya	1,188	171,000	1,053	Aldan
SA283	São Gonçalo Channel		1,186	62,250	492	Lagoa dos Patos
AS284	Kahayan		1,178	16,063	658	Java Sea
SA285		Tomo	1,169	20,156	830	Orinoco
AU286	Ramu		1,164	17,823	640	Bismarck Sea
NA287	Coatzacoalcos		1,163	23,956	325	Bay of Campeche
SA288		Curuçá	1,157	25,549	766	Javary
AS289	Pur		1,141	111,351	1,024	Taz Estuary
AF290		Lomela	1,139	39,655	881	Busira
SA291		Igapó-Açu	1,136	30,206	437	Autaz-Açu	(Note: Average discharge at near mouth, 1971–2000; Entire Autaz-Açu (Madeirinha) with Igapó-Açu and Parana do Mamori Basin: Autaz-Açu (Madeirinha) main stem 236 km, drainage area 45,792 km², average discharge 1,677 m³/s;)
AF292	Saint Paul River		1,125	20,317	485	Atlantic Ocean
AF293	Rufiji		1,115	204,639	1,400	Indian Ocean
SA294		Ibicuí	1,113	47,203	673	Uruguay
EU295	Vistula		1,112	194,424	1,213	Gdańsk Bay	(Note: Average discharge at near mouth, 1996–2005; Source or headwater: Vistlua (lower Vistula main stem 404 km)–Narew (main stem 37 km – total length 499 km, drainage area 75,175 km², average discharge 347 m³/s)–Bug (772 km, 38,712 km², 158 m³/s) → Total length 1,213 km;)
AF296		Ivindo	1,112	63,201	686	Ogooué
AS297		Tom	1,110	59,858	827	Ob
SA298		Morona	1,107	16,962	785	Marañón
AF299	Kouilou		1,100	61,707	560	Atlantic Ocean
AS300	Rokan		1,100	20,189	532	Strait of Malacca
SA301	Baker		1,100	26,816	182	Pacific Ocean
NA302		Willamette	1,099	28,949	301	Columbia
SA303		Nhamundá	1,094	28,609	617	Amazon
AS304	Yana		1,090	235,457	1,490	Laptev Sea
AF305	Benin		1,084	49,256	300	Bight of Benin	(Note: Benin River Basin)
NA306		Ouachita	1,078	62,850	974	Red River
AS307	Chao Phraya		1,077	188,419	1,207	Bay of Bangkok
AS308		Sekong	1,077	28,792	480	Srepok
SA309		Nanay	1,073	16,673	511	Amazon
AS310	Seruyan		1,067	13,329	395	Java Sea
AS311	Sampit		1,064	14,745	377	Java Sea
EU312	Don		1,062	458,694	1,950	Sea of Azov
AF313	Sofia		1,062	29,267	328	Mozambique Channel	(Note: Sofia River Basin)
AS314		Dong	1,056	33,567	523	Pearl River
AS315		Lô	1,055	34,809	470	Red River
AF316		Likouala-Mossaka	1,054	71,886	615	Congo
NA317		Tombigbee	1,052	52,029	480	Mobile
SA318		Aguaytía	1,051	11,353	374	Ucayali
AS319	Kamchatka		1,049	54,104	758	Pacific Ocean
AS320		Balleh	1,048	12,416	241	Rajang
AF321		Momboyo	1,045	44,211	827	Ruki
AF322	Moa		1,044	19,560	475	Atlantic Ocean
EU323		Belaya	1,042	141,609	1,430	Kama
AS324		Trishuli	1,032	19,918	362	Narayani
SA325		Erebato	1,030	11,074	195	Caura
NA326		White River	1,028	71,743	1,162	Mississippi
AS327	Euphrates		1,027	765,831	3,000	Shatt al-Arab	(Note: Average water flow measured at the most abundant point (32.4 km³/year, 1977–2018). The Euphrates River drainage basin, including the surrounding desert and semi-desert areas (such as the Syrian desert and parts of the Arabian Desert regions), covers approximately 765,831 km²; Source or headwater: Euphrates (main stem 2,278 km)–Murat (length 722 km, drainage area 44,851 km², average discharge 404 m³/s) → Total length 3,000 km;)
SA328		Pacajá	1,025	26,438	634	Anapu
NA329	Coco		1,024	26,952	841	Caribbean Sea
SA330	Catatumbo		1,023	27,770	399	Lake Maracaibo
SA331	Baudó		1,023	5,964	316	Pacific Ocean
NA332	Manicouagan		1,020	45,908	221	Estuary of St. Lawrence
AS333		Shweli	1,020	22,908	630	Irrawaddy
EU334		Little Northern Dvina	1,018	85,822	648	Northern Dvina	(Note: Northern Dvina above Vychegda; Average discharge, 1971–2000; Source or headwater: Little Northern Dvina (main stem 74 km)–Yug (length 574 km, drainage area 36,204 km², average discharge 516 m³/s) → Total length 648 km;)
AF335		Zambezi above Lungwebungu	1,015	170,010	690	Zambezi
AS336		Mun	1,015	119,868	1,162	Mekong
SA337	Esmeraldas		1,011	19,796	210	Pacific Ocean
SA338	Biobío		1,008	24,264	377	Pacific Ocean
SA339	Río Negro		1,007	197,542	1,135	Atlantic Ocean	(Note: Average discharge at Paso Córdova, 1927–1967; Multiannual average discharge at near mouth 900 m³/s;)
NA340		Wabash	1,007	85,177	810	Ohio
AF341		Ngounié	1,002	32,637	680	Ogooué
SA342	Parnaíba		1,000	344,112	1,344	Atlantic Ocean
NA343	Nushagak		1,000	35,396	497	Bering Sea
AS344		Tembesi	990	13,431	323	Batang Hari
AS345		Min above Dadu	986	33,947	533	Min	(Note: Average discharge, 1961–2016;)
SA346		Curicuriari	985	14,202	478	Rio Negro
SA347		Orteguaza	980	9,826	270	Caquetá
AS348		Dhansiri	979	12,780	352	Brahmaputra
AF349	Sassandra		978	75,335	840	Gulf of Guinea
AS350	Pawan		973	10,473	278	South China Sea
AF351		Maringa	972	32,799	726	Lulonga
SA352		Itacuat	971	17,509	600	Ituí
SA353	Paraíba do Sul		970	58,027	1,137	Atlantic Ocean
SA354	Mira		969	10,782	291	Pacific Ocean
AF355	Little Scarcies		967	18,552	332	Atlantic Ocean
AS356	Perak		958	15,180	404	Strait of Malacca
SA357	Rio das Mortes		957	61,714	995	Araguaia
SA358		Tapiche	954	18,627	641	Ucayali
AF359	Sewa		952	19,022	420	Atlantic Ocean
AS360		Chambal	952	143,219	1,024	Yamuna
SA361		Río Negro	952	71,154	903	Uruguay
SA362		Cahuinari	951	15,063	667	Caquetá
NA363	Río Grande de Matagalpa		950	18,445	555	Caribbean Sea
AF364		Sangha above Ngoko	950	84,197	912	Sangha	(Note: Average discharge, 1971–2000; Source or headwater: Sangha (upper Sangha main stem 305 km)–Kadei (length 607 km, drainage area 42,939 km², average discharge 503 m³/s) → Total length 912 km;)
AS365	Berau		949	16,993	593	Celebes Sea
SA366		Anajás	948	24,083	300	Amazon
NA367		Winnipeg	947	136,119	256	Lake Winnipeg
SA368		Maués Açu	941	26,329	443	Paraná do Urariá
EU369	Loire		940	117,356	1,006	Bay of Biscay
AS370		Bureya	940	70,141	739	Amur
SA371		Cuniuá	939	39,365	879	Tapauá
SA372		Tietê	937	72,168	1,150	Paraná
AF373		Katsina Ala	933	23,061	346	Benue
AS374		Tobol	932	426,000	1,591	Irtysh
NA375		Lacantún	932	17,658	288	Usumacinta
AS376		Teesta	929	12,466	470	Brahmaputra
EU377	Elbe		928	148,268	1,252	North Sea	(Note: Average discharge at near mouth, 1971–2000; Source or headwater: Elbe (main stem 821 km)–Vltava (length 431 km, drainage area 28,090 km², average discharge 150 m³/s) → Total length 1,252 km;)
AF378		Lokoro	928	48,912	694	Fimi	(Note: Fimi above Lukenie; Average discharge , 1971–2000; Source or headwater: Fimi or Lokoro (main stem 10 km)–Lake Mai-Ndombe (Lokoro inflow–Fimi outflow 140 km)–Lokoro (length 544 km, drainage area 20,039 km², average discharge 328 m³/s) → Total length 694 km;)
NA379	Nass		925	20,839	380	Portland Inlet
AU380		Ok Tedi	923	5,042	207	Fly
EU381		Tisza	920	157,186	966	Danube
SA382		Manu	919	13,210	394	Madre de Dios
SA383		Mesay	916	14,234	397	Yarí
SA384	Acará		915	29,296	390	Guajará Bay
AS385	Yalu		913	65,216	845	Yellow Sea
NA386		Burntwood	912	285,806	381	Nelson	(Note: Average water flow after diversions (see→Nelson River Hydroelectric Project);)
AS387	Brahmani		903	57,358	799	Bay of Bengal
AF388		Ulindi	902	31,190	803	Congo
AF389		Lualaba above Luvua	901	171,000	1,096	Lualaba
AS390		Chara	900	87,600	851	Olyokma
AS391		Jhelum	895	51,052	816	Chenab
SA392		Atabapo	895	12,531	185	Guaviare
AS393	Kotawaringin		893	13,896	352	Java Sea
SA394	Suriname		893	24,868	480	Atlantic Ocean
AF395	Rovuma		891	155,316	998	Mozambique Channel
EU396		Vyatka	890	128,713	1,314	Kama
SA397		Aguarico	889	13,405	503	Napo
EU398	Mezen		886	78,760	966	White Sea
AU399	Mappi		885	13,719	525	Arafura Sea
SA400		Tiquié	885	12,705	356	Vaupés
AS401	Agusan		884	10,921	400	Bohol Sea
NA402	George		881	41,699	563	Ungava Bay
SA403		Curuá	871	34,693	585	Iriri
AS404	Han		870	30,112	410	South China Sea
SA405		Jaú	869	18,897	587	Rio Negro
NA406		Kootenay	868	50,298	780	Columbia
AS407		Parlung Tsangpo	868	28,631	266	Yarlung Tsangpo
SA408		Fresco	866	43,771	560	Xingu
AF409	Saint John River		864	16,157	351	Atlantic Ocean
NA410	Alsek		863	28,023	386	Gulf of Alaska
SA411		Arauca	863	29,587	1,050	Orinoco
NA412		Cumberland	862	46,830	1,106	Ohio
AS413		Northern Sosva	860	89,700	754	Ob
NA414	Sacramento		856	77,209	719	Suisun Bay	(Note: Entire Sacramento–San Joaquin River basin: Average discharge at Sacramento–San Joaquin River Delta 1,100–1,268 m³/s, drainage area 163,000 km²;)
AS415		Indaw Chaung	854	9,352	308	Irrawaddy
SA416		Yavarí-Mirim	853	14,631	347	Javary
AS417	Rio Grande de Mindanao		852	23,169	373	Moro Gulf
NA418	Escondido		850	11,650	263	Caribbean Sea
NA419		Pend Oreille	850	67,056	771	Columbia
SA420		Abunã	848	32,099	705	Madeira
AS421		Siyom	843	5,818	170	Siang
NA422		Thompson	841	55,417	489	Fraser
SA423		Nechí	841	14,613	252	Cauca
AS424	Kinabatangan		840	16,796	563	Sulu Sea
NA425		Illinois	839	72,701	567	Mississippi	(Note: Average discharge, 1980–1996; Source or headwater: Illinois (main stem 353 km)–Kankakee (length 214 km, drainage area 13,300 km², average discharge 137 m³/s);)
AS426		Kapuas	838	14,473	715	Barito
SA427		Purui	828	15,439	633	Japurá
NA428	Patuca		825	23,513	592	Caribbean Sea
SA429		Ichilo	824	17,405	632	Mamoré
SA430		Pauini	821	25,234	690	Purus
AS431		Qu	814	38,916	723	Jialing
SA432		Igara-Paraná	810	12,945	540	Putumayo
AS433		Atrai	801	22,876	390	Brahmaputra
AS434	Uda		800	64,511	457	Uda Bay
SA435	Palena		800	12,887	240	Pacific Ocean
AS436		Tuba	800	36,900	507	Yenisei	(Note: Average discharge, 1971–2000; Source or headwater: Tuba (main stem 119 km)–Kazyr (388 km);)
AF437		Lulua	798	70,613	1,184	Kasai
AS438		Nam Theun	798	14,650	246	Mekong
AS439		Kamla	797	8,101	183	Subansiri
AS440		Kochechum	796	96,400	733	Lower Tunguska
SA441		Corrientes	795	13,001	680	Tigre
AS442		Zi	795	29,521	653	Dongting Lake
AS443	Lemro		793	10,127	297	Bay of Bengal
AU444		Baliem	791	12,974	414	Eilanden
EU445		Svir	790	76,428	726	Lake Ladoga	(Note: Average discharge at near mouth, 1971–2000; Source or headwater: Svir (main stem 224 km)–Lake Onega (Vodla inflow–Svir outflow 96 km)–Vodla (main stem 149 km, drainage area 13,700 km², average discharge 130 m³/s)–Lake Vodlozero–Ileksa (155 km, 3,950 km², 25 m³/s) → Total length 726 km;)
AS446		Chulym	788	134,000	2,129	Ob
AS447		Omolon	788	118,600	1,114	Kolyma
SA448		Uvá	783	14,814	597	Guaviare
SA449		Jatapu	783	34,751	525	Uatumã
AS450		Kameng	781	10,841	264	Brahmaputra
SA451		Las Piedras	780	18,989	784	Madre de Dios
SA452		Envira	779	26,606	877	Tarauaçá
AU453		Uwimmerah	777	6,437	435	Digul
AS454		Karun	776	71,980	867	Shatt al-Arab
AF455		Itimbiri	773	53,351	700	Congo
AS456		Banghiang	773	19,543	370	Mekong
NA457		Koyukuk	770	81,326	805	Yukon
NA458	Great Whale River		767	42,735	726	Ungava Bay
AS459	Cả		767	27,350	531	Gulf of Tonkin
AS460		Myittha	767	24,466	580	Chindwin
AS461		Gui	767	18,793	426	Xi
SA462		Manissauá-Miçu	765	28,126	477	Xingu
SA463	Bueno		760	17,210	200	Pacific Ocean
SA464	Coppename		759	24,868	480	Atlantic Ocean
SA465	Santa Cruz		758	28,056	477	Atlantic Ocean
AS466		Gyaing	758	9,531	250	Salween
AS467		Nam Ou	755	26,160	459	Mekong
AS468		Taseyeva	751	128,000	1,319	Angara
NA469	Apalachicola		750	51,413	962	Gulf of Mexico	(Note: Source or headwater: Apalachicola (main stem 260 km)–Chattahoochee (length 702 km, drainage area 22,610 km², 339 m³/s) → Total length 962 km;)
SA470		Itacaiúnas	750	41,418	560	Tocantins
AF471		Mbam	750	43,209	548	Sanaga
SA472		Abacaxis	745	21,848	724	Paraná do Urariá
SA473		Jandiatuba	745	14,890	716	Solimões
SA474		Huayabamba	743	13,875	218	Huallaga
SA475		Paru de Este	740	39,289	731	Amazon
AS476		Bahau	740	9,187	322	Kayan
SA477		Sipapo	740	13,918	257	Orinoco
EU478		Inn	739	26,053	518	Danube
SA479		Novo	739	16,140	364	Jamanxim
AS480		Sunkoshi	739	18,195	226	Koshi
SA481		Paranã	738	59,313	677	Tocantins
AS482	Penzhina		737	78,794	713	Penzhina Bay
SA483		Ivaí	733	36,587	798	Paraná
NA484		Saint-Maurice River	730	41,994	563	St. Lawrence River
SA485		Curuá-Una	730	31,116	315	Amazon
EU486	Glomma		728	42,441	621	Skagerrak
AU487	Mitchell		727	71,757	750	Gulf of Carpentaria
SA488		Limay	726	61,723	380	Río Negro
AS489		Myitnge	724	47,023	523	Irrawaddy
AS490	Hai He		723	320,600	1,329	Bohai Sea
NA491	Severn		722	104,062	804	Hudson Bay
AF492		Chari above Bahr Salamat	721	322,360	501	Chari	(Note: Average discharge, 1971–2000;)
AF493	Ntem		718	33,527	460	Bight of Biafra
AS494		Nen	718	248,988	1,223	Songhua
AF495		Luangwa	716	147,622	1,042	Zambezi
AS496		Vakhsh	716	38,707	786	Amu Darya
SA497		Suia-Miçu	716	31,118	519	Xingu
SA498		Tamaya	716	14,117	478	Ucayali
SA499		Sono	716	45,687	383	Tocantins
AS500		Selemdzha	715	68,390	585	Zeya
SA501	Pascua		714	14,760	62	Pacific Ocean
AS502		Joloi	714	8,269	170	Barito
AS503		Nam Ngum	710	16,640	354	Mekong
AF504		Mongala	709	52,355	663	Congo
NA505		Chitina	706	21,800	274	Copper
AF506	Senegal		703	847,273	1,689	Atlantic Ocean
AS507	Kura		703	218,906	1,514	Caspian Sea
AU508		Aramia	702	10,716	463	Bamu
SA509	San Juan de Micay		701	4,475	206	Pacific Ocean
NA510	Prinzapolka		700	11,292	332	Caribbean Sea
SA511	Cisnes		700	5,512	160	Pacific Ocean
AF512		Alima	700	23,193	577	Congo
AS513		Uyu	699	11,451	347	Chindwin
NA514		Peel	698	74,656	684	Mackenzie
EU515	Neman		694	95,298	937	Curonian Lagoon
NA516	Winisk		694	62,119	665	Hudson Bay
NA517	Hayes		694	94,019	633	Hudson Bay
AS518		Gonam	694	55,600	686	Uchur
AS519	Bengawan Solo		693	15,296	600	Java Sea
NA520	Koukdjuak		689	66,543	490	Foxe Basin
SA521		Taquari	689	26,428	554	Jacuí
SA522	Valdivia		687	11,483	140	Pacific Ocean
SA523		Mapuera	686	25,903	373	Trombetas
SA524		Jaci Paraná	685	13,198	382	Madeira
AS525	Siak		684	11,214	370	Strait of Malacca
SA526		Yaguas	683	10,863	475	Putumayo
AS527		Sesan	683	18,967	454	Srépok
EU528	Buna–Drin		682	19,686	339	Adriatic Sea
AF529	Konkouré		681	17,046	328	Baie de Sangareya
EU530	Garonne		680	56,020	529	Gironde	(Note: Gironde (entire Garonne–Dordogne basin): length 75 km, drainage area 84,811 km², average discharge 1,141 m³/s);)
EU531	Daugava		678	83,416	1,020	Gulf of Riga
NA532	Leaf		678	45,728	517	Hudson Bay
AF533		Elila	678	27,360	670	Lualaba
AS534		Tanai Hka	678	7,807	252	Chindwin
AS535	Kaveri		677	81,155	800	Bay of Bengal
AU536		Erave	671	5,875	224	Purari
AS537	Han-Gang		670	34,397	514	Yellow Sea
NA538	Arnaud		670	51,155	446	Hudson Bay
SA539	Puelo		670	8,817	120	Pacific Ocean
SA540		Río Blanco	670	76,916	670	Guaporé
SA541		Paru de Oeste	670	41,879	637	Trombetas
NA542	Ulúa		669	22,817	417	Bay of Campeche
AS543		Ket	668	94,200	1,621	Ob
NA544	Hudson		664	36,893	507	Lower New York Bay
SA545		Acre	664	35,912	930	Purus
AS546		Kureyka	664	44,700	888	Yenisei
SA547		Ronuro	664	30,435	468	Xingu
AS548		Sankosh	664	12,061	321	Brahmaputra
AF549	Omo		660	86,657	1,104	Lake Turkana
AU550	Turama		660	5,879	302	Gulf of Papua
AS551		Amgun	660	54,603	723	Amur
AS552		Zuo	659	34,212	539	Yu
AS553		Kirenga	658	46,669	746	Lena
SA554		Orthon	657	33,709	1,293	Beni	(Note: Average discharge, 1971–2000; Source or headwater: Orthon–Tahuamanu;)
AS555		Vakh	656	76,700	964	Ob
SA556		Manicoré	655	11,163	554	Madeira
NA557		aux Mélèzes	654	42,735	297	Koksoak
AS558		Dihing	653	5,975	380	Brahmaputra
EU559		Vuoksi	653	72,867	162	Lake Ladoga
AF560	Nyanga		651	25,075	600	Atlantic Ocean
SA561	Tuira		651	10,788	230	Pacific Ocean
EU562	Douro		650	97,109	897	Atlantic Ocean
SA563	Futaleufú		650	10,979	246	Pacific Ocean
SA564	Gurupí		648	35,058	720	Atlantic Ocean
NA565		Great Bear River	647	162,693	676	Mackenzie	(Note: Average discharge at near mouth, 1971–2000; Source or headwater: Great Bear River (main stem 115 km)–Great Bear Lake–Camsell (length 420 km, drainage area 31,030 km², average discharge 110 m³/s) → Total length 676 km;)
AU566		Sobger	645	7,196	180	Taritatu
NA567	Little Mecatina		643	17,903	547	Gulf of St. Lawrence
AF568		Kaduna	642	65,878	575	Niger
SA569		Mutum	642	12,772	300	Jutaí
AS570	Ou		640	18,028	388	South China Sea
AF571		Salonga	640	21,388	659	Busira
AS572	Mã		637	29,912	512	Gulf of Tonkin
AS573		Nam Pawn	637	18,881	338	Salween
SA574		Carún	637	8,179	280	Paragua
SA575		Pasimoni	636	10,389	273	Casiquiare
AS576		Damodar	636	43,096	676	Hooghly
SA577		Tuparro	634	10,311	460	Orinoco
AS578		Gilgit	632	27,368	251	Indus
SA579		Sangue	630	29,059	509	Juruena
SA580		Cuchivero	630	17,320	384	Orinoco
AS581	Sembakung		628	9,518	322	Celebes Sea
SA582	Aysén		628	11,674	171	Pacific Ocean
AF583		Kotto	627	80,942	906	Ubangi
NA584	Attawapiskat		626	54,646	748	James Bay
SA585		Anauá	625	21,304	434	Purus
AU586		Yuat	625	11,353	373	Sepik
NA587		Porcupine	623	116,431	916	Yukon
AF588	Wouri		620	11,700	262	Wouri Estuary	(Note: Entire Wouri with Dibamba and Mungo basin: drainage area 19700 km², average discharge 1096–1389 m³/s;)
NA589	Pánuco		619	92,037	510	Gulf of Mexico
SA590	Mearim		617	56,687	930	Baía de São Marcos	(Note: Entire Mearim–Pindaré basin: drainage area 98,289–101,061 km², average dischage 1,153–1,200 m³/s;)
SA591		Itonamas	615	123,853	1,700	Guaporé
AF592		Donga	615	19,972	406	Benue
OC593	Clutha		614	17,119	338	Pacific Ocean
SA594		Papagaio	613	22,383	350	Juruena
NA595	Back		612	106,037	974	Chantrey Inlet
AS596	Brantas		612	11,973	320	Bali Sea
AS597	Thu Bôn		611	10,350	205	South China Sea
SA598		Parana Copea	611	10,532	348	Solimões
AS599		Nampuk Hka	611	6,900	289	Chindwin
AS600	Nadym		610	53,129	545	Gulf of Ob
SA601		Piquiri	607	24,156	665	Paraná
SA602		Padauari	607	17,384	376	Rio Negro
NA603	Connecticut		606	31,536	655	Long Island Sound
AS604		Torsa	604	12,183	220	Brahmaputra
AF605		Shire	602	161,058	1,200	Zambezi	(Note: Average discharge, 1971–2000; Source or headwater: Shire (main stem 439 km)–Lake Malawi (Ruhuhu inflow–Shire outflow 431 km)–Ruhuhu (length 330 km, drainage area 14,864 km², average discharge 132 m³/s) → Total length 1,200 km;)
SA606		Perené	602	18,352	294	Tambo
EU607	Göta älv		601	51,451	723	Kattegat
SA608		Acari	601	14,226	564	Canumã
AS609		Sangker	601	28,764	250	Tonlé Sap
AF610		Anjobony	601	15,524	204	Sofia
NA611	Colville		600	63,433	659	Beaufort Sea
NA612	Taku		600	19,336	359	Gulf of Alaska
SA613	Imperial		600	12,763	230	Pacific Ocean
SA614		Samiria	600	11,052	353	Marañón
AF615	Mangoky		597	55,750	714	Mozambique Channel
AS616		Tunguska	596	30,070	544	Amur
AF617	Nyong		595	27,887	690	Bight of Biafra
NA618		White River	595	47,666	322	Yukon
NA619	Kvichak		590	16,830	431	Kvichak Bay
AF620	Lofa		590	10,446	410	Atlantic Ocean
NA621		Parsnip	590	22,597	240	Peace
NA622		Yentna	590	16,006	130	Susitna
SA623	Ribeira de Iguape		589	24,753	470	Atlantic Ocean
NA624	Wheeler		589	31,857	400	Ungava Bay
SA625		Cuiabá	589	109,241	1,011	Paraguay
SA626		Prêto	588	10,470	346	Ji-Paraná
AF627	Bandama		583	98,751	1,050	Atlantic Ocean
EU628	Oder		582	119,846	854	Szczecin Lagoon
AS629		Kedang Kepala	582	15,704	324	Mahakam
AF630	Cestos		581	12,723	476	Atlantic Ocean
EU631		Vistula above Narew	580	84,670	643	Vistula	(Note: Average discharge, 1971–2000;)
AS632	Tapti		579	66,331	724	Gulf of Khambhat
AS633		Rapti	579	44,185	644	Ganges
SA634		Telembí	579	4,644	175	Patía
AF635	Mahavavy Sud		578	16,475	410	Mozambique Channel
SA636		Crepori	578	13,542	404	Tapajós
EU637	Ebro		577	82,841	930	Atlantic Ocean
NA638	Harricana		577	29,267	533	James Bay
EU639		Drava	577	40,154	719	Danube
AS640		Sharda	576	19,507	483	Ghaghara
EU641	Kemijoki		575	53,542	552	Gulf of Bothnia
AU642	Bian		572	8,862	581	Arafura Sea
SA643	Toltén		572	8,398	123	Pacific Ocean
AS644		Shilka	571	206,000	1,480	Amur
SA645		Peixoto de Azevedo	570	19,511	330	Teles Pires
SA646		Anauá	569	21,304	434	Rio Branco
SA647		Biá	568	12,778	492	Jutaí
SA648		Pardo	566	35,673	531	Rio Grande
SA649	Pindaré		565	40,482	686	Baía de São Marcos
SA650	Approuague		564	10,681	335	Atlantic Ocean
EU651	Seine		563	76,238	777	English Channel
SA652		Manacacías	561	10,053	468	Meta
NA653	Santee		560	39,837	708	Atlantic Ocean	(Note: Source or headwater: Santee (main stem 237 km)–Wateree (main stem 121 km, drainage area 14,573 km², average discharge 207 m³/s)–Catawba (350 km, 5,477 km², 93 m³/s) → Total length 708 km;)
AS654	Singkil		560	12,363	368	Andaman Sea
SA655		Manacapuru	560	14,103	291	Solimões
AF656		Bani	559	129,494	1,100	Niger
AS657		Anyuy	559	108,134	746	Kolyma
EU658		Aare	559	17,779	292	Rhine
AS659		Adycha	558	89,800	715	Yana
AS660		Belayan	557	9,977	319	Mahakam
AF661	Corubal		555	24,400	675	Canal do Geba
NA662	Pee Dee		552	46,531	569	Winyah Bay	(Note: Source or headwater: Pee Dee (main stem 373 km)–Yadkin (length 346 km, drainage area 10,805 km², average discharge 168 m³/s) → Total length 719 km;)
AS663		Nam Teng	551	15,229	449	Salween
AS664		Lishui	551	19,745	437	Songli Hongdao, Dongting Lake
NA665	Delaware		550	36,568	579	Delaware Bay
AS666	Anabar		548	94,023	939	Kara Sea
NA667	Moisie		547	19,273	410	Gulf of St. Lawrence
AF668	Rokel		547	10,622	386	Atlantic Ocean
AU669	Markham		546	13,264	300	Huon Gulf
SA670		Sogamoso	546	23,249	389	Magdalena
NA671		Kenogami	546	51,111	331	Albany
SA672		Ivinheima	545	38,200	595	Paraná
AS673	Barumun		544	13,384	440	Strait of Malacca
AS674	Syr Darya		542	1,113,531	3,019	Aral Sea	(Note: Average discharge at Tyumen-Aryk, 1930–1984; Source or headwater: Syr Darya (main stem 2,212 km)–Naryn (length 807 km, drainage area 60,782 km², average discharge 429 m³/s) → Total length 3,019 km;)
AU675		Digul Timur	541	3,166	196	Digul
EU676	Onega		540	59,359	562	White Sea
AS677		Beas	540	19,746	251	Sutlej
SA678		Bóia	540	10,907	369	Jutaí
SA679		Kaká	539	21,474	287	Beni
AS680	Sambas		538	7,965	233	South China Sea
SA681		Rupununi	538	23,684	315	Essequibo
AS682		Timpton	537	44,400	644	Aldan
AS683	Kelantan		536	11,900	248	South China Sea
SA684		Palcazu	534	9,689	207	Pachitea
SA685	Maule		533	21,291	240	Pacific Ocean
SA686		Mazán	533	7,721	509	Napo
AS687		Fu	531	36,003	670	Jialing
SA688		Yacuma	530	17,200	627	Mamoré
SA689		Pardo	529	39,419	600	Paraná
SA690		São Benedito	525	13,797	360	Teles Pires
SA691	Camaquã		524	16,911	430	Lagoa dos Patos
SA692		Potaro	521	6,842	255	Essequibo
OC693	Waiau		520	7,904	169	Foveaux Strait
SA694		Daule	520	13,570	380	Guayas
AS695		Tuo	519	27,866	655	Yangtze
EU696	Ångermanälv		518	31,864	463	Gulf of Bothnia
AS697	Shinano		518	14,812	367	Sea of Japan
SA698		Portuguesa	518	49,731	624	Apure
AS699	Labuk		517	6,829	260	Sulu Sea
NA700		Kanawha	517	31,282	877	Ohio
AF701		Chinko	517	53,071	695	Mbomou
AS702		Mahananda	516	13,487	240	Ganges
SA703		Macucuaú	516	15,801	165	Jauaperi
EU704	Luleälv		515	25,241	461	Gulf of Bothnia
NA705	Klamath		515	40,795	423	Pacific Ocean
AF706	Mbini		515	13,560	365	Atlantic Ocean
AS707		Indravati	514	40,769	510	Godavari
SA708		Tamaná	514	2,831	91	San Juan
SA709		Tapanahony	513	19,826	356	Maroni
SA710		Padamo	512	9,984	238	Orinoco
NA711	Kobuk		510	42,755	600	Hotham Inlet
NA712		Stewart	510	51,023	533	Yukon
SA713		Apere	510	14,987	438	Mamoré
SA714		Gálvez	510	10,608	190	Yavarí-Mirim
SA715		Capanaparo	509	18,959	636	Orinoco
AF716		Anyim	509	16,368	262	Cross
SA717		Guariba	508	16,286	542	Aripuanã
EU718		Saône	508	29,321	473	Rhône
AS719		Tizu	508	7,295	289	Chindwin
NA720	Thlewiaza		507	63,428	683	Hudson Bay
SA721	Naya		507	2,649	120	Pacific Ocean
AS722		Kunar	507	25,815	392	Kabul
SA723		Jarauçu	507	16,726	337	Xingu
AS724		Beipan	506	24,485	449	Hongshui
SA725		Tebicuary	506	25,375	360	Paraguay
SA726	Turiaçu		504	14,394	560	Baía de Turiaçu
AS727	Kemena		502	5,766	190	South China Sea
AF728		Lufira	502	51,480	911	Lualaba
AS729		Ataran	502	5,930	249	Salween
AS730		Betwa	501	44,185	610	Yamuna
AF731		Nepoko	501	21,761	495	Aruwimi
NA732	Balsas		500	122,987	720	Pacific Ocean
AF733		Oti	500	75,692	1,102	Volta
SA734		Colorado	500	3,736	135	Madre de Dios
SA735		Paracatu	499	45,169	507	São Francisco
NA736		Yazoo	498	34,328	613	Mississippi
AS737		Sabari	498	21,506	418	Godavari
SA738		Mucajaí	495	20,358	565	Rio Branco
SA739		Pucacuro	495	6,777	431	Tigre
AS740	Lalan		494	12,114	251	South China Sea
AF741	Pungwe		492	32,244	417	Mozambique Channel	(Note: Pungwe River Basin)
AU742	Momats		492	8,862	380	Arafura Sea
AF743		Logone	492	101,481	1,063	Chari	(Note: Average discharge at Bongor, 1951–1984;)
SA744		Cuiuni	492	11,776	563	Rio Negro
AS745		Youshui	492	18,763	484	Yuan
AS746	Ishikari		491	13,783	268	Sea of Japan
AS747	Bago		490	7,577	331	Gulf of Martaban
AS748	Lupar		490	6,558	275	South China Sea
SA749		Dos Apiacás	490	16,091	313	Teles Pires
AF750		Loange	489	41,800	865	Kasai
SA751		Bacajá	489	25,757	382	Xingu
AS752		Nam Pang	489	12,427	325	Salween
SA753		San Miguel	489	5,629	295	Putumayo
NA754	Kennebec		488	24,591	270	Gulf of Maine
OC755	Buller		488	6,475	177	Tasman Sea
SA756		Uneiuxi	488	12,475	555	Rio Negro
SA757		Xié	488	8,222	293	Rio Negro
SA758		Cara Paraná	487	7,266	487	Putumayo
SA759	Sinú		486	18,478	415	Caribbean Sea
AS760	Tavoy		484	4,399	190	Andaman Sea
AF761	Mahajamba		483	14,883	298	Mozambique Channel
NA762		Unknown River–Atikonak	483	23,924	332	Churchill
NA763		Harrison	481	8,373	177	Fraser
AF764		Ouham	480	83,237	917	Chari
SA765		Tuichi	480	9,050	323	Beni
SA766	Mana		479	12,203	462	Atlantic Ocean
NA767		San Juan	479	9,742	398	Papaloapan
AS768	Tone		478	15,739	322	Pacific Ocean
AS769	Bang Pakong		478	22,005	294	Bay of Bangkok
AS770		Disang	478	4,415	253	Brahmaputra
AS771	Tulang Bawang		477	9,711	409	Java Sea
AF772	Jong		477	8,288	249	Atlantic Ocean
AS773		Biya	477	37,000	301	Ob
AS774	Jiulong		476	14,241	285	Taiwan Strait
NA775	Skagit		475	8,183	240	Puget Sound
AF776	Maningory		472	12,646	260	Indian Ocean
SA777		Papurí	472	6,838	241	Vaupés
AS778		Landak	472	8,462	178	Kapuas
AU779		Mubi	472	4,591	160	Kikori
SA780	Itapecuru		470	54,908	1,050	Baía do Arraial
NA781	Noatak		470	32,989	684	Kotzebue Sound
SA782		Cinaruco	470	11,604	568	Orinoco
NA783		South Nahanni	469	36,690	560	Liard
AS784		Jian	469	16,483	295	Min
SA785		Moju	468	12,961	571	Acará
AF786		Likouala-aux-Herbes	467	29,981	614	Sangha
SA787		Tibagi	467	25,239	550	Paranapanema
AS788		Qing	467	16,697	423	Yangtze
SA789		Chambira	467	9,258	226	Marañón
AS790	Ili		466	212,329	1,439	Lake Balkhash	(Note: Average discharge at Kapchagay, 1988–2013;)
AF791		Sobat	466	437,413	1,125	White Nile	(Note: Average discharge at Jikmir, 1971–2000; Source or headwater: Sobat (main stem 354 km)–Pibor (main stem 322 km, drainage area 372,217 km², average discharge 186 m³/s)–Kangen (449 km);)
AS792		Tungabhadra	466	71,417	678	Krishna
EU793	Weser		465	45,807	744	North Sea
SA794	Jequitinhonha		464	68,016	727	Atlantic Ocean
AU795	Kamundan		464	5,640	422	Berau Gulf
NA796		Kazan	464	72,852	1,000	Baker Lake
AS797		Tavda	462	88,100	1,384	Tobol
SA798		Ajajú	461	7,813	305	Apaporis
AU799	Murray		460	1,061,469	3,672	Southern Ocean	(Note: Average discharge at Wentworth, 1920–2010; Source or headwater: Murray (lower Murray main stem 828 km)–Darling (main stem 1,545 km, drainage area 609,283 km², average discharge 38.5 m³/s)–Culgoa with Balonne (main stem 642 km, 146,317 km², 88.5 m³/s)–Condamine (657 km, 29,862 km², 38.4 m³/s) → Total length 3,672 km – The longest river in the Australia and Oceania;)
SA800		Mantaro	460	34,547	809	Ené
EU801		Pripyat	460	119,911	761	Dnieper
AS802		Velymo	460	33,800	504	Stony Tunguska
SA803		Urubu	460	13,892	430	Amazon
AS804		Tromyogan	459	55,600	603	Ob
AS805		Komering	459	9,908	359	Musi
EU806		Sukhona	458	47,264	558	Northern Dvina
SA807		Araçá	458	16,732	406	Demini
SA808		Marcapata	458	4,559	130	Inambari
NA809		Yellowstone	457	180,349	1,114	Missouri
EU810		Vishera	457	31,286	415	Kama
NA811		Iskut	457	9,544	248	Stikine
SA812		Sucio	457	5,440	194	Atrato
EU813	Tagus		456	70,756	1,007	Sea of Straw
SA814		Pintoyaçu	456	6,924	319	Nanay
NA815		Richelieu	456	23,718	124	St. Lawrence River
AS816		Dudypta	455	33,100	687	Pyasina
AS817		Rokan-kiri	455	8,821	374	Rokan
SA818		Algodón	454	8,268	750	Putumayo
SA819		Vita	454	8,149	717	Orinoco
AS820		Markha	453	99,000	1,231	Vilyuy
AF821		Luembe	453	46,649	780	Kasai
SA822		San Jorge	453	17,105	368	Magdalena
NA823	Eastmain		452	47,013	756	James Bay
AU824	Normanby		452	24,408	350	Coral Sea
AF825		Wamba	452	35,435	1,017	Kwango
AS826		Bhima	452	70,663	861	Krishna
SA827		Río Salaquí	452	5,830	169	Atrato
AS828	Agano		451	7,710	238	Sea of Japan
EU829	Narva		450	58,147	595	Gulf of Finland
NA830	Penobscot		450	22,408	563	Gulf of Maine
EU831	Dordogne		450	23,957	483	Gironde
SA832		Pisqui	450	5,826	325	Ucayali
EU833	Indalsälven		448	26,727	420	Gulf of Bothnia
AF834		Oso	447	16,589	405	Lowa
SA835		Jufari	447	12,591	322	Rio Negro
EU836		Pinega	445	41,004	779	Northern Dvina
SA837		Bermejo	443	123,162	1,503	Paraguay
EU838		Ufa	443	52,747	918	Belaya
SA839		Cauaburi	443	12,139	447	Rio Negro
AS840	Nakdong		442	23,384	510	Korea Strait
AS841		Nyang	442	17,929	308	Yarlung Tsangpo
NA842	Natashquan		441	16,948	462	Gulf of St. Lawrence
AS843	Serayu		441	4,375	181	Indian Ocean
AU844		Murray above Darling	441	249,850	1,680	Murray
AF845	Save		440	116,100	785	Mozambique Channel	(Note: Save River Basin)
EU846	Ölfusá		440	5,678	210	Atlantic Ocean
AS847		Khantayka	440	30,700	320	Yenisei
AS848		Baulai	440	3,349	177	Surma
AS849		Alaknanda	439	10,882	195	Ganges
SA850		Tapirape	438	21,666	317	Araguaia
EU851	Meuse		437	35,438	950	North Sea
AS852	Mogami		437	6,853	229	Sea of Japan
SA853		Cuiari	437	6,288	338	Içana
SA854		Imabu	437	12,839	228	Trombetas
EU855		Drina	436	19,946	492	Sava	(Note: Source or headwater: Drina (main stem 346 km)–Tara (length 146 km, drainage area 2,006 km², average discharge 64 m³/s);)
SA856		Arapiuns	436	15,432	289	Tapajós
EU857	Umeälven		435	27,547	467	Gulf of Bothnia
NA858	Lempa		435	18,246	422	Pacific Ocean
AS859		Chunya	435	70,500	727	Stony Tunguska
AF860		Tshopo	433	19,248	545	Lindi
AS861		Ogan	433	8,233	344	Musi
SA862		Uarini	433	7,196	233	Solimões
AS863		Sebangfai	432	8,560	190	Mekong
EU864	Kuban		430	58,936	906	Sea of Azov
NA865	Pascagoula		430	24,613	470	Gulf of Mexico
AS866	Tatau		430	5,150	270	South China Sea
AU867	Wapoga		430	5,096	214	Cenderawasih Bay
NA868		Clearwater	430	24,294	293	Snake River
SA869		Cushabatay	430	6,732	230	Ucayali
SA870		Curuá	429	28,099	484	Amazon
EU871	Minho		428	17,619	350	Atlantic Ocean
EU872		Moselle	428	28,286	546	Rhine
EU873	Torneälv		427	40,722	522	Gulf of Bothnia
SA874	Cassiporé		427	6,152	320	Atlantic Ocean
AS875		Little Yenisei	427	58,700	643	Yenisei
EU876		Izhma	427	29,905	531	Pechora
AS877		Wardha	426	48,037	485	Pranahita
AS878		Konda	427	73,176	1,097	Irtysh
AS879	Mae Klong		425	28,779	512	Bay of Bangkok
NA880	St. Johns River		425	22,895	500	Atlantic Ocean
AF881		Didessa	425	28,208	442	Blue Nile
AF882	Kolenté		424	7,832	257	Atlantic Ocean
SA883		Iaco	424	26,574	747	Purus
NA884	Rupert		423	43,253	763	James Bay
AS885	Citarum		423	6,614	297	Java Sea
AF886		Léfini	423	14,951	418	Congo
AS887	Taui		422	25,538	378	Taui Bay
SA888		Manapiare	422	8,132	122	Ventuari
AS889	Ba		421	13,379	388	South China Sea
AF890	Licungo		421	29,691	328	Mozambique Channel
AF891		Lwando	421	27,696	769	Cuanza
OC892	Waikato		420	15,359	425	Tasman Sea
AS893	Subarnarekha		420	19,576	395	Bay of Bengal
AS894	Rioni		420	14,010	327	Black Sea
AS895		Great Zab	419	26,328	494	Tigris
AF896		Mahajilo	419	16,647	326	Tsiribihina
SA897		Chinchipe	419	9,799	137	Marañón
AS898		Nam Lang	419	2,834	106	Nam Hka
AU899	Sebyar		418	6,272	304	Bintuni Bay
SA900		Mayo	418	13,927	346	Huallaga
SA901		Corumbá	417	34,071	568	Paranaíba
AS902	Tapi		416	13,472	230	Bandon Bay
AF903	Mitimele		416	7,433	145	Muni River
AS904		Manipur	416	11,901	338	Myittha
SA905		Cononaco	414	5,434	289	Curaray
AS906		Negara	414	10,758	128	Barito
NA907		Green River	413	23,757	618	Ohio
NA908		Pelly	412	48,174	762	Yukon
AF909		Osse	412	14,099	280	Benin
SA910		Yata	411	20,715	1,060	Mamoré
NA911	Colorado		410	807,573	2,945	Gulf of California	(Note: Average discharge at Lees Ferry, 1922–2025; Source or headwater: Colorado (main stem 1,771 km)–Green River (length 1,174 km, drainage area 115,603 km², average discharge 203 m³/s);)
AS912	Velikaya		409	30,218	556	Gulf of Anadyr
AS913		Xinan	409	11,703	373	Qiantang
AS914		Bahe	409	19,744	253	Qu
SA915	Itajaí-Açu		408	15,049	273	Atlantic Ocean
SA916		Curiuaú	408	11,832	171	Rio Negro
NA917	Altamaha		406	38,167	570	Atlantic Ocean
AS918	Pamapanga		406	9,759	260	Manila Bay
NA919		Thelon above Dubawnt	406	74,158	603	Beverly Lake
SA920		New River	406	16,054	404	Courantyne
AU921		May River	406	3,301	180	Sepik
NA922		La Pasión	405	11,933	377	Usumacinta
NA923		Osage	404	38,964	553	Missouri
AS924		Gâm	404	14,973	297	Lô
SA925		Minerua	404	7,877	294	Juruá
SA926	Cayapas		403	6,321	175	Pacific Ocean
AS927		Mayn	403	32,800	475	Anadyr
SA928		Pira Paraná	403	6,081	285	Apaporis
AS929		Belaya	402	44,700	396	Anadyr
SA930		Sapucaí	402	25,199	343	Rio Grande
AS931	Liao		400	274,560	1,430	Bohai Sea
NA932	Pearl River		400	22,423	790	Mississippi Sound
NA933	Rivière aux Outardes		400	19,057	499	Estuary of St. Lawrence
AS934	Agno		400	7,107	248	Lingayen Gulf
AS935		Popigay	400	50,300	532	Khatanga
AF936		Anambra	400	14,014	256	Niger
AU937		Bigabu	400	4,457	189	Tariku
AS938	Abra		398	5,125	206	South China Sea
AF939	Lúrio		397	61,393	593	Mozambique Channel
AS940		Lematang	396	7,340	348	Musi
SA941		Cesar	396	22,931	280	Magdalena
AS942		Great Kheta	395	20,700	646	Yenisei
AU943	Burdekin		394	130,108	886	Coral Sea
NA944	San Joaquin		394	83,408	589	Suisun Bay
AS945		Khor	394	24,566	453	Ussuri
AS946		Ken	394	28,665	427	Yamuna
AS947	Luoyang		393	16,391	367	Taiwan Strait
AS948	Jelai–Bila		393	6,478	135	Java Sea
NA949	Wawa		392	7,719	221	Caribbean Sea
SA950		Alalaú	392	11,651	346	Jauaperi
AS951	Mahi		391	36,238	583	Gulf of Khambhat
AF952	Imo		392	7,900	335	Bight of Biafra
AS953	Kitakami		391	9,652	249	Pacific Ocean
NA954		Fort Nelson	391	54,477	517	Liard
SA955		Cotuhé	391	6,509	335	Putumayo
NA956	Río Grande de Santiago		390	136,628	1,270	Pacific Ocean
AS957	Periyar		390	6,377	244	Vembanad
EU958	Thjórsá		390	7,578	230	Atlantic Ocean
AS959		Shyok	390	60,983	550	Indus
SA960		Ocamo	390	9,409	258	Orinoco
SA961		Cano San Miguel	388	4,905	166	Guainía
NA962	Povungnituk		387	28,657	402	Hudson Bay
SA963		Suripá	387	14,045	307	Apure
AF964	Mangoro		386	17,175	300	Indian Ocean
NA965	Seal		386	58,361	476	Hudson Bay
EU966		Vaga	386	43,456	575	Northern Dvina
AS967		Tel	386	23,015	296	Mahanadi
AS968	Xinyi–Yi		385	60,218	603	East China Sea
NA969		Monongahela	385	18,992	417	Ohio
AS970		Steung Saen	384	22,034	520	Tonlé Sap
NA971		Nipigon	384	25,645	48	Lake Superior
NA972	Broadback		383	20,849	451	James Bay
AS973		Moei	383	14,978	332	Salween
NA974	Churchill		382	315,986	1,813	Hudson Bay
AF975		Atbarah	382	205,095	986	Nile
SA976		Cubate	382	6,321	321	Içana
AU977	Omba		381	5,360	157	Arafura Sea
SA978		Papunáua	381	6,830	321	Inírida
AU979	Lorentz		380	3,962	277	Arafura Sea
AU980	Musa		380	6,179	140	Solomon Sea
AF981		Bahr el Ghazal	380	851,459	1,201	White Nile	(Note: Bahr el Ghazal River Basin)
AF982		Taraba	380	22,072	329	Benue
SA983		Aro	379	15,090	299	Orinoco
SA984		Aiari	379	5,865	228	Içana
EU985	Neretva		378	11,798	225	Adriatic Sea
OC986	Grey		378	3,932	121	Tasman Sea
NA987		Abitibi	377	29,500	540	Moose
AU988	Daly		376	53,708	682	Timor Sea
NA989	Potomac		376	32,381	652	Chesapeake Bay
AS990	Padas		376	8,774	220	Brunei Bay
OC991	Waitaki		376	11,928	209	Pacific Ocean
AS992		Biryusa	376	55,800	1,012	Taseyeva
AS993		Tinjar	376	4,087	251	Baram
AU994		Karawari	376	7,566	209	Sepik
NA995	Betsiamites		375	18,984	444	Estuary of St. Lawrence
AS996		Abakan	375	32,000	327	Yenisei
AS997		Mu	375	19,485	275	Irrawaddy
SA998		Cunucunuma	375	6,205	241	Orinoco
SA999		Mataurá	375	8,166	203	Madeira
SA1000	Berbice		374	15,920	595	Atlantic Ocean
AS1001		Tarpein	374	7,053	117	Irrawaddy
EU1002	Kalixälv		373	17,158	461	Gulf of Bothnia
AF1003		Faro	373	27,600	425	Benue
AF1004		Kafue	372	155,805	1,576	Zambezi
AS1005		Turukhan	371	35,800	639	Yenisei
AF1006	Orange		370	1,020,000	2,432	Atlantic Ocean
AF1007	Mano		370	7,634	320	Atlantic Ocean
SA1008		Madidi	370	12,651	390	Beni
NA1009	Savannah		369	28,265	484	Atlantic Ocean
AF1010	Queve		369	22,908	592	Atlantic Ocean
SA1011		Madeirinha	369	11,185	314	Roosevelt
AS1012		Thazalol	369	2,922	95	Mali
AS1013		Mun above Chi	368	53,397	673	Mun
AS1014		Bé	368	7,518	350	Ðông Nai
AF1015		Bemarivo	368	9,932	264	Anjobony
SA1016		Mecaya	366	4,595	210	Caquetá
AS1017		Huangpu	366	26,251	114	Yangtze
AS1018		Boh	365	6,624	168	Mahakam
NA1019		Gatineau	364	23,724	443	Ottawa
AS1020		Noa Dihing	364	3,301	200	Lohit
NA1021		White River	363	29,115	583	Wabash
NA1022	Dulce–Polochic		362	8,758	282	Amatique Bay
SA1023		Los Amigos	362	4,466	365	Madre de Dios
AS1024	Talovka		361	34,498	378	Penzhina Bay
NA1025	Tonalá		361	5,679	300	Caribbean Sea
EU1026	Adour		360	16,912	309	Bay of Biscay
NA1027	Rio Grande de Térraba		360	4,658	174	Pacific Ocean
AS1028	Mayu		360	5,115	155	Bay of Bengal
EU1029		Desna	360	88,490	1,187	Dnieper
AF1030		Luwegu	360	25,444	376	Rufiji
AS1031		Dikhow	359	4,022	236	Brahmaputra
SA1032		Saposoa	359	7,126	150	Huallaga
SA1033		Lucie	358	10,051	234	Courantyne
NA1034	Coppename		357	52,398	845	Coronation Gulf
SA1035	Guapi		357	2,630	132	Pacific Ocean
AS1036	Netravati		357	4,384	106	Arabian Sea
AF1037	Gambia		355	77,054	1,180	Atlantic Ocean
NA1038	Roanoke		355	26,801	660	Albemarle Sound
SA1039		Ipixuna	355	19,133	596	Purus
AF1040		Ikopa	355	12,798	382	Betsiboka
SA1041		Carrao	355	6,824	272	Caroní
AS1042		Tutoh	355	3,972	227	Baram
SA1043		Conambo	355	3,686	215	Tigre
SA1044		Sucuriú	354	25,220	450	Paraná
AS1045		Mama	354	18,900	406	Vitim
NA1046		Tana	354	2,500	105	Chitina
EU1047	Dalälven		353	28,954	541	Gulf of Bothnia
NA1048	Kanairiktok		352	12,274	322	Labrador Sea
NA1049		Nechako	352	46,943	516	Fraser
AF1050		Lua	352	25,237	483	Ubangi
AF1051		Lugulu	352	10,929	483	Ulindi
AS1052		Seti Gandaki	352	7,396	202	Ghaghara
AS1053		Kumey	352	3,817	148	Kamla
AS1054		Bheri	351	13,846	264	Ghaghara
EU1055	Ural		350	339,084	2,582	Caspian Sea
EU1056	Terek		350	43,700	623	Caspian Sea
AS1057	Kiso		350	5,419	227	Pacific Ocean
EU1058		Ticino	350	8,061	280	Po
AF1059	Limpopo		349	421,123	1,750	Indian Ocean	(Note: Average discharge at Chibuto, 1971–2000; Limpopo River Basin)
EU1060	Tuloma		349	29,586	359	Kola Bay
AU1061		Wawoi	349	4,312	482	Bamu
AS1062		Qingyi	349	12,933	290	Dadu
AS1063		Yong Tsangpo	349	13,533	286	Parlung Tsangpo
AS1064		Great Patom	348	28,400	570	Lena
AS1065		Nam Hka	348	10,308	278	Salween
EU1066	Kem		347	30,254	385	White Sea
NA1067	Naskaupi		347	12,691	271	Lake Melville
AF1068		Mpoko	347	26,334	368	Ubangi
NA1069		Salmon	346	36,186	684	Snake River
AF1070		Ouaka	346	40,460	598	Ubangi
AS1071		Bailong	346	32,972	576	Jialing
AS1072	Tokachi		345	6,804	156	Pacific Ocean
AS1073		Vahsyugan	345	61,800	1,082	Ob
AS1074		Lyapin	345	27,300	404	Northern Sosva
AS1075		Qu	345	11,468	258	Qiantang
AF1076		Lekoni	344	7,593	252	Ogooué
AS1077		Nyukzha	343	32,100	583	Olyokma
AS1078		Agapa	343	26,000	396	Pyasina
AU1079		Sobger	343	3,552	189	Taritatu
AS1080		Yudoma	342	43,700	765	Maya
AF1081		Mambéré	342	28,018	520	Sangha
NA1082		West Branch Susquehanna	342	18,035	391	Susquehanna
NA1083	Rogue		341	13,342	346	Pacific Ocean
AS1084		Vivi	341	26,800	426	Lower Tunguska
SA1085		Crixás Açu	341	23,196	420	Araguaia
EU1086	Oulujoki		340	30,555	107	Gulf of Bothnia
AS1087		Bakhta	340	35,500	498	Yenisei
SA1088		Pelotas	340	13,378	437	Uruguay
AS1089		Kulsi	340	4,615	220	Brahmaputra
SA1090		Rio Branco	340	5,358	126	Ituí
NA1091	Romaine		339	14,349	451	Gulf of St. Lawrence
AS1092	Teshio		339	5,590	256	Sea of Japan
SA1093		Coca	339	5,308	245	Napo
AS1094	Amguema		338	29,600	498	Chukchi Sea
SA1095		Quixito	338	5,564	204	Itaquai
EU1096	Dniester		337	73,158	1,362	Dniester Estuary
AS1097	Messoyakha		337	24,435	466	Taz Estuary
AS1098		Lian	337	10,131	275	Bei
SA1099		Namangoza	337	11,119	200	Santiago
NA1100		Innoko	336	36,517	805	Yukon
SA1101		Corriente	336	26,873	500	Paraná
AF1102		Louessé	336	16,119	325	Kouilou
SA1103		Cenepa	336	6,825	206	Marañón
AS1104	Limbang		335	3,920	275	South China Sea
AS1105		Lhasa	335	32,471	568	Yarlung Tsangpo
AS1106		Chishui	335	18,873	523	Yangtze
NA1107		Fond du Lac	335	51,467	313	Lake Athabasca
SA1108		Rio dos Bois	334	34,759	528	Paranaíba
AS1109		Arga-Sala	334	47,700	503	Olenyok
NA1110		Stony	334	16,513	310	Kuskokwim
AS1111		Rawas	334	5,841	208	Musi
AS1112		Drung	334	9,913	179	Mali
EU1113	Vyg		333	31,352	237	Onega Bay
SA1114		Carabinani	333	7,196	401	Jaú
EU1115		Isère	333	11,890	286	Rhône
NA1116	Sudden Stream		332	3,019	138	Yakutat Bay
AU1117	Siriwo		331	4,013	151	Cenderawasih Bay
AS1118		Kan	331	36,900	629	Yenisei
NA1119		Teslin	331	35,014	393	Yukon
SA1120		Pacaás Novos	331	16,985	344	Mamoré
AS1121		Zanskar	331	14,874	134	Indus
AS1122		Kayaniat	331	4,103	126	Kayan
NA1123		Green River	330	23,757	618	Ohio
SA1124		São Lourenço	330	55,103	559	Cuiabá
SA1125		Bobonaza	330	3,375	405	Pastaza
AS1126		Merangin	330	5,278	162	Tembesi
NA1127		Sarapiquí	330	3,093	103	San Juan del Norte
SA1128	Barima		329	9,205	470	Atlantic Ocean
AF1129	Mbridge		329	19,510	401	Atlantic Ocean
AU1130	Vailala		329	5,679	224	Gulf of Papua
AS1131		Wei	329	135,139	818	Yellow River	(Note: Average discharge at near mouth, 1971–2000; Wei River Basin)
AF1132		Inzia	329	25,899	669	Kwilu
SA1133		Catrimani	329	12,671	591	Rio Branco
AS1134		Yasachnaya	329	35,900	441	Kolyma
AF1135	Jubba–Shebelle		328	816,054	2,663	Indian Ocean	(Note: Average discharge at near mouth, 1971–2000; Source or headwater: Jubba (lower Jubba main stem 137 km)–Shebelle (length 2,526 km, drainage area 336,627 km², average discharge 75 m³/s); Jubba–Shabelle Basin)
AU1136	Uta		328	4,170	147	Arafura Sea
NA1137	Umpqua		327	12,103	364	Pacific Ocean
SA1138		Tamboryaçu	327	4,958	446	Napo
SA1139		Quaraí	327	14,641	351	Uruguay
AU1140		Wildeman	327	3,412	330	Eilanden
AS1141		Tura	326	80,400	1,030	Tobol
EU1142	Drammenselva		325	17,054	308	Drammensfjorden
AS1143	Ci Tanduy		325	3,704	178	Indian Ocean
AF1144	Rianila		325	7,645	134	Indian Ocean
SA1145		Mamuru	325	10,048	393	Paraná do Ramos
SA1146		Piuini	325	6,099	446	Unini
SA1147		Das Velhas	324	27,928	774	São Francisco
AF1148		Baro	324	41,400	581	Sobat
AF1149		Lobaye	324	31,449	631	Ubangi
AS1150		Xiao	324	12,133	365	Xiang
AS1151		Tebo	324	5,083	260	Batang Hari
SA1152		Malinowski	324	3,378	128	Tambopata
AU1153	Kumbe		322	4,997	300	Arafura Sea
AS1154	Sefid-Rud		321	59,307	670	Caspian Sea
SA1155		Pau d'Arco	321	13,505	219	Araguaia
AS1156		Vàm Cỏ	321	15,628	358	Đồng Nai
AS1157		Ketungau	321	5,496	186	Kapuas
AS1158	Alazeya		320	85,493	1,590	East Siberian Sea
AF1159	Ogun		320	22,166	480	Bight of Benin
AS1160	Taedong		320	20,247	439	West Korea Bay
AU1161	Maro		320	4,955	384	Arafura Sea
SA1162		Tiputini	320	4,423	434	Napo
NA1163		Missinaibi	320	23,500	426	Moose
SA1164	Sinnamary		319	6,565	290	Atlantic Ocean
AF1165		Maiko	319	13,936	516	Lualaba
SA1166		Ireng	319	11,538	405	Takutu
AS1167		Baitarani	319	11,943	360	Brahmani
SA1166		Itanhauã	319	9,187	335	Lago Coari
SA1167		Upía	319	8,800	107	Meta
SA1168		Saldaña	318	9,963	201	Magdalena
NA1169	Eel		317	9,540	315	Pacific Ocean
AU1170	Derewo		317	4,334	304	Cenderawasih Bay
AF1171		Jubba above Shebelle	316	214,441	1,671	Jubba	(Note: Average discharge, 1971–2000; Source or headwater: Jubba (main stem 813 km)–Ganale Doria (length 858 km. drainage area 82,600 km², average discharge 242 m³/s);)
AF1172	Buzi		315	28,580	374	Mozambique Channel
AS1173		Jiaomuzu	315	23,201	124	Dadu
SA1174		Igarapé Turi	315	5,514	104	Marié
SA1175	Uaçá		313	5,223	197	Atlantic Ocean
AF1176	Fatala		312	6,092	205	Atlantic Ocean
AS1177	Ulhas		312	4,637	122	Arabian Sea
SA1178		Surumu	312	12,732	254	Takutu
SA1179		Urubaxi	312	6,856	250	Rio Negro
EU1180	Maritsa		311	54,206	468	Thracian Sea
NA1181	Motagua		311	16,330	464	Gulf of Honduras
AS1182	Mesuji		311	6,529	464	Java Sea
AS1183		Great Yugan	311	34,700	1,063	Ob
SA1184		Juami	310	7,010	369	Japurá
SA1185		Pinquina	310	2,030	140	Manu
SA1186		Maracapata	310	4,600	130	Manu
SA1187		Paraná do Mamori	309	8,724	347	Autaz-Açu
AF1188	Okavango		308	785,000	2,090	Kalahari Desert, Lake Makgadikgadi	(Note: Average discharge at Dirico, 1971–2000; The drainage basin of the Okavango River is endorheic (endorheic basin). It flows into the Kalahari Desert basin, creating a vast inland delta covering 15,000 square kilometers. Almost all of the water evaporates or seeps away within the delta; extreme seasonal floods are the only exception to this. During these periods, a small portion of the water volume can spill over into the Boteti, as well as into the Magwegquana River, which is a dry, ancient riverbed. The Boteti ends in a salt pan within the Makgadikgadi Pan basin and does not reach the open sea. The Magwegquana, however, connects with the Chobe River, a tributary of the Zambezi; thus, during exceptional floods, a fraction of the Okavango's water eventually reaches the ocean. Okavango River Basin The Magwegquana (also known as the Selinda Spillway) is a natural waterway in Botswana that connects the Okavango Delta with the Linyanti Swamps (and the Chobe–Cuando river system). It is a rare and unique hydrodynamic phenomenon that can flow in two different directions depending on rainfall levels, or dry up completely in certain years. It is located within the private game reserve known as the Selinda Reserve (NG16), which is famous for its rich wildlife and safari camps. Makgadikgadi Lake Basin)
EU1189	Kymijoki		307	37,107	570	Gulf of Finland
AU1190		Keram	307	5,599	335	Sepik
AU1191	Menggan		306	4750	201	Arafura Sea
AF1192		Sankarani	306	33,288	679	Niger
SA1193		Urucu	306	8,810	286	Lago Coari
AS1194		Sym	305	31,600	694	Yenisei
AS1195		Sekayam	305	5,163	221	Kapuas
AS1196		Ranganadi	305	2,482	150	Subansiri
NA1197	Trinity		304	47,549	1,140	Galveston Bay
SA1198	Calçoene		304	3,594	160	Atlantic Ocean
AS1199		Tsipa	304	42,200	692	Yenisei
AS1200		Ramganga	304	30,641	596	Ganges
SA1201		Chapare	304	8,145	333	Ichilo
SA1202		Uruará	304	13,143	286	Curuá Una
AS1203		Jaldhaka	304	5,929	233	Brahmaputra
NA1204	James		303	23,528	715	Chesapeake Bay
NA1205	Exploits		303	11,319	246	Bay of Exploits
SA1206		Nichare	303	4,310	164	Caura
NA1207	Suwannee		301	26,401	426	Gulf of Mexico
AS1208		He	301	11,599	338	Xi
SA1209		Zulia	301	8,993	261	Catatumbo
AU1210		Van der Wal	301	6,100	230	Taritatu
AS1211	Seputih		300	7,072	249	Java Sea
EU1212	Namsen		300	6,298	228	Namsenfjorden
EU1213		Siret	300	45,857	706	Danube
SA1214		Verde	300	13,456	404	Teles Pires
AS1215		Shaxi	300	11,856	328	Min
AS1216		Kedang Pahu	300	6,800	144	Mahakam

== See also ==
- List of rivers by length
- List of drainage basins by area
- List of rivers

== Bibliography ==
- Czaya, Eberhard. Rivers of the World. Cambridge University Press, 1983. ISBN 978-0521258357.
- Balázs, Dénes. Amazónia. Gondolat Könyvkiadó, 1987. ISBN 963-281-785-0.
- Gary J. Brierley & Kristie A. Fryirs. Geomorphology and River Management. Wiley-Blackwell, 2005. ISBN 1-4051-1516-5.
- Fred Pearce. When the Rivers Run Dry. Beacon Press, 2007. ISBN 978-0807085738.
- Tim, Davle. Fundamentals of Hydrology. Routledge, 2008. ISBN 978-0415399869.
- Samuel Baker. The Albert N'yanza, Great Basin of the Nile, and Explorations of the Nile Sources. Cambridge University Press, 2011. ISBN 978-1-108-03204-9.
- Vijay P. Singh. Handbook of Applied Hydrology, Second Edition. McGraw Hill, 2016. ISBN 978-0071835107.
- Laurence, C. Smith. Rivers of Power. Pingvin, 2021. ISBN 978-0141987231.
- Wilfried H. Brutsaert. Hydrology: An Introduction. Cambridge University Press, 2023. ISBN 978-1009301879.
- Bloesch, Jürg. The Danube River and The Western Black Sea Coast: Complex Transboundary Management. Elsevier, 2025. ISBN 978-0128227657.
- Earthscan Series on Major River Basins of the World. Routledge.
