= Northern New Guinea lowland rain and freshwater swamp forests =

Ecoregion in New Guinea

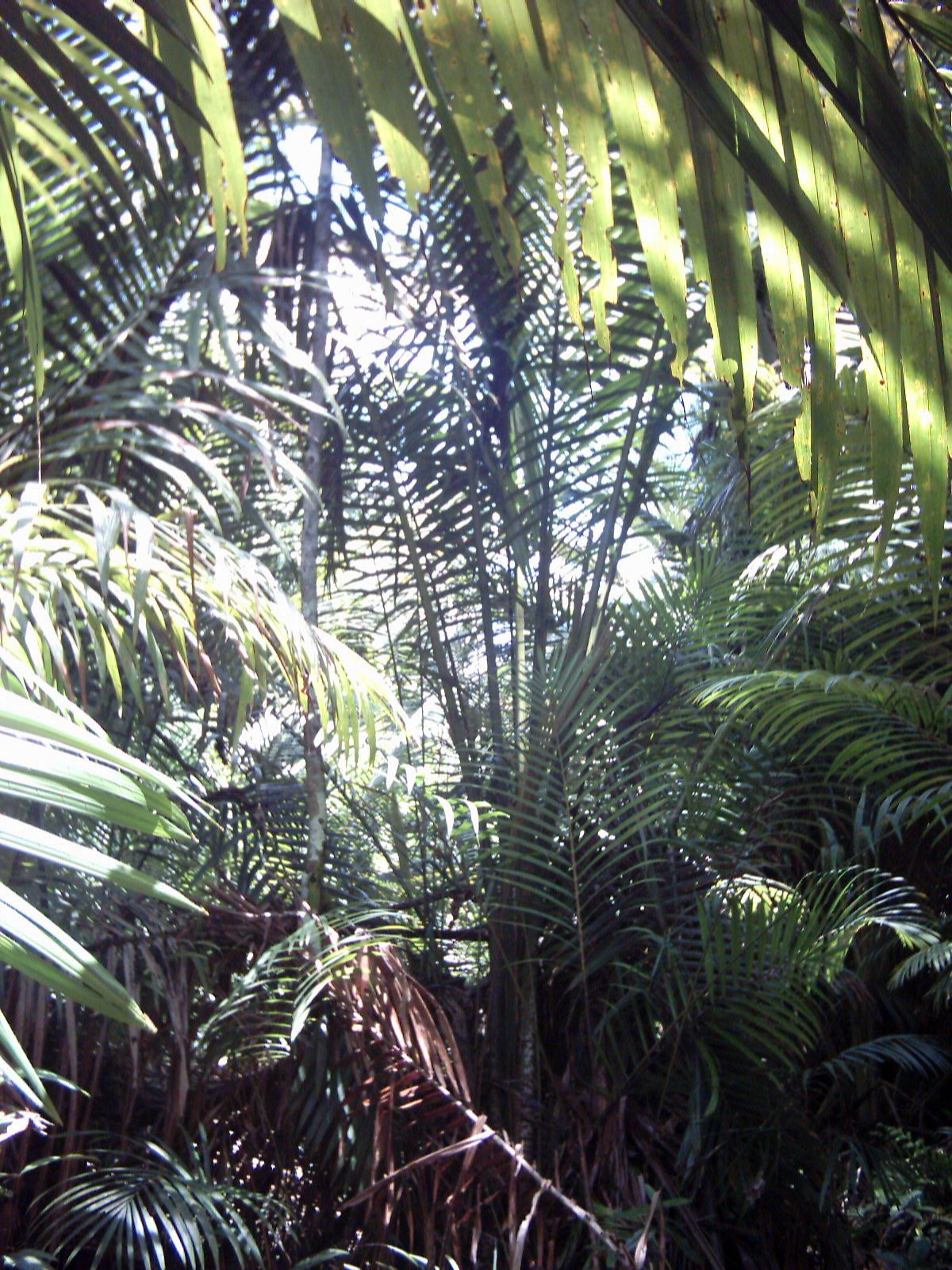
- Sago palms (Metroxylon sagu) in East Sepik Province, Papua New Guinea

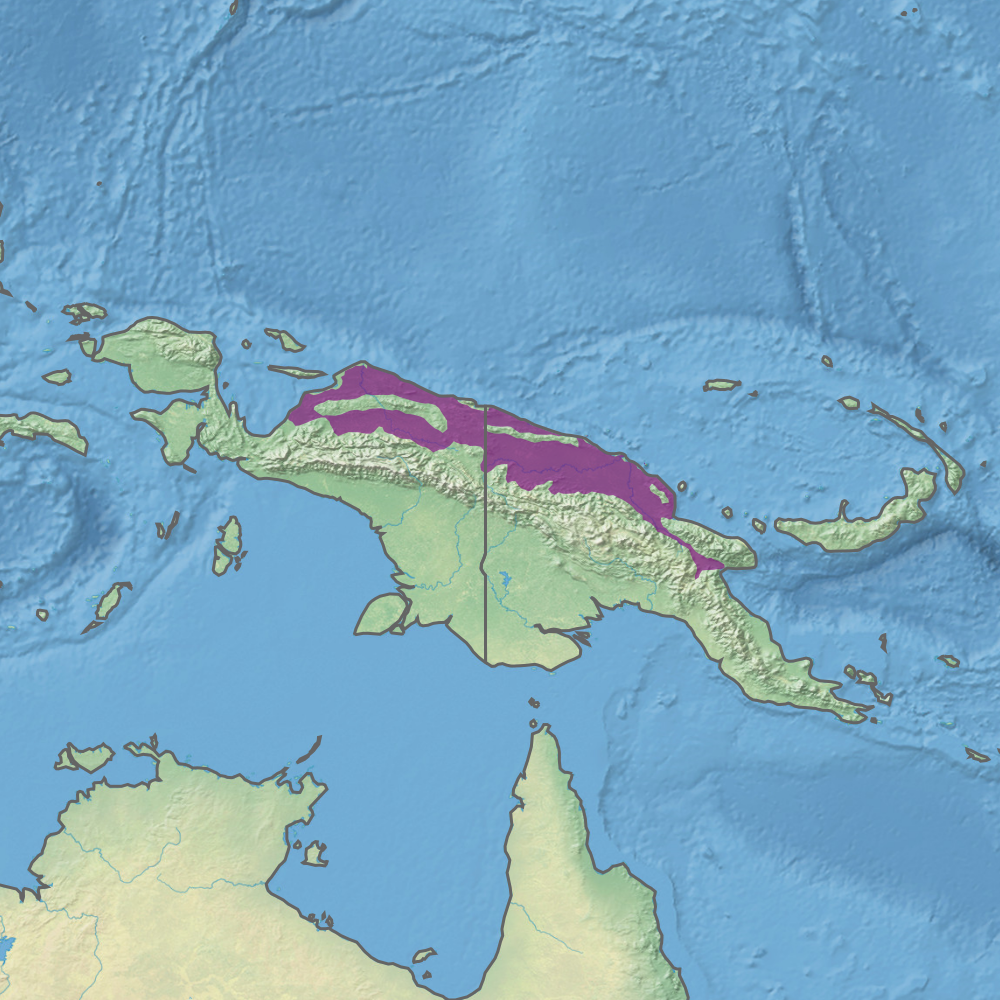
- Ecoregion territory (in purple)

Ecology
- Realm: Australasian realm
- Biome: tropical and subtropical moist broadleaf forests
- Borders: List: Central Range montane rain forests; Huon Peninsula montane rain forests; New Guinea mangroves; Southeastern Papuan rain forests; Vogelkop-Aru lowland rain forests

Geography
- Area: 134,543 km^{2} (51,947 mi^{2})
- Countries: Indonesia; Papua New Guinea
- Provinces: Central Papua; Papua (Indonesia); East Sepik; Madang; Morobe, Sandaun (Papua New Guinea)
- Coordinates: 3.92°S 142.32°E

Conservation
- Conservation status: Relatively stable/intact
- Protected: 15,323 km^{2} (11%)

The Northern New Guinea lowland rain and freshwater swamp forests is a tropical moist broadleaf forest ecoregion of northern New Guinea.

== Setting ==
The Northern New Guinea lowland rain and freshwater swamp forests extend across the northern lowlands of the island of New Guinea, lying between the New Guinea Central Range to the south and the Pacific Ocean to the north. It extends from the eastern shore of Cenderawasih Bay in Indonesia's Papua Province east to Morobe Province of Papua New Guinea.

Several east-west mountain ranges, including the Van Rees Mountains, Foja Mountains, Torricelli Mountains, and Finisterre Mountains, rise from the lowlands; these ranges are home to the distinct Northern New Guinea montane rain forests ecoregion.

The ecoregion is drained by several of New Guinea's large rivers, including the Mamberamo, Sepik, and Ramu, and Markham.

== Flora ==
The plant communities of the ecoregion are diverse. Lowland evergreen rain forest is the most extensive, and includes alluvial forests in the plains, and hill forests in the foothills of the adjacent mountains.

There are extensive freshwater swamp forests in the coastal lowlands and in the Lakes Plains region between the Van Rees-Foja mountains and the Central Range. The swamp forest habitats are diverse, and include grass swamps, swamp savannas, and swamp woodlands and forests dominated by Melaleuca, sago palm (Metroxylon sagu), Pandanus, Campnosperma, and/or Terminalia.

== Fauna ==
The ecoregion corresponds to the Northern Papuan lowlands Endemic Bird Area. Limited-range and endemic species include the red-breasted paradise kingfisher (Tanysiptera nympha), brown lory (Chalcopsitta duivenbodei), Edwards's fig parrot (Psittaculirostris edwardsii), Salvadori's fig parrot (Psittaculirostris salvadorii), Brass's friarbird (Philemon brassi), white-bellied whistler (Pachycephala leucogastra), brown-headed crow (Corvus fuscicapillus), pale-billed sicklebill (Drepanornis bruijnii), and banded yellow robin (Gennaeodryas placens).

== Conservation and threats ==
A 2017 assessment found that 15,323 km^{2}, or 11%, of the ecoregion is in protected areas. The largest is Mamberamo Foja Wildlife Reserve, which extends along the Mamberamo River and its tributaries the Tariku and Taritatu from the foothills of the Central Range to the sea, including the Foja Mountains.
