= Mamberamo Foja National Park =

National park in Indonesia

- IUCN category II (national park)
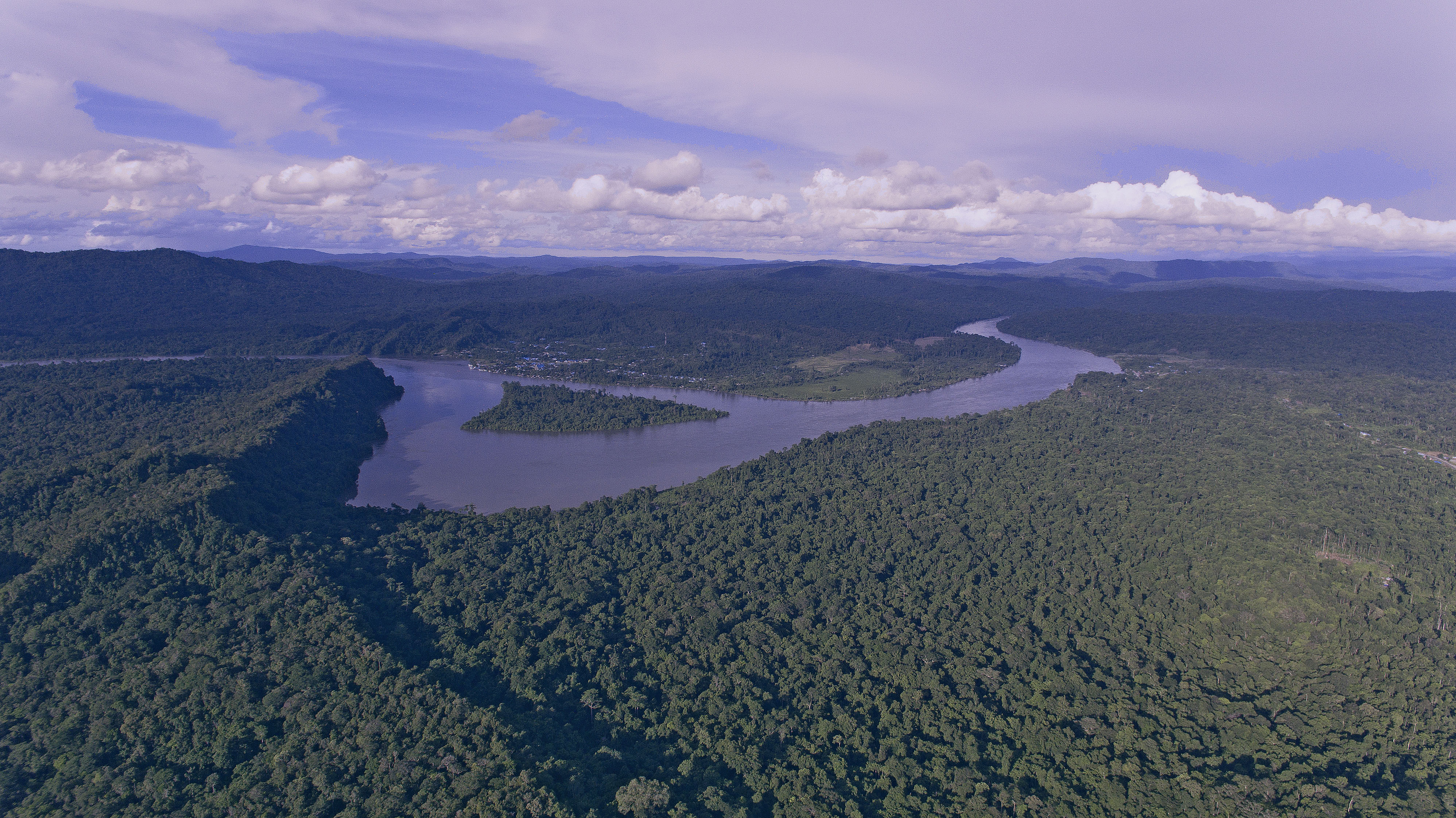
- Mamberamo River near Kasonaweja

- Location within Papua (province)
- Location: Papua, Indonesia
- Nearest city: Burmeso
- Coordinates: 1°46′S 137°50′E
- Area: 16,610 km^{2} (6,410 sq mi)
- Established: 2024
- Governing body: Ministry of Forestry

Mamberamo Foja National Park is one of the national parks of Indonesia, located in Papua Province. It covers an area of 16,610 km^{2} (6,410 sq mi), and extends along the Mamberamo River and its tributaries from the foothills of the Central Range to the Pacific Ocean.

== Geography ==
The southern part of the reserve is in the Lakes Plains region, a landscape of freshwater swamp forests and lowland rain forests south of the Central Range. The eastward-flowing Tariku River and westward-flowing Taritatu River meander through the region forming oxbow lakes and wetlands, and join to form the northward-flowing Mamberamo.

The reserve follows the eastern bank of the Mamberamo and includes the Foja Mountains, which reach an elevation of 2193 meters. The Foja Mountains are covered in montane rain forests above 1000 meters elevation.

The lower reach of the Mamberamo includes Rombebai Lake, New Guinea's largest. The river delta includes freshwater swamp forests and coastal mangroves.

== Ecology ==
The reserve encompasses diverse plant communities, including montane rain forests, lowland and hill rain forests, freshwater swamp forests, flooded grasslands and savannas, and mangroves. The majority of the reserve is in the Northern New Guinea lowland rain and freshwater swamp forests ecoregion, while the portions of the Foja range above 1000 meters elevation are in the Northern New Guinea montane rain forests ecoregion.

== History of the reserve ==
The reserve was gazetted by the Indonesian government in the 1980s, and later expanded to include the Foja Mountains. For decades conservation NGOs have proposed that the reserve become a national park.

At a two-day seminar on 7 and 8 November 2014 organized by the Yayasan Lingkungan Hidup, a local NGO, villagers requested that the government convert the wildlife sanctuary to a national park.
