= Lakes Plains =

- Meervlakte
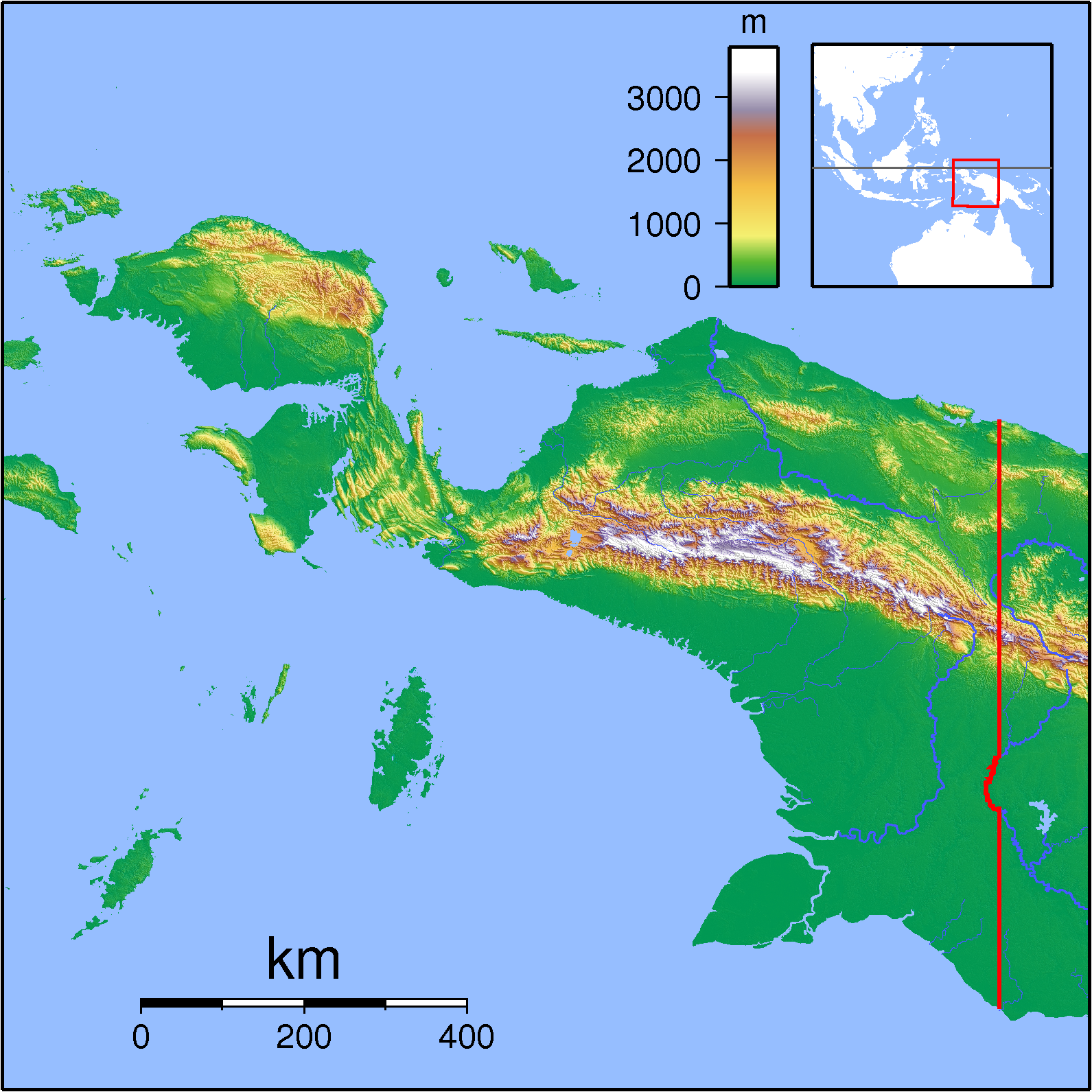
- Topography of Western New Guinea

- Location within Western New Guinea Location within Indonesia

Geography
- Country: Indonesia
- State: Papua
- Region: Western New Guinea
- Coordinates: 2°55′30″S 138°26′30″E
- Interactive map of Lakes Plains

The Mamberamo Lakes Plains (Dutch Meervlakte, Malay dataran danau-danau) are a large, flat low-lying area of the Mamberamo River basin in the Indonesian province Papua on the island of New Guinea. The plain is defined by the meandering tributaries of the Mamberamo, and includes hundreds of oxbow lakes. It is 300 kilometers long and about 50 kilometers wide, and is entirely enclosed by mountains apart from the outlet of the Mameramo. It is inhabited in the west, but the eastern lobe is largely uninhabited.

== Biology ==
Biologically, the plains are covered by tropical lowland jungle. Much of that is Adina and Barringtonia spicata (see Barringtonia) swamp forest, large areas of sago palm, and marsh vegetation with Echinochloa stagnina. During the rainy season, large parts of the remaining forest is flooded for months at a time. These areas are populated with Timonius, Dillenia or Nauclea.

== Hydrology ==
South of the Lakes Plains lies the Central Dividing Range, the highest part of the western New Guinea Highlands, which drains into the basin. The basin is bisected by two major rivers, the Tariku, which originates in the Jayawijaya Mountains to the west and flows eastwards, and the Taritatu, which rises in the east, not far from the PNG border, and flows westwards. The major tributary of the Taritatu to the south, the Sobger River, originating in the Maoke Mountains, while to the north the Songgolo and Pauwasi Rivers join to form its other major tributary. In the middle of the Lakes Plains, the two rivers meet and merge to form the Mamberamo, one of the largest rivers of New Guinea. The Mamberamo flows out through a gorge between the Van Rees Mountains to its west and the Foja Mountains to its east.

== See also ==
- Lakes Plains languages
