= Mamberamo River =

River in Indonesia

Mamberamo
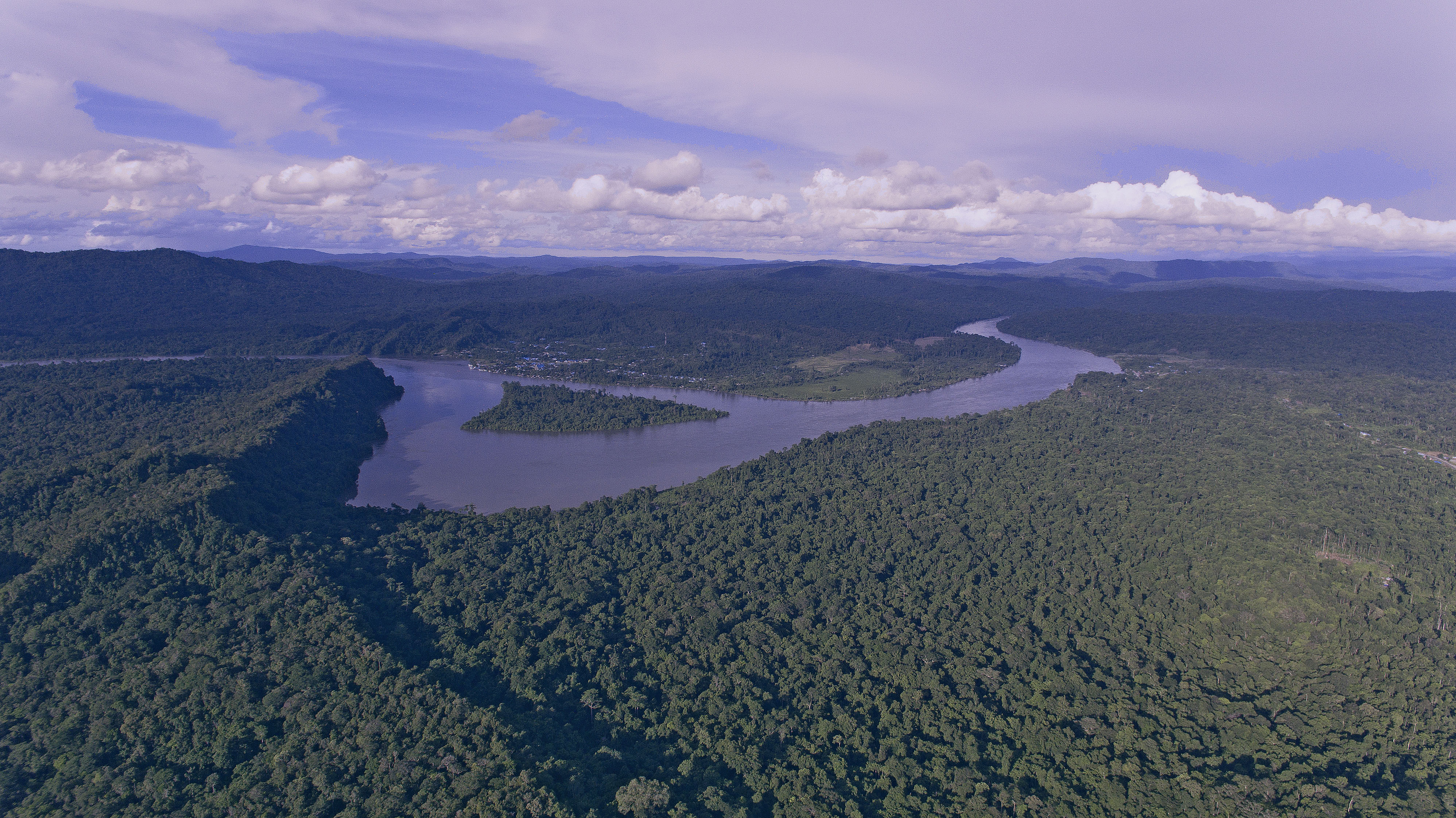
- Mamberamo River, aerial view in 2017.

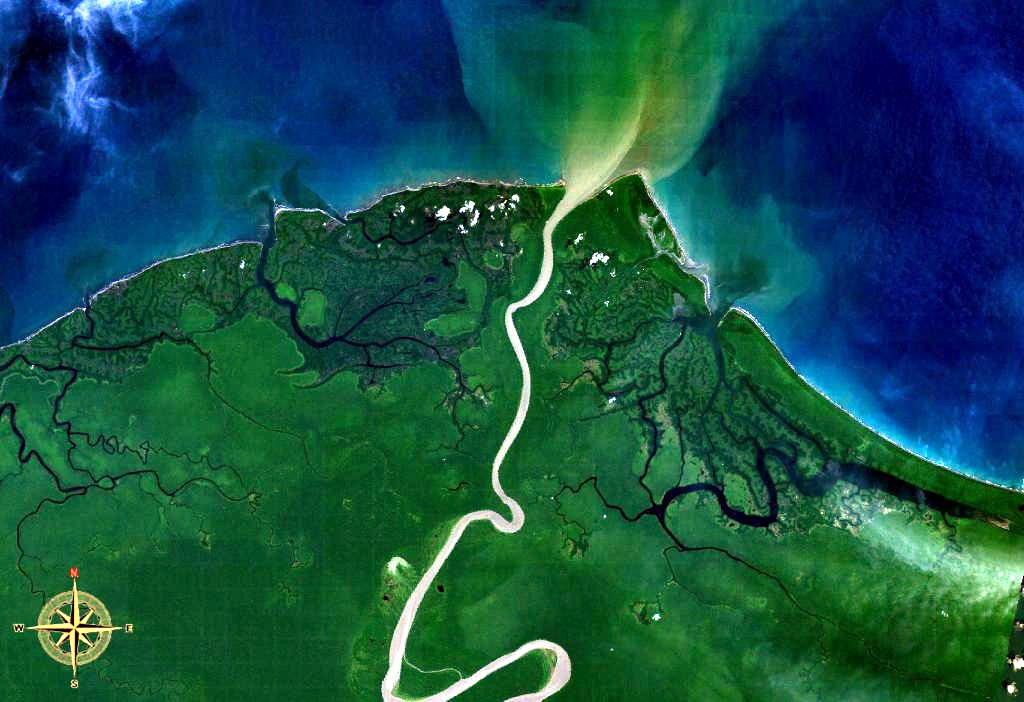
- Mamberamo, entering the sea, seen from space.

Location
- Country: Indonesia
- Region: Papua

Physical characteristics
- Source: confluence of Tariku and Taritatu
  - coordinates: 2°55′30″S 138°26′30″E
- Mouth: Pacific Ocean
  - location: Teba, Indonesia
  - coordinates: 1°28′S 137°54′E
  - elevation: 0 m (0 ft)
- Length: 283 km (176 mi) (Mamberamo–Taritatu–Waruta 1,112 km (691 mi))
- Basin size: 78,992 km^{2} (30,499 mi^{2})
- Depth
  - minimum: 3 m (9.8 ft)
  - average: 8–14 m (26–46 ft)
  - maximum: 33 m (108 ft)
- Discharge
  - location: Mamberamo Delta
  - average: 5,500 m^{3}/s (190,000 cu ft/s)

Basin features
- Progression: Pacific Ocean
- River system: Mamberamo River
- Tributaries
  - left: Tariku
  - right: Taritatu

The Mamberamo (Indonesian: Sungai Mamberamo) is the second-longest river on the island of New Guinea, after Sepik River (1,126 km) and the second largest in Oceania by discharge volume after Fly. It is located in the Indonesian province of Papua. It is the second largest river in Indonesia by volume of discharge after Kapuas and also the widest.

The river is formed from the confluence of its upper tributaries, the Tariku and Taritatu Rivers in the Lakes Plains region, an interior basin with extensive freshwater swamp forests and grasslands. It flows northwards between the Van Rees Range (Pegunungan Van Rees) and Foja Mountains through a series of rapids and gorges. The last 160 km of the river are navigable. In the coastal lowlands, the river is lined with marshes and forms a broad river delta. The Mamberamo discharges into the Pacific Ocean at the northern point of Point D'Urville or Cape Narwaku (Tanjung Narwaku).

The river's huge valley is home to various uncontacted peoples and incredible biodiversity. In the 1990s, the Indonesian Government had plans to construct a large hydroelectric dam on the Mamberamo that would have submerged much of the area. This plan was shelved after the Indonesian financial crisis from 1998 to 1999, but there are concerns by environmental groups that it could be resurrected sometime in the future. At present, the Mamberamo remains the second largest river in the world to be completely unfragmented by dams in its catchment, behind only the relatively nearby Fly.

The Mamberamo area also broadly refers to several nearby mountain ranges, including the Van Rees and Foja Mountains (also known as Foya), which were the subject of a recent rapid biological assessment conducted by Conservation International, the Indonesian Institute of Sciences, and Cenderawasih University. The scientific team discovered the first new bird species from New Guinea in 60 years, and a wealth of other new plants and animals. The Foya Mountains appear to be a globally outstanding repository of biodiversity.

== Hydrology ==
Its length from the confluence of the Tariku and Taritatu is 283 km (176 mi). From the source of the Waruta, it covers a total distance of 1,112 km (691 mi). It has a catchment area of 79,000 km^{2} (31,000 mi^{2}) with an annual rainfall of 3,578 mm (Köppen climate classification classifies this area as type Af). Average width is 175–800 m (574–2,625 ft), depth 8 m (26 ft) (maximum 33 m).

== Tributaries ==
The main tributaries from the mouth:

Left tributary	Right tributary	Length (km)	Basin size (km^{2})	Average discharge (m^{3}/s)
Mamberamo		1,112	78,992	5,500
Tariku (Rouffaer)		488	24,664.2	2,086.1
	Taritatu (Idenburg)	808	47,803.2	2,965.2
Tariku main tributaries
	Van Daalen	140	3,384.3	292.1
Bigabu		150	4,457.3	438.3
Taritatu main tributaries
Dundu		170	3,282.4	254.1
Van der Wal		230	6,099.9	330.5
Sobgair (Air)		180	7,195.9	707.6
Sobger		188.9	3,551.7	376.6
Songgat		131.2	4,365.6	237.1
	Waruta	179.2	4,295.9	122.6

== Discharge ==
Average monthly flow (Q) at delta in 2003–2012: 5,014 m^{3}/s (158.23 km^{3}/year)

Month	Q
JAN	6,006 m^{3}/s (212,100 cu ft/s)
FEB	7,749 m^{3}/s (273,700 cu ft/s)
MAR	6,749 m^{3}/s (238,300 cu ft/s)
APR	5,276 m^{3}/s (186,300 cu ft/s)
MAY	4,374 m^{3}/s (154,500 cu ft/s)
JUN	4,629 m^{3}/s (163,500 cu ft/s)
JUL	3,417 m^{3}/s (120,700 cu ft/s)
AUG	4,157 m^{3}/s (146,800 cu ft/s)
SEP	3,515 m^{3}/s (124,100 cu ft/s)
OCT	4,709 m^{3}/s (166,300 cu ft/s)
NOV	3,691 m^{3}/s (130,300 cu ft/s)
DEC	5,896 m^{3}/s (208,200 cu ft/s)

Mamberamo River average discharge:

Period	Discharge	Ref.
Mamberamo Delta 1°28′S 137°54′E
2012–2018	163.26346 km^{3}/a (5,173.507 m^{3}/s)	
2003–2012	158.23 km^{3}/a (5,014 m^{3}/s)	
	5,922.9 m^{3}/s (209,170 cu ft/s)	
	5,500 m^{3}/s (190,000 cu ft/s)	
Mamberamo II Hydro Power Plant 2°8′39.6096″S 137°51′36.9756″E
1962–1987	4,532 m^{3}/s (160,000 cu ft/s)	

== Geology ==
The region is geologically young (middle to late Miocene, i.e. less than 15 million years old) and remains tectonically active, with frequent earthquakes and landslides in the steepest areas. The mountain basin called "Mamberamo" is composed mostly of high floodplains, extensive swamps, forested wetlands, meandering rivers and backwater lakes. The sediment-rich rivers in the catchment belong to 'white-water' systems similar to the Amazonian moors. Three soil orders are present, of which the inceptisols are the most widespread, followed by ultisols and entisols. All soils are fine textured with poor drainage. The diversity of the region is a result of its geological history, which gives rise to a diversity of habitats. Riparian forests within the Mamberamo Basin are heavily influenced by dynamic river meanders that continually modify the landscape, with some banks eroding rapidly while others grow as new sediments accumulate.

== Ecology and vegetation ==
The Mamberamo Basin is one of the most important biodiversity hotspots in New Guinea. Both Asian and Australo-Pacific elements are present in terms of botanical affinities. One survey at the foothills of the Foja Mountains identified 487 putative plant species, 156 of which are not assigned to known taxa, indicating a high proportion of undescribed species. The floodplain forests of the basin include swamp forests, seasonally flooded lakeside forests and sago forests.

Seven general vegetation categories are distinguished in the landscape: primeval forest (old-growth dryland forest), swamp forest (natural wetlands dominated by trees), lakeside forest (seasonally flooded forest), sago forest (a form of swamp) dominated by sago palm, secondary forest, mixed forest and sago woodland. Two other types are also recognised: montane forest and damar forest.The region has a low population density. The majority of people live from subsistence activities: hunting, fishing and small-scale agriculture. Trades include crocodile skins, dried fish and gaharu. Mixed crop gardens are located near the dwelling or on the river banks and are mostly planted with sweet potatoes (Ipomoea batatas) and manioc (Manihot utilissima). In these gardens, people plant bananas (Musa), coconuts (Cocos nucifera) and various vegetables.

Crocodiles are common in the rivers (typically two species: freshwater and saltwater, Crocodylus novaeguineae and Crocodylus porosus). The globally endangered Scott's kangaroo (Dendrolagus scottae) is thought to occur in the Foja Mountains, while the northern cassowary (Casuarius unappendiculatus), Victoria-crowned dove (Goura victoria) and black-spotted couscous (Spilocuscus rufoniger) form significant populations. Local endemic species include Philemon brassi, Amblyornis flavifrons, the Salvadoran fig parrot (Psittaculirostris salvadorii), and a number of frog, invertebrate and plant species. More than 70 new species have been reported. Noteworthy vertebrates include the rediscovery of the endemic Berlepsch's bird of paradise. As well as several new species, including the honeyeater (Melipotes carolae), the pigeon (Duculas), the dwarf opossum (Cercartetus), the giant rat (Mallomys), a Dorcopsulus and a bow-fingered gecko (Cyrtodactylus).

== History ==
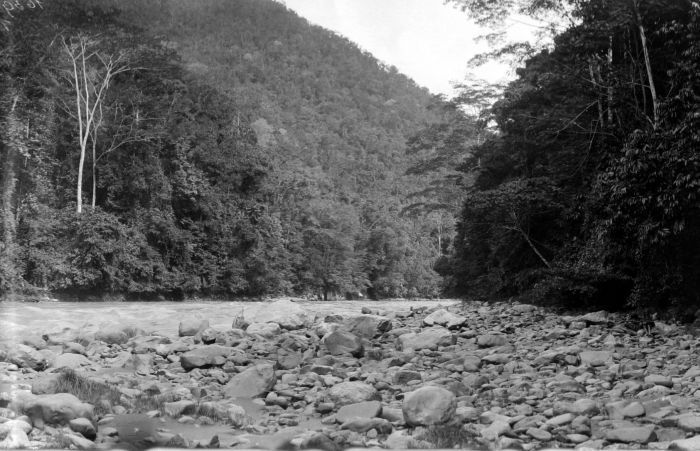
The upper Mamberamo River was photographed during the Central-North New Guinea Expedition led by Le Roux

In 1545, the Spanish navigator Iñigo Ortiz de Retes sailed along the northern coast of the island as far as the mouth of this river that he charted as San Agustín. At this spot, on 20 June 1545, he claimed the territory for the Spanish Crown, and in the process bestowed the name to the island (Nueva Guinea) by which it is known today.

The first European to enter the mouth of the Mamberamo was Dutchman Dr D. F. van Braam Morris in 1883. The residents from the northern Moluccas (Ternate) rowed up the river to ascertain that it was navigable by steamer. The following year in 1884 Van Braam Morris returned to the steamship Havik and travelled 60 mi (97 km) (as the crow flies) along its course.

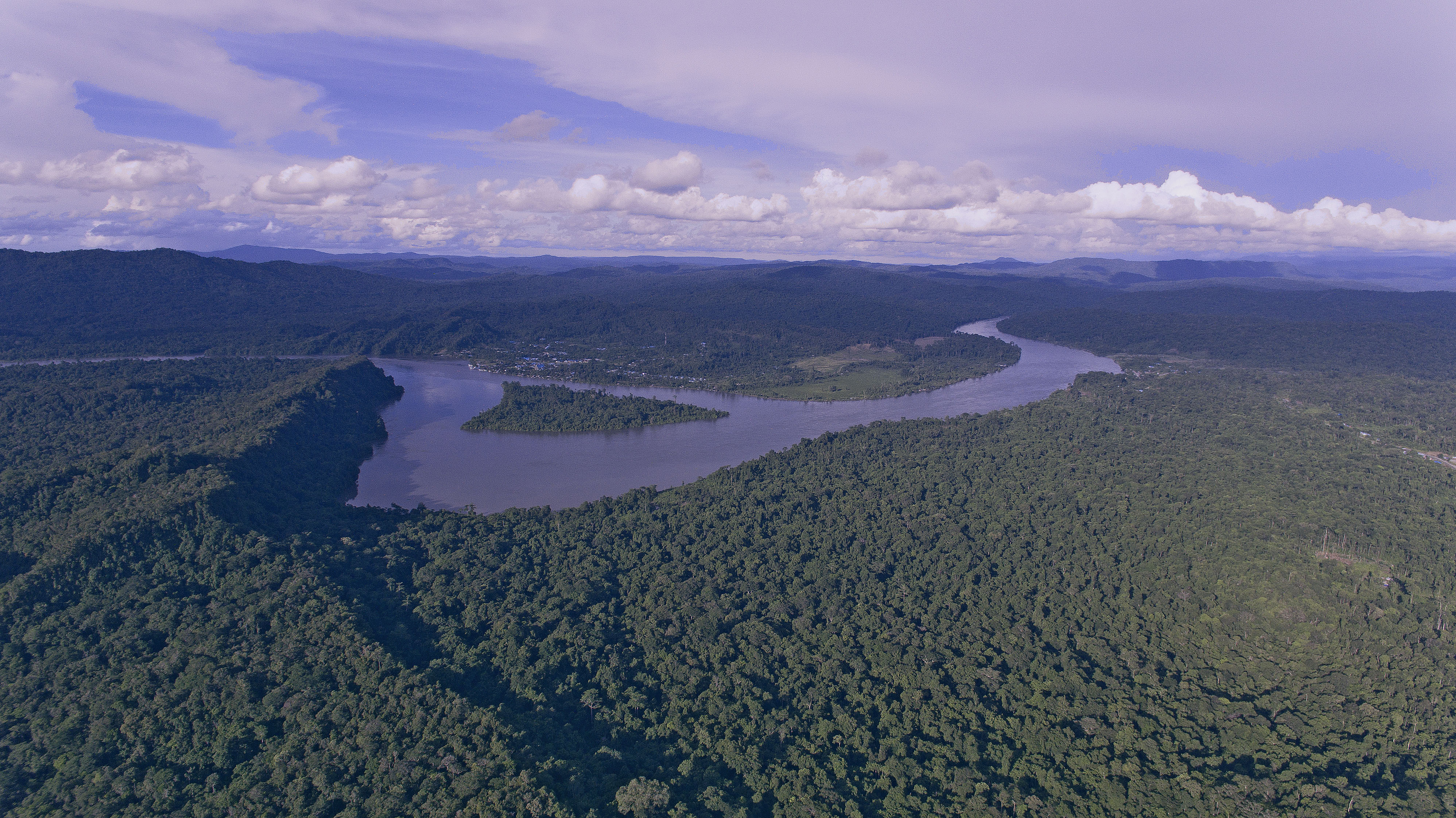
The Mamberamo River in 2017

== Mamberamo Foja Wildlife Reserve ==
The Mamberamo Foja Wildlife Reserve covers an area of 16,610 km^{2}, extending along the Mamberamo and its major tributaries from the Central Range foothills to the Pacific Ocean. It encompasses the central Lakes Plains region and extends southwards along the eastern side of the river to include the Foya Mountains, the river delta, and the sea.

== Mamberamo Bridge ==
The Mamberamo Bridge was the second longest cable-stayed span in Indonesia after Kutai Kartanegara Bridge with 235 meters and 270 meters respectively until the latter bridge collapsed in November 2011.

== See also ==
- List of drainage basins of Indonesia
- List of rivers of Oceania
- List of rivers of Indonesia
- List of rivers by discharge
- Mekong-Mamberamo linguistic area
- Lower Mamberamo languages
- Kwerba Mamberamo language
