= List of rivers of Western New Guinea =

Major rivers of Western New Guinea (Indonesian Papua)

This is a partial list of rivers of Western New Guinea in Indonesia (Indonesian Papua).

== In alphabetical order ==
- Apauwar River
- Baliem (Vriendschaps) River
- Becking River
- Bewani River
- Bian River
- Brazza River
- Bulaka River
- Digul
- Fly River
- Grime River
- Kampung River
- Kamundan River
- Kumbe River
- Lorentz (Undir) River
- Mamberamo
- Mandobo River
- Mapi River
- Maro (Merauke) River
- Mimika River
- Momats River
- Muturi River
- Nawa River
- Ok Tedi River
- Pauwasi River
- Pulau (Eilanden) River
- Seremuk River
- Tabai River
- Tami River
- Tariku River
- Taritatu River
- Tor River
- Sobger River
- Songgato River
- Sepik
- Van Daalen River
- Wamma River
- Wapoga River
- Warenai River
- Waruta River
- Wildeman River
- Wiriagar River
- Wiru River
- Wowei River

== By mouth location ==
From west to east:

=== North coast ===
- Wamma River
- Tabai River
- Warenai River
  - Wapoga River
- Mamberamo
  - Tariku River
    - Van Daalen River
  - Taritatu River
    - Sobger River
    - Waruta River
    - Songgato River
- Tor River
- Grime River
- Sepik
- Wowei River

=== South coast ===
- Seremuk River
- Kamundan River
- Wiriagar River
- Muturi River
- Momats River
- Lorentz/Undir River
- Pulau/Eilanden River
  - Brazza River
  - Kampung River
  - Vriendschaps/Baliem River
  - Wildeman River
- Mapi River
- Digul
- Bulaka River
- Bien River
- Kumbe River
- Maro/Merauke River
- Fly River
  - Ok Tedi River

== See also ==
- Drainage basins of Papua
- List of drainage basins of Indonesia
- List of rivers of Papua New Guinea
- List of rivers of Indonesia
