= Bewani =

Bewani may refer to:

- Bewani language, a dialect of Pagi, spoken in Papua New Guinea
- Bewani Mountains, mountain range in Papua New Guinea
- Bewani River, river in Western New Guinea, Indonesia

== See also ==
- Bewani-Wutung Onei Rural LLG, local level government in Sandaun Province, Papua New Guinea
