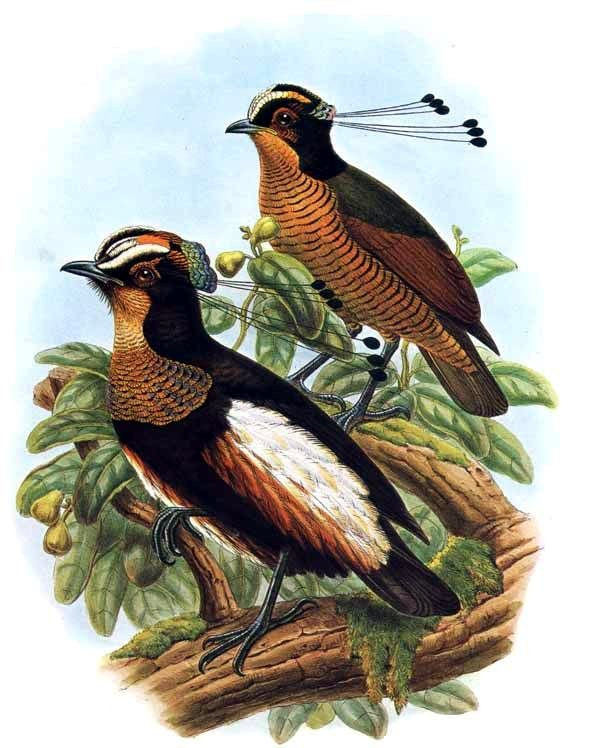

Conservation status
- Least Concern (IUCN 3.1)

Scientific classification
- Kingdom: Animalia
- Phylum: Chordata
- Class: Aves
- Order: Passeriformes
- Family: Paradisaeidae
- Genus: Parotia
- Species: P. carolae

Binomial name
- Parotia carolae Meyer, 1894

= Carola's parotia =

Species of bird

Carola's parotia (/kəˈroʊlɑːz pəˈroʊtiə/, Parotia carolae), also known as Queen Carola's six-wired bird-of-paradise or Queen Carola's parotia, is a species of bird-of-paradise.

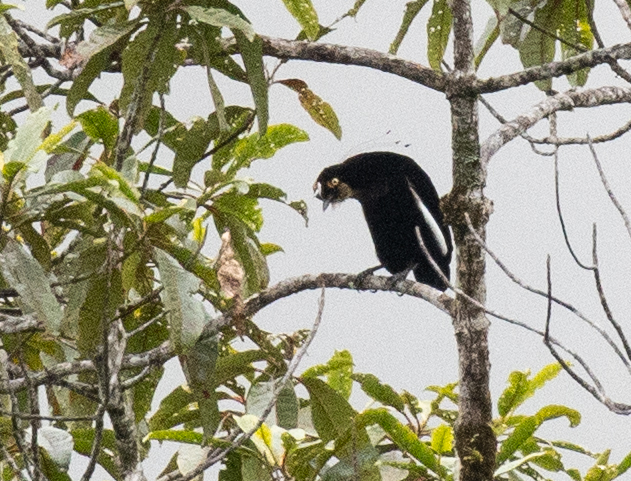
In Western Province, Papua New Guinea

One of the most colourful parotias, the Queen Carola's parotia inhabits the mid-mountain forests of central New Guinea. The diet consists mainly of fruits and arthropods. The stunning courtship dance of this species was described in detail by Scholes (2006). It is similar to that of Lawes's parotia but modified to present the iridescent throat plumage and the flank tufts to the best effect.

The name commemorates Queen Carola of Vasa, the wife of King Albert I of Saxony. The king was honored with the King of Saxony bird-of-paradise.

Widespread and common throughout its fairly remote range, the Queen Carola's parotia is evaluated as of least concern on the IUCN Red List of Threatened Species. It is listed in Appendix II of CITES.

== Description ==
Carola's parotia is medium-sized, up to 26 cm long. Male nominate race has velvety jet-black head with coppery-bronze sheen, short erectile blackish-bronzed frontal crest tipped silver-white, jet-black elongate and vertically raised loral and foreface feathering from nostril to above eye; eye broadly encircled by iridescent coppery-gold feathering; feathering on slightly concave crown similar to that around eye, and immediately behind this a narrow nuchal bar of highly iridescent scale-like feathers that appear blue-green to purple and/or magenta; behind each eye, from amid ear-tuft of elongate narrowly pointed feathers, three long erectile wire-like occipital plumes with relatively small spatulate tips; mantle to uppertail velvety jet-black with coppery-bronze sheen, including upperwing the same except for primaries and coverts, which are brownish-black; chin dusky olive-brown, smudged blackish, with paler tips of elongate "whiskers" surrounded by malar area and throat of buff with golden sheen; lower central throat more whitish, flecked cinnamon, with fine long whiskers on each side, grading into otherwise discrete breast shield of large scale-like feathers with intense iridescence of bronzed yellow-green and/or magenta to pink (jet-black feather bases visible on lower side of shield); remaining central underparts, to undertail-coverts, blackish-brown with iridescent lustrous coppery sheen, becoming browner to dark reddish-brown adjacent to an extensive patch of cotton-white elongate and inwardly curving flank plumes; iris sulphur-yellow; bill black, mouth colour apparently pale green; legs blackish-grey.

The female is smaller than the male (notably in wing length) but with a longer tail; lacks head plumes and iridescence; plumage is very different, brownish to grey-brown head with broad supercilium, moustachial and submoustachial stripes dirty white, flecked olive-brown, some paler flecks extending onto anterior ear-coverts, malar area olive-brown, upperparts and tail brown, upperwing with ochraceous chestnut area on exposed parts of flight-feathers and outer greater coverts, chin faintly barred greyish-brown, throat paler, underparts buff with blackish-brown barring; iris pale grey or cream to yellow (difference possibly age-related), but confirmation required. Juvenile undescribed; immature male like adult female, but iris pale grey; subadult male variable, like adult female but with few feathers of adult male plumage intruding, initially on head, to like adult male with few feathers of female-like plumage remaining; male tail length decreases considerably with age.

Race meeki is like the nominate in size and appearance but the bill is slightly larger, and chin and side of the throat blackish; chalcothorax is like the nominate, but occipital plumes are significantly longer, upperparts with bright coppery sheen, underparts more coppery, and long loral feathering more brownish (less intensely black); clelandiorum is like the nominate, but upperparts are darker, more jet-black (less brown), and on average larger, bill slightly shorter, and with longer occipital plumes (almost no overlap in length with nominate); chrysenia has a tail longer than all other races, occipital plumes longer than all except chalcothorax, said to differ from the nominate in having long black loral feathering with coppery sheen (like eyering but darker) but several specimens lack this (their lores being pure black). Females vary subtly with race, notably in the extent of pale facial stripes and in overall colour saturation.

== Behaviour and ecology ==
Carola's parotia's ecology is not well studied, but from recorded data, the birds have some of the most complex leks in the avian world. The birds are polygynous. Males maintain seasonal courts on the ground, which are dispersed to form exploded leks. The males' displays consist of crouching, flexing their white flank feathers, hopping, showing their breastplates, shaking their spatulate head plumes, spreading their flank feathers into a "tutu", fluttering their wings, and many other actions. His audience may consist of many females, in which most may be interested and some may seek other males. The female, like most other female birds-of-paradise, handles all of the nesting and parental duties, but the exact information on their breeding patterns is unknown. The species has been recorded hybridizing with Lophorina superba.

== Subspecies ==
Queen Carola's parotia often includes the enigmatic Berlepsch's parotia as a subspecies, but the information gained when it was rediscovered in 2005 hardened the case for considering them a distinct species.

- Parotia carolae carolae (Weyland Mountains E to Wissel Lakes (Paniai) region, in W New Guinea.)
- Parotia carolae chalcothorax (Doorman Mts, just S of Idenburg R (Taritatu R), in W New Guinea.)
- Parotia carolae chrysenia (N scarp of C Cordillera, including Lordberg, Hunstein Mts and probably Schrader Range, also N scarp of Bismarck Range, in E New Guinea.)
- Parotia carolae clelandiorum (from C New Guinea SE probably to S watershed of Eastern Highlands (E at least to Crater Mt)).
- Parotia carolae meeki (Snow Mts, from E of Wissel Lakes and S of Doorman Mts (N scarp facing Mamberamo R), E to C New Guinea (around W edge of Victor Emanuel Range)).
