= Keerom =

Keerom may refer to

- Keerom Regency, Papua Province, Indonesia
- Keerom River, northern Western Papua, Papua Province, Indonesia
- Keerom Dam, near Worcester, Western Cape, South Africa
- Keerom Mountain, Worcester, South Africa
- Keerom, farm, start of Brandfort town in South Africa
- Keerom, farm, start of Middelburg, Mpumalanga town in South Africa
