= Northern New Guinea montane rain forests =

Ecoregion in New Guinea

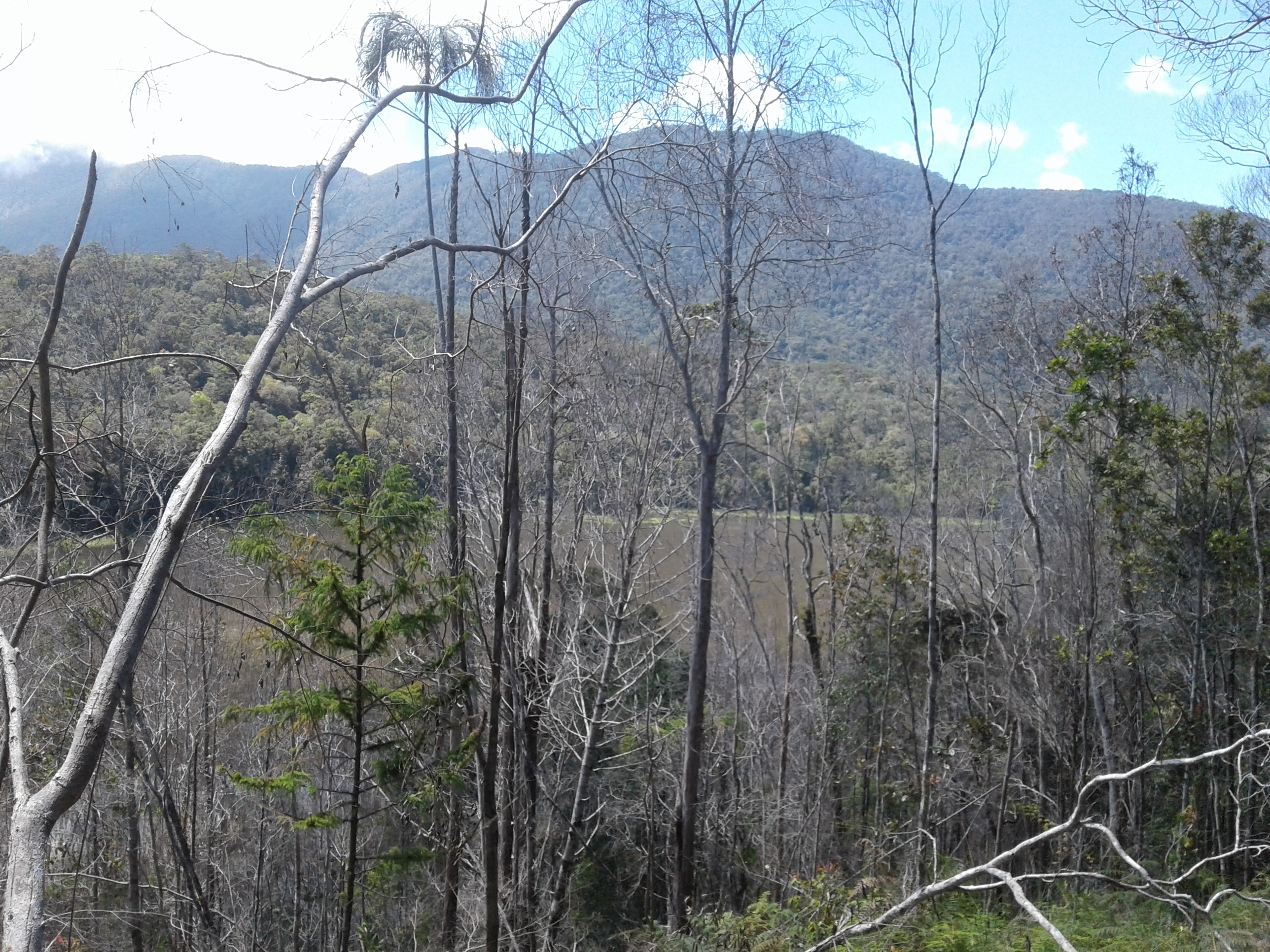
- Cyclops Mountains, near Jayapura, Papua, Indonesia

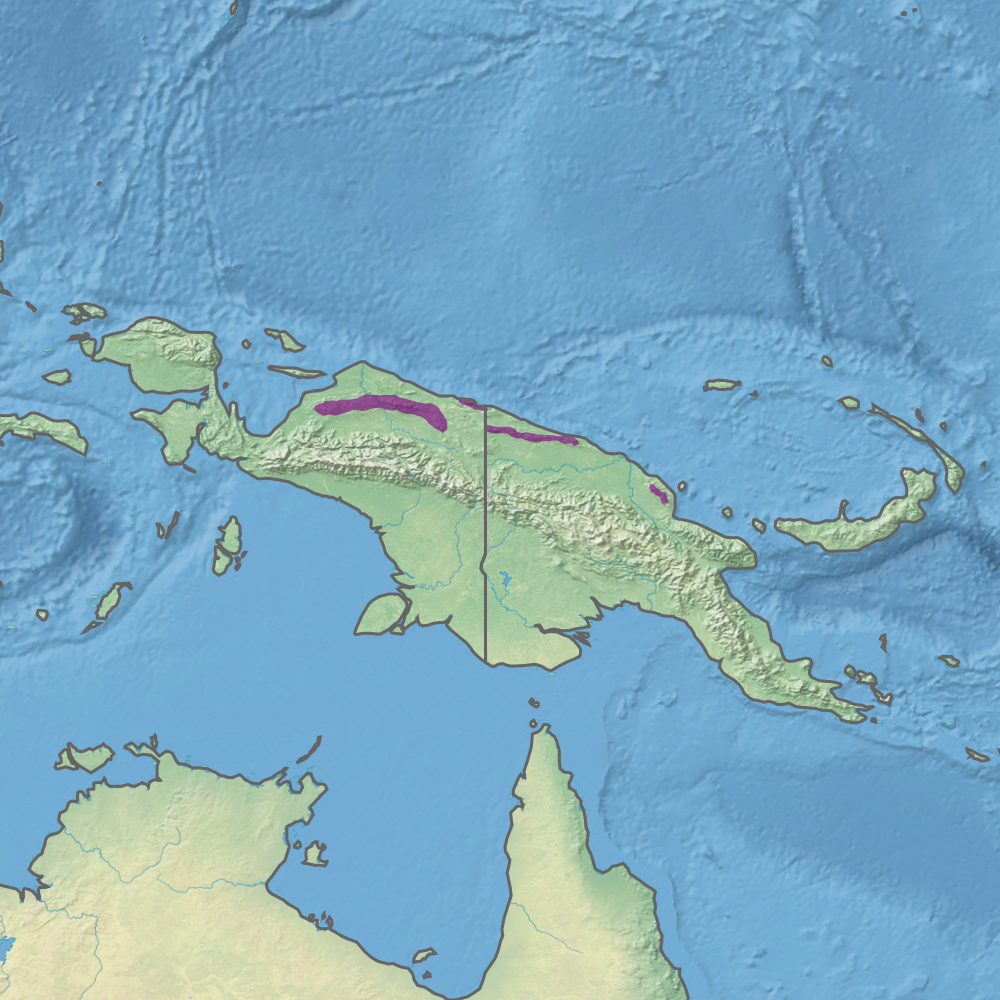
- Ecoregion territory (in purple)

Ecology
- Realm: Australasian realm
- Biome: tropical and subtropical moist broadleaf forests
- Borders: Northern New Guinea lowland rain and freshwater swamp forests

Geography
- Area: 23,171 km^{2} (8,946 sq mi)
- Countries: Indonesia; Papua New Guinea
- Provinces: Papua (Indonesia); East Sepik; Madang, Sandaun (Papua New Guinea)
- Coordinates: 2.5°S 138.3°E

Conservation
- Conservation status: Critical/endangered
- Protected: 3,374 km² (15%)

The Northern New Guinea montane rain forests is a tropical moist forest ecoregion in northern New Guinea. The ecoregion covers several separate mountain ranges lying north of New Guinea's Central Range and south of the Pacific Ocean.

== Geography ==
The ecoregion includes the montane forests above 1000 meters elevation in the Van Rees Mountains, Gauttier-Foya Mountains, Cyclops Mountains, Bewani Mountains, Torricelli Mountains, Prince Alexander Mountains, and Adelbert Mountains. These isolated mountain ranges rise from the northern New Guinea lowlands, running generally east–west and between the Central Range and the sea. The northern New Guinea mountains are not as high as the Central Range; the Van Rees mountains reach to 1,430 m (4,690 ft), Foya to 2,193 m (7,195 ft), the Cyclops to 2,158 m (7,080 ft), the Bewani to 2,000 m (6,600 ft), the Torricelli to 1,650 m (5,410 ft), the Prince Alexander to 1,240 m (4,070 ft), and the Adelbert Mountains to 1,718 m (5,636 ft).

The montane forests are surrounded by Northern New Guinea lowland rain and freshwater swamp forests at lower elevations but differ from the lowland forests in form and species composition.

== Climate ==
The ecoregion has a montane tropical rain forest climate.

== Flora ==
Montane tropical rain forests cover most of the ecoregion. The montane forests generally have a lower canopy than the lowland rain forests. Trees have smaller crowns, smaller glossy green leaves, and lack buttress roots. Common canopy trees include species of Nothofagus, Lithocarpus, Castanopsis, Syzygium, and Ilex, the families Lauraceae, Cunoniaceae, Myrtaceae, and Elaeocarpaceae, and various conifers. Nothofagus and the conifer Araucaria can grow in pure and dense stands. Myrtaceae, Elaeocarpaceae, and conifers become more common at higher altitudes. Above 2000 meters elevation, the conifers Dacrycarpus, Podocarpus, Phyllocladus, and Papuacedrus predominate as canopy trees and emergents.

== Fauna ==
The ecoregion has 51 species of mammals, including marsupials, murid rodents, and bats. There are three endemic mammal species, Scott's tree kangaroo (Dendrolagus scottae), Cyclops long-beaked echidna (Zaglossus attenboroughi), and northern glider (Petaurus abidi).

The ecoregion has four endemic bird species – Mayr's forest rail (Rallina mayri), golden-fronted bowerbird (Amblyornis flavifrons), fire-maned bowerbird (Sericulus bakeri), and Mayr's honeyeater (Ptiloprora mayri). It encompasses the North Papuan mountains endemic bird area.

== Protected areas ==
A 2017 assessment found that 3,374 km^{2} (1,303 sq mi), or 15%, of the ecoregion is in protected areas. About half of the unprotected area is still forested. Protected areas include Mamberamo-Foja Wildlife Reserve and Pegunungan Cyclops Nature Reserve in Indonesia.
