= Prince Alexander Mountains =

Mountain range in Papua New Guinea

- Location within Papua New Guinea

Geography
- Country: Papua New Guinea
- Range coordinates: 3°30′S 143°05′E

The Prince Alexander Mountains are a mountain range in Papua New Guinea. The range is located on the northern coast of New Guinea. The Torricelli Mountains lie to the west, and the basin of the Sepik River lies to the south. Mount Turu is a notable peak, located towards the eastern end of the range.

== Ecology ==
The portion of the range above 1000 meters elevation is home to the Northern New Guinea montane rain forests ecoregion, which also extends across portions of the neighboring ranges. The slopes below 1000 meters are part of the Northern New Guinea lowland rain and freshwater swamp forests.
