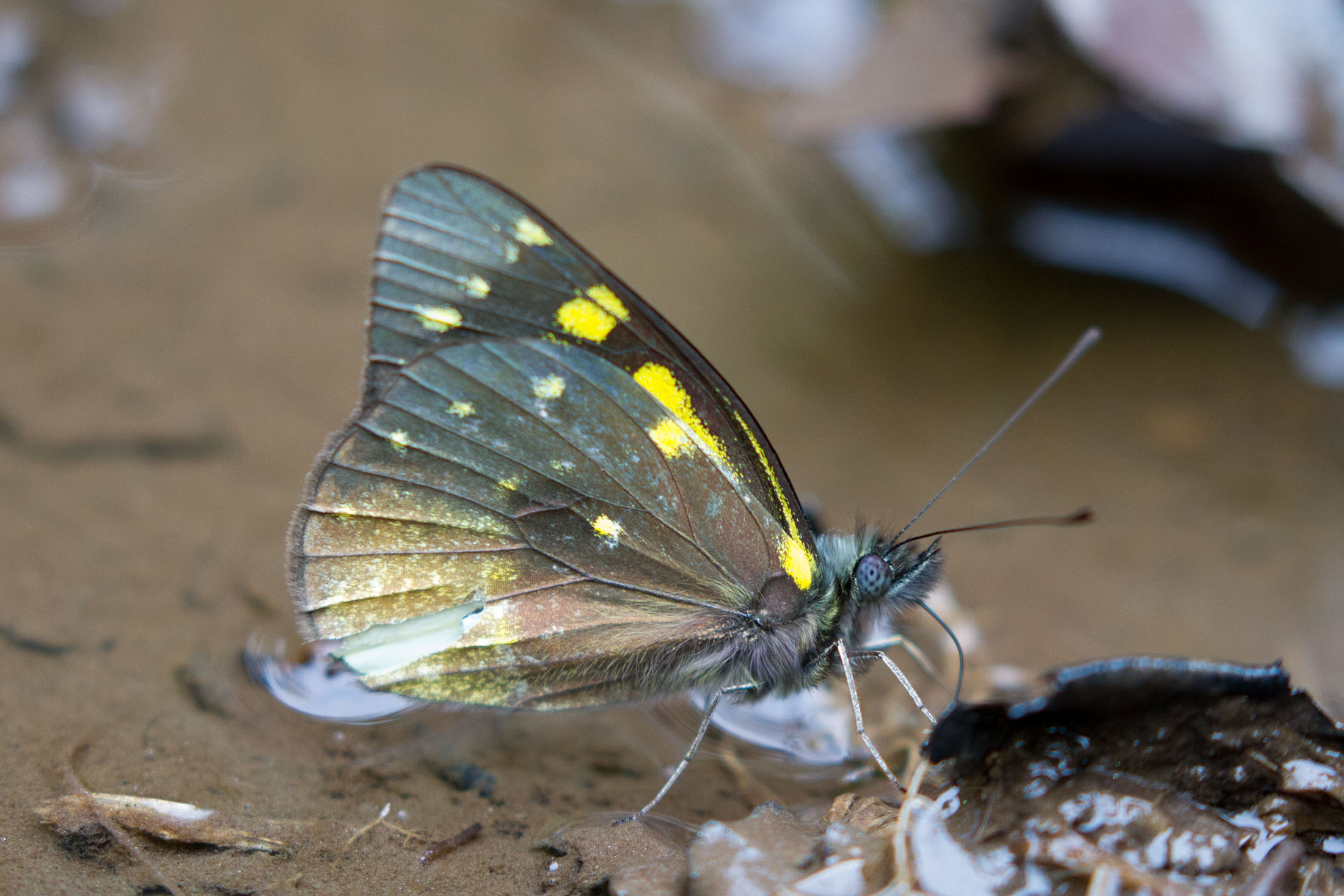
- Delias microsticha flavopicta male
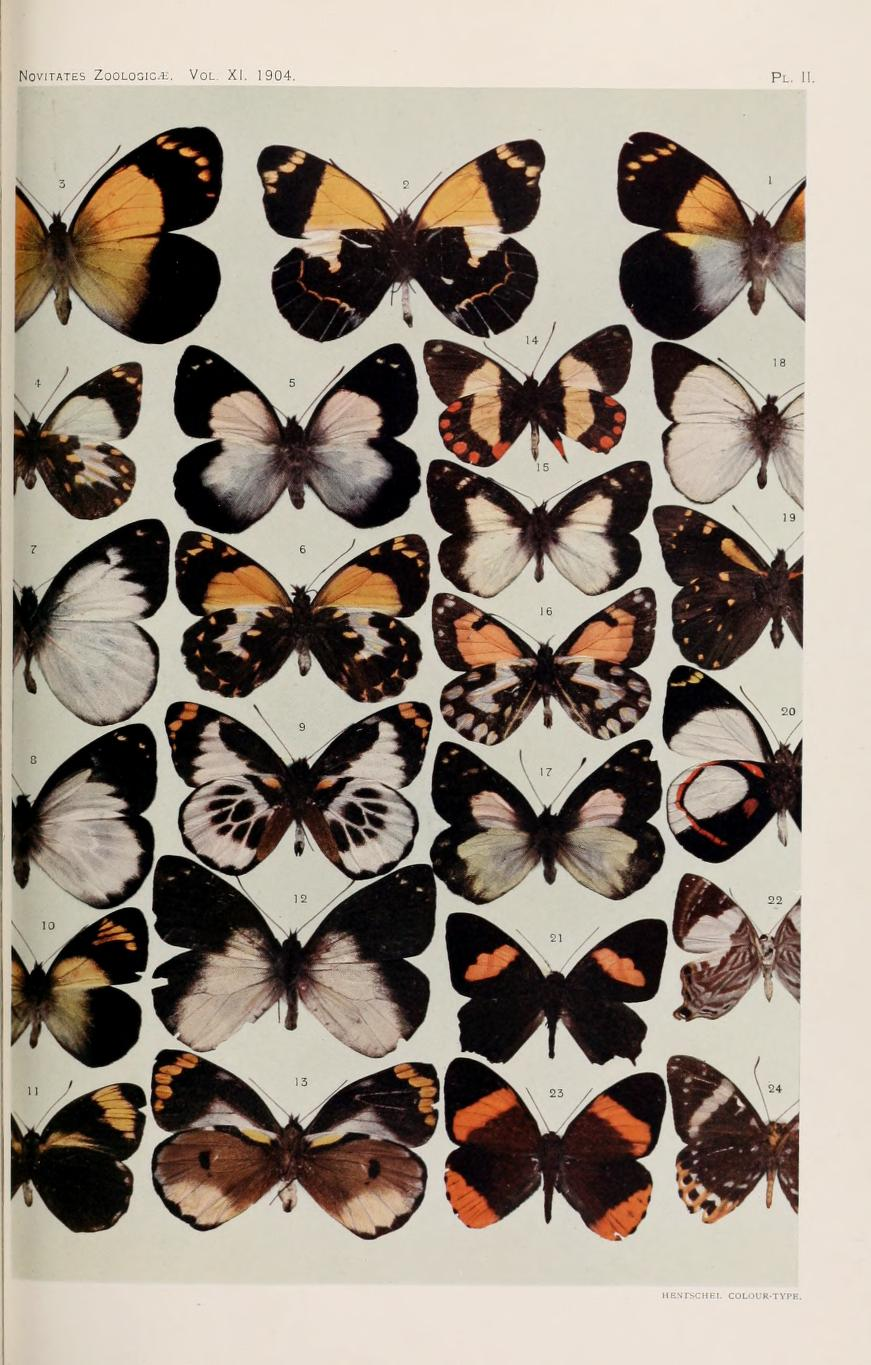
- figs 18,19

Scientific classification
- Kingdom: Animalia
- Phylum: Arthropoda
- Class: Insecta
- Order: Lepidoptera
- Family: Pieridae
- Genus: Delias
- Species: D. microsticha

Binomial name
- Delias microsticha Rothschild, 1904

Synonyms
- Delias microsticha f. albifascia Talbot, 1924

= Delias microsticha =

Species of butterfly

Delias microsticha is a butterfly in the family Pieridae. It was described by Walter Rothschild in 1904. It is endemic to New Guinea.

== Description ==
Original

Delias microsticha spec. nov. (PI. II. f. 18. 19, males).

Male. Wings, upperside, white. Forewing: costal edge and a broad distal border black; this border gradually narrowed posticad, reaching as far proximad as base of R1 and being only 1 to l.5 mm. broad at SM2, concave proximally, slightly incised at the veins. Hindwing with thin black distal border. Underside purplish olive-black, glossy on hindwing and at apex of forewing.

Forewing: a broad streak in cell, gradually narrowed to base, two spots beyond apex of cell, and a series of subapical respectively submarginal dots.

Hindwing: a basal costal spot crimson; a spot in middle of costal margin, a row of submarginal dots, a spot in cell beyond middle, and a row of thin short streaks on disc yellow.

Female. Not known.

Hab. Owgarra, north of head of Aroa River, May 1903. Several specimens.

== Subspecies ==
- D. m. microsticha (Central Highlands, Papua New Guinea)
- D. m. flavopicta Jordan, [1912] (Arfak Mountains, Irian Jaya)
- D. m. serratula Toxopeus, 1955 Weyland Mountains through the Snow Mountains to the Central Mountains, Irian Jaya
- D. m. weja Mastrigt, 2006 (Foja Mountains, Irian Jaya)
