= Baliem River =

Baliem River Vriendschaps River
- Location within Western New Guinea

Physical characteristics
- Source
  - location: Lake Habbema, Indonesia
  - coordinates: 4°8′14″S 138°39′33″E
  - elevation: 3,300 m (10,800 ft)
- Mouth
  - location: Pulau River
  - coordinates: 5°28′32″S 138°52′56″E
  - elevation: 20 m (66 ft)
- Length: 414.2 km (257.4 mi)
- Basin size: 12,000 km^{2} (4,600 mi^{2})
- Width
  - minimum: 15 m (49 ft)(Wamena, Upper Baliem)
  - maximum: 20 m (66 ft)(Wamena, Upper Baliem)
- Depth
  - minimum: 0.6 m (2 ft 0 in)(Wamena, Upper Baliem)
  - maximum: 3.7 m (12 ft)(Wamena, Upper Baliem)
- Discharge
  - location: Near mouth
  - average: 702 m^{3}/s (24,800 cu ft/s)

The Baliem River (or Vriendschaps River) is a river in the Highland Papua and South Papua provinces of Western New Guinea, Indonesia. It is the largest tributary of the Pulau River, formerly called the Eilanden River. With a total length of 414.2 km (257.4 mi).

== Hydrology ==
The river begins as the Baliem Timur (East Baliem) in the northern Maoke Mountains (Snow Mountains) at Lake Habbema in Jayawijaya Regency, north of Mount Trikora. The Baliem Timur flows west to meet the Baliem Barat (West Baliem) before turning north. After traveling underground for several kilometers through a sinkhole in an area of Karst limestone geology, it emerges and travels northeast to near Tiom in Lanny Jaya Regency. This section of the river was formerly known as the Noordelijke Baliem (North Baliem) in Dutch. After flowing east through Lanny Jaya, the Baliem turns southeast as it enters the wide, flat Great Baliem Valley. In the center of the valley, it meanders southeast to meet the Uwe River in the town of Wamena, the capital of Highland Papua province. South of Wamena, the river plunges southeast through a steep gorge with many rapids and waterfalls and is joined by the Mugi and Kwik rivers. 70 kilometers southeast of Wamena the Heluk River enters the Baliem near Holuwon village. From here, the river was called Vriendschaps River at the time of Dutch East Indies and Dutch New Guinea, before the course of the river was fully explored.

Below Holuwon, the river leaves the southern foothills of the Maoke or Jayawijaya Mountains and becomes a braided river heading to the southwest through the lowland rainforest of South Papua. After 100 kilometers, the Baliem, slightly upstream from the village of Kaima, flows into the Pulau River (formerly the Eilanden River), which flows into the Arafura Sea about 100 kilometers southwest on the Casuarina Coast.

== Ecology ==
The Baliem River has a length of about 60–80 km with a width of 15–20 m, flowing through the town of Wamena. The water temperature is around 14 to 18 °C. The acidity of the Baliem River is around 6.8–7.5, and the oxygen level is 4.1–4.3 mg/L. The flow rate is 0.09–0.92 m/det.; clarity 17–160 cm and depth 0.60–3.7 meter.

The river is inhabited by a crayfish of the genus Cherax, highly valued by the locals, which is nocturnally active along the shoreline and then returns to deep waters during the daytime. The river is flanked by flood-prone swamps which local pigs roam in.

== Geography ==
The river flows in the southern area of Papua with a predominantly tropical rainforest climate (designated as Af in the Köppen-Geiger climate classification). The annual average temperature in the area is 21 °C. The warmest month is March, when the average temperature is around 22 °C, and the coldest is July, at 18 °C. The average annual rainfall is 6222 mm. The wettest month is May, with an average of 708 mm rainfall, and the driest is January, with 348 mm rainfall.

== See also ==
- List of drainage basins of Indonesia
- List of rivers of Indonesia
- List of rivers of Western Papua
