= Wiru River =

River in South Papua, Indonesia

- Location in South Papua Location in Indonesia

Location
- Country: Indonesia
- Province: South Papua

Physical characteristics
- Source
  - location: Indonesia
- Mouth
  - coordinates: 5.70204°S 139.31603°E

The Wiru River is a river in Western New Guinea, South Papua Province, Indonesia.

== See also ==
- List of drainage basins of Indonesia
- List of rivers of Western New Guinea
