= Mekong–Mamberamo linguistic area =

Proposed sprachbund (linguistic area)

The Mekong–Mamberamo linguistic area is a linguistic area proposed by David Gil (2015). It combines the Mainland Southeast Asia linguistic area with the languages of the Nusantara archipelago and western New Guinea. The linguistic area covers Mainland Southeast Asia, Malaysia (including both peninsular Malaysia and Borneo), and all of Indonesia except for the parts of central New Guinea that are located east of the Mamberamo River.

== Features ==
Gil (2015:271) lists 17 features that are characteristic of the Mekong-Mamberamo linguistic area.

1. passing gesture
2. repeated dental clicks expressing amazement
3. conventionalized greeting with ‘where’
4. ‘eye day’ > ‘sun’ lexicalization
5. d/t place-of-articulation asymmetry
6. numeral classifiers
7. verby adjectives
8. basic SVO word order
9. iamitive perfects
10. ‘give’ causatives
11. low differentiation of adnominal attributive constructions
12. weakly developed grammatical voice
13. isolating word structure
14. short words
15. low grammatical-morpheme density
16. optional thematic-role flagging
17. optional tense–aspect–mood marking
