= Kampung River =

Coordinates: 5.73505°S 138.40099°E

Kampung River Sungai Kampung, Sungai Kampong, As-Rivier, Kampoeng-rivier
- Location of river mouth Kampung River (Indonesia)

Location
- Country: Indonesia

Physical characteristics
- Source
  - location: Western Papua
- Mouth
  - location: Pulau River

The Kampung River is a river in southern South Papua, Indonesia. It is a tributary of the Pulau River.

== Geography ==
The river flows in the southern area of Papua with predominantly tropical rainforest climate (designated as Af in the Köppen-Geiger climate classification). The annual average temperature in the area is 23 °C. The warmest month is December, when the average temperature is around 25 °C, and the coldest is July, at 20 °C. The average annual rainfall is 5547 mm. The wettest month is May, with an average of 594 mm rainfall, and the driest is July, with 384 mm rainfall.

== See also ==
- List of drainage basins of Indonesia
- List of rivers of Indonesia
- List of rivers of Western New Guinea
