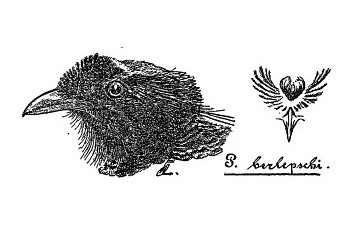
- The first illustration of the bronze parotia published in the Journal fur Ornithologie in 1897 to compare the new species to the Carola's parotia.

Conservation status
- Least Concern (IUCN 3.1)

Scientific classification
- Kingdom: Animalia
- Phylum: Chordata
- Class: Aves
- Order: Passeriformes
- Family: Paradisaeidae
- Genus: Parotia
- Species: P. berlepschi

Binomial name
- Parotia berlepschi Kleinschmidt, 1897

Synonyms
- Parotia carolae berlepschi

= Bronze parotia =

Species of bird

The bronze parotia (Parotia berlepschi), also known as the Foja parotia, Berlepsch's parotia or Berlepsch's six-wired bird-of-paradise, is a species of bird-of-paradise, in the family Paradisaeidae. It resembles and is often considered to be a subspecies of Carola's parotia, but a high majority of authorities support its specific status.

The species share many differentiated features (see Description), though the Carola's parotia is more studied than the elusive bronze parotia. The species was first described by Otto Kleinschmidt in 1897.

== Etymology ==
The bronze parotia's scientific name is Parotia berlepschi. The genus name, Parotia is composed of par, meaning "near" and Ancient Greek ωτος ōtos for "ear", specifically meaning "curl of hair by the ear", referring to six head plumes on each side of the head, characteristic to males of the genus Parotia. Its specific name, berlepschi, honors Hans von Berlepsch, a German ornithologist (1850-1915).

== Description ==
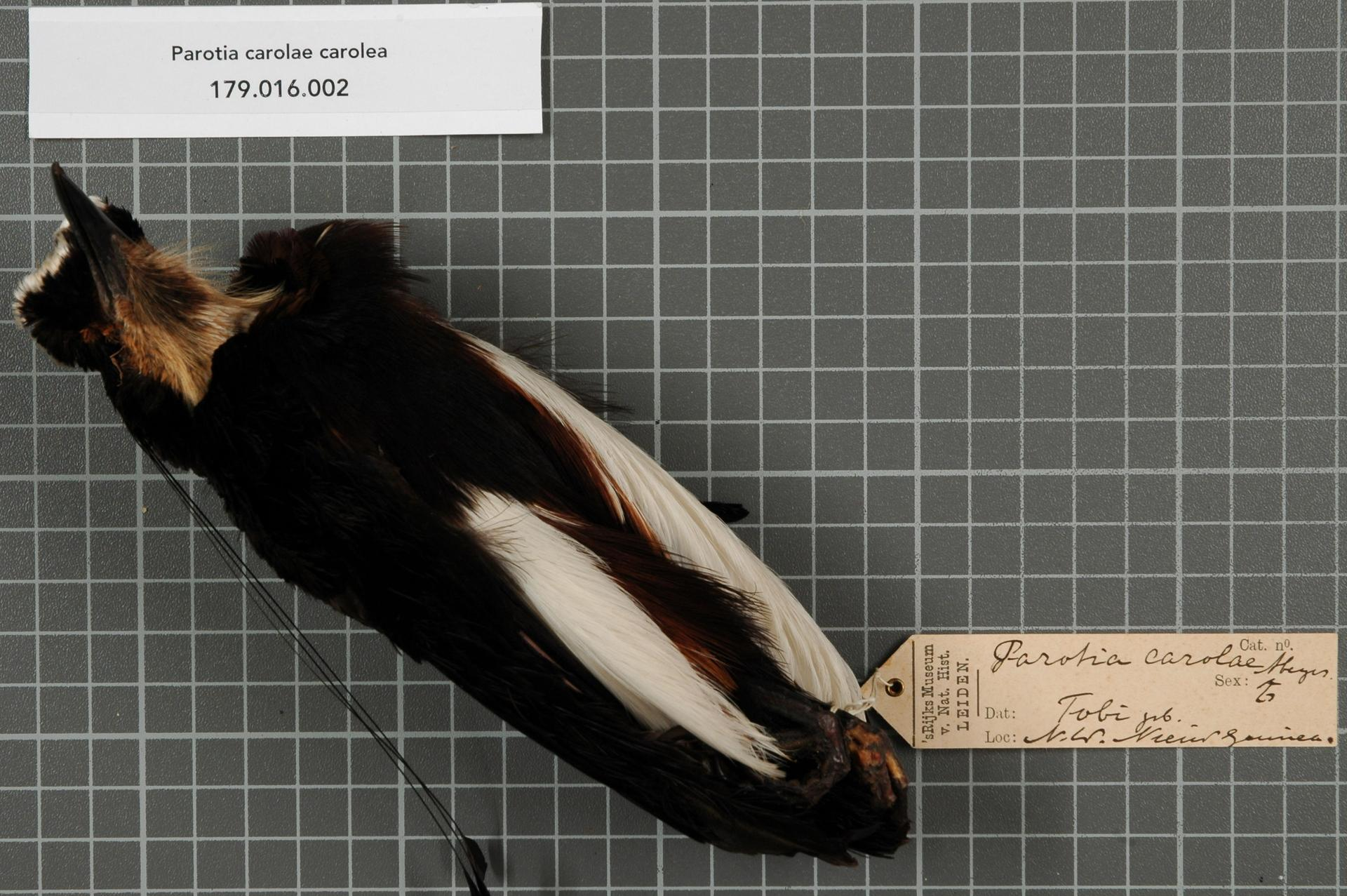
Male Carola's parotia specimen for reference. Note the golden face of this species that is a major factor that sets it and the bronze parotia apart.

Arguably one of the more drab members of its family, the male bronze parotia has a blackish body in general with a conspicuous oily bronze sheen, more greenish in the neck area, that gives the bird its common name. The differences in the facial and head area is much more differentiated from the sister species; the frontal crest of the bronze parotia is mostly black with only a more reduced portion of white tips towards the center of it rather than an extended area of white found in Carola's; the inner "bowl" of the frontal crest is greenish gold. There also is a very thin, orange stripe that ends in a circle that encircles the eyes. Another characteristic of the genus are the six head plumes, anatomically called occipital plumes, long, wire-like feathers with black, spatulate tips. His chin feathers are greyish to rusty brown, based by a dull gold. These "whiskers" lead to the Parotia-characteristic, iridescent breast plate composed of scale-like feathers, each with a black, dotted center, and shine pink, orange, green, blue, yellow, gold, violet and orange, depending on the light angle; however, the breast shield is typically inconspicuous in most views. Like other parotias, the male has elongated flank plumes on his sides used in their displays; additionally, found only in Carola's and this species, these flank feathers are black and white, the white standing out on the body. It has a short, black tail, which is shorter than Carola's. It has a relatively robust, more prominently hooked, grey-black bill, light blue-greyish eyes surrounded by an orange ring, and grey-black legs and feet. The female is drastically different from the female, being light brown above with reddish wings, light brown tail, and a brown and white head. She is creamy below, covered by brown-blackish barring.

== Behavior and ecology ==
Because of its inaccessibility, the ecology of the bronze parotia is very poorly described. Its diet may consist of fruits, arthropods, and possibly other animal prey. Its courtship behavior may be similar to Carola's parotia courtship behavior. According to bird-of-paradise expert Edwin Scholes, actions include court clearing, mat construction, horizontal perch pivot display, hop and shake display, and leaf presentation. Parotias, along with other ground-performing birds-of-paradise, like to keep a clean court, tossing leaves, twigs, moss, etc., as the stage will be judged by the observing female(s). The presentation of leaves is used as a "badge of ownership" to rid of prospecting males; this behavior is seen in Carola's parotia displays, to which one of the most complex courtship sequences in the avian realm belongs. The perch pivots include the flank feathers fluffed out to where they form a semi-circle around the body, as well as the head and tail cocked, all while abruptly jerking the body from side to side. Other courtship behaviors include flexing of the frontal crest, hopping, bowing, shaking of chin feathers, and raising of flank plumes.

== History ==
Many unknown Parotia specimens arose in Europe in the late 1800s and were owned by Berlepch. Unlike Carola's parotia, the specimens kept by Berlepsch had smaller bills with more of a prominent hooked tip, different plumage figures, and very slight size difference. The specimen was given its current scientific name to honor its owner in 1897.

=== Rediscovery ===
Previously known only from four specimens, the home of this little known bird-of-paradise was located in 1985 by the American scientist Jared Diamond at the Foja Mountains of Papua, Indonesia. Diamond encountered only the female of this species. In December 2005, an international team of eleven scientists from the United States, Australia and Indonesia, led by ornithologist and Conservation International vice-president Bruce Beehler traveled to the unexplored areas of Foja Mountains and rediscovered the bronze parotia among other little known and new species. The first photographs of them were taken during the rediscovery.
