= Wamma River =

Coordinates: 3.3751°S 135.219°E

Wamma River Wama, Sungai Wama, Wai Wamma, Sungai Wami, Sungai Wamma, Wamma-rivier
- Location of river mouth Wamma River (Indonesia)

Location
- Country: Indonesia

Physical characteristics
- Source
  - location: Central Papua
- Mouth: Cenderawasih Bay
  - location: Hamuku, Nabire Regency

The Wamma River (Wami River) is a river in Central Papua, Indonesia.

== Geography ==
The river flows in the northern area of Papua with predominantly tropical rainforest climate (designated as Af in the Köppen-Geiger climate classification). The annual average temperature in the area is 22 °C. The warmest month is June, when the average temperature is around 23 °C, and the coldest is February, at 22 °C. The average annual rainfall is 5380 mm. The wettest month is March, with an average of 583 mm rainfall, and the driest is October, with 256 mm rainfall.

== See also ==
- List of drainage basins of Indonesia
- List of rivers of Indonesia
- List of rivers of Western New Guinea
- Teluk Cenderawasih National Park
