= Van Daalen River =

Van Daalen River Sungai Vandalen, Van Daalen Rivier
- Location within Central Papua Location within Western New Guinea Location within Indonesia

Location
- Country: Indonesia
- Province: Central Papua

Physical characteristics
- Source: confluence of Toradja and Ruhl
  - location: Kampung Golu, Bina District, Puncak
  - coordinates: 3.381°S 137.466°E
- Mouth: Tariku River (border of Central Papua and Papua)
  - location: Kampung Deide, Dagai District, Puncak Jaya
  - coordinates: 3.024°S 138.057°E
  - elevation: 72 m (236 ft)
- Length: 140 km (87 mi)

The Van Daalen River (Indonesian: Sungai Vandalen) is a river of Western New Guinea in Puncak Jaya and Puncak, Central Papua, Indonesia. It is a tributary of Tariku River.

The river is named after Arjan van Daalen.

== Geography ==
The river flows in the northern area of Papua with predominantly tropical rainforest climate (designated as Af in the Köppen-Geiger climate classification). The annual average temperature in the area is 21 °C (70 °F). The warmest month is October, when the average temperature is around 22 °C (72 °F), and the coldest is January, at 18 °C (64 °F). The average annual rainfall is 5,121 mm (201.6 in). The wettest month is March, with an average of 573 mm (22.6 in) rainfall, and the driest is July, with 324 mm (12.8 in) rainfall.

== See also ==
- List of drainage basins of Indonesia
- List of rivers of Indonesia
- List of rivers of Western Papua
