= Waruta River =

River in Papua Indonesia

Coordinates: 3.3°S 140.13333°E

Waruta River Sungai Waruta, Waroeta River, Nawa Waroeta
- Location of river mouth Waruta River (Indonesia)

Location
- Country: Indonesia

Physical characteristics
- Source
  - location: Western Papua
- Mouth
  - location: Taritatu River

The Waruta River is a river in northern Western Papua in the province of Papua, Indonesia. It is a tributary of the Taritatu River.

== Geography ==
The river flows in the northern area of Papua with predominantly tropical rainforest climate (designated as Af in the Köppen-Geiger climate classification). The annual average temperature in the area is 21 °C. The warmest month is July, when the average temperature is around 22 °C, and the coldest is March, at 20 °C. The average annual rainfall is 3489 mm. The wettest month is March, with an average of 444 mm rainfall, and the driest is July, with 162 mm rainfall.

== See also ==
- List of drainage basins of Indonesia
- List of rivers of Indonesia
- List of rivers of Western New Guinea
