= Grime River =

- Location of river mouth

Location
- Country: Indonesia

Physical characteristics
- Source
  - location: Western Papua
- Mouth: Pacific Ocean
  - coordinates: 2.3603°S 140.0358°E

The Grime River is a river in northern New Guinea, in Papua province, Indonesia.

The Nimboran languages are spoken in the Grime River watershed.

== See also ==
- List of drainage basins of Indonesia
- List of rivers of Indonesia
- List of rivers of Western New Guinea
- Grime River languages
