= Wildeman River =

Coordinates: 5°33′S 139°13′E

Wildeman River Sungai Wildeman, Wildeman-rivier, Sungai Widemen
- Location of river mouth Wildeman River (Indonesia)

Location
- Country: Indonesia

Physical characteristics
- Source
  - location: Western Papua
- Mouth
  - location: Pulau River

The Wildeman River is a river in South Papua, Indonesia. It is a tributary of the Pulau River.

== Geography ==
The river flows in the southern area of Papua with predominantly tropical rainforest climate (designated as Af in the Köppen-Geiger climate classification). The annual average temperature in the area is 21 °C. The warmest month is January, when the average temperature is around 24 °C, and the coldest is July, at 19 °C. The average annual rainfall is 6225 mm. The wettest month is May, with an average of 807 mm rainfall, and the driest is July, with 341 mm rainfall.

== See also ==
- List of drainage basins of Indonesia
- List of rivers of Indonesia
- List of rivers of Western New Guinea
- Wildeman River Awyu (language)
