= Pulau River =

River of Papua, Indonesia

Pulau River Eilandenrivier
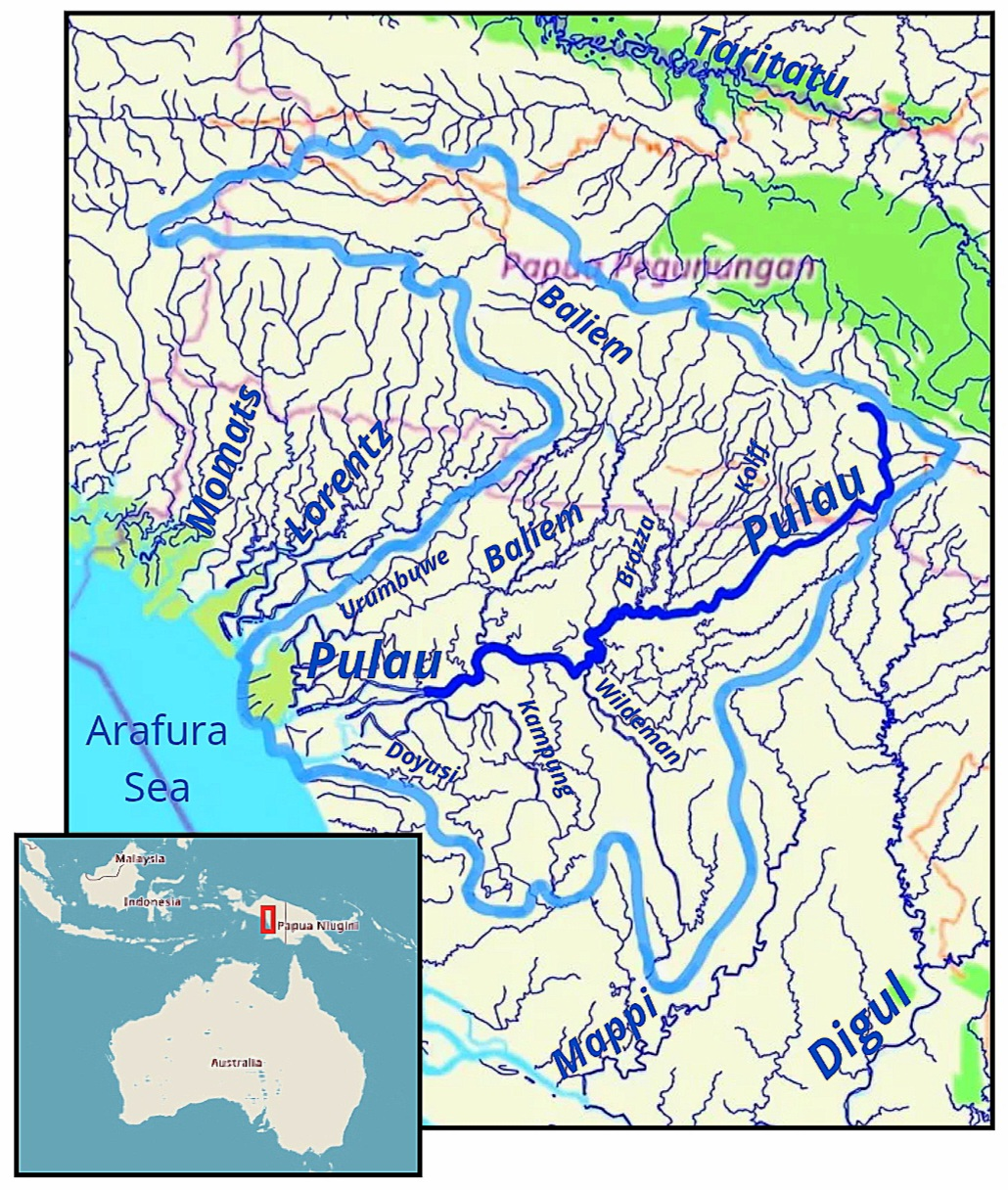
- Eilanden–Pulau River Basin

- Location of river mouth
- Native name: Sungai Pulau (Indonesian); Eilandenrivier (Dutch)

Location
- Country: Indonesia
- Province: South Papua
- Regency: Asmat

Physical characteristics
- Source
  - location: Jayawijaya Mountains, Highland Papua, Indonesia
  - coordinates: 4°38′11.688″S 140°7′47.208″E
  - elevation: 4,000 m (13,000 ft)
- Mouth
  - location: Arafura Sea
  - coordinates: 5°48′44.4204″S 138°9′40.2444″E
  - elevation: 0 m (0 ft)
- Length: 674 km (419 mi)
- Basin size: 37,164 km^{2} (14,349 mi^{2})
- Discharge
  - location: Eilanden Delta
  - average: 3,133 m^{3}/s (110,600 cu ft/s)

Basin features
- Progression: Arafura Sea
- River system: Eilanden River
- Tributaries
  - left: Wildeman, Kampung, Doyusi
  - right: Weehuizen, Kolff, Brazza, Baliem, Urumbuwe

The Pulau River (Indonesian: Sungai Pulau, Dutch: Eilandenrivier) is a major river in South Papua province of Indonesia, with a total length of 674 km (419 mi).

== Name ==
It was previously known as the Eilanden River based on Dutch colonial expedition maps, and was still shown with this name on some government maps in the 2010s.

== Geography ==
The Pulau River has its source in the Jayawijaya Mountains near Puncak Mandala, around 4,000 m (13,000 ft) in elevation. It flows south out of the mountains, and then follows a south-southwesterly course to the Arafura Sea on the Casuarina Coast. Important tributaries include the Baliem (formerly Vriendschaps), Wildeman, Kampung and Brazza.

== Hydrology ==
The river flows in the southern area of Western New Guinea with predominantly a tropical rainforest climate (designated as Af in the Köppen-Geiger climate classification). The annual average temperature in the area is 22 °C (72 °F). The warmest month is January, when the average temperature is around 24 °C (75 °F), and the coldest is June, at 20 °C (68 °F). The average annual rainfall is 3,997–5,547 mm (157.4–218.4 in). The wettest month is May, with an average of 594 mm (23.4 in) rainfall, and the driest is July, with 384 mm (15.1 in) rainfall.

== Discharge ==
Eilanden River discharge
Period	Average discharge	Ref.
Eilanden Delta 5°48′44.4204″S 138°9′40.2444″E
Eilanden with Lorentz at the Delta
	3,783.1 m^{3}/s (133,600 cu ft/s)*	
2002–2011	3,513 m^{3}/s (124,100 cu ft/s)	
2002–2018	107.72197 km^{3}/a (3,413.503 m^{3}/s)	
Eilanden at the delta
2015–2019	2,084 m^{3}/s (73,600 cu ft/s)	
2003–2015	80.4 km^{3}/a (2,550 m^{3}/s)	
2002–2011	3,133 m^{3}/s (110,600 cu ft/s)	

*Monthly flow (Q) m^{3}/s:

Month	Q
JAN	3,294.5
FEB	3,812.8
MAR	3,816.3
APR	3,990.7
MAY	4,380.8
JUN	3,816
JUL	3,022.4
AUG	2,811.9
SEP	3,624
OCT	4,176.9
NOV	4,505.6
DEC	4,144.7
Avg.	3,783.1

== Tributaries ==
Left tributary	Right tributary	Length (km)	Basin size (km^{2})	Average discharge (m^{3}/s)
Eilanden (Pulau)		674	37,164	3,133
	Urumbuwe	240	2,690.5	294.6
Doyusi		200	1,208.4	165.3
Kampung		290	2,133	264.1
	Baliem (Vriends-chaps)	414.2	12,974.1	791.3
Wildeman		330	3,412	327.1
	Brazza	270	2,113.8	120.6
	Kolff		2,755.9	199.1
Weehuizen (Boven Digoel)		110	577.6	68.9

== See also ==
- List of drainage basins of Indonesia
- List of rivers of Oceania
- List of rivers of Indonesia
- List of rivers of Western New Guinea
- Southern New Guinea freshwater swamp forests
- List of rivers by discharge
