= Seremuk River =

Coordinates: 1.5848°S 131.7542°E

Seremuk River Sungai Seremuk, Seremoek-rivier, Soengai Seremoek
- Location of river mouth

Location
- Country: Indonesia

Physical characteristics
- Source
  - location: Southwest Papua
- Length: 66.65 km (41.41 mi)
- Basin size: 524.8 km^{2} (202.6 mi^{2})
- Discharge
  - average: 32.4 m^{3}/s (1,140 cu ft/s)

The Seremuk River is a river in Southwest Papua, Indonesia.

== Geography ==
The river flows in the southern area of Southwest Papua with predominantly tropical rainforest climate (designated as Af in the Köppen-Geiger climate classification). The annual average temperature in the area is 23 °C. The warmest month is December, when the average temperature is around 24 °C, and the coldest is August, at 22 °C. The average annual rainfall is 4797 mm. The wettest month is June, with an average of 662 mm rainfall, and the driest is October, with 225 mm rainfall.

== See also ==
- List of drainage basins of Indonesia
- List of rivers of Indonesia
- List of rivers of Western New Guinea
- Seremuk River languages
- Southern New Guinea freshwater swamp forests
