= Bruce Beehler =

American ornithologist

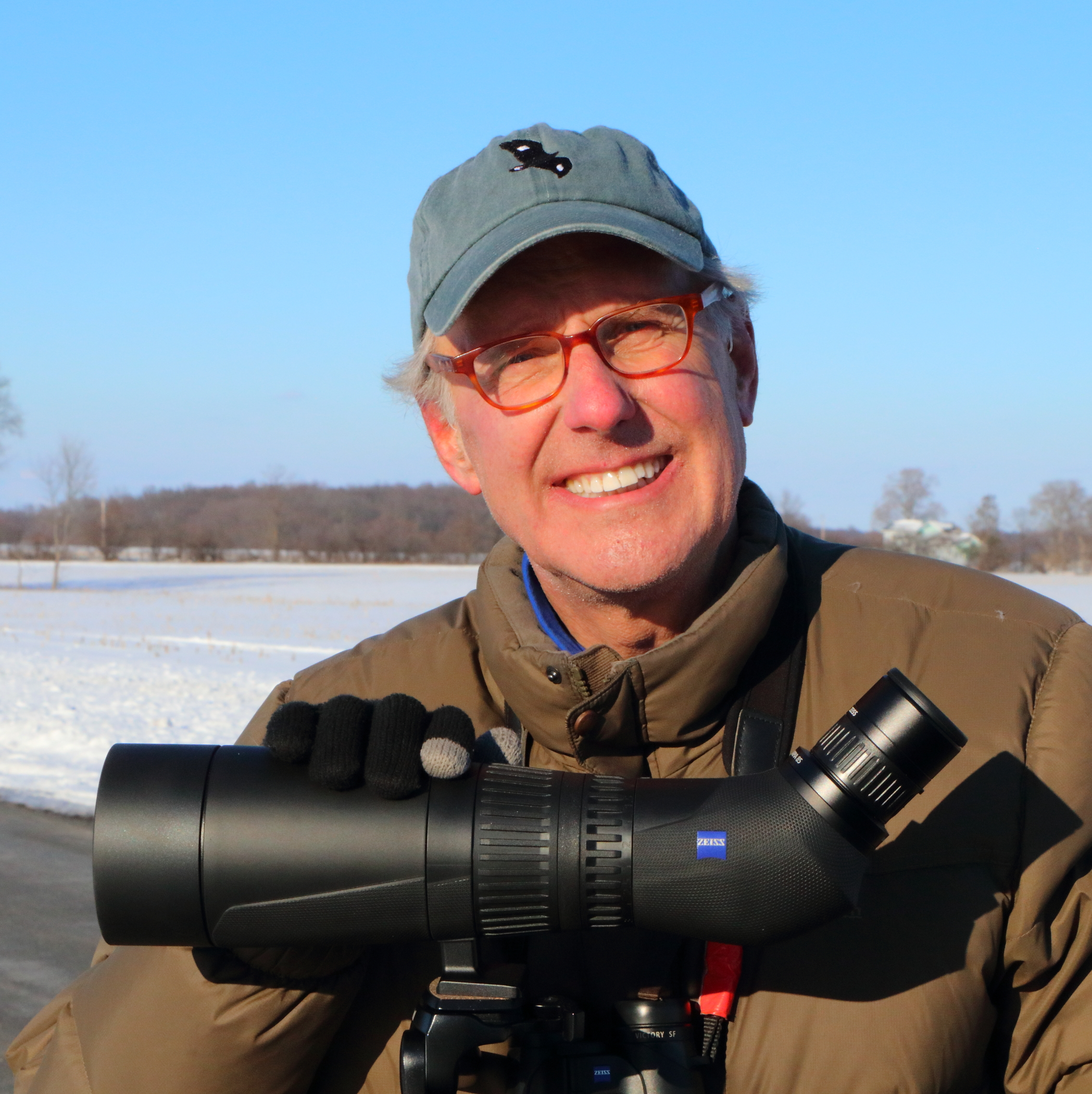
- Born: Bruce McPherson Beehler; October 11, 1951 (age 74); Baltimore
- Education: Williams College, Princeton University
- Occupation: Ornithology
- Writing career
- Genre: non-fiction

Bruce McPherson Beehler (born October 11, 1951, in Baltimore) is an American ornithologist and research associate of the Bird Division of the Smithsonian Institution's National Museum of Natural History. Prior to this appointment, Beehler worked for Conservation International, the Wildlife Conservation Society, Counterpart International, and the National Fish and Wildlife Foundation.

== Life ==
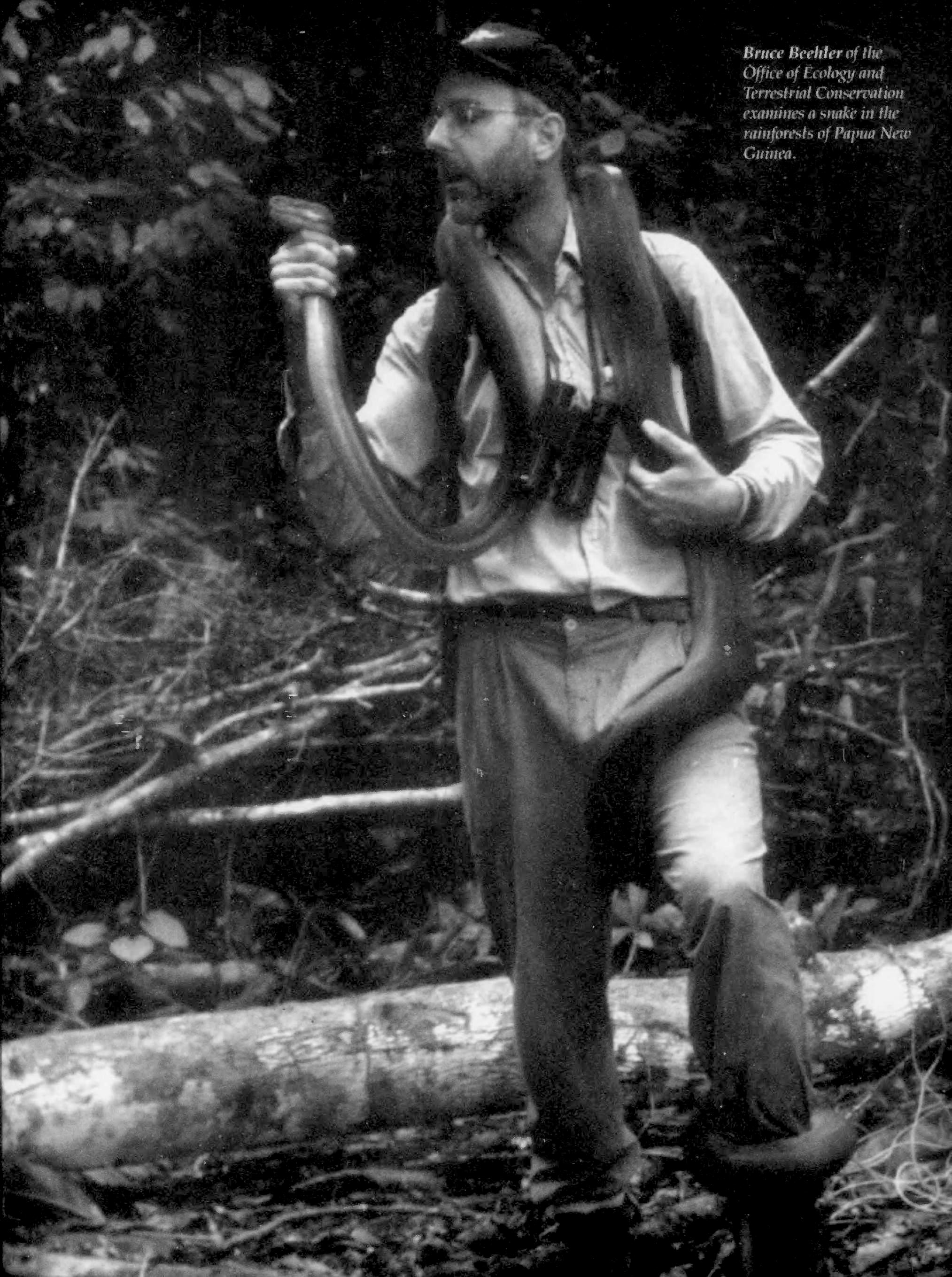
Beehler with a snake in a Papuan rainforest (photo from State Magazine)

Bruce Beehler graduated from Williams College and received his master's degree and PhD studying the behavioral ecology of the birds-of-paradise at Princeton University.

He has been an authority on New Guinea birds for several decades, having authored or co-authored several major works on the biodiversity this, the largest tropical island, including The Birds of Paradise (1998), The Birds of New Guinea (1986, 2015) and the two-volume Ecology of Papua (2007).

To the general public, Beehler is best known for having co-led a widely published rapid assessment survey on biological diversity in 2005 to the Foja Mountains, Papua, where he, together with an international team of 11 scientists, the majority from the Indonesian Institute of Sciences (LIPI), made a number of scientific discoveries.

The findings on this survey expanded on previous research conducted in the region by Dr. Jared Diamond in the late 1970s and early 1980s. Beehler and colleagues, however, returned with the first ever photographs of two species of birds, the bronze parotia (Parotia berlepschi) and the golden-fronted bowerbird (Amblyornis flavifrons), that previously were known only from a few specimens. Additionally, a previously unknown species of honeyeater was discovered, it being scientifically described in 2007 as the wattled smoky honeyeater (Melipotes carolae). The specific epithet, carolae, commemorates Carol Beehler, the wife of Bruce Beehler. Together with a team from 60 Minutes, Beehler returned to the Foja Mountains in 2007, resulting in the first ever filming of several of the species discovered in 2005, as well as encounters with an undescribed giant rat (Mallomys sp.) and a tiny pygmy possum (Cercartetus sp.).

== Works ==
- Thane K Pratt; Bruce McP Beehler "Birds of New Guinea, second edition, Princeton, NJ : Princeton University Press, 2015. ISBN 9780691095622
- Birdlife of the Adirondack Park, Glens Falls, NY : Adirondack Mountain Club, 1978.
- Upland birds of northeastern New Guinea, Wau, Papua New Guinea : Wau Ecology Institute, 1978.
- A naturalist in New Guinea, Austin, Texas : University of Texas Press, 1991. ISBN 9780292755413
- New Guinea : nature and culture of the world's grandest island, Princeton, NJ : Princeton University Press, 2020. ISBN 9780691180304
- North on the wing : travels with the songbird migration of spring, Washington, DC : Smithsonian Books, 2018. ISBN 9781588346131
- Lost worlds : adventures in the tropical rainforest, New Haven, Conn.; London : Yale University Press, 2009. ISBN 9780300158335, OCLC 317471890
- Bruce McP Beehler; Thane K Pratt; Mary Lecroy Birds of New Guinea: Distribution, Taxonomy, and Systematics. Princeton, New Jersey : Princeton University Press, 2016. ISBN 9780691164243, OCLC 919479531
- Bruce McP Beehler; John Anderton, Natural encounters : biking, hiking, and birding through the seasons, New Haven : Yale University Press, 2019. ISBN 9780300243482, OCLC 1055264404
