= Tabai River =

River in Indonesia

Coordinates: 3.01667°S 135.86667°E

Tabai River Sungai Tabai, Wai Tabai, Tabai-rivier
- Location of river mouth Tabai River (Indonesia)

Location
- Country: Indonesia

Physical characteristics
- Source
  - location: Central Papua
- Mouth
  - location: Nabire Regency

The Tabai River is a river in Central Papua, Indonesia.

== Geography ==
The river flows in the northern area of Papua with predominantly tropical rainforest climate (designated as Af in the Köppen-Geiger climate classification). The annual average temperature in the area is 22 °C. The warmest month is August, when the average temperature is around 24 °C, and the coldest is September, at 20 °C. The average annual rainfall is 5543 mm. The wettest month is April, with an average of 550 mm rainfall, and the driest is January, with 263 mm rainfall.

== See also ==
- List of drainage basins of Indonesia
- List of rivers of Indonesia
- List of rivers of Western New Guinea
