= Wowei River =

Coordinates: 0.42851°S 132.16806°E

Wowei River Sungai Wowei, Wawe, Sungai Wewe, Wewe River
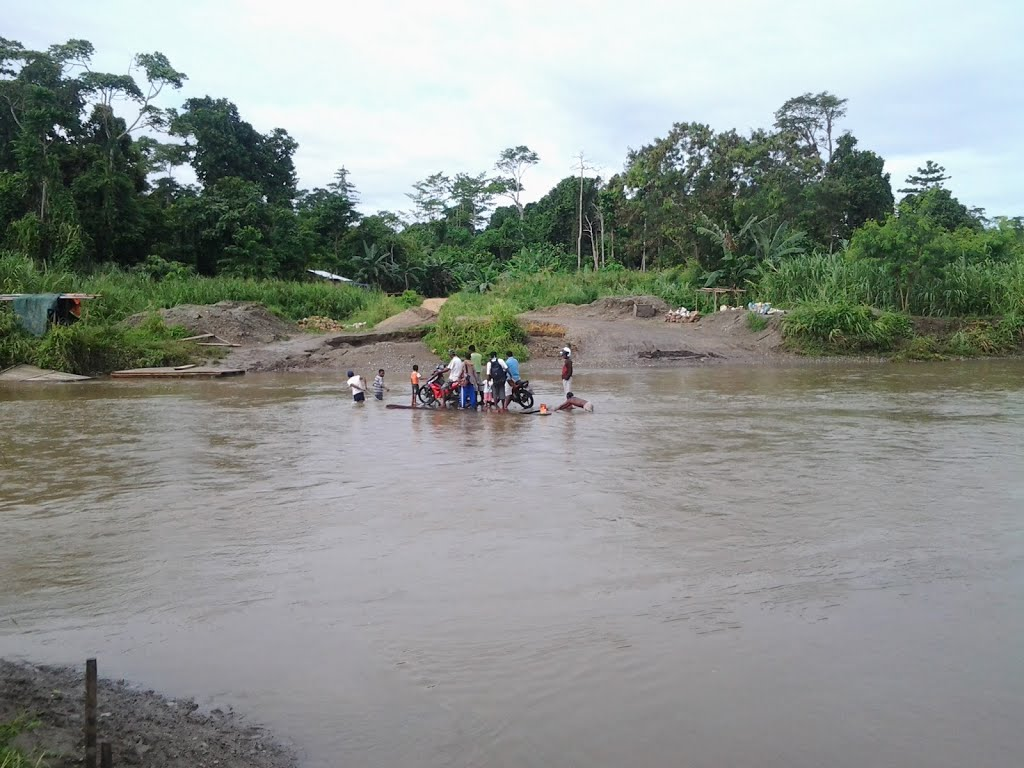
- Wowei River in Tambrauw (Year,2012)

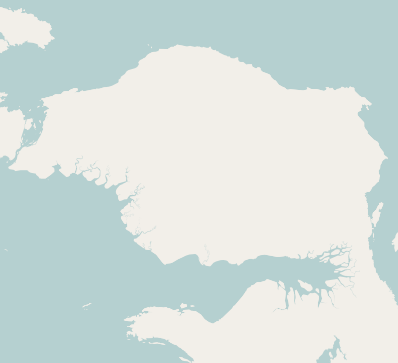
- Location in Bird's Head Peninsula Location in Indonesia

Location
- Country: Indonesia

Physical characteristics
- Source
  - location: Southwest Papua
- Mouth: Pacific Ocean
  - location: Tambrauw Regency
- Length: 29.23 km (18.16 mi)
- Basin size: 267.5 km^{2} (103.3 mi^{2})
- Discharge
  - average: 33.113 m^{3}/s (1,169.4 cu ft/s)

The Wowei River (also Wewe or Wawe) is a river in northern Southwest Papua, Indonesia. It flows in the Tambrauw Regency and discharges into the Pacific Ocean.

== Geography ==
The river flows in the southern area of Southwest Papua with predominantly tropical rainforest climate (designated as Af in the Köppen-Geiger climate classification). The annual average temperature in the area is 22 °C. The warmest month is August, when the average temperature is around 24 °C, and the coldest is January, at 20 °C. The average annual rainfall is 3322 mm.. The wettest month is June, with an average of 381 mm rainfall, and the driest is October, with 153 mm rainfall.

Wowei River

Climate chart (precipitation, max. and min. temperature)
J	F	M	A	M	J	J	A	S	O	N	D
282 22 19	226 23 20	242 22 20	247 24 20	297 24 21	381 25 21	327 24 21	328 26 21	228 24 22	153 26 21	311 25 21	299 23 20
- █ Average max. and min. temperatures in °C
- █ Precipitation totals in mm
Imperial conversion
J	F	M	A	M	J	J	A	S	O	N	D
11 72 66	8.9 73 68	9.5 72 68	9.7 75 68	12 75 70	15 77 70	13 75 70	13 79 70	9 75 72	6 79 70	12 77 70	12 73 68
- █ Average max. and min. temperatures in °F
- █ Precipitation totals in inches

== See also ==
- List of drainage basins of Indonesia
- List of rivers of Indonesia
- List of rivers of Western New Guinea
