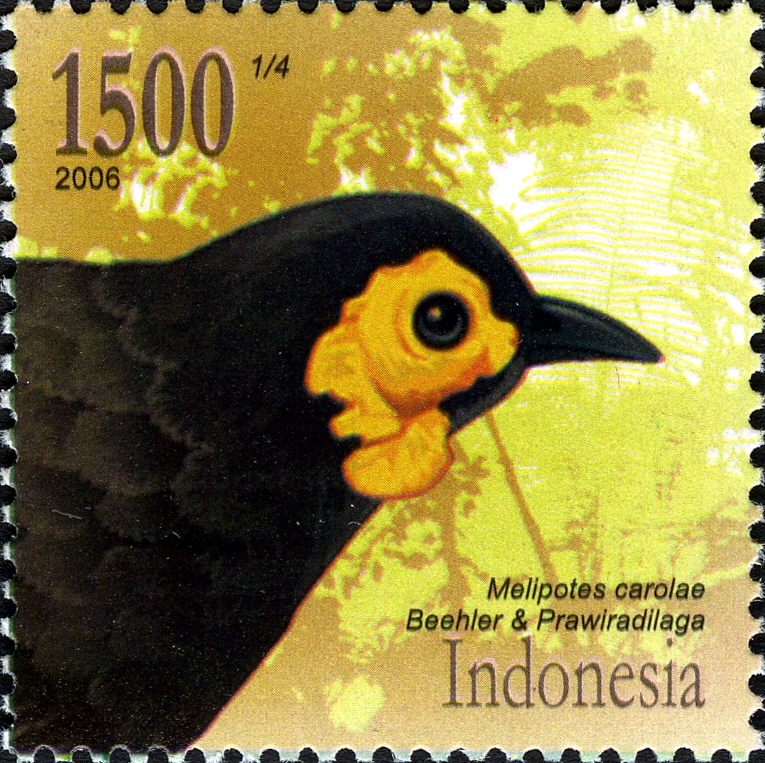

Conservation status
- Least Concern (IUCN 3.1)

Scientific classification
- Kingdom: Animalia
- Phylum: Chordata
- Class: Aves
- Order: Passeriformes
- Family: Meliphagidae
- Genus: Melipotes
- Species: M. carolae

Binomial name
- Melipotes carolae Beehler et al., 2007

= Wattled smoky honeyeater =

Species of bird

The wattled smoky honeyeater or Foja honeyeater (Melipotes carolae) is a species of honeyeater with a sooty-grey plumage and a black bill. The most distinctive feature is arguably the extensive reddish-orange facial skin and pendulous wattle. In other members of the genus Melipotes, these sections only appear reddish when "flushed" and the wattle is smaller.

An Indonesian endemic, this honeyeater was discovered in December 2005. It is found in remote montane forests of Foja Mountains range, Western New Guinea at an altitude over 1,150 metres.

The first bird species found in New Guinea since 1939, the honeyeater was one of over twenty new species discovered by an international team of eleven scientists from Australia, Indonesia and the United States, led by an American ornithologist and Melanesia Conservation International vice-president Bruce Beehler.

The bird is named after the wife of Bruce Beehler, Carol Beehler.
