= Bewani River =

River in Papua, Indonesia

- Location within Papua

Location
- Country: Indonesia
- Region: Papua

Physical characteristics
- Source
  - location: Indonesia
- Mouth
  - coordinates: 2.8319°S 140.8062°E

The Bewani River is a river in Western New Guinea, Indonesia.

== See also ==
- List of drainage basins of Indonesia
- List of rivers of Western New Guinea
