= Brazza River =

River in Indonesia

Coordinates: 5.33489°S 139.40652°E

Brazza River Sungai Brazza, A-rivier, Braza-rivier, Braxxa, Brazzard Rivier, Brazza River, Sungai Bratta, Brazza, A. of Brazza-rivier
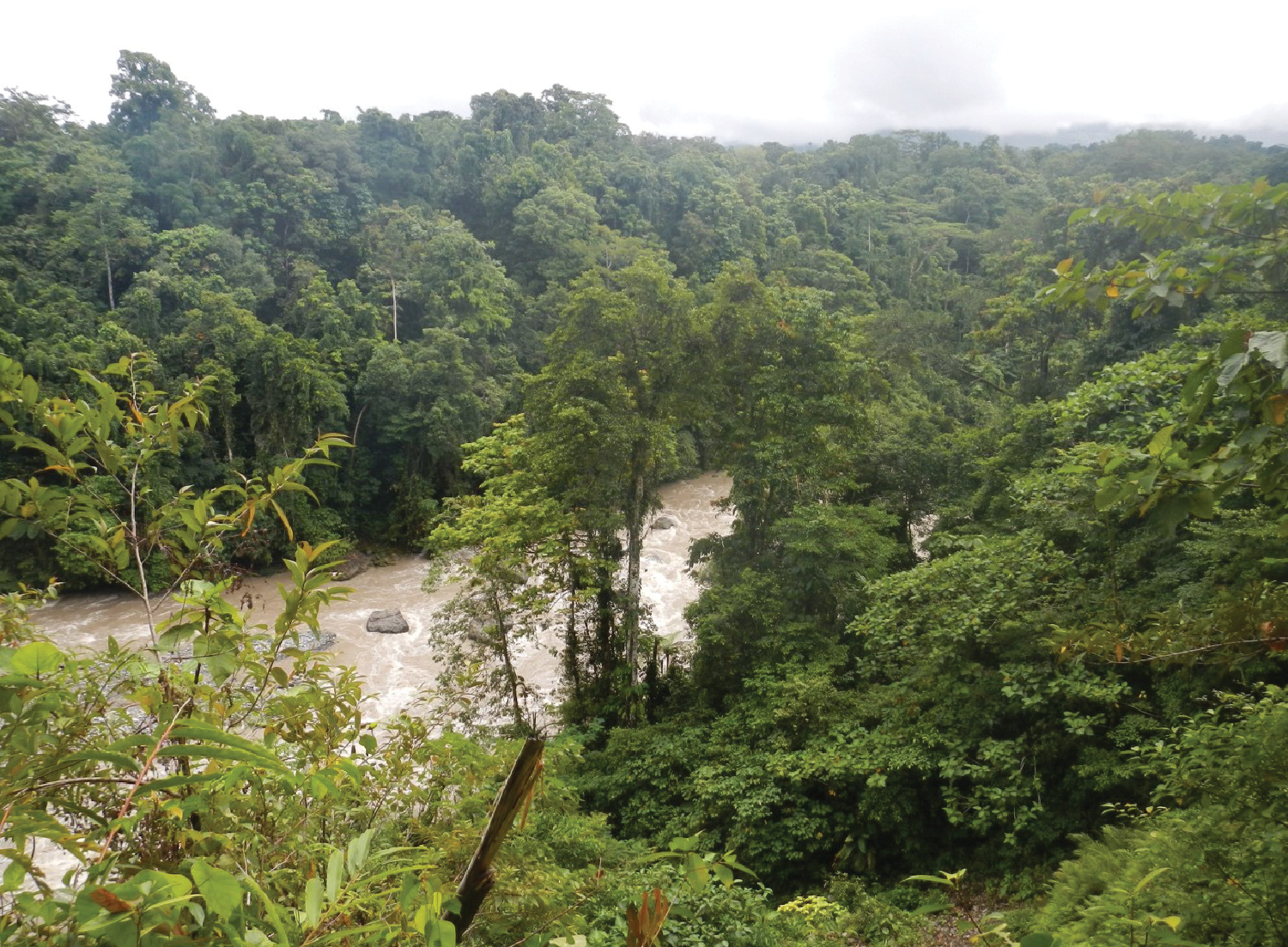

- Location of river mouth Brazza River (Indonesia)

Location
- Country: Indonesia
- Province: Papua

Physical characteristics
- Source
  - location: Maoke Mountains, Indonesia
- Mouth: Pulau River
  - location: Indonesia

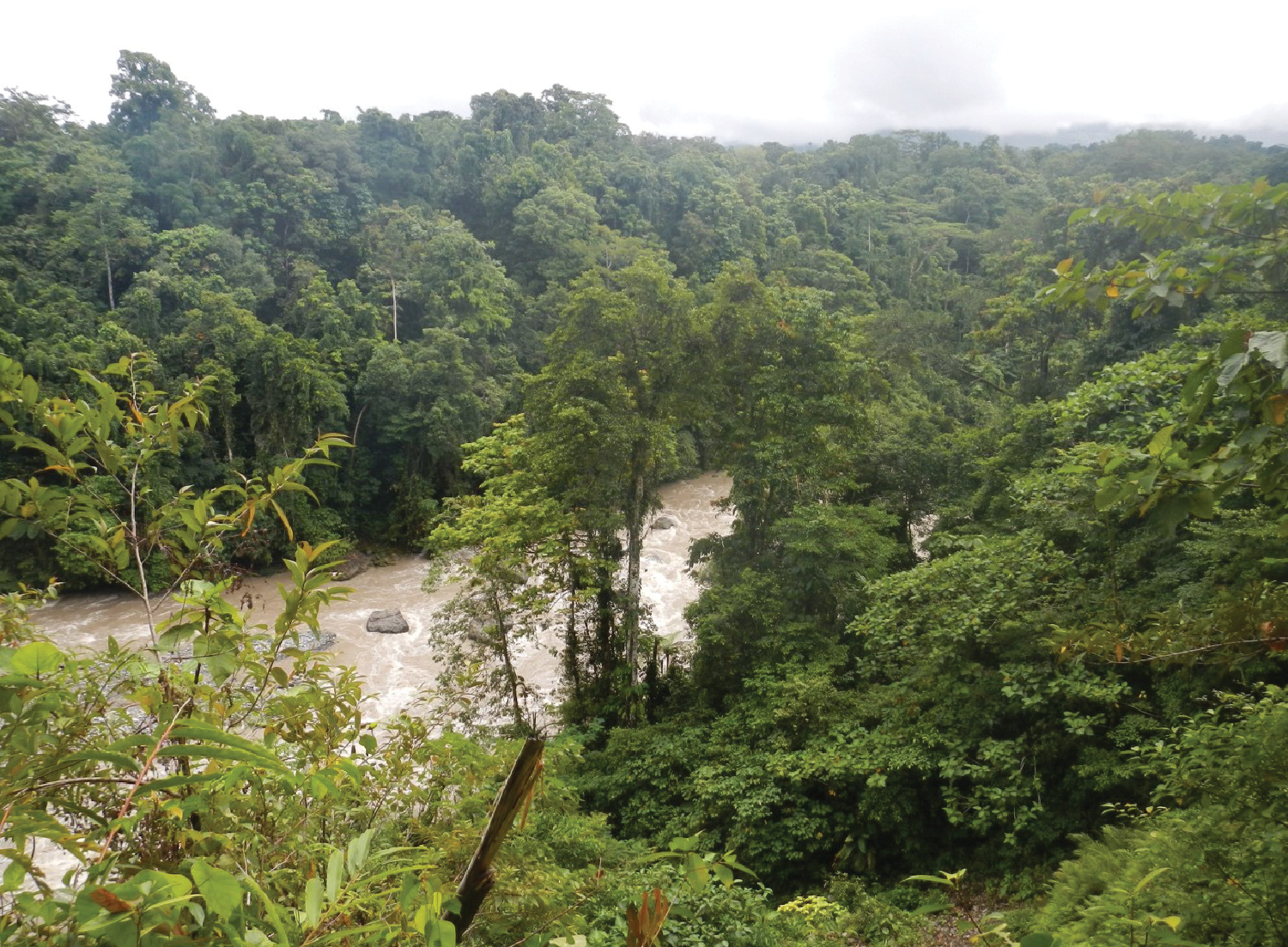
Brazza River

The Brazza River is a river in Papua province, Indonesia. The Brazza River has its source at over 3000 meters of elevation in the Jayawijaya or Maoke Mountains of central Papua in Yahukimo Regency and flows south to the lowland rainforests of Asmat Regency before meeting the Pulau River (or Eilanden River.), which flows southeast to the Arafura Sea.

== History ==
The Brazza watershed is known to be the residence of the Asmat tribe, specifically the Brazza tribe, one of the Asmat sub-tribes as well as the Citak tribe, which is recorded to inhabit the area of Citak Mitak (Senggo) Subdistrict along this river. Asmat people live in southern Papua, around the big rivers of Aswets, Bets, Pomats, Undir, Sirets, and Brazza, all of which flow to the Arafuru Sea (formerly: Irian Bay). The rivers can be navigated far inland, up to about 50 km when the tide rises. Because it was watered by many rivers, the land became very large swamps, which were not useful for agriculture and caused the Asmat people to be isolated for a long time. However, in this place, they can get enough food, especially from sago trees that grow wild and abundantly everywhere, as well as game animals, such as wild boar, cassowary, cuscus, various kinds of birds, and various kinds of fish and shrimp in the river. Asmat people establish settlements and villages on the banks of the river, because the river is the most important means of transportation, and makes it easy to detect the arrival of other people who approach their village. Asmat people can divided into several sub-ethnic groups, including Unisirau, Bismam, Simai, Emari-Ducur, Betch-Mbup, Kaimo, Safan, Brazza, and Joerat.

In the upstream of the Brazza River, to the west of the upstream Digul River, lived the Citak tribe, to the east of the Asmat tribe, and the north of the Awyu people. Their language has similarities with the Asmat language, so some scholars tend to classify them as one of the Asmat sub-tribes. Another tribe, the Korowai, also inhabits the upstream of the Brazza River in the south Jayawijaya Mountains, to the northeast of the Asmat tribe, to the west of Senggo. This area is part of the Kouh and Citak Mitak (Senggo) Districts in Merauke Regency.

The boundaries of the Asmat tribe with other inland tribes such as the Kombai, Korowai, Citak, and others are marked by the Brazza River and the foot of the Central Mountains.

The Asmat Brazza tribe, which lives on the banks of the Brazza River at the foot of the Jayawijaya Mountains, is famous for its 'mbis' sculpture, in which the 'mbis' head is uniquely made separate from the body that makes the art of this tribal craft different and highly valuable.

== Modern development ==
Dekai, the capital of Yahukimo Regency, is a new town built in 2008 on the east bank of the Brazza River. Nop Goliat Dekai Airport is immediately southeast of the Brazza River, on the north side of Dekai. To the south of town, a river port, Longpon, at the border of Yahukimo and Asmat regencies, provides cargo service for the Dekai district and villages near the Brazza River.

Brazza River in Papua, Indonesia.

In the mountains, the Brazza River flows past the villages of the Kimyal people near Sela, where it is known as the Thay River. The Momuna people live in Sumo and Dekai districts on both sides of the Brazza River in the lowland rainforest to the south. South of the Momuna, the Asmat people, known for their wood carvings and bark paintings, live along the lower reaches of the Brazza River

== Geography ==
The river flows in the southern area of Papua with a predominantly tropical rainforest climate (designated as Af in the Köppen-Geiger climate classification). The annual average temperature in the area is 21 °C. The warmest month is February when the average temperature is around 24 °C, and the coldest is June, at 18 °C. The average annual rainfall is 6178 mm. The wettest month is May, with an average of 721 mm rainfall, and the driest is July, with 432 mm rainfall.

== See also ==
- List of drainage basins of Indonesia
