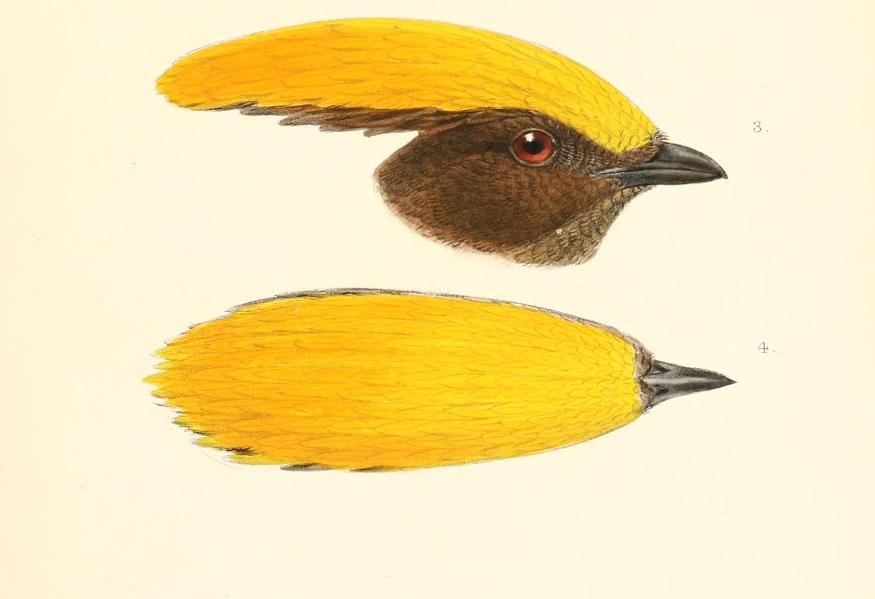
- Head profile and top of head of the male

Conservation status
- Least Concern (IUCN 3.1)

Scientific classification
- Kingdom: Animalia
- Phylum: Chordata
- Class: Aves
- Order: Passeriformes
- Family: Ptilonorhynchidae
- Genus: Amblyornis
- Species: A. flavifrons

Binomial name
- Amblyornis flavifrons Rothschild, 1895

= Golden-fronted bowerbird =

Species of bird

The golden-fronted bowerbird (Amblyornis flavifrons) is a medium-sized, approximately 24 cm long, brown bowerbird that is endemic to the Foja Mountains in New Guinea. The male is rufous brown with an elongated golden crest extending from its golden forehead, dark grey feet and buffish yellow underparts. The female is an unadorned olive brown bird.

An Indonesian endemic, the male builds a tower-like "maypole-type" bower decorated with colored fruit.

Originally described in 1895 based on trade skins, this elusive bird remained a mystery for nearly a hundred years, until 31 January 1981 when the American ornithologist Jared Diamond discovered the home ground of the golden-fronted bowerbird at the Foja Mountains in the Papua province of Indonesia.

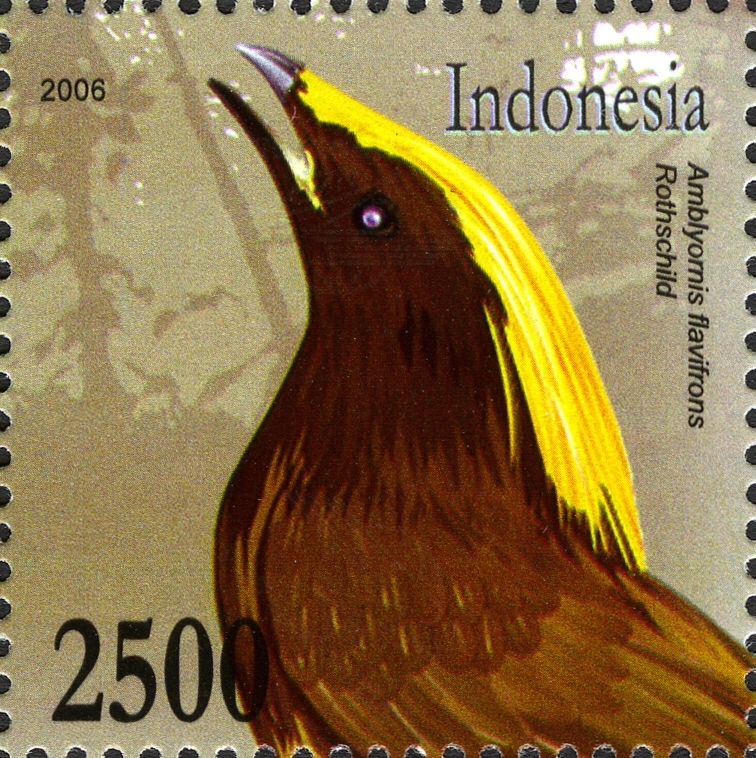

In December 2005, an international team of eleven scientists from the United States, Australia and Indonesia led by Bruce Beehler traveled to the unexplored areas of Foja Mountains and took the first photographs of the bird.
