= Sobger River =

Coordinates: 3.728°S 140.3134°E

- Location of river mouth Sobger River (Indonesia)

Location
- Country: Indonesia

Physical characteristics
- Source
  - location: Western Papua
- Mouth
  - location: Taritatu River
- Length: 188.861 km (117.353 mi)

The Sobger River is a river in northern New Guinea, province of Papua, Indonesia. It is a tributary of the Taritatu River, The total length is 188.861 km. which it forms by merging with the Nawa River.

== Geography ==
The river flows in the northern area of Papua with predominantly tropical rainforest climate (designated as Af in the Köppen-Geiger climate classification). The annual average temperature in the area is 21 °C. The warmest month is April, when the average temperature is around 22 °C, and the coldest is January, at 20 °C. The average annual rainfall is 4839 mm. The wettest month is January, with an average of 579 mm rainfall, and the driest is July, with 205 mm rainfall.

== See also ==
- List of drainage basins of Indonesia
- List of rivers of Indonesia
- List of rivers of Western New Guinea
