= Songgato River =

River in Indonesia

Coordinates: 3.4772°S 140.4013°E

Songgato River Keerom River, Sungai Keerom, Songgolo River, Sungai Songgato, Songgote Rivier, Songgoto River, Umkehr Creek
- Location of river mouth Songgato River (Indonesia)

Location
- Country: Indonesia

Physical characteristics
- Source
  - location: Western Papua
- Mouth
  - location: Taritatu River
  - elevation: 232 m (761 ft)
- Length: 131.2 km (81.5 mi)

The Songgato River (or Keerom River) is a river in northern Western Papua, Papua province, Indonesia. It is a tributary of the Taritatu River. The total length is 131.2 km.

== Geography ==
The river flows in the northern area of Papua with predominantly tropical rainforest climate (designated as Af in the Köppen-Geiger climate classification). The annual average temperature in the area is 21 °C. The warmest month is January, when the average temperature is around 22 °C, and the coldest is July, at 20 °C. The average annual rainfall is 4839 mm. The wettest month is January, with an average of 579 mm rainfall, and the driest is July, with 205 mm rainfall.

== See also ==
- List of drainage basins of Indonesia
- List of rivers of Indonesia
- List of rivers of Western New Guinea
