= Foja Mountains =

Mountain range in Indonesia

Coordinates: 2°36′S 139°05′E

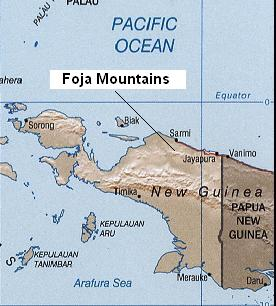
The Foja Mountains west of the port city of Jayapura, the capital of Papua province.

The Foja Mountains (Foja Range, Foya Mountains) (Indonesian: Pegunungan Foja) are located just north of the Mamberamo river basin in Papua, Indonesia. The mountains rise to 2,193 metres (7,195 ft), and have 3,000 square kilometers of old growth tropical rainforest in the interior part of the range. The Foja forest tract covers 9,712 square kilometers and is the largest tropical forest without roads in the Asia Pacific region.

The Foja Range languages are spoken within the mountain range and nearby areas.

== Geography ==
The Foja Mountains are cooler than the lowlands below because of their elevation, but January and July temperatures still average 20 to 30 °C (68 to 86 °F). The rainy season is from December to March, but the area can receive rain throughout the year. In a typical year, the range receives more than 2,032 mm (80.0 in) of precipitation. Relative humidity ranges from 73 to 87%. The nearest villages include Sragafareh, Jomen, Beggensabah, Aer Mati, and Dabra.

== History ==
The mountains have no record of visitors prior to 1979 (Stattersfield et al. 1998). Much of the area around the Foja Mountains and nearby Van Rees Mountains are too steep for conventional logging, and are considered unsafe due to their inaccessibility. Some atlases show only the Gauttier Mountains in the area, but the Foja Mountains lie at the eastern edge of that range at about 139° east longitude.

== Ecology ==
The portion of the mountains above 1000 meters elevation is in the Northern New Guinea montane rain forests ecoregion. The montane forests are dominated by Araucaria cunninghamii, Podocarpus idenburgensis, Agathis labillardierei, Calophyllum, and Palaquium at the 1,200 meter level.

The mountains are within the Mamberamo-Foja Wildlife Reserve.

=== Ecological discovery ===
==== 2005 ====
In December 2005, scientists from the United States, Indonesia, and Australia spent a month in the Foja Range documenting flora and fauna from the lower hills to near the summit of the range. The expedition team was co-led by Bruce Beehler and Stephen Richards and included scientists from the Indonesian Institute of Sciences, Cenderawasih University, the Smithsonian Institution, Conservation International and other institutions. In February 2006, the expedition team released details of new species including:

- One bird, a honeyeater with scarlet wattles, officially described in 2007 as the wattled smoky honeyeater (Melipotes carolae).
- 20 frogs
- Four butterflies
- Five palms
- A rhododendron with a white, scented flower across the NeverPeack Mountains

The scientists documented:

- The first photographs of Berlepsch's six-wired bird of paradise and the golden-fronted bowerbird, both of which were only known from a minute number of trade skins previously.
- A golden-mantled tree-kangaroo (Dendrolagus pulcherrimus), believed to be near-extinct.
- Western long-beaked echidnas that allowed scientists to pick them up, evidence that the area has had no human presence

The human population of the Foja Range is 300, living in the 7,500 square kilometers of low-lying forest. The 3,000 square kilometers of mountainous jungle appear to have been untouched by humans until the 2006 scientific expedition. There are no roads in the mountains, so scientists had to travel by helicopter, landing on a boggy lakebed. Six permits were needed before the 11-member team could legally enter.

==== 2007 ====
In December 2007, a second scientific expedition was taken to the mountain range. The expedition led to the discovery of two new species: the first being a 1.4 kg giant rat (Mallomys sp.) approximately five times the size of a regular brown rat, the second a pygmy possum (Cercartetus sp.) described by scientists as "one of the world's smallest marsupials."

==== 2008 ====
An expedition late in 2008, backed by the Indonesian Institute of Sciences, National Geographic Society and Smithsonian Institution, was made in order to assess the area's biodiversity. New types of animals recorded include a frog with a long erectile nose, a large woolly rat, an imperial-pigeon with rust, grey and white plumage, a 25 cm gecko with claws rather than pads on its toes, and a small, 30 cm high, black forest wallaby (a member of the genus Dorcopsis).
