= Tariku River =

River in Indonesia

Coordinates: 2.9232°S 138.4422°E

Tariku River Sungai Tariku, Rauffer, Nogolo, Rouffaer-rivier, Toearal, Rauffaer Rivier, Tarikoe Rivier, Toearai River, Tariku, Van der Willigen-rivier, Willigen-rivier
- Location within Papua (province)

Location
- Country: Indonesia

Physical characteristics
- Source
  - location: Western Papua
- Mouth
  - location: Mamberamo River
- Length: 488 km (303 mi)

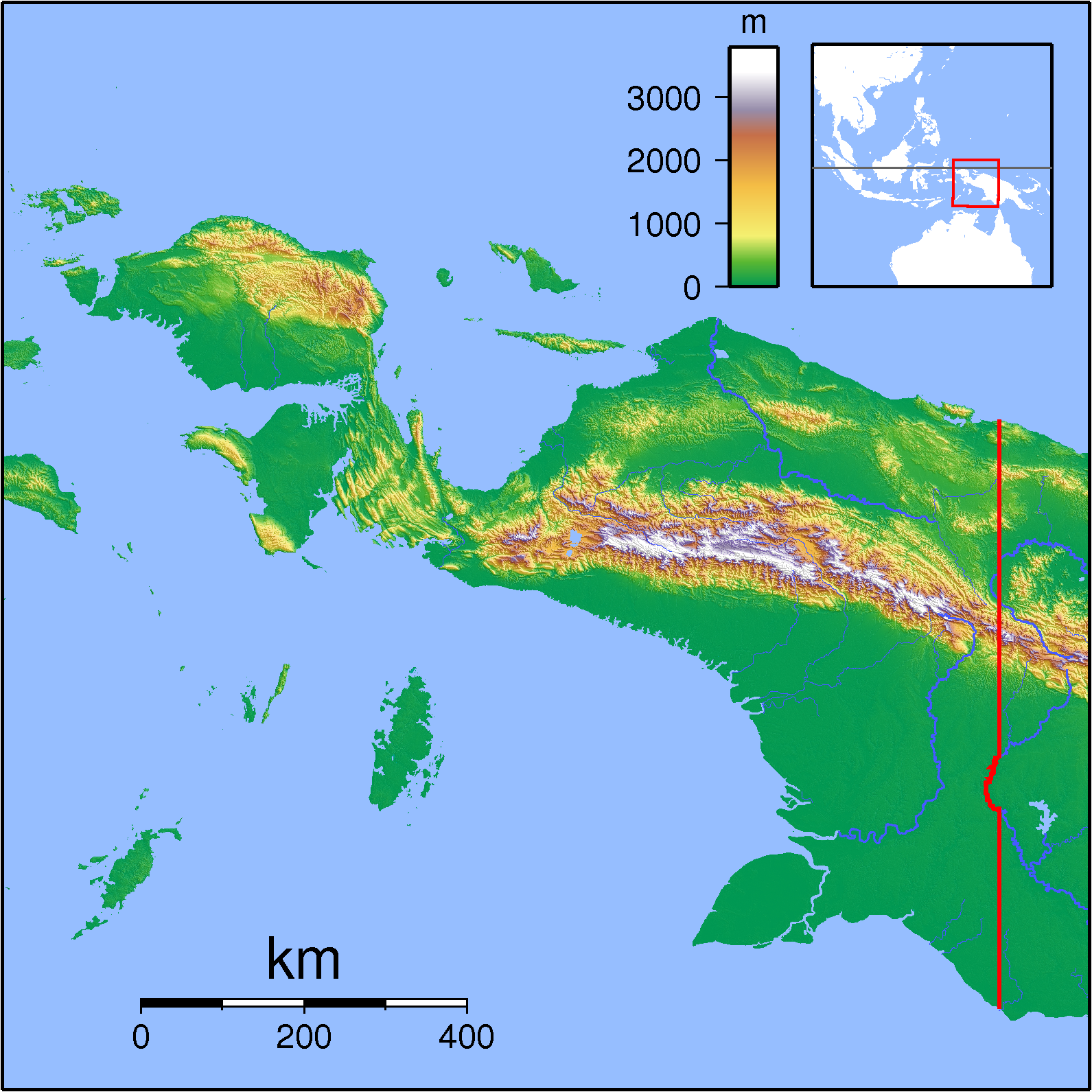
Topographic locator map for Papua

The Tariku or Rouffaer River is a river in the northern part of the Indonesian province of Papua. It is one of the major tributary of Mamberamo River with a total length of 488 km (303 mi).

== Name ==
During the Dutch colonial era it was known as the Rouffaer River.

== Hydrology ==
The Tariku River flows generally eastward in the basin north of the island's central mountainous cordillera. Eventually it meets the Taritatu River, and at this confluence the two rivers become the Mamberamo River, one of the largest rivers on the island of New Guinea (Papua).

== Geography ==
The river flows in the northern area of Papua with predominantly tropical rainforest climate (designated as Af in the Köppen-Geiger climate classification). The annual average temperature in the area is 22 °C. The warmest month is October, when the average temperature is around 23 °C, and the coldest is March, at 21 °C. The average annual rainfall is 4269 mm. The wettest month is April, with an average of 487 mm rainfall, and the driest is July, with 278 mm rainfall.

== See also ==
- List of drainage basins of Indonesia
- List of rivers of Indonesia
- List of rivers of Western New Guinea
- Tariku River languages
