= Taritatu River =

Coordinates: 2.9232°S 138.4422°E

Taritatu River Sungai Taritatu, Idenburg-rivier, Tari Taloe, Taritatoe, Tari Talu
- Location within Papua (province) Location within Indonesia

Location
- Country: Indonesia

Physical characteristics
- Source
  - location: Western Papua
- Mouth
  - location: Mamberamo River
- Length: 808 km (502 mi)
- Basin size: 47,872.9 km^{2} (18,483.8 mi^{2})
- Discharge
  - location: Atuoi, Indonesia (Basin size: 32,421 km^{2} (12,518 sq mi)
  - average: (Period of data: 2003-2009)1,658 m^{3}/s (58,600 cu ft/s)

Basin features
- Tributaries
  - left: Waruta
  - right: Songgat, Sobger, Van de Wal

The Taritatu or Idenburg River, also called Baliem River, is a river in the northern part of the Indonesian province of Papua. It is the largest tributary of Mamberamo River with a total length of 808 km (502 mi).

== Name ==
During the Dutch colonial era it was known as the Idenburg River.

== Hydrology ==
The Taritatu River flows generally westward in the basin north of the island's central mountainous cordillera. The Sobger River is the major tributary. Eventually it meets the Tariku River, and at this confluence the two rivers become the Mamberamo River, one of the largest rivers on the island of New Guinea (Papua). The total length is 266.176 km.

== Geography ==
The river flows in the northern area of Papua with predominantly tropical rainforest climate (designated as Af in the Köppen-Geiger climate classification). The annual average temperature in the area is 22 °C. The warmest month is October, when the average temperature is around 23 °C, and the coldest is March, at 21 °C. The average annual rainfall is 4269 mm. The wettest month is April, with an average of 487 mm rainfall, and the driest is July, with 278 mm rainfall.

== See also ==
- List of drainage basins of Indonesia
- List of rivers of Indonesia
- List of rivers of Western New Guinea
