= List of rivers of Mato Grosso =

List of rivers in Mato Grosso (Brazilian State).

The list is arranged by drainage basin, with respective tributaries indented under each larger stream's name and ordered from downstream to upstream. Mato Grosso is divided by those streams that flow north to the Amazon and east to the Tocontins rivers and those that flow south to the Paraná river. All rivers in Mato Grosso ultimately drain to the Atlantic Ocean.

== By Drainage Basin ==
=== Amazon Basin ===
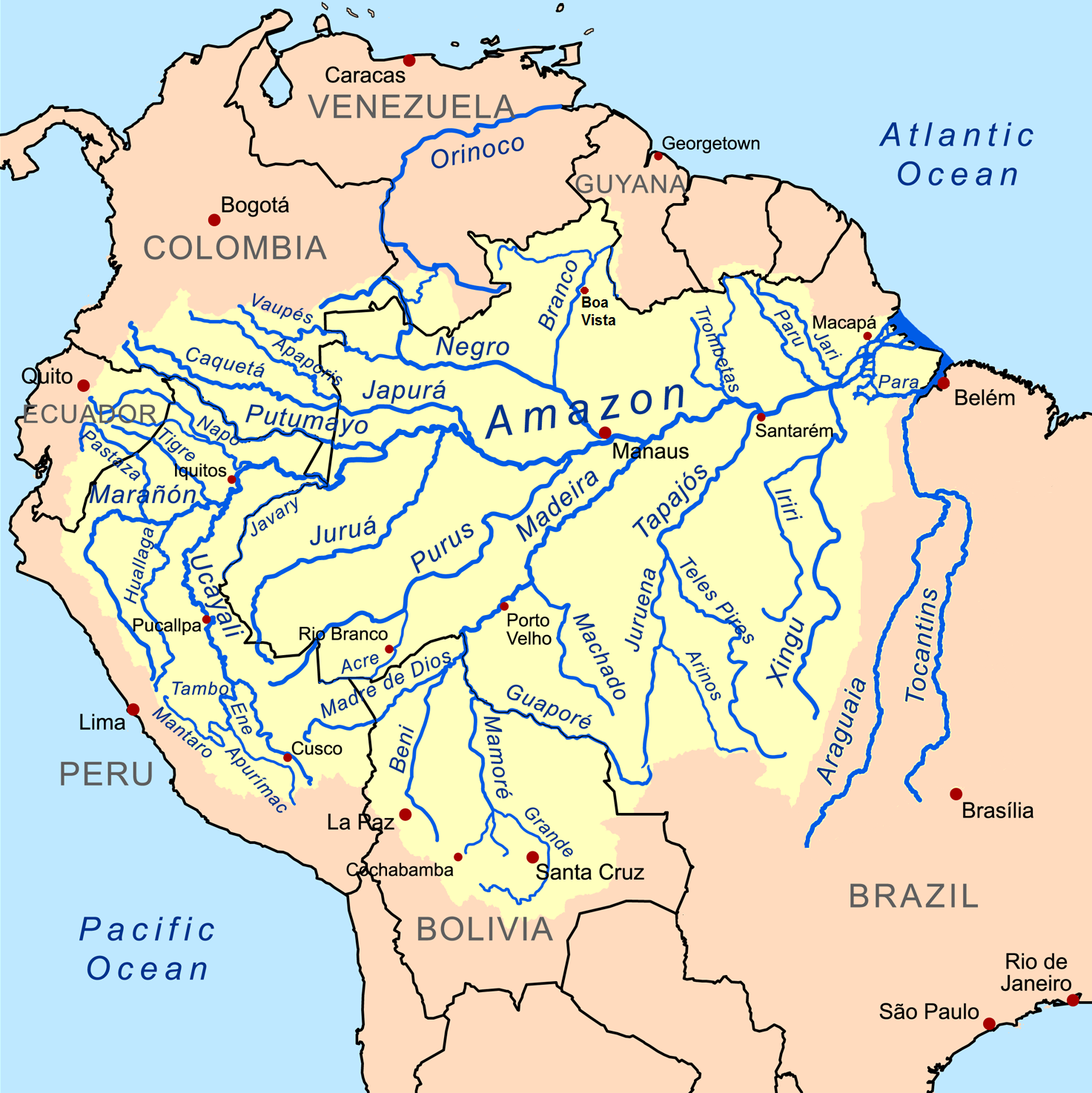
Amazon River basin

- Amazon River (Pará, Amazonas)
  - Xingu River
    - Iriri River
      - Iriri Novo River
    - Ribeirão da Paz
    - Liberdade River
    - Auaiá-Miçu River
    - Huaiá-Miçu River
    - Arraias River
      - Manissauá-Miçu River
        - Azul River
    - Suia-Miçu River
    - Atelchu River
      - Ronuro River
        - Jabotá River
      - Ferro River
    - Tamitatoale River
    - Ribeirão Auila
    - Curisevo River
      - Kevuaieli River
      - Pacuneiro River
    - Sete de Setembro River
    - Culuene River
      - Couto de Magalhães River
  - Tapajós River (Pará)
    - Teles Pires River
      - Apiacá River
      - Paranaíta River
      - Cristalino River
      - Peixoto de Azevedo River
      - Parado River
      - Verde River
    - Juruena River
      - São Tomé River
      - São João da Barra River
      - Arinos River
        - Dos Peixes River
        - São Venceslau River
        - Parecis River
        - Sumidouro Grande River
        - Dos Patos River
      - Vermelho River
      - Do Sangue River
        - Crauari River
        - Membeca River
        - Sacuriuiná River
      - Juína-Mirim River
      - Papagaio River
        - Sauêruiná River
        - Buriti River
        - Sacre River
          - Verde River
      - Camararé River
        - Camarazinho River
      - Juína River
        - Formiga River
        - Juininha River
  - Canumã River (Amazonas)
    - Sucunduri River
  - Madeira River (Amazonas)
    - Aripuanã River
      - Roosevelt River
        - Flor do Prado River
        - Madeirinha River
        - Branco River
        - Da Jacutinga River
        - Capitão Cardoso River
          - Tenente Marques River
      - Guaribe River
      - Branco River
    - Guaporé River
      - Branco River (Cabixi River)
      - Guaritire River
      - Verde River
      - Galera River
      - Sararé River
      - Barbado River
        - Alegre River

=== Tocantins/Araguaia Basin ===
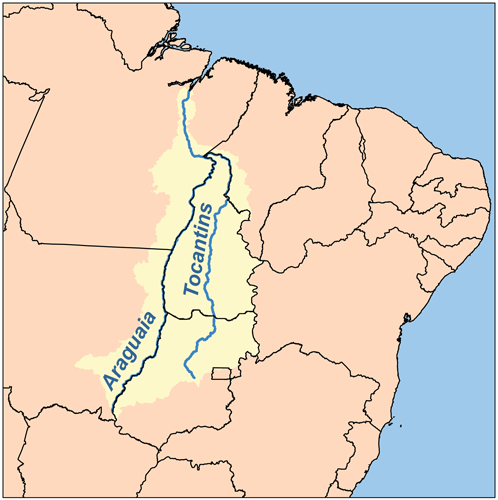
Map of the Araguaia/Tocantins basin

- Tocantins River (Pará)
  - Araguaia River
    - Ribeirão Crisóstomo
    - Tapirapé River
      - Xavante River
      - Xavantinho River
    - Rio das Mortes
      - São João River
        - Maracajá River (Baracaju River)
      - Mirapuxi River
      - Curuá River
      - Ribeirão Pindaíba
      - Noidoro River
      - Cumbuco River
    - Das Garças River
      - Barreiro River
    - Diamantino River

=== Paraná Basin ===
- Paraná River (Argentina)
  - Paraguay River
    - Taquari River
    - Cuiabá River
      - Mutum River
      - Piqueri River
        - Itiquira River
        - Correntes River
      - São Lourenço River
        - Poguba River (Vermelho River)
          - Ponte de Pedra River
          - Jorigue River
          - Tadarimana River
      - Coxipó River
      - Manso River
        - Roncador River
          - Casca River
    - Curiche Grande River (Corixa Grande River)
    - Cassanje River
      - Alegre River
    - Bento Gomes River
    - Paraguazinho River
      - Sagradouro Grande River
    - Jauru River
      - Aguapeí River
    - Cabaçal River
    - Sepotuba River
      - Juba River
    - Jauquara River

== Alphabetically ==
- Aguapeí River
- Alegre River
- Alegre River
- Apiacá River
- Araguaia River
- Arinos River
- Aripuanã River
- Arraias River
- Atelchu River
- Auaiá-Miçu River
- Ribeirão Auila
- Azul River
- Barbado River
- Barreiro River
- Bento Gomes River
- Branco River
- Branco River
- Branco River (Cabixi River)
- Buriti River
- Cabaçal River
- Camararé River
- Camarazinho River
- Capitão Cardoso River
- Da Casca River
- Cassanje River
- Correntes River
- Couto de Magalhães River
- Coxipó River
- Crauari River
- Ribeirão Crisóstomo
- Cristalino River
- Cuiabá River
- Culuene River
- Cumbuco River
- Curiche Grande River (Corixa Grande River)
- Curisevo River
- Curuá River
- Diamantino River
- Ferro River
- Flor do Prado River
- Formiga River
- Galera River
- Das Garças River
- Guaporé River
- Guaribe River
- Guaritire River
- Huaiá-Miçu River
- Iriri River
- Iriri Novo River
- Itiquira River
- Jabotá River
- Da Jacutinga River
- Jauquara River
- Jauru River
- Jorigue River
- Juba River
- Juína River
- Juína-Miriam River
- Juininha River
- Juruena River
- Kevuaieli River
- Liberdade River
- Madeirinha River
- Manissauá-Miçu River
- Manso River
- Maracajá River (Baracaju River)
- Membeca River
- Mirapuxi River
- Rio das Mortes
- Mutum River
- Noidoro River
- Pacuneiro River
- Papagaio River
- Parado River
- Paraguay River
- Paraguazinho River
- Paranaíta River
- Parecis River
- Dos Patos River
- Ribeirão da Paz
- Dos Peixes River
- Peixoto de Azevedo River
- Ribeirão Pindaíba
- Piqueri River
- Poguba River (Vermelho River)
- Ponte de Pedra River
- Ronuro River
- Roosevelt River
- Sacre River
- Sacuriuiná River
- Do Sangue River
- São João River
- São João da Barra River
- São Lourenço River
- São Tomé River
- São Venceslau River
- Sararé River
- Sauêruiná River
- Sepotuba River
- Sete de Setembro River
- Sucunduri River
- Sagradouro Grande River
- Suia-Miçu River
- Sumidouro Grande River
- Tadarimana River
- Tamitatoale River
- Tapirapé River
- Taquari River
- Teles Pires River
- Tenente Marques River
- Verde River
- Verde River
- Verde River
- Vermelho River
- Xavante River
- Xavantinho River
- Xingu River
