= Ribeirão =

Ribeirão may refer to:

== Places ==
Brazil

- Ribeirão, Pernambuco, municipality in the state of Pernambuco
- Ribeirão Arrudas, stream in the state of Minas Gerais
- Ribeirão Auila, river in the state of Mato Grosso
- Ribeirão Barra Mansa, river in the state of São Paulo
- Ribeirão Bonito, municipality in the state of São Paulo
- Ribeirão Branco, municipality in the state of São Paulo
- Ribeirão Cascalheira, municipality in the state of Mato Grosso
- Ribeirão Claro, municipality in the state of Paraná
- Ribeirão Corrente, municipality in the state of São Paulo
- Ribeirão Crisóstomo, river in the state of Mato Grosso
- Ribeirão da Paz, river in the state of Pará
- Ribeirão das Lajes, river in the state of Rio de Janeiro
- Ribeirão das Neves, municipality located in the state of Minas Gerais
- Ribeirão do Largo, municipality in the state of Bahia
- Ribeirão do Pinhal, municipality in the state of Paraná
- Ribeirão do Sul, municipality in the state of São Paulo
- Ribeirão dos Índios, municipality in the state of São Paulo
- Ribeirão Grande, municipality in the state of São Paulo
- Ribeirão Lontra, river in the state of Mato Grosso do Sul
- Ribeirão Pindaíba, river in the state of Mato Grosso
- Ribeirão Pires, municipality in the state of São Paulo
- Ribeirão Preto, municipality in the state of São Paulo
- Ribeirão River, river in the state of Espírito Santo
- Ribeirão Santa Maria, river in the state of Pará
- Ribeirão Santana, river in the state of Pará
- Ribeirão Vermelho, municipality in the state of Minas Gerais

Portugal

- Ribeirão, a parish in Vila Nova de Famalicão
  - G.D. Ribeirão, Portuguese football club

== See also ==
- Ribeirão do Tempo, Brazilian telenovela
