= Irantxe language =

Indigenous language of Mato Grosso, Brazil

Irántxe
- Irántxe-Mỹky
- Manoki, Mỹky
- Native to: Brazil
- Region: Mato Grosso
- Ethnicity: 280 Irántxe and 80 Münkü (2012)
- Native speakers: 90, including 10 Irántxe proper (2012)
- Language family: Language isolate
- Dialects: Mỹky; Iránxte (Manoki)
- Writing system: Latin (Mỹky)

Language codes
- ISO 639-3: irn
- Glottolog: iran1263
- ELP: Irantxe
- Iranxe is classified as Critically Endangered by the UNESCO Atlas of the World's Languages in Danger.

Irántxe (Irántxe, Iranxe, Iranshe) /iˈrɑːntʃeɪ/, also known as Mỹky (Münkü) or still as Irántxe-Münkü, is an indigenous language spoken by the Irántxe (Iránxe, Iranche, Manoki, Munku) and Mỹky (Mynky, Münkü, Munku, Menku, Kenku, Myy) peoples in the state of Mato Grosso in Brazil. Recent descriptions of the language analyze it as a language isolate, in that it "bears no similarity with other language families". Monserrat (2010) is a well-reviewed grammar of the language.

== Vitality ==
According to the UNESCO Atlas of the World's Languages in Danger, Irántxe-Mỹky is currently not thriving. While the Mỹky dialect is considered "vulnerable", the Irántxe variety is deemed "considerably endangered", with only 10 fluent speakers out of the 356 ethnic Irántxe-Mỹky in the 2006 report. As of 2011, the 280 Irántxe have largely assimilated to Brazilian culture. Most are monolingual in Portuguese, and the remaining Irántxe speakers are over 50 years old. A splinter group, the Mỹky, however, moved to escape assimilation, and were isolated until 1971. As of 2011, there were 80 ethnic Mỹky, all of whom spoke the language.

== Dialects ==
Dialects and location:

- Irántxe dialect: spoken in Cravari village, on the Cravari River (a tributary of the Do Sangue River) in the municipality of Diamantino, Mato Grosso.
- Mỹky dialect: spoken at an isolated village at the headwaters of the Escondido Creek, in the municipality of Brasnorte, Mato Grosso state.

== Language contact ==
Jolkesky (2016) notes that there are lexical similarities with languages from the Arawak, Tupi, Chapakura-Wañam, Nambikwara, and Yanomami families, likely due to contact.

== Phonology ==
No instrumental phonetic data pertaining to the Irántxe-Mỹky language is available. The phonological description of Inrátxe-Mỹky is based exclusively on auditory analyses.

=== Consonants ===
Irántxe-Mỹky has a small consonant inventory. Voicing is not contrastive for any consonant. (Note: Meader (1967) treats [mb] as an allophone of a separate phoneme /b/ and mbʲ as bʲ.) In the Monserrat analysis shown in the table, there is a series of palatalized stops /pʲ tʲ kʲ/ and nasals /mʲ nʲ/, which reviewer D’Angelis (2011) analyzes as /Cj/ sequences. In Monserrat's analysis, /ʃ/ is a separate phoneme from /sʲ/.

		Bilabial		Alveolar		Palatal	Velar	Glottal
		voiceless	voiced	voiceless	voiced	Palatal	Velar	Glottal
Stop	plain	p	b	t	(d)		k	ʔ
Stop	pal. (Note: Meader (1967) transcribes palatalized consonants as /P/, /T/, /K/, /B/, /M/, /W/.)	pʲ	bʲ	tʲ			kʲ	
Nasal	plain		m	n				
Nasal	pal.		mʲ	nʲ				
Fricative	plain			s		ʃ		h
Fricative	pal.			(sʲ)				
Trill					r			
Approximant			w			j		

The glottal stop /ʔ/ only occurs word-medially. /d/ is attested solely in the words /ˈkaduri/ 'anaconda', /ˈkadoˈhi/ 'jacú', and the personal name /ˈkãduri/.

==== Allophonic variation ====
- The bilabial /m/ may occur as [mb] word initially, especially among the Irántxe: muhu [mbuhu], mjehy [mbʲɛhɨ].
- The sibilant /s/ is pronounced [ʃ] before /j/.
- The trill /r/ may also occur as [l].
- The palatal approximant /j/ occurs as [ɲ] before nasal vowels.
- /k/ is voiced to [g] before /n/.

=== Vowels ===
The vowel inventory of Irántxe-Mỹky is large, with 21 phonemic vowels. Vowel length and nasalization are contrastive in the language. The role of tone is not clear.

Irántxe Vowels
	Front	Mid	Back
Close	i ĩ iː	ɨ ɨ̃ ɨː	u ũ uː
Mid	ɛ ɛ̃ ɛː	ə ə̃ əː	ɔ ɔ̃ ɔː
Open		a ã aː	

In many words, /ə/ alternates with /ɛ/.

Meader (1967) characterizes it as "high central tense" [ʌ̝].

The maximal syllable shape may be CVC or CjVC word-medially, depending on the analysis. Word-finally, only CV ~ CʲV syllables occur.

== Orthography ==
The linguist Ruth Monserrat, along with native speaker Beth Jurusi, developed a system for spelling the Mỹky dialect.

	Bilabial	Alveolar	Palatal	Velar	Glottal
Stop	p pj	t tj		k kj	ʼ
Nasal	m mj	n nj			
Fricative		s	x		h
Trill		r			
Approximant	w	(l)	j		
