= Brasnorte =

Coordinates: 12.155°S 57.9789°W

- Municipality
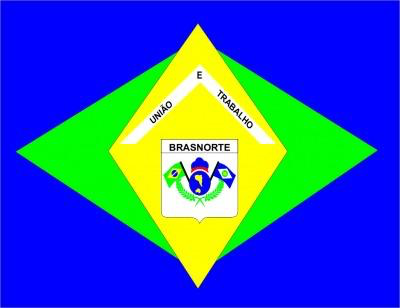
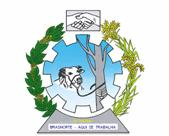
- Flag Coat of arms

- Country: Brazil
- Region: Center-West
- State: Mato Grosso
- Mesoregion: Norte Mato-Grossense

Population (2020)
  - Total: 20,140
- Time zone: UTC−3 (BRT)

Brasnorte is a Brazilian municipality in the state of Mato Grosso, located at a latitude of 12º09'18" south and a longitude of 57º58'44" west, at an altitude of 317 meters above sea level. Its estimated population in 2021 was 20,571 inhabitants. Its area is 15,968.355 km², making it the 74th largest municipality in Brazil in terms of territorial dimension, larger than some countries like Lebanon and Northern Ireland.

== History ==
In 1967, the development of an agricultural project began with resources from the Superintendency for the Development of the Amazon. Later, part of the chosen area was sold to the Roderjan Group and subdivided in 1974. However, the definitive habitation of Brasnorte began in 1978 through Nelson Vetorello, who sold urban and rural lots and acquired part of the lands that today constitute the urban area of the municipality, while the former Roderjan Group retained a part that was transformed into the Cravari Farm.

The first workers in the municipality came from the western region of Paraná, most of whom lived in cities and rural areas flooded by the waters of the Paraná River following the closing of the Itaipu Dam gates. Many Brazilians from various parts of the country accepted the proposal to live in Brasnorte.

Adão Bueno arrived in the region on August 1, 1978, and Adão Passamani, an agricultural technician, set up a camp on the left bank of the Cravari River on August 22 of the same year. On October 25, Luiz Barbosa arrived in Brasnorte, determined to settle there.

The first houses were built with wood transported by raft via the Sangue and Cravari Rivers from the Adolfo Cortese sawmill.

The Bianchini family built the first sawmill in Brasnorte in 1979. On May 27 of the same year, Father José Mathias Orth celebrated the first mass in the city. This same priest took the initiative to create the first school in a car garage with 13 students. Pierina Dani Polinski was the first teacher, fulfilling all roles: teacher, principal, cook, and cleaner.

The Brasnorte region had belonged to the municipality of Diamantino, and Law No. 4,239, dated November 4, 1980, created the District of Brasnorte. Its installation was carried out by Manoel Ribeiro Filho.

The community mobilized and created the Representative Commission of the People of Brasnorte, which aimed to achieve benefits for the District, succeeding in various demands.

On November 15, 1982, municipal elections were held throughout the state, with the District of Brasnorte electing Ezequias Vicente da Silva as Vice-Mayor. This action helped install the electricity network and many other reforms and constructions in the city.

The District grew in an orderly manner and again participated in politics, this time requesting political emancipation. The meeting took place inside the Brasnorte Parish Hall, under the leadership of Ezequias Vicente da Silva, during which a project was drawn up with arguments to convince the State Parliament of the feasibility of the place's emancipation.

Thus, Law No. 5,047, dated September 5, 1986, authored by Deputies Oscar Ribeiro, Roberto Cruz, and Joaquim Sucena, created the municipality.

== Climate ==
The local climate is equatorial (hot and humid) in the north and tropical (with a dry season) in the south. The period of concentrated rains extends from January to March, with an annual average precipitation of 2,250 mm. The average annual temperature is 24°C, with the highest temperature being 40°C and the lowest 0°C.

Due to the influence of the Atlantic polar mass that enters through the Andes Mountains, temperatures drop sharply between April and September, reaching values close to or below 10°C at least seven times a year (cold snap phenomenon). On July 18, 1975, during a strong polar air mass, the minimum temperatures reached 0°C, and there was frost. In recent years, record minimum temperatures have been around 9°C. From May to April, the rain falls intensely, which can cause low maximum temperatures and a feeling of cold during the afternoons.

=== Hydrographic Basin ===
Brasnorte municipality is part of the Amazon Basin. It contributes to the Juruena River Basin, which receives the Sangue and Papagaio rivers on its right. The Sangue River receives the Cravari River on its left.

=== Relief ===
Brasnorte municipality contains the Pareci Plateau to the south and the Southern Amazon Interplanaltic Depression to the north.

=== Geological Formation ===
Undeformed Phanerozoic covers, indivisible Paleozoic Basin to the north, Pareci Mesozoic Basin to the south. Undifferentiated Archaean and Precambrian Metamorphic Complexes, Basal Complex. Brazilian Mobile Belt in the north.

== Economy ==
The municipal economy is based on agribusiness, supported by soybean, corn, and rice crops, as well as livestock farming. Commerce is diversified, and people generally do not need to resort to larger centers to acquire more industrialized products. The production value in 2020 was 1.8 billion reais. These characteristics have made Brasnorte one of the largest agricultural economies in Brazil, with the municipal government intending to further expand the municipality's production and participation in the Brazilian agricultural economy.

== Media ==
=== TV Channels ===
TV Centro América, Rede Globo, Channel 9

Rede TV, Channel 27

=== Radio Stations ===
Rádio Amazônia FM, FM 87.9

Band FM, FM 98.1

== See also ==
- List of municipalities in Mato Grosso
