= Formiga River =

There are several rivers named Formiga River in Brazil:

- Formiga River (Mato Grosso)
- Formiga River (Tocantins)

== See also ==
- Formiga (disambiguation)
