= Culuene Biological Reserve =

Biological reserve in Mato Grosso, Brazil

- Reserva Biológica Culuene
- IUCN category Ia (strict nature reserve)
- Location within Brazil
- Nearest city: Paranatinga, Mato Grosso
- Coordinates: 13°49′26″S 53°17′37″W
- Area: 3,900 ha (15 sq mi)
- Designation: Biological reserve
- Created: 10 January 1989
- Administrator: Coordenadoria de Unidades de Conservação MT

The Culuene Biological Reserve (Portuguese: Reserva Biológica Culuene) is a biological reserve in the state of Mato Grosso, Brazil. It protects an area of cerrado forest in contact with seasonal deciduous forest on the left (west) bank of the Culuene River.

== Location ==
The Culuene Biological Reserve is in the municipality of Paranatinga, Mato Grosso. It has an area of 3,900 hectares (9,600 acres). The reserve is bounded by the Culuene River to the east and the Rio Grande stream to the west. It is in the Xingu River basin.

== History ==
The reserve covers part of the former Gleba Pantanalzinho. The Culuene State Ecological Reserve was created by state decree 1.387 of 10 January 1989, with an area of 3,900 hectares (9,600 acres). The purpose was to preserve the fauna and flora due to high levels of deforestation, particularly in the headwaters and river banks, and to stop uncontrolled mining that caused silting of the rivers.

By ordinance 723 of 26 September 2011 the category was changed and the conservation unit became the Culuene State Biological Reserve. In September 2013 there was a manager for the Culuene Biological Reserve and the Rio Ronuro Ecological Station, and two agents for the two conservation units. SEMA/MT stated that the protection plans for the two units was under review. Ordinance 622 of 15 December 2014 created the consultative council. As of June 2015 regularization of land ownership was complete but the reserve still did not have a management plan.

== Environment ==
The Culuene Biological Reserve is in the center of the Brazilian cerrado. Vegetation is open wooded cerrado, with and without gallery forest, in an area of contact between cerrado, seasonal forest and seasonal semi-deciduous forest. Fauna include marsh deer (Blastocerus dichotomus), collared peccary (Pecari tajacu), lowland paca (Cuniculus paca), capybara (Hydrochoerus hydrochaeris), jaguar (Panthera onca) and birds such as Muscovy duck (Cairina moschata), great egret (Ardea alba), green-winged macaw (Ara chloropterus) and toco toucan (Ramphastos toco).

The main threats are from fires, pressures caused by the expansion of the agricultural frontier, contamination of the river by agricultural chemicals and intrusion from the private properties that surround the reserve. It is influenced by the small Paranatinga II hydroelectric plant on the Culuene River. A 2009 analysis of conservation units in Mato Grosso rated the Culuene Ecological Reserve as having relatively low biological importance. The reserve and the Rio Ronuro Ecological Station were subject to high levels of threats and pressures compared to others. The reserve was ranked as the least effectively managed among the fully protected areas other than parks in the state.

== Sources ==
- Lima, Luiz Henrique (2015), Relatório Preliminar de Monitoramento Acerca da Auditoria Operacional nas Unidades de Conservação Estaduais do Bioma Amazônia em Mato Grosso (in Portuguese), Tribunal de Contas Mato Grosso
- Onaga, Cristina Aragão; Drumond, Maria Auxiliadora (2009), Implementação da Avaliação Rápida e Priorização da Gestão de Unidades de Conservação – Rappam – em unidades de conservação no Estado de Mato Grosso (PDF), Brasília: WWF-BRASIL, Sema / MT, ICMBio
- REBIO do Culuene (in Portuguese), ISA: Instituto Socioambiental
