= Xavante River =

There are two rivers named Xavante River in Brazil:

- Xavante River (Mato Grosso)
- Xavante River (Tocantins)

== See also ==
- Xavante (disambiguation)
