= Culuene River =

- Mouth location in Brazil
- Native name: Rio Culuene (Portuguese)

Location
- Country: Brazil

Physical characteristics
- Source
  - location: Mato Grosso state
- Mouth
  - coordinates: 12°55′33″S 52°49′39″W
- Length: 600

Basin features
- River system: Xingu River

Culuene River near Gaúcha do Norte, Mato Grosso

The Culuene River, or Kuluene River is a 600 km tributary of Xingu River in Mato Grosso, a state in western Brazil. The main economic activities in the region are agriculture and cattle farming.

It joins the Xingu from the southeast in the Xingu Indigenous Park. The Culuene Biological Reserve is south of the park in the municipality of Paranatinga, Mato Grosso.

== See also ==
- List of rivers of Mato Grosso
