= Branco River (Aripuanã River tributary) =

Location
- Country: Brazil

Physical characteristics
- Source
  - location: Mato Grosso state
- Mouth
  - location: Aripuanã River
  - coordinates: 9°47′S 59°24′W

The Branco River is a tributary of the Aripuanã River in Mato Grosso in western Brazil. It merges into the Aripuanã River downstream from the town of Aripuanã

== See also ==
- List of rivers of Mato Grosso
