= Das Garças River =

There are several rivers named Das Garças River or Rio das Garças in Brazil:

- Das Garças River (Mato Grosso)
- Das Garças River (Rondônia)
