= Jacutinga River =

There are several rivers named Jacutinga River in Brazil:

- Jacutinga River (Paraná)
- Jacutinga River (Das Antas River tributary)
- Jacutinga River (Uruguay River tributary)
- Da Jacutinga River
