= Suia =

Suia may refer to:

- Suia (Crete), a town of ancient Crete, Greece
- Suia-Miçu River, a river of Brazil
- Suia Missu River, a river of Brazil
