= Teles Pires =

River in Mato Grosso & Pará, Brazil

Teles Pires River São Manuel River
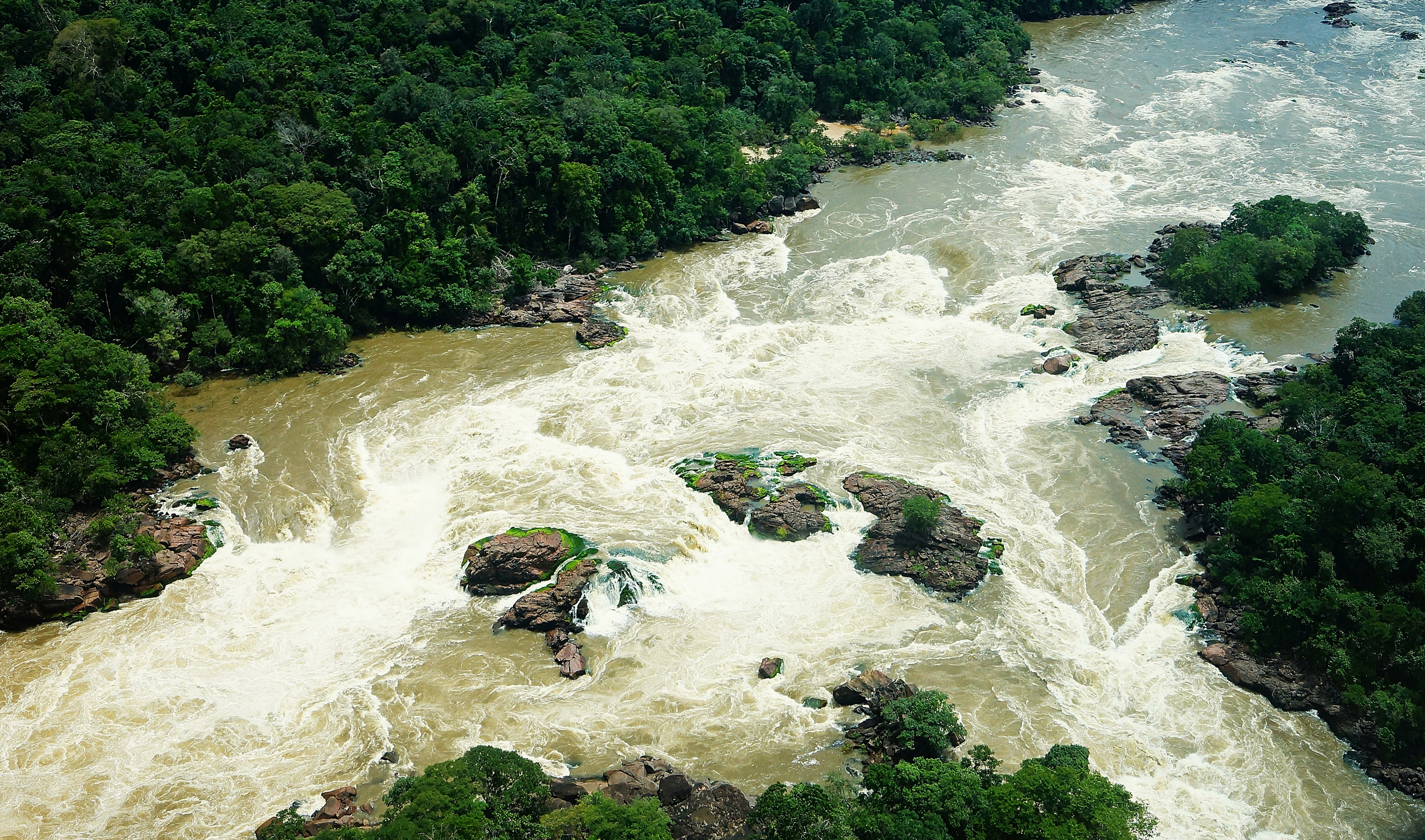

Location
- Country: Brazil

Physical characteristics
- Source
  - location: Mato Grosso Plateau, Mato Grosso State
  - coordinates: 14°52′9.7608″S 54°38′52.8468″W
  - elevation: 750 m (2,460 ft)
- Mouth: Tapajós River
  - location: Mato Grosso State
  - coordinates: 7°21′01″S 58°08′18″W
  - elevation: 100 m (330 ft)
- Length: 1,370 km (850 mi)
- Basin size: 141,987 km^{2} (54,821 sq mi)
- Discharge
  - location: Confluence of Juruena
  - average: (Period: 1970-2000)3,960.8 m^{3}/s (139,870 cu ft/s)
- Discharge
  - location: Três Marias, Pará State, Mato Grosso State (Basin size: 137,485 km^{2} (53,083 sq mi)
  - average: (Period of data: 1970-1996)3,978 m^{3}/s (140,500 cu ft/s) (Period: 1970-2000)3,806.5 m^{3}/s (134,430 cu ft/s) (Period: 1976-2008)3,741 m^{3}/s (132,100 cu ft/s)
  - minimum: 861 m^{3}/s (30,400 cu ft/s)
  - maximum: 10,362 m^{3}/s (365,900 cu ft/s)
- Discharge
  - location: Indeco, Mato Grosso State (Basin size: 51,277 km^{2} (19,798 sq mi)
  - average: (Period of data: 1970-1996)1,178 m^{3}/s (41,600 cu ft/s)

Basin features
- Tributaries
  - left: Verde, Apiacás
  - right: Peixoto de Azevedo, São Benedito

The Teles Pires (Portuguese: Rio São Manuel) is a 1,370 km (850 mi) long river in Brazil. The river flows through the state of Mato Grosso and its lower part marks the border between the states of Mato Grosso and Pará. At its mouth it joins Juruena River and together they form the Tapajós, which is one of the biggest tributaries of the Amazon River. The most important settlement along the river is Alta Floresta. One writer says that it was originally called the Paranatinga, and was renamed after Captain Telles Pires who died exploring the river in 1889.

Several dams are planned on the river in the "Hidrovia Tapajos/Teles Pires" project to create a navigable waterway connecting the interior of Brazil to the Atlantic Ocean. The waterway will consist of five dams on the Teles Pires river (53 megawatts (71,000 hp) Magessi Dam, 430 megawatts (580,000 hp) Sinop Dam, 342 megawatts (459,000 hp) Colíder Dam, 1,820 megawatts (2,440,000 hp) Teles Pires Dam, 746 megawatts (1,000,000 hp) Sao Manoel Dam) and the 5,230 megawatts (7,010,000 hp) Foz do Apiacas Dam on the Apiacas river.

The Colíder Dam and the Teles Pires Dam are currently under construction, while the smaller upstream dams are still in the planning stages.
