= Ferro River =

Coordinates: 12°27′13″S 54°31′53″W

Location
- Country: Brazil

Physical characteristics
- Source
  - location: Mato Grosso state

The Ferro River is a river of Mato Grosso state in western Brazil. It flows northeast, receives the Steinen River from the south, enters the Xingu Indigenous Park, receives the combined Ronuro and Jatoba rivers from the south and joins the Xingu River which flows north into the Amazon.

== See also ==
- List of rivers of Mato Grosso
