= Flor do Prado River =

- Location within Brazil
- Native name: Rio Flor do Prado (Portuguese)

Location
- Country: Brazil

Physical characteristics
- Mouth
  - location: Roosevelt River, Aripuanã, Mato Grosso
  - coordinates: 10.713075°S 60.446436°W

Basin features
- River system: Roosevelt River

The Flor do Prado River is a river in the state of Mato Grosso in Brazil, a right tributary of the Roosevelt River.

The 8,517 hectares (21,050 acres) Rio Flor do Prado Ecological Station, a fully protected environmental unit created in 2003, lies on the right bank of the river.

== See also ==
- List of rivers of Mato Grosso
