= Correntes River (Mato Grosso) =

Location
- Country: Brazil

Physical characteristics
- Source
  - location: Mato Grosso state
- Mouth
  - coordinates: 17°39′S 55°8′W

The Correntes River is a river of Mato Grosso state in western Brazil.

The Correntes River, which flows into the Itiquira River on the left bank in the municipality of Sonora, has its headwaters at an altitude of approximately 660 meters and extends for 240 km. After running for about 3 km in Sonora, it begins to define the border with the state of Mato Grosso, until it continues towards the municipality of Corumbá. However, on the Morro Formoso topographic map from the Ministry of the Army, it is identified as the Piquiri River. Despite this reference, the official name is Correntes, as established in Article 2 of Supplementary Law No. 31 of October 11, 1977, which created the state of Mato Grosso do Sul, and confirmed by IBGE maps.

== See also ==
- List of rivers of Mato Grosso
