= Auaiá-Miçu River =

- Native name: Rio Auaiá-Miçu (Portuguese)

Location
- Country: Brazil
- State: Mato Grosso

Physical characteristics
- Source
  - location: São Félix do Araguaia
- Mouth
  - location: Xingu River
  - coordinates: 10°51′01″S 53°07′24″W

Basin features
- Tributaries
  - left: Preto River, São Francisco River

The Auaiá-Miçu River is a river located in the Mato Grosso state of western Brazil.

== See also ==
- List of rivers of Mato Grosso
