= Aguapeí River (Mato Grosso) =

Aguapeí River Rio Aguapeí (Portuguese)
- Location within Brazil

Location
- Country: Brazil

Physical characteristics
- Source
  - location: Mato Grosso state
- Mouth
  - coordinates: 15.873062°S 58.398621°W

Basin features
- River system: Jauru River

The Aguapeí River (Portuguese: Rio Aguapeí) is a river of Mato Grosso state in western Brazil. It is a tributary of the Jauru River, which in turn is a tributary of the Paraguay River.

== Course ==
The Aguapeí River rises in the 120,092 hectares (296,750 acres) Serra de Santa Bárbara State Park, then runs in a roughly northeast direction until it meets the Jauru.

== See also ==
- List of rivers of Mato Grosso

== Sources ==
- PES Serra de Santa Bárbara (in Portuguese), ISA: Instituto Socioambiental
