= Rio Verde (Sacre River tributary) =

Location
- Country: Brazil

Physical characteristics
- Source
  - location: Mato Grosso state
- Mouth: Sacre River
  - coordinates: 13°32′S 58°2′W

Rio Verde (Portuguese for "green river") is a river of Mato Grosso state in western Brazil. It is a tributary of the Sacre River.

== See also ==
- List of rivers of Mato Grosso
