= Noidoro River =

Noidoro River Rio Francisco Horta Barbosa

Location
- Country: Brazil

Physical characteristics
- Source
  - location: Mato Grosso state
- Mouth
  - location: Rio das Mortes
  - coordinates: 14°48′S 52°39′W

The Noidoro River is a river of Mato Grosso state in western Brazil, a tributary of the Rio das Mortes. It is also known as the Rio Francisco Horta Barbosa.

== See also ==
- List of rivers of Mato Grosso
