= Tadarimana River =

Coordinates: 16°29′16″S 54°31′13″W

Location
- Country: Brazil

Physical characteristics
- Source
  - location: Mato Grosso state

The Tadarimana River is a river of Mato Grosso state in western Brazil.

== See also ==
- List of rivers of Mato Grosso
