= Paranaíta River =

Coordinates: 9°23′47″S 56°44′12″W

Location
- Country: Brazil

Physical characteristics
- Source
  - location: Mato Grosso state

The Paranaíta River is a river of Mato Grosso state in western Brazil.

== See also ==
- List of rivers of Mato Grosso
