= Sumidouro Grande River =

Coordinates: 13°24′14″S 56°36′32″W

Location
- Country: Brazil

Physical characteristics
- Source
  - location: Mato Grosso state

The Sumidouro Grande River is a river of Mato Grosso state in western Brazil.

== See also ==
- List of rivers of Mato Grosso
