= Jabotá River =

Jatobá River

Location
- Country: Brazil

Physical characteristics
- Source
  - location: Mato Grosso state
- Mouth
  - coordinates: 12°23′S 54°7′W

The Jabotá River is a river of Mato Grosso state in western Brazil. The headwaters are the traditional home of the Ikpeng people.

== See also ==
- List of rivers of Mato Grosso
