= Atelchu River =

Coordinates: 12°06′S 53°47′W

Location
- Country: Brazil

Physical characteristics
- Source
  - location: Mato Grosso state

The Atelchu River is a river of Mato Grosso state in western Brazil.

== See also ==
- List of rivers of Mato Grosso
