= Jauquara River =

Coordinates: 15°06′10″S 57°05′52″W

Location
- Country: Brazil

Physical characteristics
- Source
  - location: Mato Grosso state

The Jauquara River is a river of Mato Grosso state in western Brazil.

== See also ==
- List of rivers of Mato Grosso
