= Curiche Grande River =

Location
- Country: Brazil, Bolivia

Physical characteristics
- Source
  - location: Mato Grosso state
- Mouth: Paraguay River
  - coordinates: 17°44′S 57°43′W

The Curiche Grande River (also known in English as the Corixa Grande River; in Brazil it is called Corixa Grande, and in Bolivia Curiche Grande) is a river of Mato Grosso state in western Brazil. It forms a portion of the international border between Brazil and Bolivia.

== See also ==
- List of rivers of Mato Grosso
