= Branco River (Roosevelt River tributary) =

Location
- Country: Brazil

Physical characteristics
- Source
  - location: Mato Grosso state
- Mouth: Roosevelt River
  - coordinates: 9°38′S 60°39′W

The Branco River is a river of Mato Grosso state in western Brazil. It is a tributary of the Roosevelt River.

== See also ==
- List of rivers of Mato Grosso
