= Comandante Fontoura River =

- Native name: Rio Comandante Fontoura (Portuguese)

Location
- Country: Brazil
- State: Mato Grosso, Pará

Physical characteristics
- Source
  - location: Serra do Roncador
- Mouth: Xingu River
  - coordinates: 9°40′S 52°16′W
- Length: 450 km (280 mi)

Basin features
- Tributaries
  - right: Ribeirão Preto River

The Comandante Fontoura (Portuguese: Rio Comandante Fontoura) is a river in the state of Mato Grosso, Brazil, a right tributary of the Xingu River. It starts in the Serra do Roncador, in the Maraiwatsede Indigenous Territory. It flows northwards and meets the Xingu River at the border of Mato Grosso and Pará.

The river is named after Otávio Gusmão de Fontoura who explored its basin in 1913.
