= Azul River (Mato Grosso) =

Location
- Country: Brazil

Physical characteristics
- Source
  - location: Mato Grosso state
- Mouth
  - coordinates: 11°15′S 54°42′W

The Azul River is a river of Mato Grosso state in western Brazil.

== See also ==
- List of rivers of Mato Grosso
