= Mirapuxi River =

Coordinates: 13°06′S 51°10′W

Location
- Country: Brazil

Physical characteristics
- Source
  - location: Mato Grosso state

The Mirapuxi River is a river of Mato Grosso state in western Brazil.

== See also ==
- List of rivers of Mato Grosso
