= Parado River =

Location
- Country: Brazil

Physical characteristics
- Source
  - location: Mato Grosso state
- Mouth
  - coordinates: 10°16′S 55°42′W

The Parado River is a river of Mato Grosso state in western Brazil.

The river’s elevation is approximately 175 meters above sea level.

== See also ==
- List of rivers of Mato Grosso
