= Juína-Mirim River =

River in Brazil

- Location within Brazil

Location
- Country: Brazil

Physical characteristics
- Source
  - location: Mato Grosso state
- Mouth
  - location: Juruena River
  - coordinates: 11°21′S 58°20′W

The Juína-Mirim River (Portuguese: Rio Juína-Mirim) is a river of Mato Grosso state in western Brazil. It is a tributary of the Juruena River.

== See also ==
- List of rivers of Mato Grosso
