= Rio Verde (Teles Pires tributary) =

Coordinates: 11.7297°S 55.7325°W

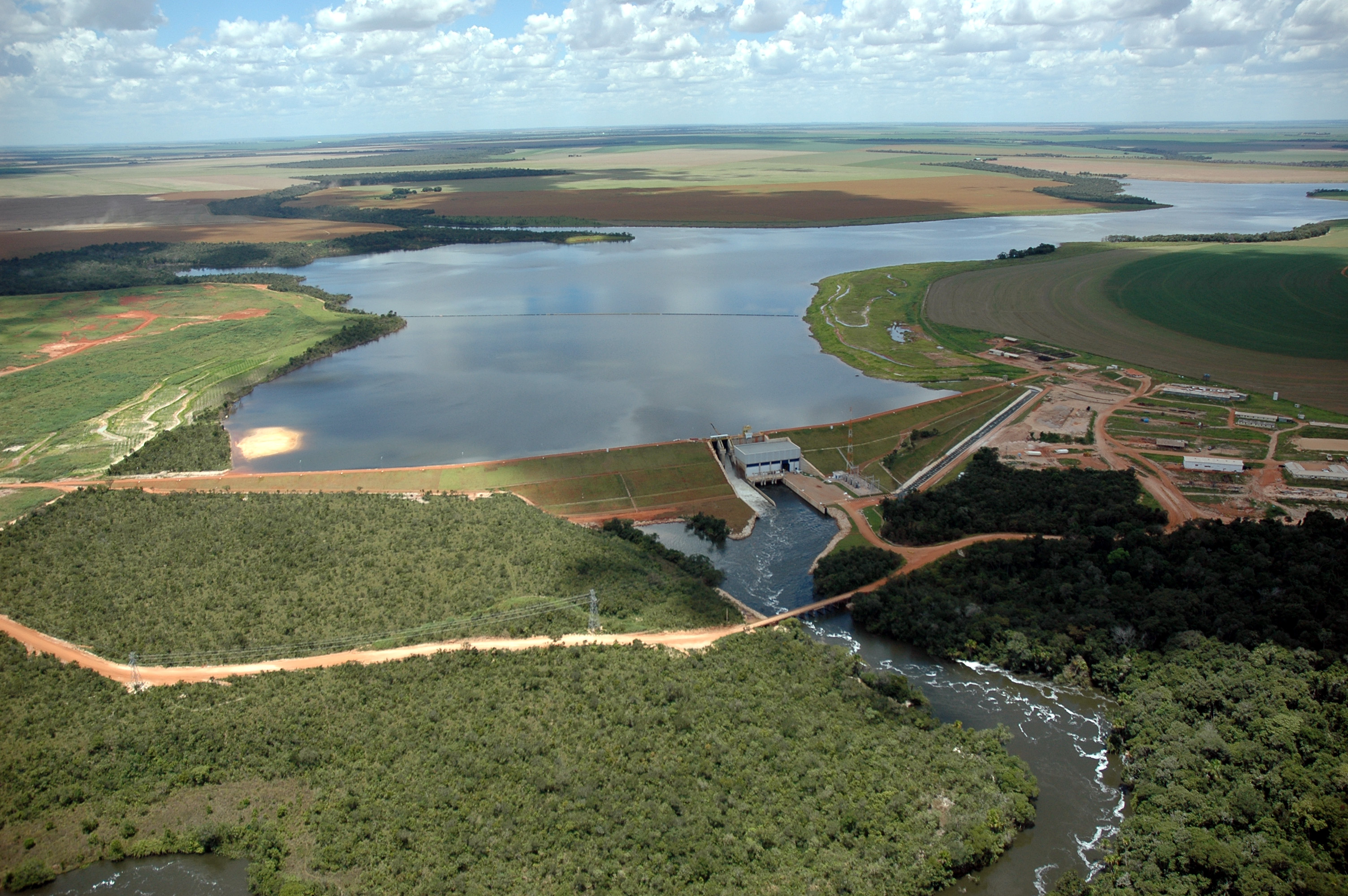

Location
- Country: Brazil
- State: Mato Grosso

Physical characteristics
- Source
  - location: Nobres, Mato Grosso
- Mouth: Teles Pires River
- Length: 310 km (190 mi)

Rio Verde (Portuguese for "green river") is a river of Mato Grosso state in western Brazil. It flows through the city of Lucas do Rio Verde.

== See also ==
- List of rivers of Mato Grosso
