= Formiga =

Formiga may refer to:

- Formiga, Minas Gerais, a municipality in Minas Gerais state, Brazil
- Morra da Formiga, a favela in Tijuca, Rio de Janeiro, Brazil

== People ==
- Formiga (footballer, born 1895), Brazilian men's footballer
- Chico Formiga, footballer, born 1930, full name Francisco Ferreira de Aguiar, Brazilian men's football defender
- Formiga (footballer, born 1976), full name Wander dos Santos Machado, Brazilian men's football forward
- Formiga (footballer, born 1978), full name Miraildes Maciel Mota, Brazilian women's football midfielder
- Formiga (futsal player) (born 1978), Portuguese futsal player
- Jussier Formiga (born 1985), Brazilian mixed martial artist

== Rivers ==
- Formiga River (Tocantins), central Brazil
- Formiga River (Mato Grosso), western Brazil
- Formiga River (Spain), in the Province of Huesca

== Other ==
- Formiga Esporte Clube, a Brazilian football club
- Santa Catarina, São Tomé and Príncipe, a small village in São Tomé in the Gulf of Guinea
