= São Venceslau River =

Coordinates: 12°18′02″S 56°57′19″W

Location
- Country: Brazil

Physical characteristics
- Source
  - location: Mato Grosso state

The São Venceslau River is a river of Mato Grosso state in western Brazil.

== See also ==
- List of rivers of Mato Grosso
