= São João da Barra River =

Coordinates: 8°56′28″S 58°33′00″W

Location
- Country: Brazil

Physical characteristics
- Source
  - location: Mato Grosso state
- Mouth
  - location: Juruena River

The São João da Barra River is a river of Mato Grosso state in western Brazil. It is a tributary of the Juruena River.

== See also ==
- List of rivers of Mato Grosso
