= Membeca River =

Coordinates: 12°49′49″S 57°23′03″W

Location
- Country: Brazil

Physical characteristics
- Source
  - location: Mato Grosso state

The Membeca River is a river of Mato Grosso state in western Brazil.

== See also ==
- List of rivers of Mato Grosso
