= Galera River =

Location
- Country: Brazil

Physical characteristics
- Source
  - location: Mato Grosso state
- Mouth: Guaporé River
  - coordinates: 14°25′31″S 60°06′47″W

The Galera River is a river in the Mato Grosso state in western Brazil.

== See also ==
- List of rivers of Mato Grosso
