= Xavante (disambiguation) =

The Xavante are an indigenous people of Brazil.

Xavante may also refer to:

- Xavante language, the language of the Xavante people
- Xavante River (Mato Grosso)
- Xavante River (Tocantins)
- Embraer AT-26 Xavante, a Brazilian version of the Aermacchi MB-326 aircraft
- Xavante (album), by Swedish musician Ulf Lundell

== See also ==
- Xavantina, Santa Catarina, Brazil
