= Guaritire River =

Coordinates: 13°43′S 60°38′W

Location
- Country: Brazil

Physical characteristics
- Source
  - location: Mato Grosso state

The Guaritire River is a river of Mato Grosso state in western Brazil.

== See also ==
- List of rivers of Mato Grosso
