= Juba River (Mato Grosso) =

Location
- Country: Brazil

Physical characteristics
- Source
  - location: Mato Grosso state
- Mouth
  - coordinates: 14°59′S 57°44′W

The Juba River is a river of Mato Grosso state in western Brazil.

== Watercourse ==
Along its 128.78 km (80.02 mi) length, the Juba River features a hydroelectric complex, consisting of two hydroelectric power plants and two small hydroelectric power plants. The river also contains several waterfalls along its course, with the Juba Falls being one of the most prominent; these falls mark the boundary between the municipalities of Tangará da Serra and Barra do Bugres.

== See also ==
- List of rivers of Mato Grosso
