= Pacuneiro River =

Coordinates: 13°03′15″S 53°25′11″W

Location
- Country: Brazil

Physical characteristics
- Source
  - location: Mato Grosso state

The Pacuneiro River is a river of Mato Grosso state in western Brazil.

== See also ==
- List of rivers of Mato Grosso
