= Coxipó River =

River in Brazil

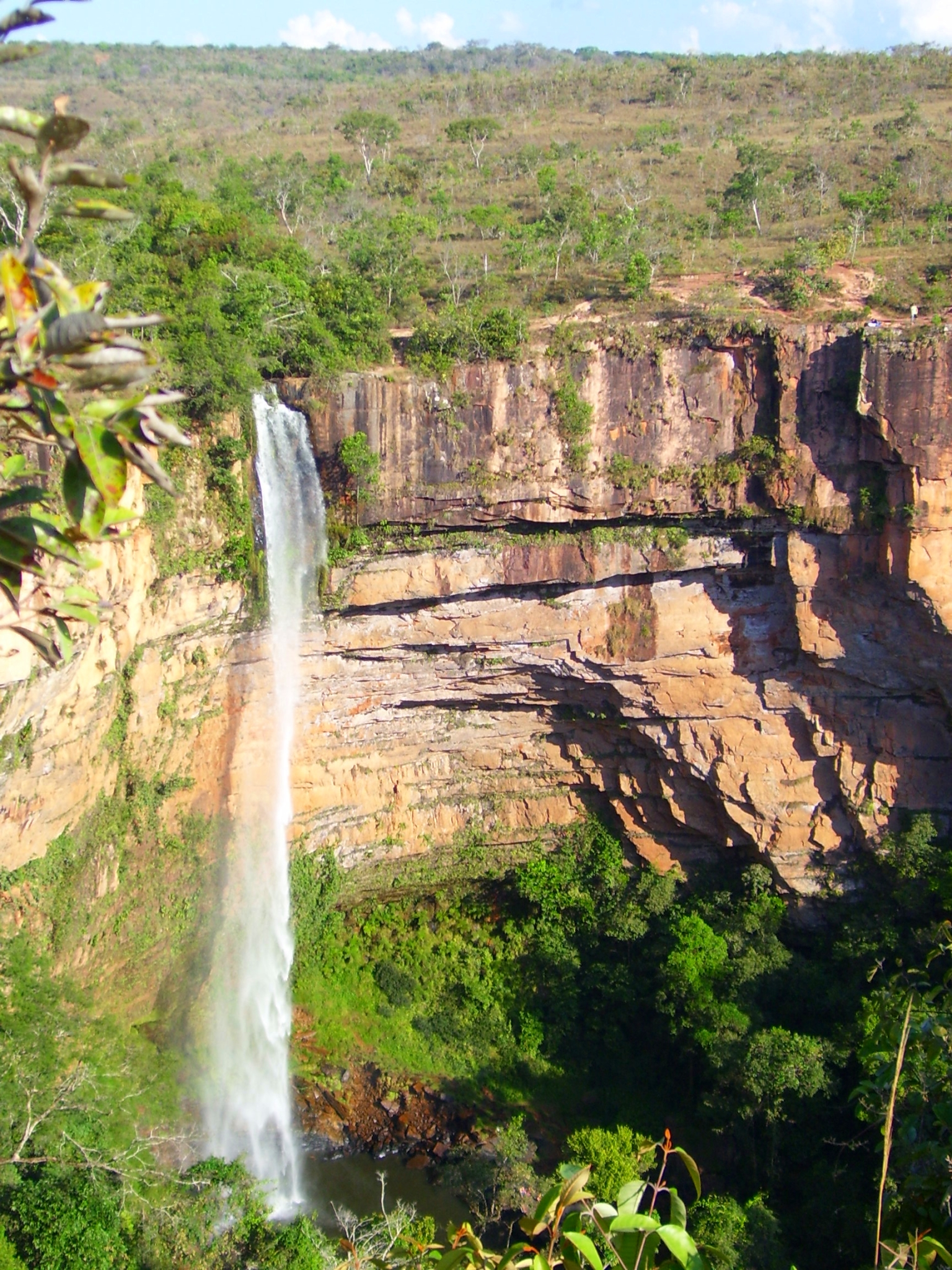
- Véu de Noiva Waterfall

Location
- Country: Brazil

Physical characteristics
- Source
  - location: Mato Grosso state
- Mouth
  - location: Cuiabá River
  - coordinates: 15°38′S 56°4′W

The Coxipó River is a river of Mato Grosso state in western Brazil.

== See also ==
- List of rivers of Mato Grosso
