= Rio Ronuro Ecological Station =

Ecological station in Mato Grosso, Brazil

- IUCN category Ia (strict nature reserve)
- Location within Brazil
- Nearest city: Sinop, Mato Grosso
- Coordinates: 12°58′08″S 54°29′24″W
- Area: 102,000 hectares (250,000 acres)
- Designation: Ecological station
- Created: 23 April 1998

Rio Ronuro Ecological Station (Portuguese: Estação Ecológica do Rio Ronuro) is an ecological station in the state of Mato Grosso, Brazil. It protects an area of contact between Amazon rainforest in the north and Cerrado semi-deciduous forest in the south. Since being created in 1998 it has been reduced in size and has suffered from significant deforestation.

== History ==
The Rio Ronuro Ecological Station was created on 23 April 1998 by the state of Mato Grosso to protect the environment, with an area of about 131,795 hectares (325,670 acres), in the municipality of Nova Ubiratã, Mato Grosso. The Xingu Indigenous Park is to the northeast of the unit. On 20 April 2005 the state legislative assembly reduced the area to 102,000 hectares (250,000 acres). The advisory council was formed on 12 April 2010. The conservation unit is supported by the Amazon Region Protected Areas Program.

== Environment ==
The Rio Ronuro Ecological Station (ESEC) is in the Xingu River basin, and is drained by the Santo Cristo, Hinternam, Von Den Steinen and Ronuro rivers. It is in the Amazon biome. The unit is in an area with an equatorial climate with a dry season in the winter. Average temperatures are above 25 °C (77 °F). Average annual rainfall is about 2,000 millimetres (79 in). The landscape is relatively flat. The ESEC would be in the proposed South Amazon Ecotones Ecological Corridor.

38% of the ESEC is covered by pioneer formations and 62% by mature forest, including open submontane Amazon rainforest in the north, seasonal semi-deciduous Cerrado forest in the south and the contact zone between these biomes. Species found in the unit include giant otter (Pteronura brasiliensis), black caiman (Melanosuchus niger), maned wolf (Chrysocyon brachyurus), cougar (Puma concolor), jaguar (Panthera onca), giant anteater (Myrmecophaga tridactyla) and giant armadillo (Priodontes maximus). Rare endemic fauna includes catitas (marmosa species) and sauiás (proechimys species).

== Challenges ==
The unit is threatened by illegal logging, land clearance for agriculture, indiscriminate hunting and fires. As of 2002 15% of the unit had been deforested. By 2005 that had risen to 20%. A 2014 study of ten protected areas in Mato Grosso, Rondônia and Pará whose size had been reduced since creation, including the Rio Ronuro Ecological Station, concluded that the reduction in area had caused the deforestation process to accelerate.

== Sources ==
- Ayres, José Márcio; Da Fonseca, Gustavo A. B.; Rylands, Anthony B.; Queiroz, Helder L.; Pinto, Luiz Paulo; Masterson, Donald; Cavalcanti, Roberto B. (2005), Os Corredores Ecológicos das Florestas Tropicais do Brasil (PDF) (in Portuguese), Sociedade Civil Mamirauá, archived from the original (PDF) on 2016-07-31
- ESEC Rio Ronuro, ISA: Instituto Socioambiental
- Estação Ecológica do Rio Ronuro (in Portuguese), Via Rural, archived from the original on June 4, 2016
- Full list: PAs supported by ARPA, ARPA
- Giovana Girardi (27 February 2014), "Reduzir area sobre protecao amplia desmatamento, diz estudo", Estadao (in Portuguese)
- Roberta dos Santos; Laurent Micol; Gustavo Irgang; Jane Vasconcellos (September 2006), O desmatamento nas Unidades de Conservação em Mato Grosso (PDF) (in Portuguese), Alta Floresta e Cuiabá: Instituto Centro de Vida - ICV, archived from the original (PDF) on 2016-09-24
