= Tamitatoala River =

River in Brazil

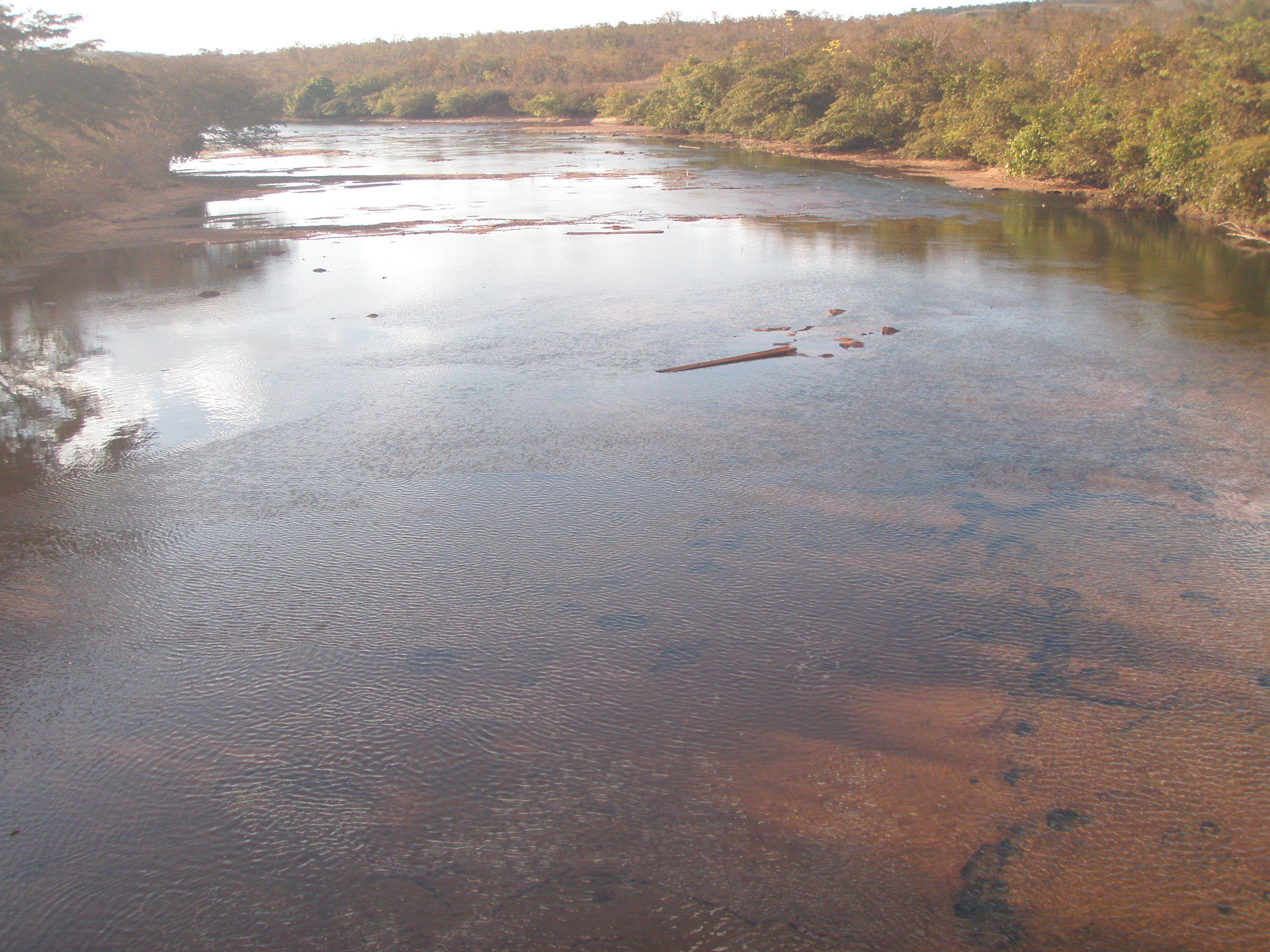

Location
- Country: Brazil

Physical characteristics
- Mouth: Ronuro River
  - location: BR
  - coordinates: 11°57′03″S 53°32′49″W
- Length: 330 km (210 mi)

The Tamitatoala River is a river in Brazil.

== See also ==
- List of rivers of Mato Grosso
