= Rio Flor do Prado Ecological Station =

Ecological station in Brazil

- Estação Ecológica do Rio Flor do Prado
- IUCN category Ia (strict nature reserve)
- Location within Brazil
- Nearest city: Aripuanã, Mato Grosso
- Coordinates: 10°40′34″S 60°22′40″W
- Area: 8,517 hectares (21,050 acres)
- Designation: Ecological station
- Created: 9 December 2003
- Administrator: Mato Grosso Secretariat of State for the Environment

The Rio Flor do Prado Ecological Station (Portuguese: Estação Ecológica do Rio Flor do Prado is an ecological station in Brazil. It protects an area of Amazon rainforest and is administered the state of Mato Grosso.

== Location ==
The Rio Flor do Prado Ecological Station has an area of 8,517 hectares (21,050 acres) in the municipality of Aripuanã, Mato Grosso. It is to the east of the Roosevelt River. The area is on the right bank of the Flor do Prado River, a tributary of the Roosevelt River, and is bordered by indigenous territories. It is in the Amazon biome. It has just over 66% open rainforest and about 34% dense rainforest.

== Conservation ==
The Rio Flor do Prado Ecological Station was created by decree 2.124 of 9 December 2003. The advisory council was established on 15 December 2014.

== Sources ==
- Amazon Biome: protected areas: Coordinated audit, Brasília: Federal Court of Accounts of Brazil, 2014
- Blairo Borges Maggi (9 December 2003), Decreto 2.124 de 09 de Dezembro de 2003 (in Portuguese), archived from the original on 2016-08-21
- ESEC do Rio Flor do Prado (in Portuguese), ISA: Instituto Socioambiental
