= Parecis River =

Coordinates: 12°58′S 56°44′W

Location
- Country: Brazil

Physical characteristics
- Source
  - location: Mato Grosso state

The Parecis River is a river of the Mato Grosso state in western Brazil.

== See also ==
- List of rivers of Mato Grosso
