= Buriti River (Mato Grosso) =

- Location within Brazil

Location
- Country: Brazil

Physical characteristics
- Source
  - location: Mato Grosso state
- Mouth
  - coordinates: 12°48′S 58°24′W

The Buriti River is a river of Mato Grosso state in western Brazil.

== See also ==
- List of rivers of Mato Grosso
