= São Tomé River (Mato Grosso) =

River in Brazil

- Location within Brazil
- Native name: Rio São Tomé (Portuguese)

Location
- Country: Brazil

Physical characteristics
- Source
  - location: Mato Grosso state
- Mouth
  - coordinates: 8.137123°S 58.284930°W

Basin features
- River system: Juruena River

The São Tomé River is a river of Mato Grosso state in western Brazil. It is a tributary of the Juruena River.

All of the river's sources are in the 19,582 square kilometres (7,561 sq mi) Juruena National Park, one of the largest conservation units in Brazil. The São Tomé basin occupies 23% of the park.

== See also ==
- List of rivers of Mato Grosso
