= Mutum River (Mato Grosso) =

River in Mato Grosso, Brazil; tributary of Cuiabá River

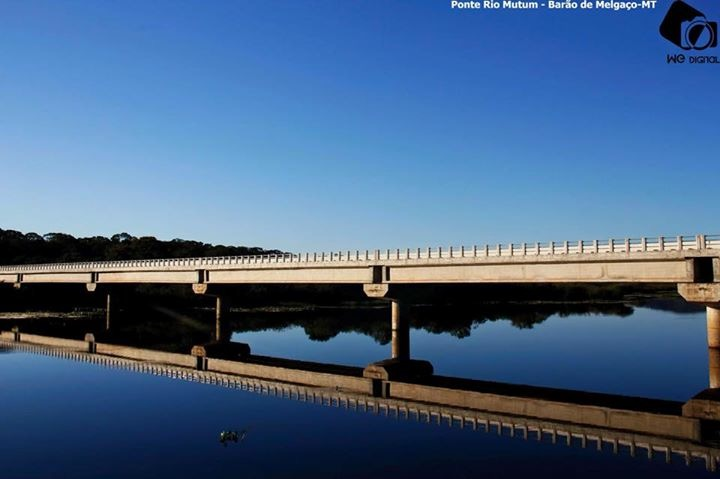
- Bridge over Mutum River near Barão de Melgaço

Location
- Country: Brazil

Physical characteristics
- Source
  - location: Mato Grosso state
- Mouth
  - coordinates: 16°19′S 55°49′W

The Mutum River is a river of Mato Grosso state in western Brazil.

== See also ==
- List of rivers of Mato Grosso
