= Kevuaieli River =

River in Mato Grosso, Brazil

Location
- Country: Brazil

Physical characteristics
- Source
  - location: Mato Grosso state
- Mouth
  - coordinates: 13°1′S 53°26′W

The Kevuaieli River is a river of Mato Grosso state in western Brazil.

== See also ==
- List of rivers of Mato Grosso
