= Rio Verde (Guaporé River tributary, Mato Grosso) =

Location
- Country: Brazil

Physical characteristics
- Source
  - location: Mato Grosso state
- Mouth
  - location: Guaporé River
  - coordinates: 13°59′S 60°23′W

The Rio Verde (Verde River) is a river of Mato Grosso state in western Brazil and eastern Bolivia. Before its mouth at the Guaporé River, the Verde forms the border between Brazil and Bolivia, at which point the Guaporé River forms the border.

== See also ==
- List of rivers of Mato Grosso
