= Juininha River =

Coordinates: 13°10′14″S 59°22′44″W

Location
- Country: Brazil

Physical characteristics
- Source
  - location: Mato Grosso state

The Juininha River is a river of Mato Grosso state in western Brazil.

== See also ==
- List of rivers of Mato Grosso
