= Santiago do Norte =

- Village
- Interactive map of Santiago do Norte
- Coordinates: 13°17′13″S 54°14′58″W
- Country: Brazil
- Region: Central-West
- State: Mato Grosso

Population (2017)
  - Total: 4,500
- Time zone: UTC -4

Santiago do Norte is a village in the state of Mato Grosso in the Central-West Region of Brazil. It is the urban extension of Paranatinga.

== See also ==
- List of municipalities in Mato Grosso
