= Bento Gomes River =

Coordinates: 16°40′S 57°12′W

Location
- Country: Brazil

Physical characteristics
- Source
  - location: Mato Grosso state

The Bento Gomes River is a river of Mato Grosso state in western Brazil.

== See also ==
- List of rivers of Mato Grosso
