= Dos Patos River (Mato Grosso) =

River in Brazil

Location
- Country: Brazil

Physical characteristics
- Source
  - location: Mato Grosso state
- Mouth
  - coordinates: 13°35′S 56°25′W

The Dos Patos River is a river of Mato Grosso state in western Brazil.

== See also ==
- List of rivers of Mato Grosso
