= Arinos River =

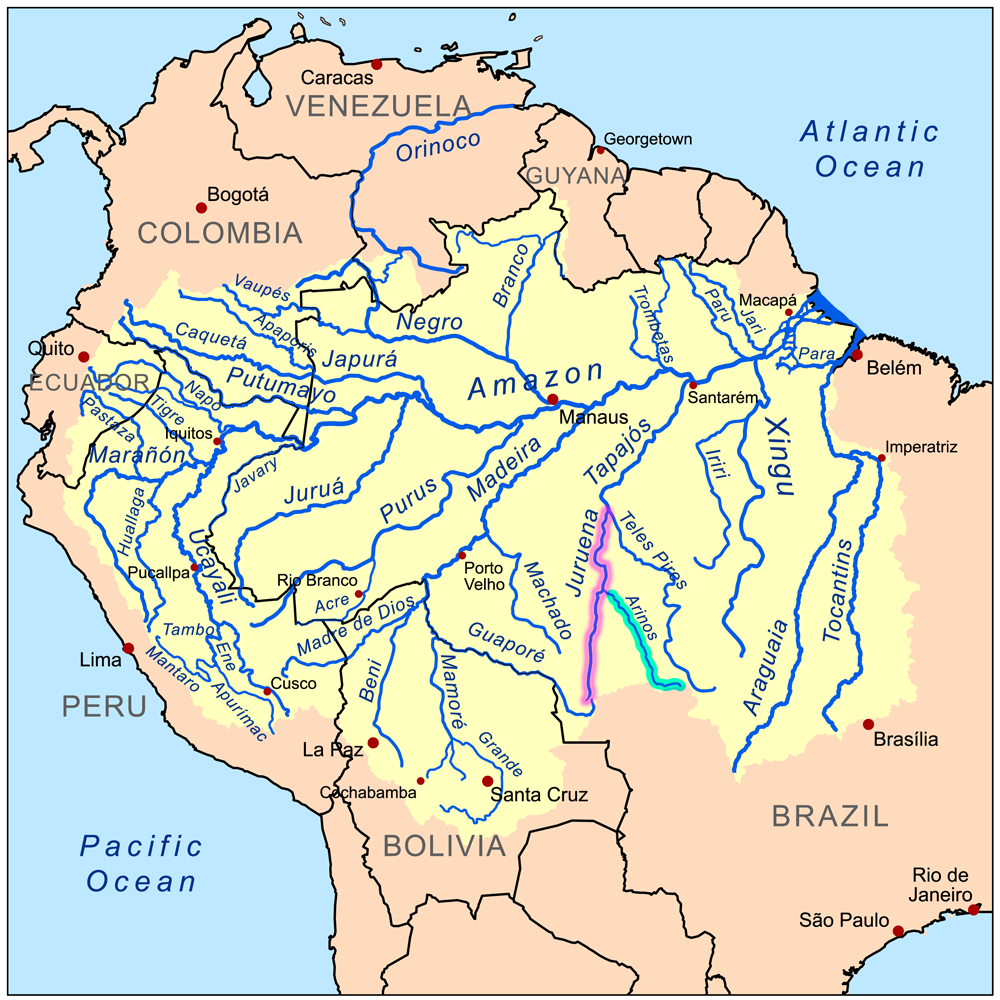
- The Arinos (highlighted in turquoise) empties into the Juruena (pink)

Location
- Country: Brazil
- State: Mato Grosso

Physical characteristics
- Mouth: Juruena River
  - coordinates: 10°24′49″S 58°19′50″W
- Length: 680 km (420 mi)

The Arinos River is a river in Brazil. It is located east of, and empties into, the Juruena River. Some of the Suyá Indians, a Gê-speaking people of central Brazil, migrated from the state of Maranhão to this river.
