= Rio das Mortes =

Location
- Country: Brazil

Physical characteristics
- Source
  - location: Mato Grosso state
- Mouth
  - coordinates: 11°44′S 50°43′W
- Length: 580 km (360 mi)

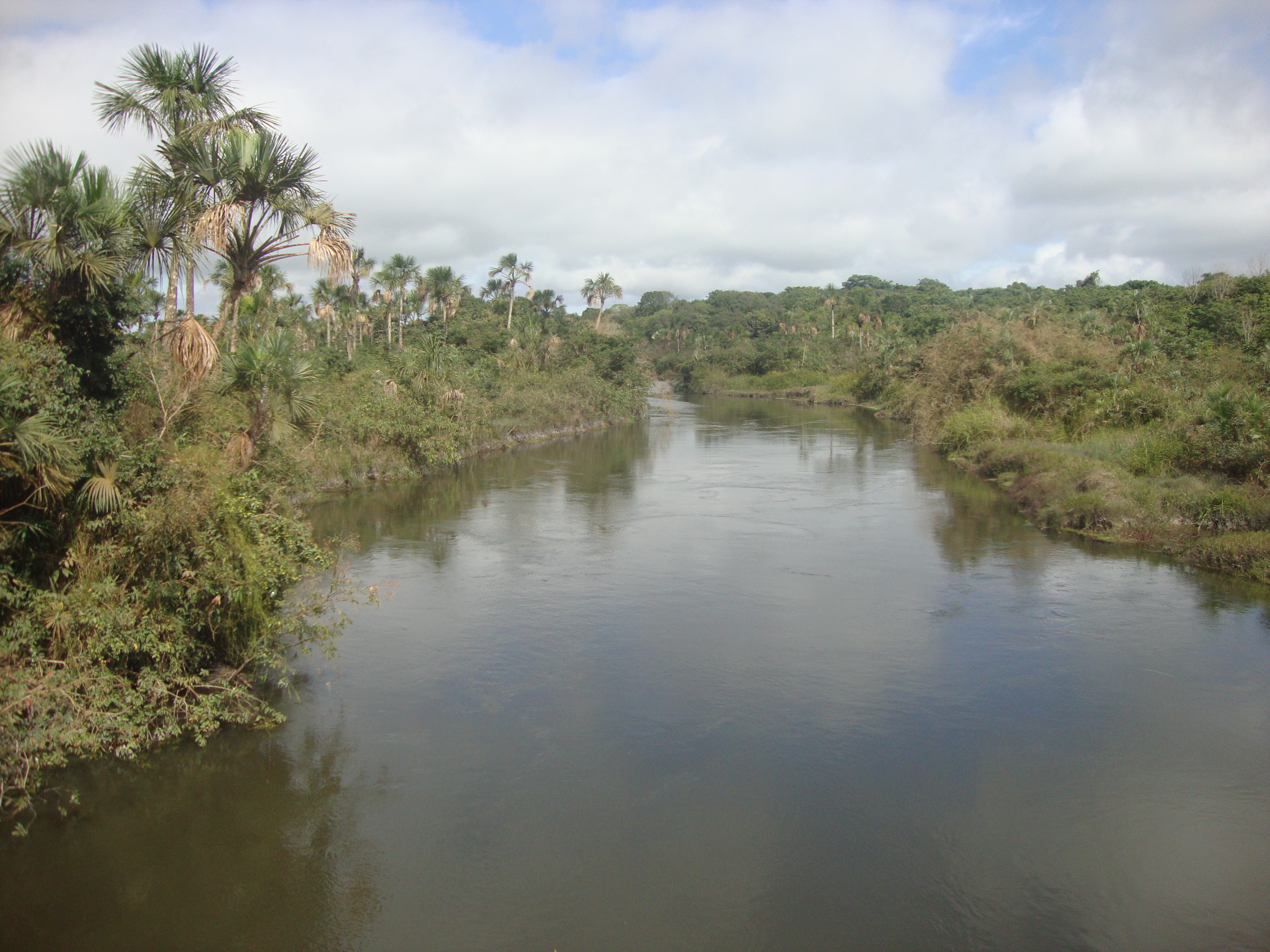

The Rio das Mortes ("River of the Dead") is a river of Mato Grosso state in western Brazil. It has a length of 580 km.

== See also ==
- List of rivers of Mato Grosso
