= Do Sangue River =

Location
- Country: Brazil

Physical characteristics
- Source
  - location: Mato Grosso state
- Mouth
  - location: Juruena River
  - coordinates: 10°57′S 58°21′W

The Do Sangue River is a river of Mato Grosso state in western Brazil. It is a tributary of the Juruena River.

== See also ==
- List of rivers of Mato Grosso
