= Sete de Setembro River =

Coordinates: 12°55′33″S 52°49′33″W

Location
- Country: Brazil

Physical characteristics
- Source
  - location: Mato Grosso state

The Sete de Setembro River is a river of Mato Grosso state in western Brazil.

== See also ==
- List of rivers of Mato Grosso
