= Peixoto de Azevedo River =

Coordinates: 10°03′25″S 55°33′17″W

Location
- Country: Brazil

Physical characteristics
- Source
  - location: Mato Grosso state

The Peixoto de Azevedo River is a river of Mato Grosso state in western Brazil.

== See also ==
- List of rivers of Mato Grosso
