= Das Garças River (Mato Grosso) =

River in Mato Grosso, Brazil

Das Garças River Garças River
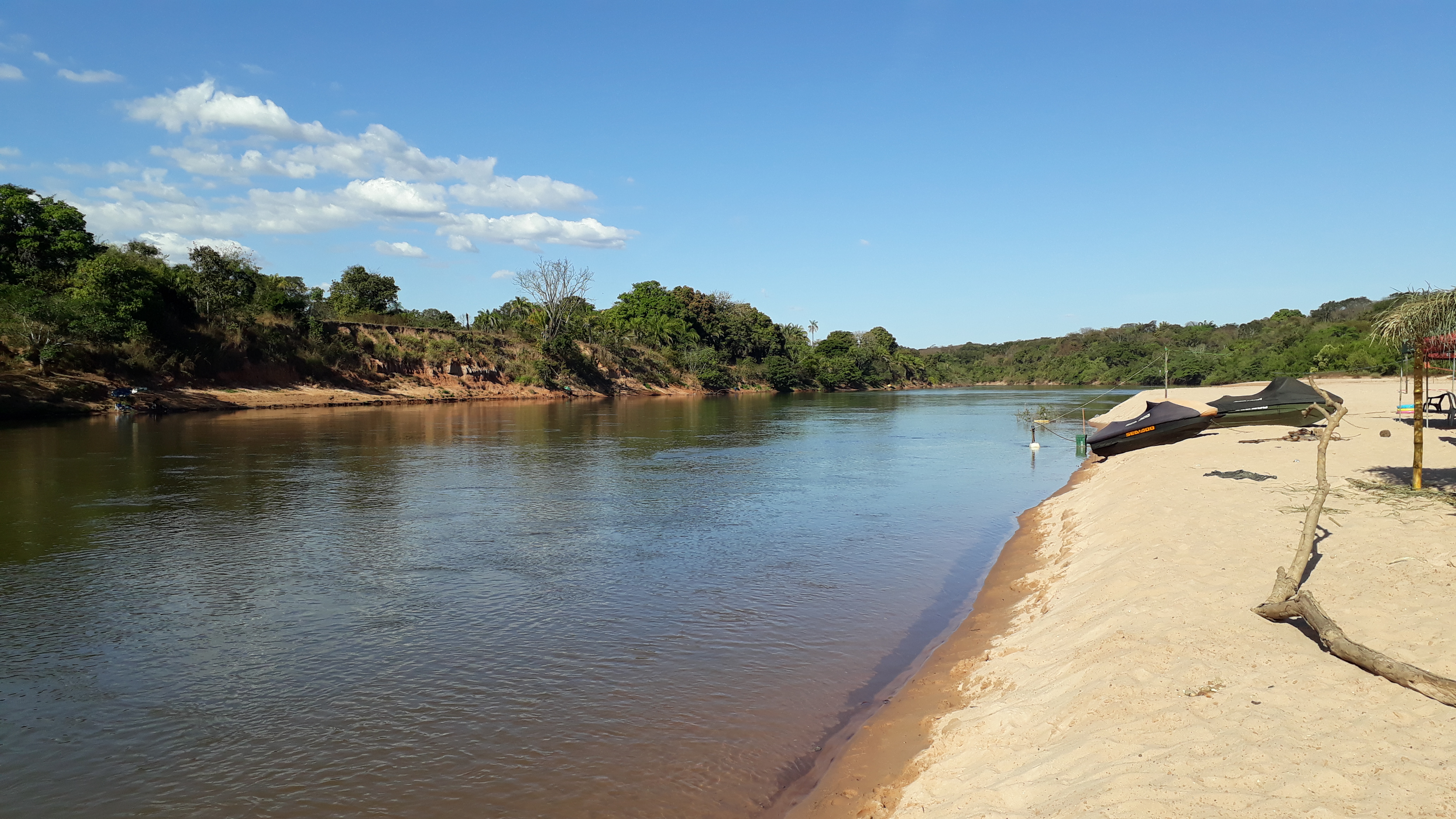

Location
- Country: Brazil
- State: Mato Grosso

Physical characteristics
- Mouth: Araguaia River
  - coordinates: 15°54′S 52°15′W
- Length: 310 km (190 mi)

The Das Garças River is a river in Mato Grosso state in western Brazil. It is close to the Madeira river.

== See also ==
- List of rivers of Mato Grosso
