= Ribeirão do Largo =

- Municipality
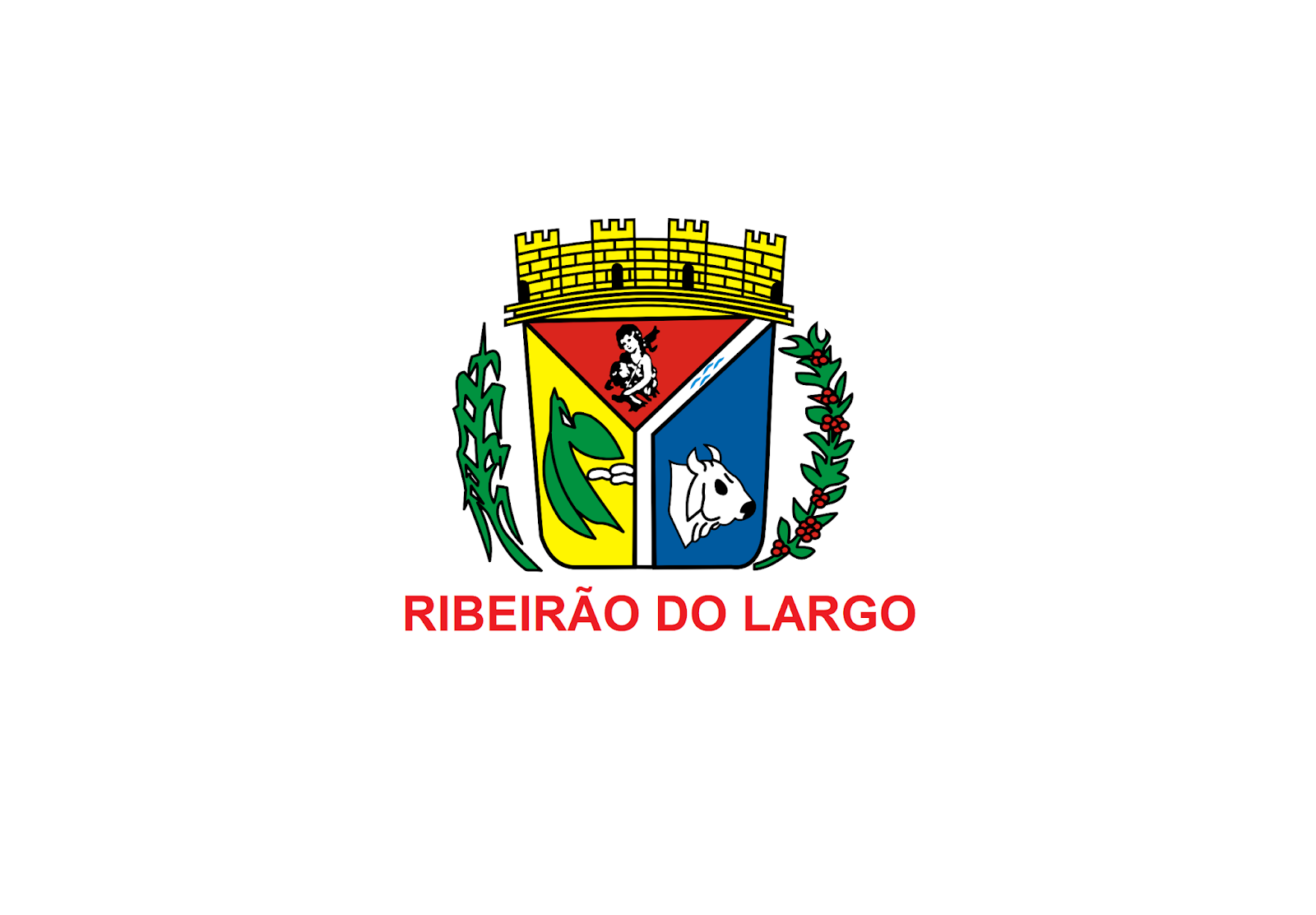
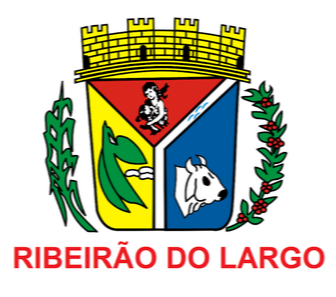
- Flag Coat of arms

- Location in Brazil
- Coordinates: 15°27′32″S 40°44′20″W
- Country: Brazil
- Region: Nordeste
- State: Bahia

Population (2020)
  - Total: 5,343
- Time zone: UTC−3 (BRT)

Ribeirão do Largo is a municipality in the state of Bahia in the North-East region of Brazil.

== See also ==
- List of municipalities in Bahia
