= Itiquira River =

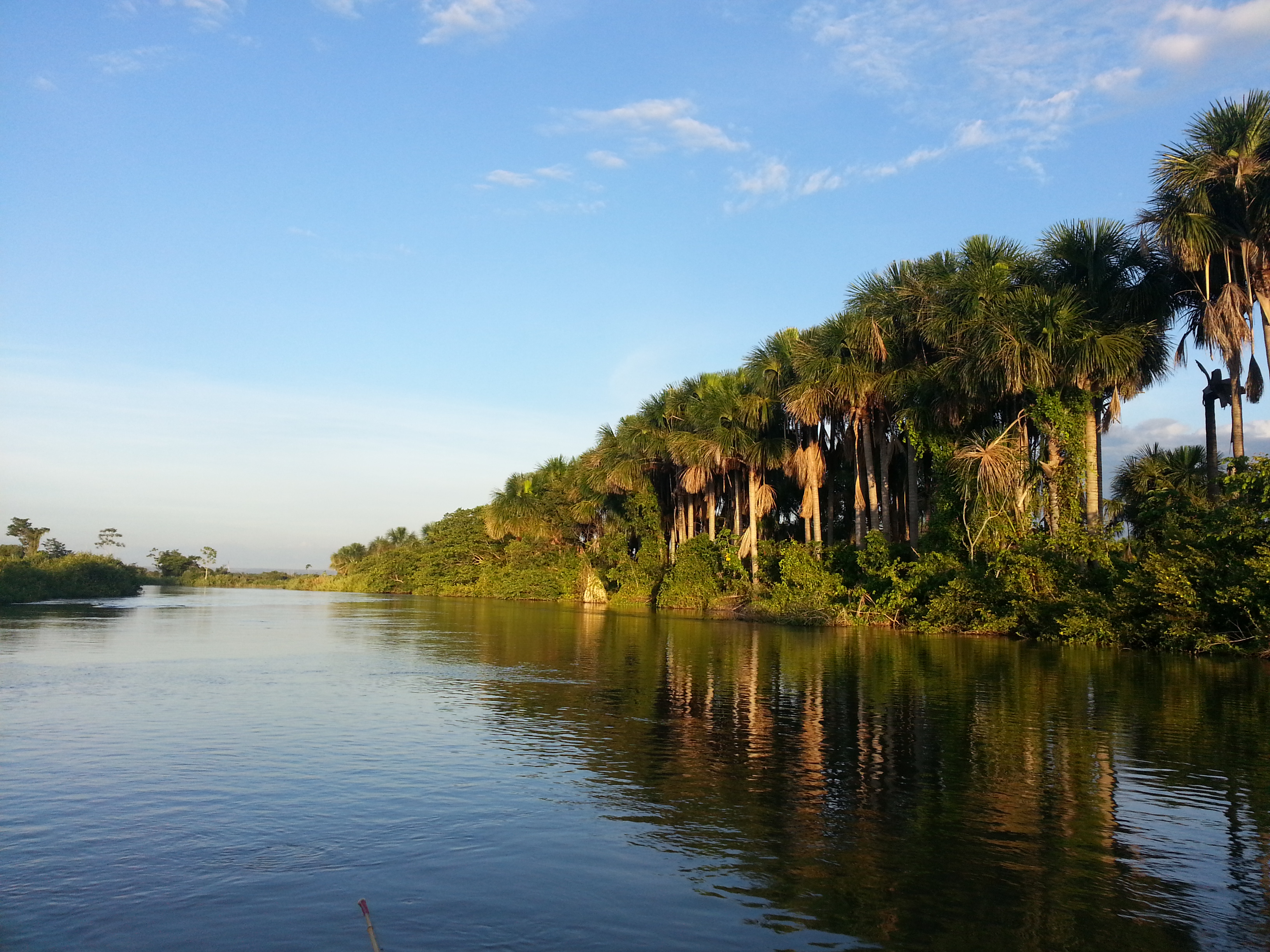

Location
- Country: Brazil

Physical characteristics
- Source
  - location: Mato Grosso state
- Mouth
  - coordinates: 17°22′S 55°36′W

The Itiquira River is a river of Mato Grosso state in western Brazil.

== See also ==
- List of rivers of Mato Grosso
