= Ronuro River =

- Location within Brazil

Location
- Country: Brazil

Physical characteristics
- Source
  - location: Mato Grosso
- Mouth
  - coordinates: 11.940202°S 53.546430°W
- Length: 400

Basin features
- River system: Xingu River

The Ronuro River is a river of Mato Grosso state in western Brazil, a tributary of the Xingu River.

The river drains the 131,795 hectares (325,670 acres) Rio Ronuro Ecological Station, a strictly protected conservation unit created in 1998. It also flows through the Xingu Indigenous Park.

== See also ==
- List of rivers of Mato Grosso
