= Ribeirão Crisóstomo =

Coordinates: 10°19′S 50°26′W

Location
- Country: Brazil

Physical characteristics
- Source
  - location: Mato Grosso state

The Ribeirão Crisóstomo is a river of Mato Grosso state in western Brazil, fed by the Araguaia River

== See also ==
- List of rivers of Mato Grosso

== Bibliography ==
- Brazilian Ministry of Transport
