= Ribeirão Pindaíba =

Location
- Country: Brazil

Physical characteristics
- Source
  - location: Mato Grosso state
- Mouth
  - coordinates: 14°22′S 51°43′W

The Ribeirão Pindaíba is a river of Mato Grosso state in western Brazil.

== See also ==
- List of rivers of Mato Grosso
