= Suia-Miçu River =

River in Mato Grosso, Brazil

Suia Missu River

Location
- Country: Brazil

Physical characteristics
- Mouth: Xingu River
  - coordinates: 11°13′04″S 53°14′45″W
- Length: 450 km (280 mi)

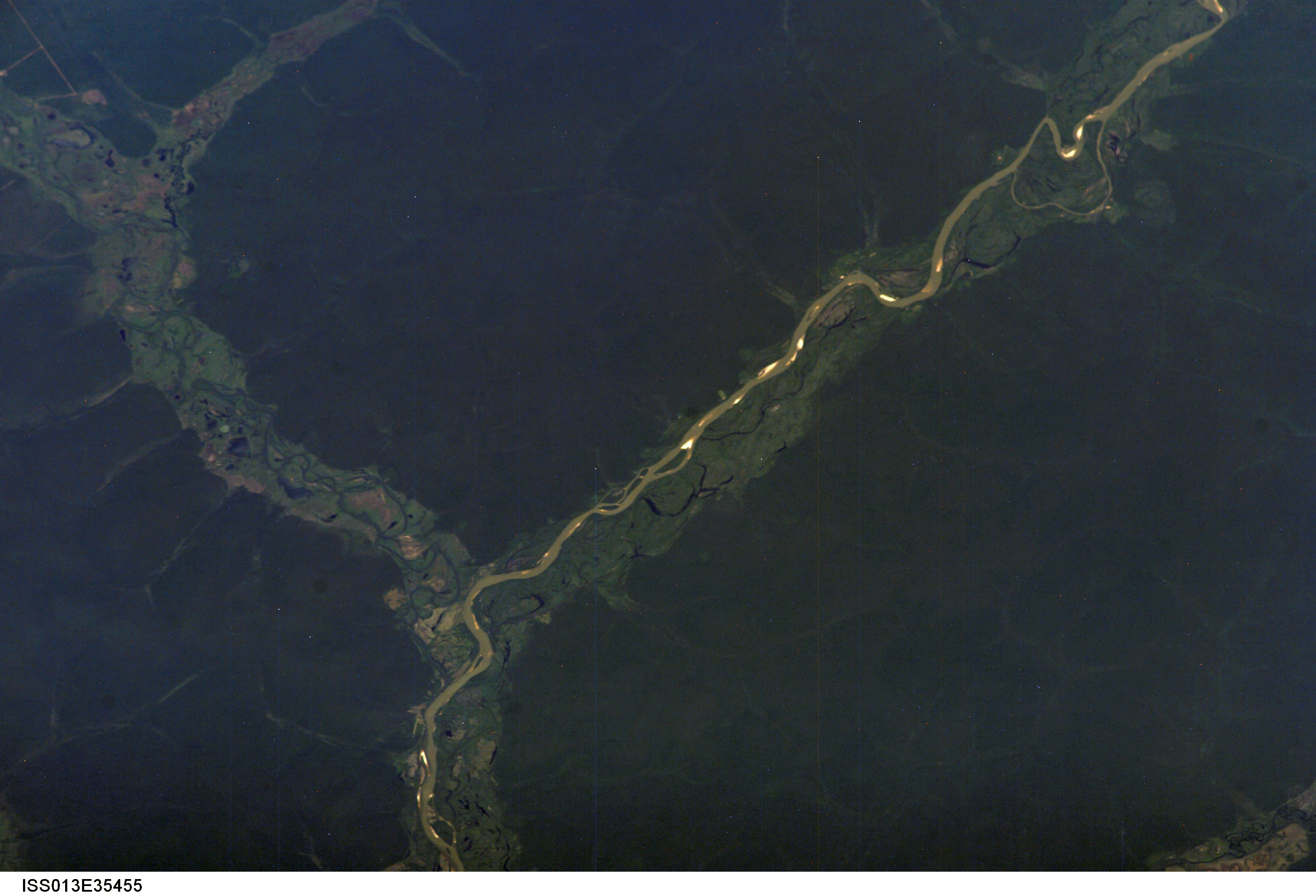

The Suia-Miçu River (or Suia Missu River) is a river of Mato Grosso state in western Brazil.

== See also ==
- List of rivers of Mato Grosso
