= Jauru River (Mato Grosso) =

Coordinates: 16°20′41″S 57°46′55″W

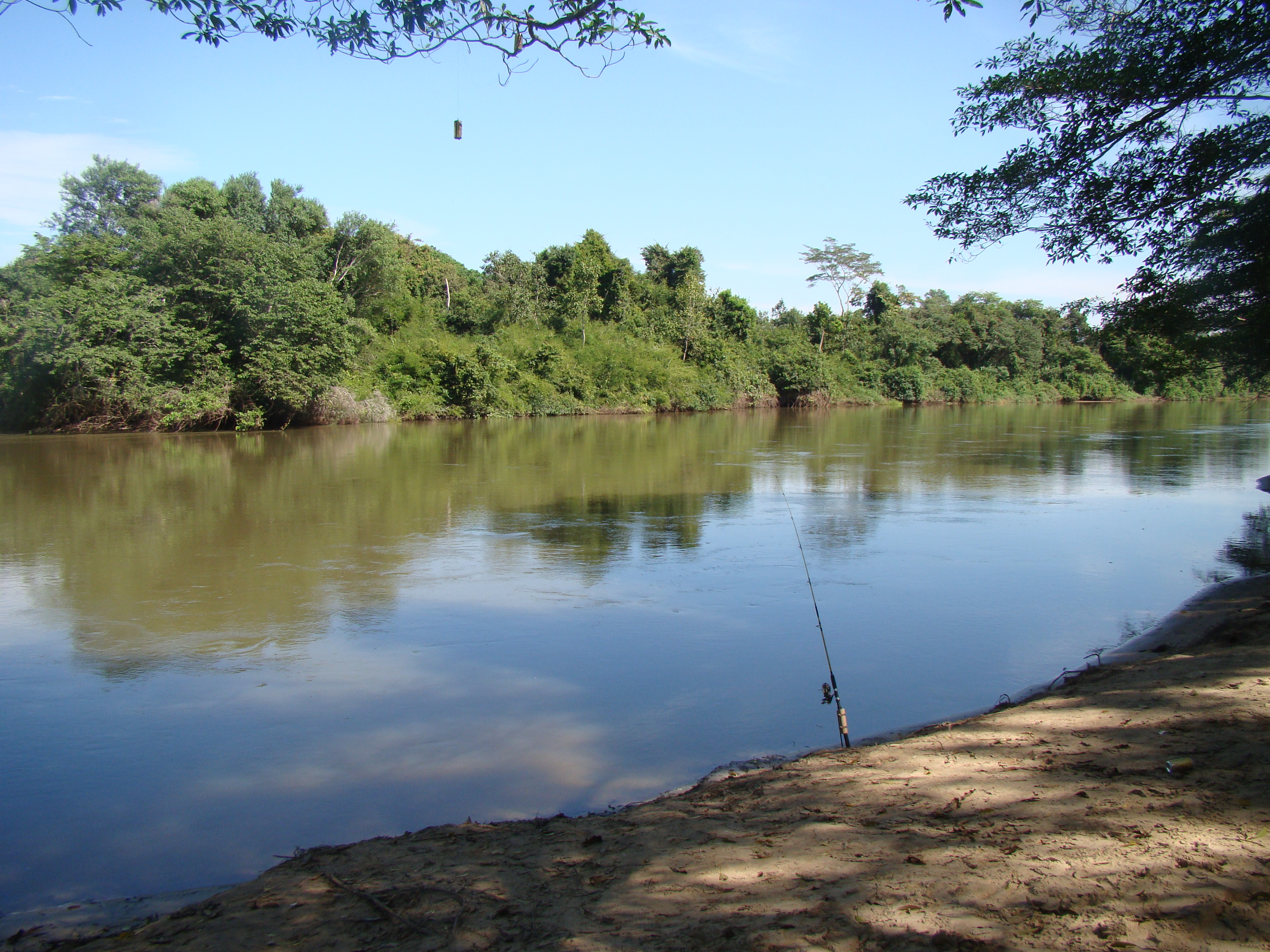

Location
- Country: Brazil

Physical characteristics
- Source
  - location: Mato Grosso state
- Mouth
  - location: Paraguay River

The Jauru River (Portuguese, Rio Jauru) is a river in Mato Grosso, a state in western Brazil. It is a tributary of the Paraguay River.

== See also ==
- List of rivers of Mato Grosso
