= Ribeirão Auiia =

Location
- Country: Brazil

Physical characteristics
- Source
  - location: Mato Grosso state
- Mouth
  - coordinates: 12°9′S 53°20′W

The Ribeirão Auiia is a river of Mato Grosso state in western Brazil.

== See also ==
- List of rivers of Mato Grosso
