= Diamantino River =

Diamantino River (Mato Grosso)

Location
- Country: Brazil

Physical characteristics
- Source
  - location: Mato Grosso state
- Mouth
  - coordinates: 16°7′S 52°28′W

The Diamantino River is a river of Mato Grosso state in western Brazil.

== See also ==
- List of rivers of Mato Grosso
