= Diamantino =

- Municipality
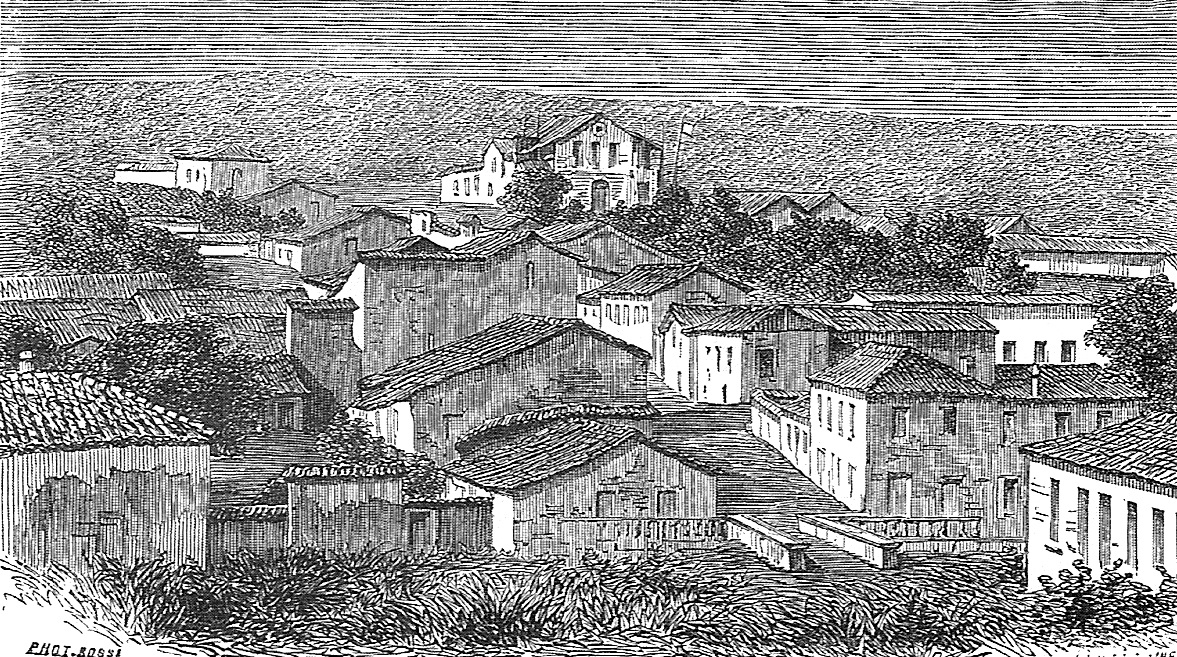
- Diamantino in 1863

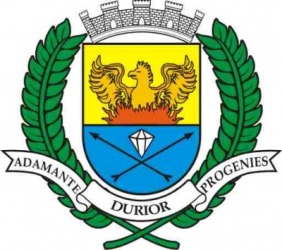
- Flag Coat of arms
- Motto: Adamante Durior Progenies (Latin); People tough as diamond
- Location in Mato Grosso state

- Location in Brazil
- Coordinates: 14°24′32″S 56°26′45″W
- Country: Brazil
- Region: Central-West
- State: Mato Grosso
- Foundation: September 18, 1728

Government
  - Mayor: Manoel Loureiro Neto (MDB)
- Elevation: 560 m (1,840 ft)

Population (2020)
  - Total: 22,178
- Time zone: UTC−3 (BRT)

Diamantino is a municipality in the state of Mato Grosso in Brazil. It has a population of 22,178 and is located near Diamantino River. It lies 1,837 feet (560 m) above sea-level, and sits at the foot of the Mato Grosso plateau. Its history dates back to 1730, when it was established as a gold mining settlement. In 1746, diamonds were discovered, causing the town's population to swell and prosper. However, the quantity of diamonds was greatly overestimated, and the town's population steadily declined.

Near the city lies the South American pole of inaccessibility, which means that no place in South America is as far from the nearest ocean as this point. The closest ocean is the Pacific Ocean, at the Peruvian-Chilean border.

== Climate ==
Climate data for Diamantino (1981–2010)
Month	Jan	Feb	Mar	Apr	May	Jun	Jul	Aug	Sep	Oct	Nov	Dec	Year
Mean daily maximum °C (°F)	32.0 (89.6)	32.2 (90.0)	32.4 (90.3)	32.6 (90.7)	31.6 (88.9)	31.7 (89.1)	32.2 (90.0)	34.3 (93.7)	34.4 (93.9)	34.0 (93.2)	33.0 (91.4)	32.2 (90.0)	32.7 (90.9)
Daily mean °C (°F)	25.9 (78.6)	25.8 (78.4)	25.8 (78.4)	25.6 (78.1)	23.9 (75.0)	22.9 (73.2)	22.6 (72.7)	24.7 (76.5)	26.1 (79.0)	26.7 (80.1)	26.4 (79.5)	26.1 (79.0)	25.2 (77.4)
Mean daily minimum °C (°F)	22.1 (71.8)	22.0 (71.6)	21.9 (71.4)	21.2 (70.2)	19.0 (66.2)	17.6 (63.7)	16.4 (61.5)	18.2 (64.8)	20.5 (68.9)	21.9 (71.4)	22.1 (71.8)	22.2 (72.0)	20.4 (68.7)
Average precipitation mm (inches)	299.5 (11.79)	302.1 (11.89)	271.1 (10.67)	130.8 (5.15)	49.1 (1.93)	14.1 (0.56)	10.4 (0.41)	24.4 (0.96)	73.6 (2.90)	170.2 (6.70)	222.1 (8.74)	263.7 (10.38)	1,831.1 (72.09)
Average precipitation days (≥ 1.0 mm)	19	17	17	11	4	1	1	2	4	11	13	16	116
Average relative humidity (%)	85.0	84.9	85.9	83.6	79.8	75.0	68.8	61.0	66.0	76.1	80.4	82.9	77.5
Source: Instituto Nacional de Meteorologia
