= Liberdade River (Xingu River tributary) =

Location
- Country: Brazil

Physical characteristics
- Mouth: Xingu River
  - coordinates: 9°39′S 52°11′W

The Liberdade River is a river in the states of Mato Grosso and Pará, Brazil.

The Liberdade River is a right-bank tributary of the Xingu River. It joins the middle course of the Xingu in the region of southern Pará and northern Mato Grosso. The river is reported to be approximately 450 kilometres long.
