= Manissauá-Miçu River =

Coordinates: 10°57′33″S 53°19′19″W

Location
- Country: Brazil

Physical characteristics
- Source
  - location: Mato Grosso state

The Manissauá-Miçu River is a river of Mato Grosso state in western Brazil.

== See also ==
- List of rivers of Mato Grosso
- Manitsauá language
