= Apiacá River =

Location
- Country: Brazil

Physical characteristics
- Source
  - location: Mato Grosso state
- Mouth
  - coordinates: 9°11′S 57°4′W

The Apiacá River is a river of Mato Grosso state in western Brazil. It serves as a significant tributary in the region and is part of the broader Amazon basin system

== Geography ==
- Mato Grosso, Brazil
- Stream (body of running water)
- Rio Apiaca, Rio das Apiacas, Rio das Apiacás
- the river flows through a region characterized by dense Amazonian forest and is surrounded by areas of high ecological importance.

Its course and basin contribute to the hydrological network that feeds into larger rivers in the Amazon system, such as the Juruena and Teles Pires rivers.

== See also ==
- List of rivers of Mato Grosso
