= Paranatinga =

Coordinates: 14.4319°S 54.0508°W

- Municipality
- Location in Mato Grosso
- Country: Brazil
- Region: Center-West
- State: Mato Grosso
- Mesoregion: Norte Mato-Grossense

Population (2020)
  - Total: 22,861
- Time zone: UTC−3 (BRT)

Paranatinga is a municipality in the state of Mato Grosso in the Central-West Region of Brazil.

The municipality contains the 3,900 hectares (9,600 acres) Culuene Biological Reserve, created in 1898.

As of 2021, people are creating a new municipality out of the northern parts of Paranatinga to be called "Santiago do Norte".

== See also ==
- List of municipalities in Mato Grosso
