= Juruena River =

River in Brazil

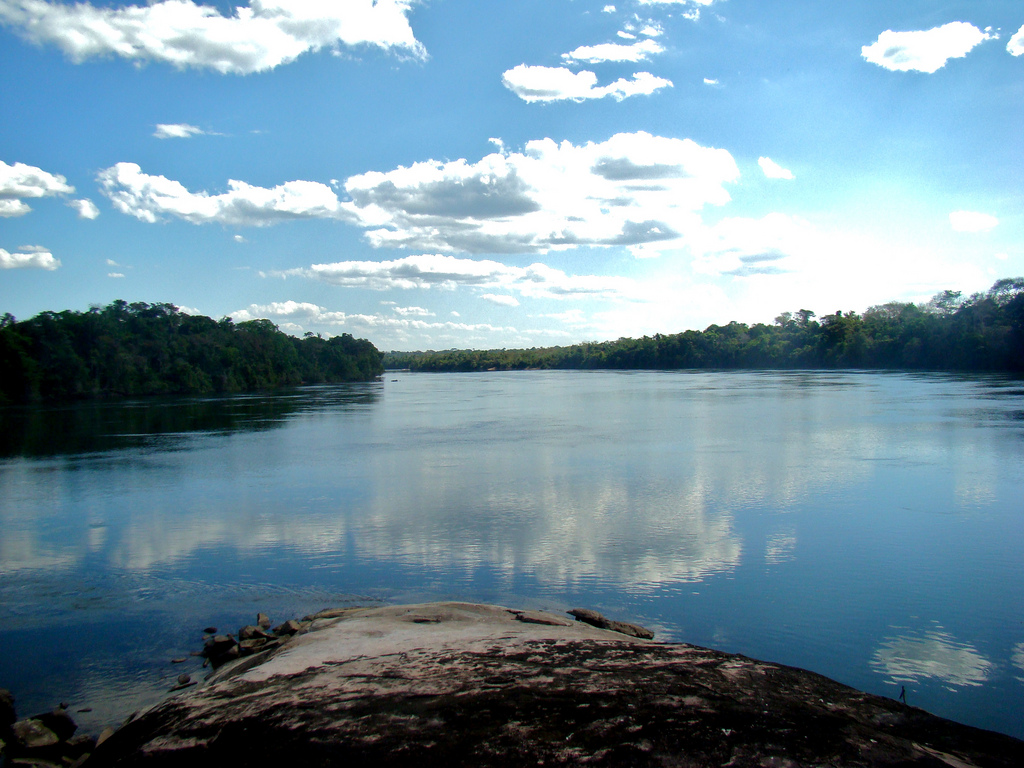

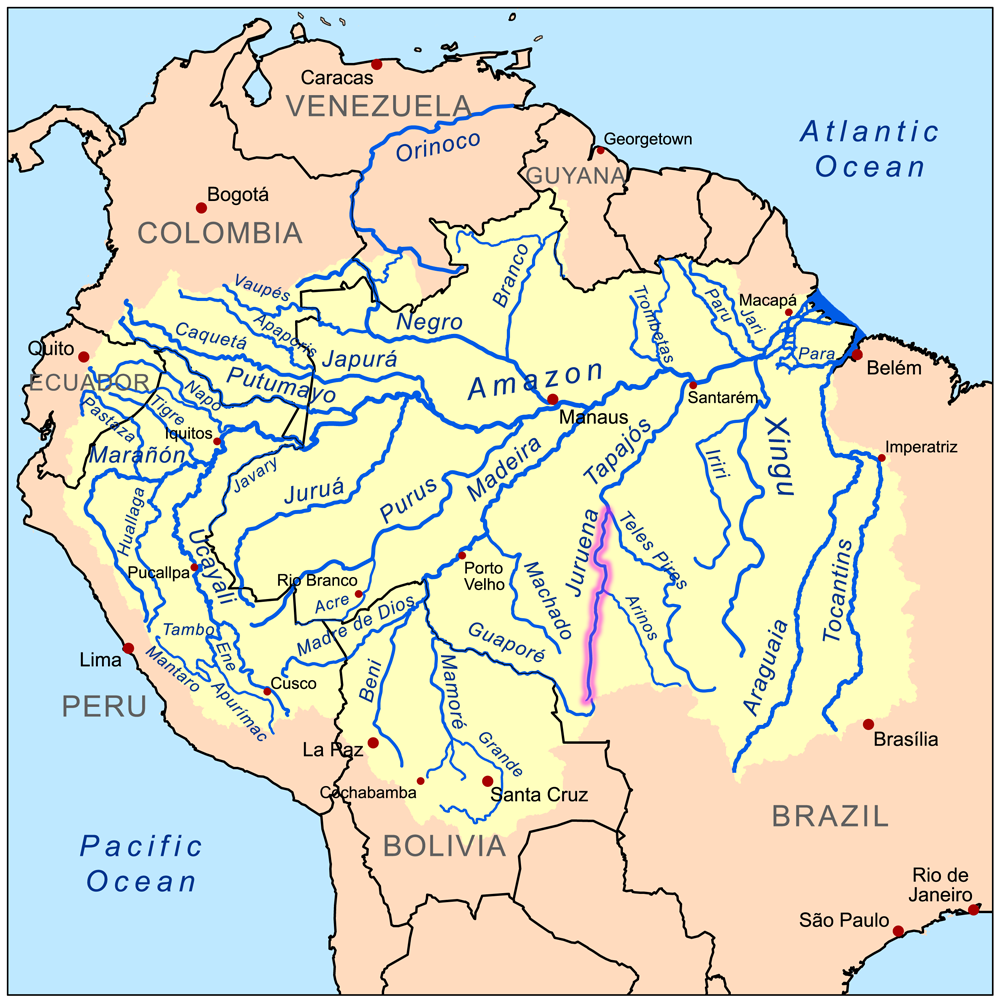
- Amazon Basin with the Juruena River highlighted

- Location within Brazil

Location
- Country: Brazil

Physical characteristics
- Source
  - location: Parecis plateau, Mato Grosso, Brazil
  - coordinates: 14°43′6.0168″S 59°9′45.7848″W
  - elevation: 653 m (2,142 ft)
- Mouth: Tapajós
  - location: Amazonas–Mato Grosso, Brazil
  - coordinates: 7°20′54.5856″S 58°8′11.9184″W
  - elevation: 100 m (330 ft)
- Length: 1,240 km (770 mi)
- Basin size: 191,780.7 km^{2} (74,046.9 mi^{2}) to 192,628 km^{2} (74,374 mi^{2})
- Discharge
  - location: Confluence of Teles Pires
  - average: (Period: 1970-2000)4,458.513 m^{3}/s (157,450.9 cu ft/s) (Period: 1979-2015)4,936.7 m^{3}/s (174,340 cu ft/s)
  - minimum: 1,766 m^{3}/s (62,400 cu ft/s)
  - maximum: 11,348 m^{3}/s (400,800 cu ft/s)

Basin features
- Tributaries
  - left: Vermelho, Juína-Mirim, Camararé, Juína, Bararati
  - right: São Tomé, São João da Barra, Arinos, Sangue, Papagaio

The Juruena River (Portuguese: Rio Juruena) is a 1,240 km (770 mi) long river in west-central Brazil, in the state of Mato Grosso.

== Course ==
The Juruena originates in the Parecis plateau. Within Mato Grosso the river defines the eastern boundary of the 227,817 hectares (562,950 acres) Igarapés do Juruena State Park, created in 2002. For the last 190 km (120 mi) of its lower part the river becomes the border between the states Mato Grosso and Amazonas. In this section the river forms the boundary between the Sucunduri State Park to the west in Amazonas and the Juruena National Park to the east in Mato Grosso. In the north of this section it forms the boundary between the Bararati Sustainable Development Reserve in Amazonas and the Apiacás Ecological Reserve in Mato Grosso.

The Juruena finally joins the Teles Pires river to form the Tapajós river, which is one of the biggest tributaries to the Amazon River. The Juruena River is not fully navigable due to its many waterfalls and rapids. The river is known for the Salto Augusto Falls.

== Sources ==
- "Juruena River". Encyclopædia Britannica. Encyclopædia Britannica Inc. 2015. Archived from the original on 8 February 2011.
- PES do Sucunduri (in Portuguese), ISA: Instituto Socioambiental
- PES Igarapés do Juruena (in Portuguese), ISA: Instituto Socioambiental
- RDS Bararati (in Portuguese), ISA: Instituto Socioambiental
- Ziesler, R.; Ardizzone, G.D. (1979), "Amazon River System", The Inland waters of Latin America, Food and Agriculture Organization of the United Nations, ISBN 92-5-000780-9, archived from the original on 21 October 2013
