= Xingu River =

Tributary river of the Amazon

Xingu River Rio Xingu (Portuguese)
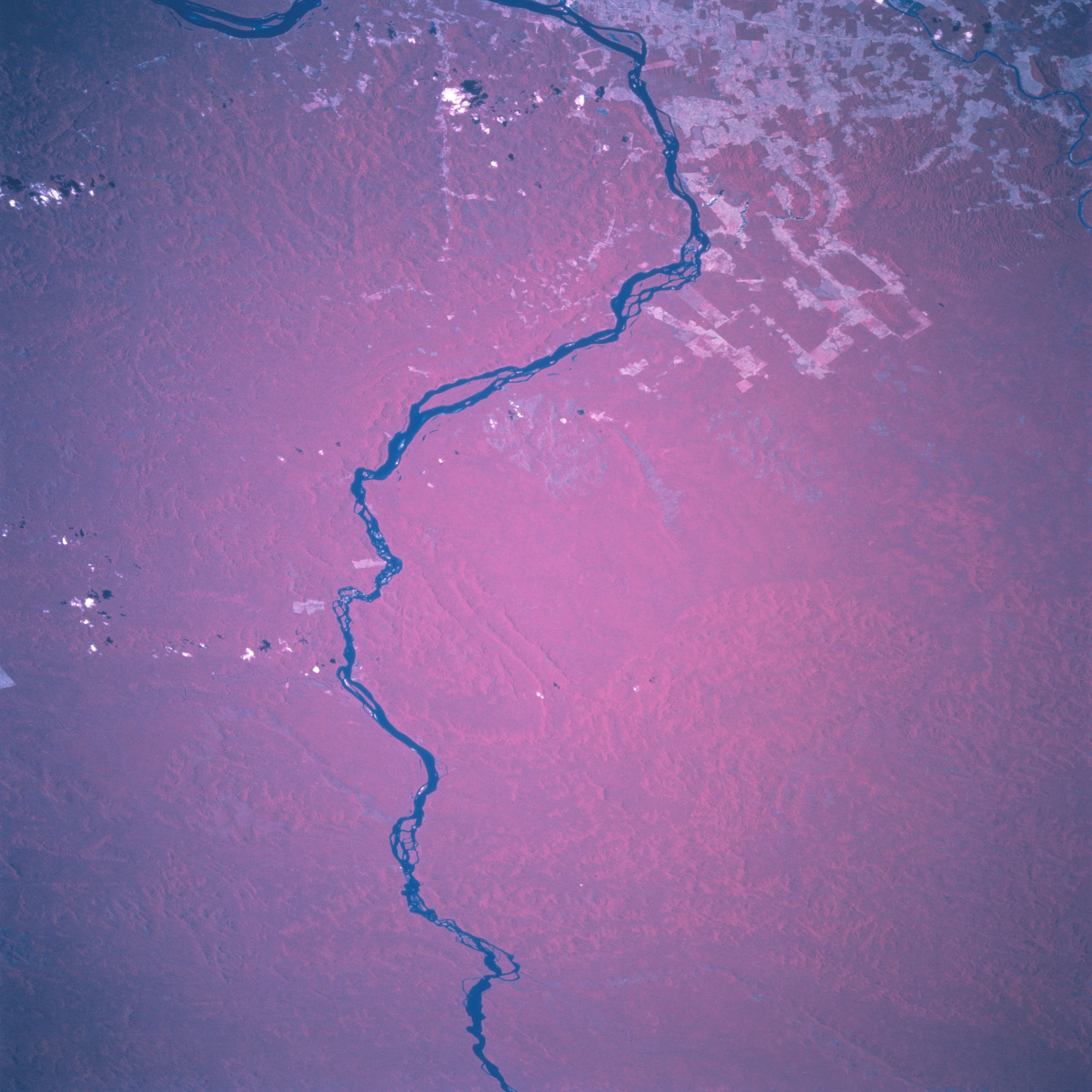
- Xingu River from space, downstream section.

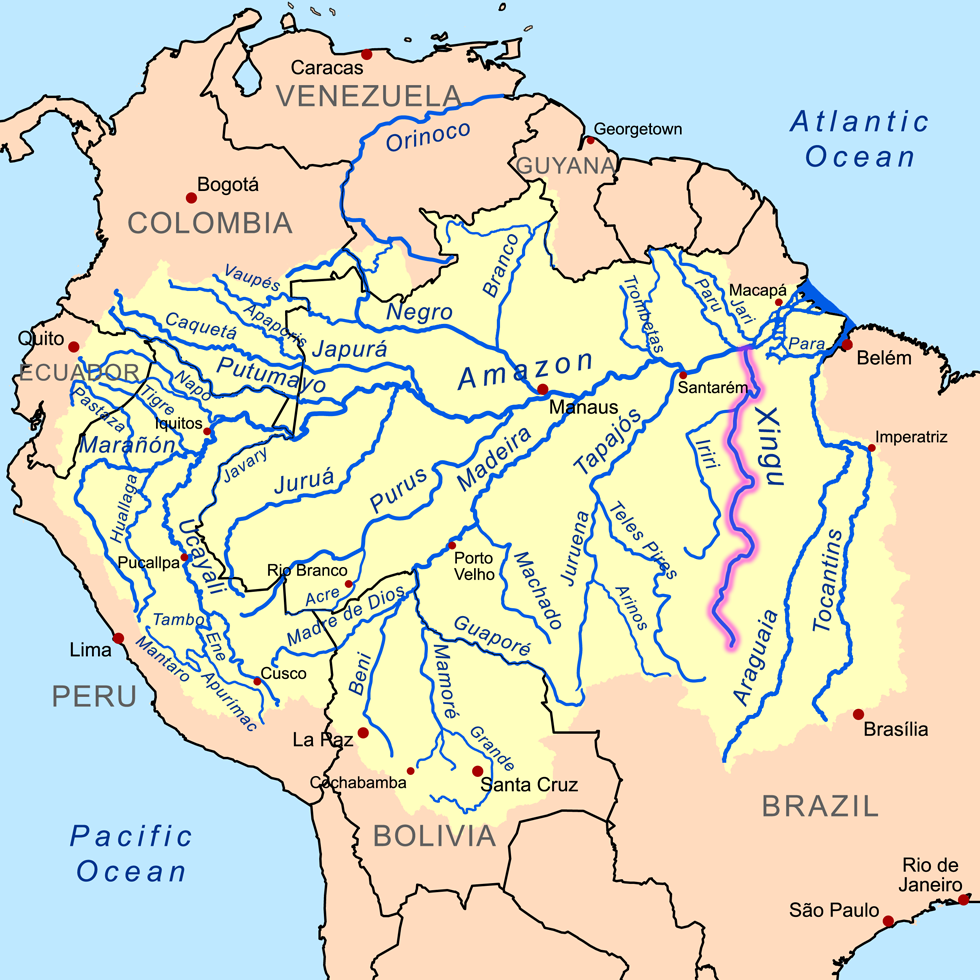
- Map of the Amazon Basin with the Xingu River highlighted
- Native name: Byti (Kayapó)

Location
- Country: Brazil

Physical characteristics
- Source: Culuene and Sete de Setembro confluence
  - location: Mato Grosso
  - coordinates: 12°55′29.7264″S 52°49′33.636″W
  - elevation: 297 m (974 ft)
- 2nd source: Sete de Setembro
  - location: Mato Grosso
  - coordinates: 14°10′13.6956″S 52°45′47.6496″W
  - elevation: 477 m (1,565 ft)
- 3rd source: Culuene
  - location: Mato Grosso
  - coordinates: 14°46′50.0412″S 54°31′7.5324″W
  - elevation: 753 m (2,470 ft)
- Mouth: Amazon River
  - coordinates: 1°31′37.8012″S 51°52′8.9616″W
  - elevation: 0 m (0 ft)
- Length: 1,640 km (1,020 mi)
- Basin size: 520,292 km^{2} (200,886 mi^{2}) 513,313.5 km^{2} (198,191.5 mi^{2})
- Discharge
  - location: Near mouth, Pará State
  - average: (Period: 1973–1990)9,680 m^{3}/s (342,000 cu ft/s) (Period: 1971–2000)10,022.6 m^{3}/s (353,940 cu ft/s)
- Discharge
  - location: Altamira, Pará State (Basin size: 449,493 km^{2} (173,550 sq mi)
  - average: (Period: 1971–2000)8,345.8 m^{3}/s (294,730 cu ft/s) (Period: 1970–1996)8,665 m^{3}/s (306,000 cu ft/s)
- Discharge
  - location: Belo Horizonte, Pará State (Basin size: 277,265 km^{2} (107,053 sq mi)
  - average: (Period: 1971–2000)5,234.1 m^{3}/s (184,840 cu ft/s) (Period: 1970–1996)5,324 m^{3}/s (188,000 cu ft/s)
- Discharge
  - location: São Félix do Xingu, Pará State (Basin size: 250,626 km^{2} (96,767 sq mi)
  - average: (Period: 1971–2000)4,660.3 m^{3}/s (164,580 cu ft/s) (Period: 1970–1996)4,627 m^{3}/s (163,400 cu ft/s)

Basin features
- Progression: Amazon → Atlantic Ocean
- River system: Amazon
- Tributaries
  - left: Culuene, Curisevo, Tamitatoale, Ronuro, Manissauá-Miçu, Iriri, Pardo, Jaraucu
  - right: Sete de Setembro, Suia-Miçu, Liberdade, Fresco, Bacaja, Comandante Fontoura River

The Xingu River (/ʃɪŋˈɡuː/, shing-GOO; Portuguese: Rio Xingu [ˈʁi.u ʃĩˈɡu]; Mẽbêngôkre: Byti [bɯˈti]) is a 1,640 km (1,020 mi) river in north Brazil. It is a southeast tributary of the Amazon River and one of the largest clearwater rivers in the Amazon basin, accounting for about 5% of its water.

== Description and history ==
The first Indigenous Park in Brazil was created in the river basin by the Brazilian government in the early 1960s. This park marks the first indigenous territory recognized by the Brazilian government and it was the world's largest indigenous preserve on the date of its creation. Currently, fourteen tribes live within Xingu Indigenous Park, surviving on natural resources and extracting from the river most of what they need for food and water.

The Brazilian government built the Belo Monte Dam on the Lower Xingu, which began operations in 2019 and is the world's fifth-largest hydroelectric dam. Construction of this dam was under legal challenge by environment and indigenous groups, who assert the dam would have negative environmental and social impacts along with reducing the flow by up to 80% along a 100 km (60 mi) stretch known as the Volta Grande ("Big Bend"). The river flow in this stretch is highly complex and includes major sections of rapids. More than 450 fish species have been documented in the Xingu River Basin and it is estimated that the total is around 600 fish species, including many endemics. At least 193 fish species living in rapids are known from the lower Xingu, and at least 26 of these are endemic. From 2008 to 2018 alone, 24 new fish species have been described from the river. Many species are seriously threatened by the dam, which will significantly alter the flow in the Volta Grande rapids.

Rio Mira-sol, a second-tributary of the Xingu River in Mato Grosso

In the Upper Xingu region was a highly self-organized pre-Columbian anthropogenic landscape, including deposits of fertile agricultural terra preta, black soil in Portuguese, with a network of roads and polities each of which covered about 250 square kilometers.

Near the source of Xingu River is Culuene River, a 600 kilometres (370 mi) tributary.

== In popular culture ==
- The name is the title of a humorous Edith Wharton short story from 1911.
- "Xingu" is the title of a song on Waterfall Cities, a 1999 album by Ozric Tentacles.
- The river is also honoured in the album Aguas da Amazonia.
- A beer produced near the river is sold in the international market under the name "Xingu".
- In the novel Relic by Douglas Preston and Lincoln Child, the Xingu River is the location of the doomed Whittlesey/Maxwell expedition responsible for discovering evidence of the lost Kothoga tribe and their savage god Mbwun.
- Xingu is a 2011 Brazilian movie, directed by Brazilian film-maker Cao Hamburger. The movie tells the story of the Villas-Bôas brothers 1943 expedition to the region, which led to the creation of the indigenous reserve twenty years later.
- The Embraer Xingu is a design of twin-engine airplane manufactured in the 1970s by Brazilian company Embraer.

== See also ==
- Percy Fawcett
- Aloysius Pendergast
- Xingu Indigenous Park
- Xingu peoples
