= Ribeirão da Paz =

Coordinates: 9°14′S 52°01′W

Location
- Country: Brazil

Physical characteristics
- Source
  - location: Pará state

The Ribeirão da Paz is a river of Pará state in north-central Brazil.

== See also ==
- List of rivers of Pará
