= Aripuanã =

Coordinates: 10°10′01″S 59°27′32″W

- Municipality
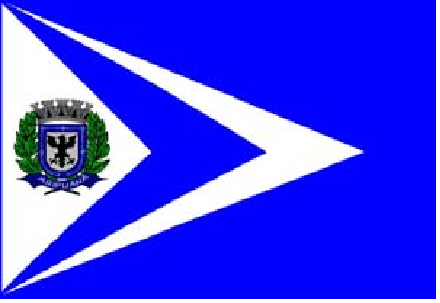
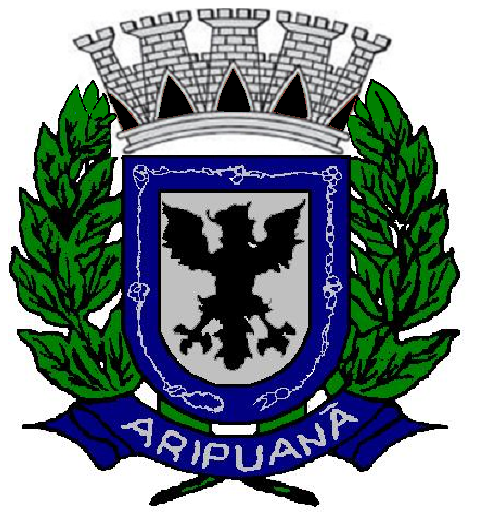
- Flag Coat of arms

- Location in Mato Grosso
- Country: Brazil
- Region: Center-West
- State: Mato Grosso
- Mesoregion: Norte Mato-Grossense
- Established: 1943

Area
  - Total: 96.714 sq mi (250.489 km^{2})
- Elevation: 344 ft (105 m)

Population (2020)
  - Total: 22,714
  - Density: 190/sq mi (74/km^{2})
- Time zone: UTC−3 (BRT)

Aripuanã is a municipality in the state of Mato Grosso in the Central-West Region of Brazil. It is located on the banks of the Aripuanã River.

The city is served by Aripuanã Airport.

The municipality contains the 8,517 hectares (21,050 acres) Rio Flor do Prado Ecological Station, a fully protected environmental unit created in 2003. It also holds part of the 164,224 hectares (405,810 acres) Guariba-Roosevelt Extractive Reserve, a sustainable use unit created in 1996.
