= Manso Dam =

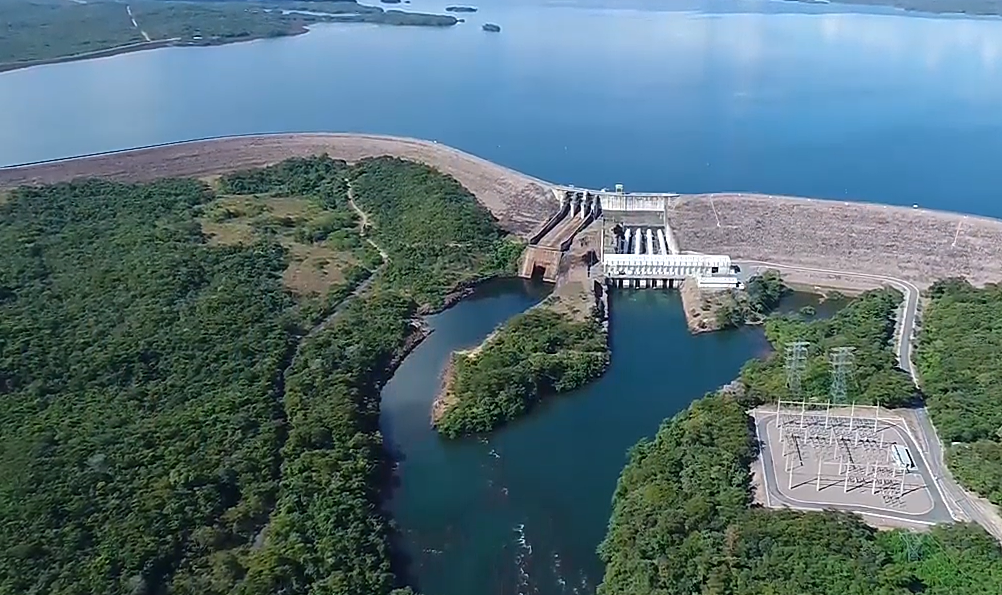

- Location within Brazil
- Official name: Represa de Manso
- Country: Brazil
- Location: Rosário Oeste, Mato Grosso, Brazil
- Coordinates: 14.870897°S 55.785176°W
- Purpose: Hydroelectric power
- Status: Operational
- Construction began: 1988
- Opening date: 1999

Dam and spillways
- Impounds: Manso River; Roncador River; Casca River
- Height: 72 m (236 ft)
- Length: 3,680 m (12,070 ft)
- Spillway capacity: 2,990 m^{3}/s (106,000 cu ft/s)

Reservoir
- Total capacity: 7,300,000,000 m^{3} (5,900,000 acre⋅ft)
- Catchment area: 9,365 km^{2} (3,616 mi^{2})
- Surface area: 427 km^{2} (165 mi^{2})

Usina Hidrelétrica de Manso
- Hydraulic head: 57.5 m (189 ft) (net)
- Turbines: 4 x 53 MW Francis-type
- Installed capacity: 212 MW
- Capacity factor: 43%

The Manso Dam (Portuguese: Represa de Manso) is a hydroelectric dam on the Manso River, a tributary of the Cuiabá River, in the state of Mato Grosso, Brazil. Completed in 1999, it generates enough electricity for 300,000 people, and the reservoir is a tourist attraction. The dam displaced many families from the area now covered by the reservoir, and the submerged, decaying vegetation has had negative impact on water quality in and below the dam, affecting edible fish stocks.

== Location ==
The dam impounds the Manso River in the upper Paraguay sub-basin of the Paraná basin. The reservoir is in the municipalities of Chapada dos Guimarães and Rosário Oeste in the midwest region of Mato Grosso. It is the largest in the Paraopeba system. The dam is 86 kilometres (53 mi) from Cuiabá, the state capital, along good roads. It is about 360 metres (1,180 ft) above sea level. The lake has become a tourist attraction.

== Structure ==
The dam project was launched in 1974, when a flood of the Cuiabá River left more than 20% of the population of the state capital homeless. The objective was to control flooding while generating electricity, developing tourism and supporting irrigation. Construction began in 1988 and was completed in 1999. The dam has a height of 72 metres (236 ft). 200,000 cubic metres (7,100,000 cu ft) of concrete were used in construction. Total cost was R$340 million. The reservoir covers an area of 427 square kilometres (165 sq mi). It was full in 2001.

The operating contract is 70% owned by Eletrobras Furnas. Installed capacity is 212 MW, with guaranteed output of 92 MW. It can meet the power demands of 300,000 people. After an extended drought, in December 2015 the water level had fallen to 28.7% of capacity. However, record rainfall raised it to 76% by June 2016. At 70% capacity the water line is 6.59 metres (21.6 ft) above the minimum operating level.

== Social and environmental impact ==
Relatively little information was provided about the dam to the affected people in Mato Grosso. 109 properties were requisitioned for the project, and between 652 and 1,065 families were displaced. The displaced families were settled in areas with sandy soil, unsuitable for agriculture, and given insanitary straw shacks as homes.

The reservoir submerged a significant quantity of biomass, which was not cleared before construction started. This reduces dissolved oxygen levels as it decays and encourages proliferation of water weeds. Rather than use a surface-level channel to divert excess water downstream, the design uses a drain from the reservoir bottom, feeding the worst-quality water downstream. This has had a negative effect on edible fish stocks in the Cuiabá River. By reducing flooding the dam affects the Mato Grosso Pantanal environment, which depends on seasonal floods, but does not fully protect Cuiabá from floods when the reservoir is full.

== Sources ==
- Guilherme Paranaiba (7 June 2016), "Represa do Rio Manso chega a volume alcançado pela última vez ha quase dois anos", em.com (in Portuguese)
- José Rodolpho Assenço (9 July 2013), "O Lago do Manso", fotostrada (in Portuguese)
- "LAGO DE MANSO - Estrutura turistica em expansão", Portal Turismo MT (in Portuguese)
- "Manso", Observatório Sócio-Ambiental da Baragens (in Portuguese)
- "Manso Hydroelectric Plant", FURNAS
- Renê Dióz (30 September 2014), Reservatório da principal hidrelétrica de MT está com 70% da capacidade (in Portuguese)
- "Usina hidrelétrica ameaça futuro", Diario de Cuiabá (in Portuguese)
