= Recapture of Corumbá =

- Part of the Mato Grosso campaign
Date	13 June 1867
Location	Corumbá, Mato Grosso, Brazil 19°00′32″S 57°39′10″W
Result	Brazilian victory

Belligerents
Paraguay	Empire of Brazil

Commanders and leaders
Hermógenes Cabral †	Antônio M. Coelho

Strength
313 soldiers	400 soldiers

Casualties and losses
152 killed or wounded 27 captured	30 killed or wounded

The Recapture of Corumbá, also known as the Second Battle of Corumbá, was a battle in the Paraguayan War, fought in the city of Corumbá in Mato Grosso do Sul, Empire of Brazil. The Imperial Brazilian Army under the command of Antônio Maria Coelho had launched an attack on the Paraguayan Army detachment occupying the city, under the command of Hermógenes Cabral. Corumbá was under the control of Paraguay since January 1865, in the first phase of the Paraguayan War.

== Background ==
On 30 December 1864, a Brazilian garrison of 154 men led by Hermenegildo Portocarrero retreated from a Paraguayan attack on the New Coimbra Fort. The garrison had exhausted their munitions defending the fort, and withdrew up the Paraguay River on board the gunship Anhambaí to the city of Corumbá. The Paraguayans continued their advancement, and eventually overtook the city in January 1865. The Paraguayans would control the city for two years until 1867. The Anhambaí had also been captured by the Paraguayans on a separate retreat by the Brazilians from Cuiabá in January 1866.

== Invasion ==
The preparations for the invasion in 1867 were made in Cuiabá. The president of Mato Grosso, José Vieira Couto de Magalhães, had decided to retake the city using three troop bodies. Under the command of Lieutenant Colonel Antônio Maria Coelho, the 1st Provisional Battalion of the Brazilian Army led by Lieutenant Colonel Antônio Coelho departed for Corumbá from Cuiabá on May 15, 1867, with 2,000 men on land and 1,200 men in the river squadron. The attack force had approached in the steamer boats Antonio João, Alfa, Jaurú and Corumbá, down the Cuiabá, Canabu and São Lourenço rivers to a settlement called Alegre. The troops then used canoes to approach Corumbá via the Paraguay river. At the time, the defending Paraguayan garrison of Corumbá had a force of 313 men, as well as the captured Brazilian Anhambaí gunship, and the Paraguayan Rio Apa warship.

Suspicious that the Paraguayans knew of their arrival, Coelho launched a surprise offensive of the town with 400 men on June 13, 1867, capturing the city within the day. During the fighting, Paraguayan Captain Hermógenes Cabral was killed in action. 500 Brazilians who had been taken prisoner since February 2nd were released once fighting ceased. A total of 152 Paraguayan soldiers were killed or wounded, a further 27 taken as prisoners, and the loss of six cannons and a flag. A total of 30 Brazilian soldiers had been killed or wounded in the fighting.

On June 23rd, 1867, Couto de Magalhães had entered the city with the 800 men of the 2nd Provisional Battalion of the Brazilian Army after the city had been captured by Brazilians. Couto de Magalhães had ordered the evacuation and abandonment of Corumbá shortly after, as an outbreak of smallpox had affected the city, and reports that a large Paraguayan force was approaching.
