= Anhambaí =

Gunboat operated by the navies of the Empire of Brazil and Paraguay

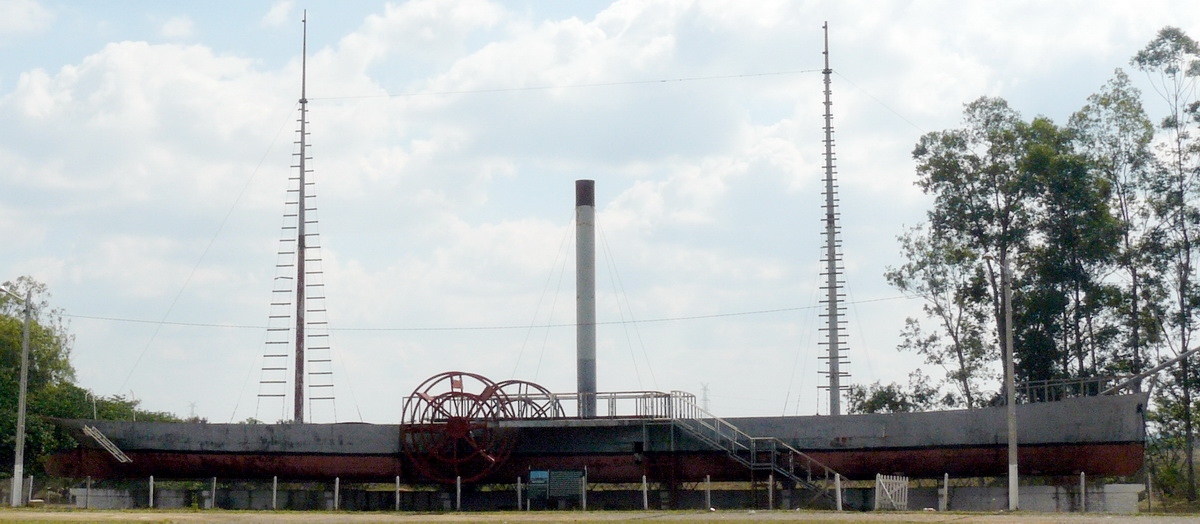
- Anhambaí

History

(Empire of Brazil) Brazil
- Name: Anhambaí
- Operator: Imperial Brazilian Navy
- Builder: Miers & Maslor Brothers
- Launched: 1858
- Commissioned: 25 June 1858
- Decommissioned: 6 January 1865
- Fate: Taken by Paraguayan naval forces on January 6, 1865 on the São Lourenço River

Paraguay
- Name: Anhambay
- Operator: Paraguayan Navy
- Commissioned: 6 January 1865
- Decommissioned: 18 August 1869
- Fate: Sunk by its crew on August 18, 1869 in the Yhaguy River

General characteristics
- Type: Gunboat
- Length: 130 ft (40 m)
- Beam: 26.6 ft (8.1 m)
- Draft: 3.94 ft (1.20 m)
- Installed power: 40 hp (29.4 kW)
- Propulsion: Sails 1 Steam boiler for side-propelled wheels
- Crew: 38 to 50
- Armament: 2 × 32-pounder cannons

Anhambaí is a museum ship and former gunboat operated by the navies of the Empire of Brazil and Paraguay. It is on display in the Vapor Cué National Park, located in the municipality of Caraguatay, Cordillera Department, Paraguay. The boat was built in England and incorporated into the Brazilian Imperial Navy on June 25, 1858. In the Paraguayan War, during the initial offensive of the Paraguayans on Brazil in December 1865, it acted in the defense of the New Coimbra Fort, offering artillery fire and support during the withdrawal of Brazilian forces.

The following month, while its crew were trying to flee to Cuiabá, it was captured by the Paraguayans, resulting in the death of a major part of the crew. In 1867, under Paraguayan control, it supported the Paraguayan forces in Corumbá against Brazilian attempts to retake the city. About two years later, after the imperial troops advanced on Caraguatay, where it was stationed, the crew set fire to it and sank it to avoid its capture. It remained submerged in the Yhaguy River until the 1970s, when it was recovered and restored, and has been on display at the Vapor Cué museum ever since.

== Characteristics ==
Anhambaí was built at the Mier & Maslor shipyard in England. It was named after the Serra Anhambai or Anhanvay, the source of the Miranda River, in present-day Mato Grosso do Sul. With an iron hull and propelled by a mixed system of sails and side wheels driven by a 40-hp steam engine with vertical cylinders, the gunboat also had a rectangular steam boiler with two burners. Its dimensions were 39.62 (130 feet) meters long, with a beam of between 6.11 meters and 8.10 meters, and a draft of 1.2 meters. It had two artillery pieces (howitzers) of 32-pound caliber.

Its crew consisted of 38 officers in peacetime and 50 in war. The ship was launched in 1858 and was incorporated into the navy on June 25 of the same year. A few days earlier, Senior Lieutenant João Mendes Salgado was appointed its first commander. A navy report at the time described the gunboat's characteristics as more akin to a packet boat than a warship.

== History ==
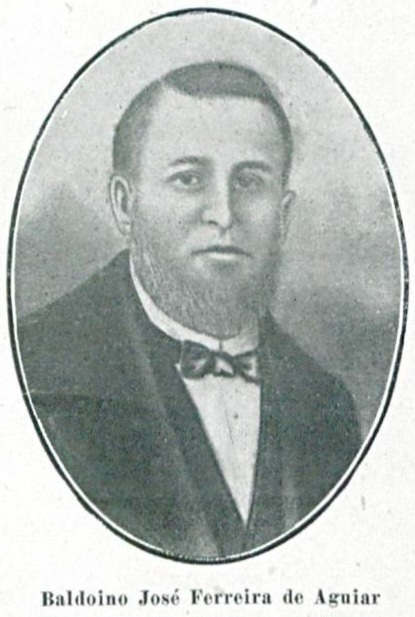
Balduíno José Ferreira de Aguiar, Anhambaí's commander

=== Service in the Brazilian navy ===
The Anhambaí was assigned to join the Mato Grosso Naval Force, now the Mato Grosso Flotilla, on September 2, 1858. The gunboat docked in Cuiabá, in the province of Mato Grosso, on October 12, 1859, carrying the future Marshal Manuel Deodoro da Fonseca, commander of the province's armed forces, and his family.

On December 27 and 28, 1864, on the occasion of the Mato Grosso campaign, it took part in the defense of Fort Coimbra, having transported the entire garrison of the fort. At the time, the ship was commanded by Captain Lieutenant Balduíno José Ferreira de Aguiar. During the attempt to take the fort, the Anhambaí positioned itself near the attacking vessels, firing its two 32-pound cannons at them and impeding attempts to disembark. At around 10:30 am, the Brazilian gunboat headed for a Paraguayan landing point on the right side of the river and opened fire on several columns of infantry and cavalry. The following day, still in support of the fort, the Anhambaí prevented several attempts to scale the parapet of the fortification “by the artillery and infantry fire of the Brazilians and by the bullets fired” from the gunboat.

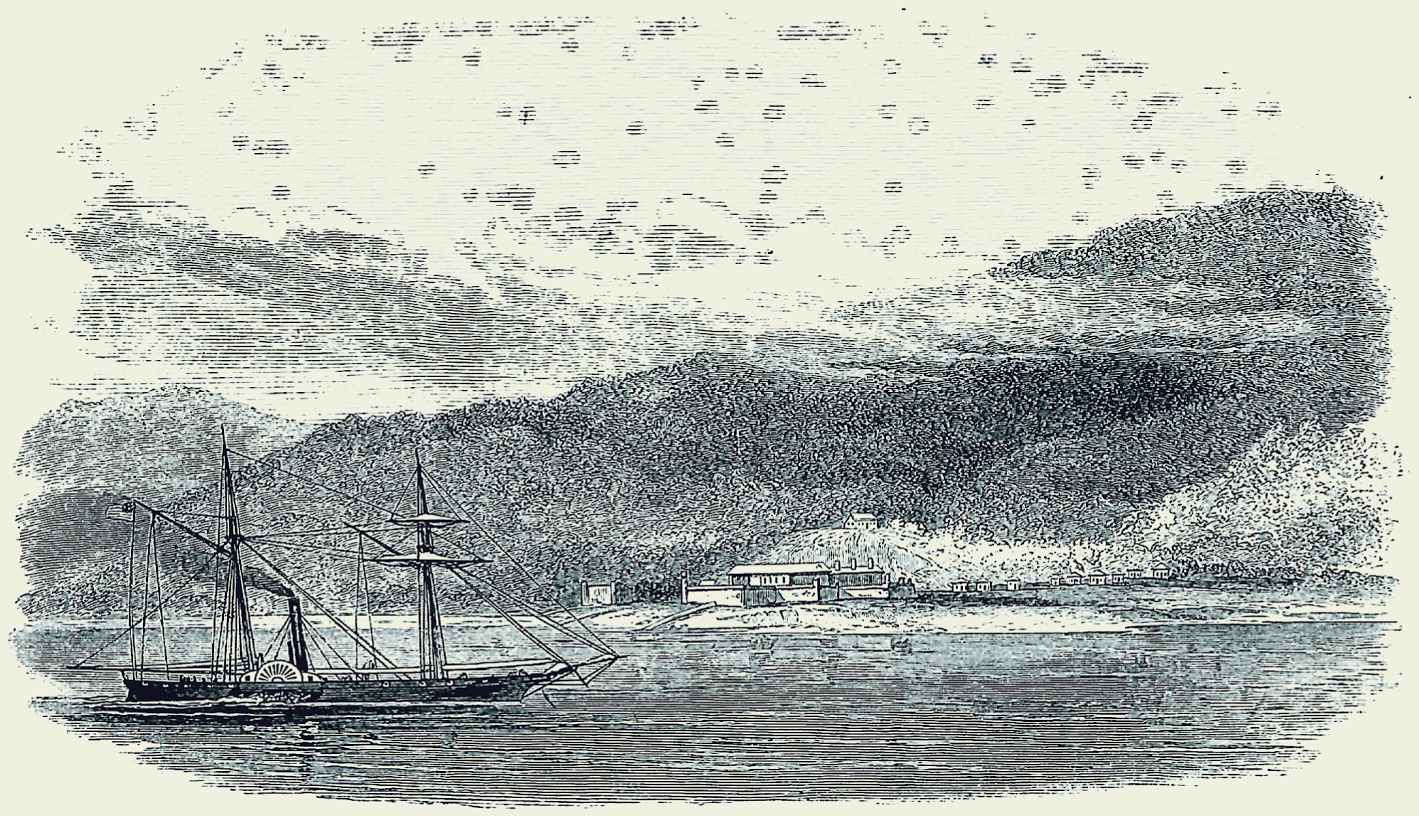
Coimbra Fort, drawing from 1859.

Still on the 28th, the defenders of the fort, in council, decided to abandon the position. Commander Balduíno, who was in the fort, left through the northern gate and boarded the Anhambaí. Subsequently, two of the ship's scalers were used to transport Colonel Portocarrero's defense troops to the gunboat. The escape took place after 9 pm without interception by the Paraguayan forces. There were eight ships and more than 5,000 Paraguayan soldiers surrounding Coimbra Fort, but the evacuation operation was completed without casualties among the Brazilian soldiers.

On January 2, 1865, the Anhambaí retreated to Corumbá, taking several officers and soldiers with it, as the Paraguayan attack on the city was imminent. The situation was critical, as the ship was full, sailing with the waterline up to the wheel boxes, and making its way up the Paraguay River with significant difficulty. On the 6th, two Paraguayan warships, Yporá and Rio Apa, reached the Anhambaí in the waters of the São Lourenço River. For the next 28 kilometers, the crew of the Brazilian ship attempted to evade the Paraguayan forces, firing at them with their rear artillery piece. However, in the thirteenth shot, the piece dismounted, (Note: Another source says that the piece came apart after the first shot.) leading to the boarding by the Paraguayan forces. The Paraguayan forces seized control of the Brazilian ship. They moved it to a ravine near Caracará Hill, a move made easier by the gunboat's difficulty in overcoming the force of the river in the face of the Yporá's harassment. All the men left the ship by land and some by river, where they reached the ravine. However, most of the crew were killed or taken prisoner, with only a small contingent managing to escape. From then on, the Anhambaí was operated by the Paraguayan navy.

=== Service in the Paraguayan navy ===
After its capture, the gunboat, renamed Anhambay, was sent to Paraguay where it underwent repairs on April 1 at Puerto de Marte, Asunción. The repairs were carried out by the Astillero y Talleres de Arsenal shipyard. After the work was completed, the gunboat spent the next few years transporting personnel and providing logistical support for Paraguayan troops during the conflict. On June 13, 1867, the gunboat was stationed in Corumbá along the Apa River and engaged in military operations in the city. On that date, a contingent of the Brazilian imperial army initiated a military operation to seize control of it. While the battle was taking place on land, Paraguayan vessels opened fire on the imperial positions. The battle ended in defeat, and both vessels returned to Asunción.

On December 28, 1868, the Anhambay was towed by the Vapor Pirabebé from Asunción to Caragataí, on the margins of the Yhaguy River, one of the channels of the Manduvirá River, where it remained until August 18, 1869. On that day, the Battle of Caguijuru and Caraguataí took place, where the troops of General José Antônio Correia da Câmara prevailed over the Paraguayan forces of Lieutenant Colonel Vernal. Seeing the imperials approaching, the crews of the remaining Paraguayan navy ships Yporá, Salto de Guairá, Rio Apa, Pirabebé, Anhambay, and Paraná decided to scuttle their ships to prevent their capture. The Brazilians noted the successive detonations as the ships were scuttled.

== Recovery ==
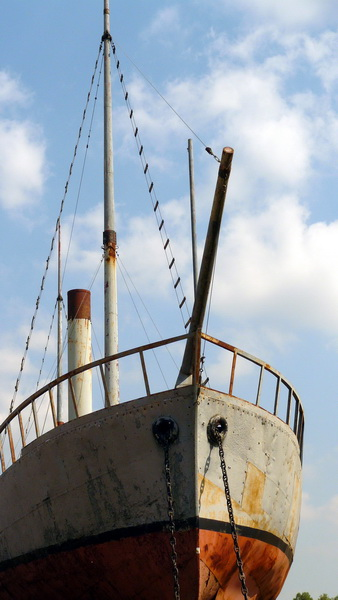
Vapor Pirabebé.

In 1978, a commission was organized to study the possibilities of recovering the ships submerged in the Yaghy River, including the Anhambay. This commission initiated the operation "Vapor Cué", which aimed to remove the ships and repurpose them as museums. The site was almost inaccessible, but the work progressed due to the low river levels and familiarity of the members with the area. The place where the ships were found is a narrow gorge surrounded by high stone walls. The Yhaguy River flows along the gorge, forming a small estuary. Access to the site is difficult, as there is no regular road. The commission that was sent to study the site found the destroyed remains of six ships along the gorge. The ships were in an advanced state of deterioration, covered with sand and dirt. The first ship, which was higher up the river, was the Vapor Apa. The second ship was the Vapor Pirabebé. The other four ships were not identified.

The vessels were completely buried in the sand, with only the boiler and parts of the hulls visible. The commission drew up a report detailing the steps to be taken to recover the historical relics. The report included the construction of an elevated platform over the estuary, the setting up of a camp, the provision of work elements and machinery to remove large amounts of dirt, the draining of the river, and other complementary works. The first attempt to recover the ships was to build dams to reroute the Yhaguy River. However, the torrential rains in the region caused the dams to be washed away, making it impossible to carry out this plan. The second attempt was to build an auxiliary channel to divert the river. This channel was built with mechanical shovels and bulldozers and was about a kilometer long. The canal was built in a place where the river was narrower, which made the work easier.

With the river rerouted, the ships could be removed in portions. To do this, cuts were made in the hulls so that they could be transported. The ships were towed out of the river with fishing boats. Once out of the river, the ships were placed on ceramic pedestals. They were then reassembled and welded to correct the damage caused by time and water. The recovery process on the Yhaguy took a significant amount of time and effort. It took five years of work to complete. The Anhambay was recovered and restored, serving today as a museum ship on display in the Vapor Cué National Park in Caraguatay, Cordillera Department.

== Devolution ==
Although the gunboat was recovered, the Brazilian government did not pursue its official recovery, despite returning various spoils from that conflict. Lawyer José Eduardo Ramos Rodrigues, in his article entitled “The case of the return of the ‘El Cristiano’ cannon to Paraguay” (2010), inquired about the absence of a proposal from the Paraguayan government for the return of the Anhambaí, as it did when it demanded the return of the cannon. According to Rodrigues, Brazil could negotiate an exchange of the assets. In 2010, at the 65th Meeting of IPHAN's Cultural Heritage Advisory Council, the question of the return of the Brazilian ship was raised. The civil society representative at the meeting, Maria Cecília Londres Fonseca, argued that asking the Paraguayan government to return the vessel was legitimate and that such goods were instruments that would contribute to dialogue and peace between the nations. However, in 2022, the gunboat was still on display in the museum.

== See also ==
- Capture of the gunboat Anhambaí
- List of historical ships of the Brazilian Navy
- Manduvirá River Expeditions
