= Rio da Casca Ecological Station =

Ecological station in Mato Grosso, Brazil

- Estação Ecológica do Rio da Casca
- IUCN category Ia (strict nature reserve)
- Location within Brazil
- Nearest city: Chapada dos Guimarães, Mato Grosso
- Coordinates: 15°33′42″S 55°26′35″W
- Area: 3,534 hectares (8,730 acres)
- Designation: Ecological station
- Created: 27 May 1994
- Administrator: Coordenadoria de Unidades de Conservação, MT

The Rio da Casca Ecological Station (Portuguese: Estação Ecológica do Rio da Casca) is an ecological station in the state of Mato Grosso, Brazil. It protects a partly deforested area of savanna.

== Location ==
The Rio da Casca Ecological Station (ESEC) is divided between the municipalities of Chapada dos Guimarães (76.61%), Cuiabá (10.84%) and Campo Verde (12.52%) in the state of Mato Grosso. The ESEC has two parts, one with an area of 3,329 hectares (8,230 acres) and the other with an area of 205 hectares (510 acres). The total area is 3,534 hectares (8,730 acres). It lies to the east of the MT-450 state highway and is south of the BR-251 federal highway.

== History ==
The Rio da Casca Ecological Station was created by state governor decree 6.437 of 27 May 1994. The consultative council was created on 15 December 2014.

== Environment ==
The ESEC is just over 87% savannah, and about 13% contact between savannah and seasonal forest. It overlaps about 7% with the Chapada dos Guimarães Environmental Protection Area. The ESEC was about 65% deforested at time of creation, and since then has lost a further 4% of forest coverage. The Casca River, a tributary of the Roncador River, runs through the ESEC from south to north.

== Sources ==
- ESEC do Rio da Casca (in Portuguese), ISA: Instituto Socioambiental
- Roberta dos Santos; Laurent Micol; Gustavo Irgang; Jane Vasconcellos (September 2006), O desmatamento nas Unidades de Conservação em Mato Grosso (PDF), Alta Floresta e Cuiabá: Instituto Centro de Vida - ICV, archived from the original (PDF) on 2016-09-24
- Serys Slhessarenko (27 May 1994), Lei nº 6.437, de 27 de Maio de 1994 - D.O. 27.05.94. (in Portuguese), Mato Grosso Government
