= Quineira State Park =

State park in Mato Grosso, Brazil

- Parque Estadual da Quineira
- IUCN category II (national park)
- Location within Brazil
- Nearest city: Chapada dos Guimarães, Mato Grosso
- Coordinates: 15.463469°S 55.745724°W
- Area: 31 hectares (77 acres)
- Designation: State park
- Created: 26 December 2006

The Quineira State Park (Portuguese: Parque Estadual da Quineira) is a state park in the state of Mato Grosso, Brazil. It protects a small area of forest in the town of Chapada dos Guimarães, and the forest in turn protects the town's main water supply.

== Location ==
The Quineira State Park is in the municipality of Chapada dos Guimarães, Mato Grosso. It has an area of 31 hectares (77 acres). The park is in the Paraná Sedimentary Basin in the Guimarães Plateau region. The park contains the main water catchment of the town of Chapada dos Guimarães. The Córrego do Quineira (Quineira Stream) rises in the south of the park. It has a length of 2,688 metres (8,819 ft), and drains part of the urban area. Its microbasin is in the Cachoeirinha River sub-basin of the Cuiabá River basin.

A study of water quality in 2013 found the presence of coliform bacteria throughout the stream, with higher levels downstream from the park. Escherichia coli was present in relatively low levels near the stream's sources within the park, probably coming from wild animals. Lower down the Escherichia coli levels rose significantly, indicating sewage discharge. The study concluded that the park was relatively uncontaminated, but access to the park should be limited to students and researchers.

== History ==
The area was a permanent preservation area that was converted to a municipal park in 2002 and to a state park in 2006. The Quineira State Park was created by law 8.615 of 26 December 2006. The objective was to guarantee protection of natural resources, preserve significant samples of existing ecosystems in the area, and support public use, education and scientific research without harm to the environment. The state could make ecological trails, and could build a dam after due study of the environmental impact.

In May 2014 it was reported that the municipality had approved construction of a luxury hostel within 10 metres (33 ft) of the park, contravening the Brazilian Forestry Code, which says there must be a protected zone of 50 metres (160 ft) around springs and water sources. The project did not have an environmental permit from SEMA, the state environment agency. The owner claimed that he was working within the law, replacing an old building and doing nothing to harm the environment since the hostel was to have a green seal.

On 11 November 2015 demonstrators in Chapada dos Guimarães demanded action to restore the park. The municipality was responsible for supervising the park, but had failed to do so. Irregular housing had been built within the park, garbage dumped in it, and sewage had flowed into the park from houses and shops around it.

== Sources ==
- "Comunidade se une em defesa do Parque da Quineira", Folha da Chapada (in Portuguese), 12 November 2015, archived from the original on 2016-12-20
- Gomes-Silva, P. A. J.; Lima, S. D.; Golin, R.; Figueiredo, D. M.; Lima, Z. M.; Morais, E. B.; Dores, E. F. G. C. (August 2014), "Qualidade da água de uma microbacia com fins de abastecimento público, Chapada dos Guimarães, MT", HOLOS (in Portuguese), 30 (4): 22, doi:10.15628/holos.2014.1977
- Matos, Marcia (10 May 2014), "Pousada de Luxo é acusada prejudicar captação de água em Chapada; obra não teria licença ambiental", Reporter MT (in Portuguese), archived from the original on 2016-12-20
- PES Quineira (in Portuguese), ISA: Instituto Socioambiental
