= Roncador River (Mato Grosso) =

- Location within Brazil
- Native name: Rio Roncador (Portuguese)

Location
- Country: Brazil

Physical characteristics
- Mouth
  - location: Chapada dos Guimarães, MT
  - coordinates: 15.036127°S 55.513384°W

Basin features
- River system: Manso River
- Tributaries
  - left: Casca River

The Roncador River (Portuguese: Rio Roncador) is a river of the state of Mato Grosso, Brazil. It is a tributary of the Manso River.

== Course ==
The Casca River joins the Roncador River in an arm of the Manso Dam.

== See also ==
- List of rivers of Mato Grosso

== Sources ==
- ESEC do Rio da Casca (in Portuguese), ISA: Instituto Socioambiental
