= Piquiri River =

Piquiri River or Piquirí River may refer to

- Piquiri River (Paraná), a tributary of the Paraná River in Brazil
- Piquirí River (São Lourenço), a tributary of the São Lourenço River in Brazil
