= Casca River =

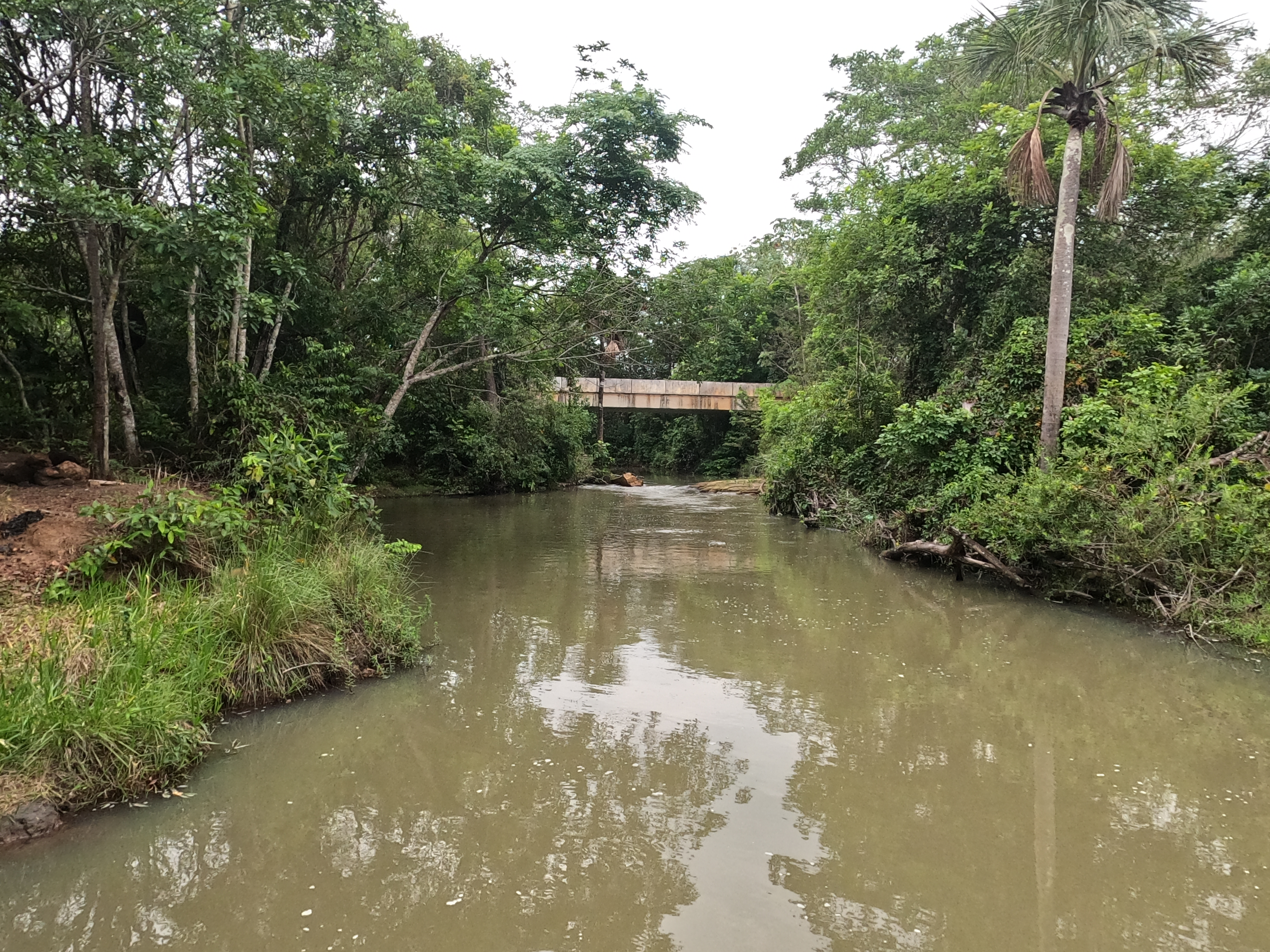

- Location within Brazil
- Native name: Rio Casca (Portuguese)

Location
- Country: Brazil

Physical characteristics
- Mouth
  - location: Chapada dos Guimarães, MT
  - coordinates: 15.084140°S 55.494006°W

Basin features
- River system: Roncador River

The Casca River (Portuguese: Rio Casca) is a river of the state of Mato Grosso, Brazil. It is a tributary of the Roncador River.

== Course ==
The Casca River runs through the Rio da Casca Ecological Station from south to north. Further north the Casca river is dammed for the Casca Hydroelectric Plant. Still further north it joins the Roncador River in an arm of the Manso Dam.

== See also ==
- List of rivers of Mato Grosso

== Sources ==
- ESEC do Rio da Casca (in Portuguese), ISA: Instituto Socioambiental
