= Alegre River (Mato Grosso) =

- Location within Brazil
- Native name: Rio Alegre (Portuguese)

Location
- Country: Brazil

Physical characteristics
- Mouth
  - location: Caçanje River
  - coordinates: 16.700216°S 56.506906°W

Basin features
- Progression: Mato Grosso state
- River system: Cuiabá River

The Alegre River is a river of Mato Grosso state in western Brazil.

It is a tributary of the Caçanje River, which in turn is a tributary of the Cuiabá River.

== Course ==
The Alegre River flows northeast across the Encontro das Águas State Park parallel to the Caçanje River, forms part of the eastern border of the park, then continues east to join the Caçanje just before that river enters the Cuiabá. The region, rich in watercourses, supports diverse pantanal vegetation.

== See also ==
- List of rivers of Mato Grosso

== Sources ==
- Mapa Geológico do Estado de Mato Grosso (PDF), CPRM
- PES Encontro das Águas (in Portuguese), ISA: Instituto Socioambiental
