= Capture of the gunboat Anhambaí =

Capture of the Anhambaí
- Part of the Mato Grosso campaign
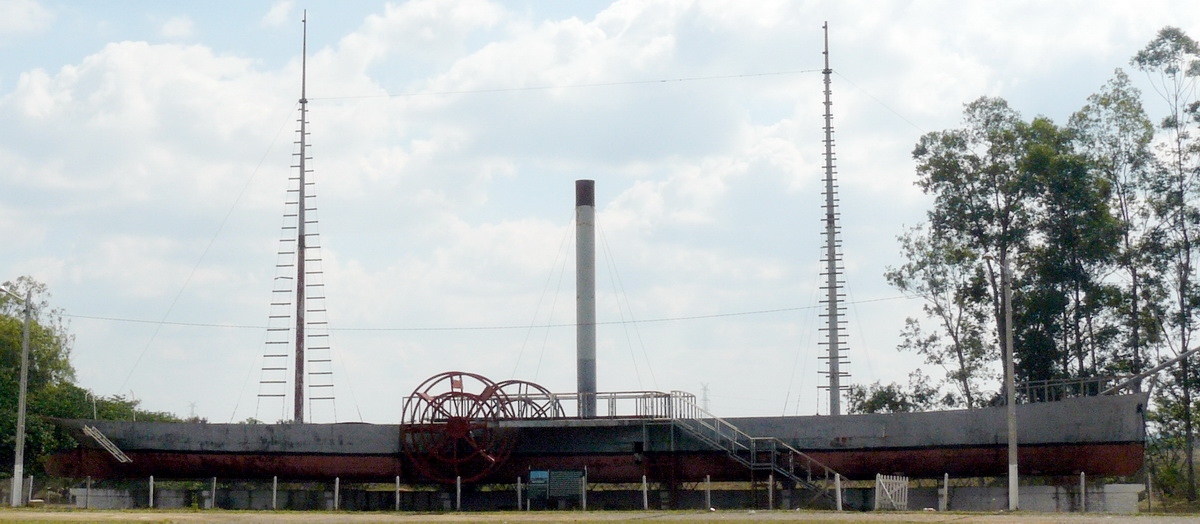
- Gunboat Anhambaí
Date	January 6, 1865
Location	São Lourenço River, Mato Grosso, Brazil
Result	Paraguayan victory: Capture of the gunboat Anhambaí

Belligerents
Paraguay	Empire of Brazil

Commanders and leaders
Unknown	José Guimarães (POW)

Strength
2 Corvettes	1 Gunboat; 34 soldiers

Casualties and losses
Unknown	1 Gunboat captured All crewmen captured

The Capture of the Amambaí steam occurred on January 6, 1865, when the Paraguayan corvettes Yporá and Río Apa attacked the Amambaí gunboat on São Lourenço River, after the people who had been evacuated from the Fort of Coimbra and Corumbá landed in Sará. Yporá rammed the gunboat Amambaí, throwing it against the bank, near Morro do Caracará.
