= Manso River (Mato Grosso) =

- Location within Brazil
- Native name: Rio Manso (Portuguese)

Location
- Country: Brazil

Physical characteristics
- Source
  - location: Mato Grosso
- Mouth
  - coordinates: 14.697163°S 56.241403°W
- Length: 850 kilometres (530 mi)

Basin features
- River system: Cuiabá River

The Manso River (Portuguese: Rio Manso) is a river in the Mato Grosso state of western Brazil. It is a tributary of the Cuiabá River, and is approximately 850 kilometers long.

The river is impounded by the Manso Dam in Rosário Oeste, Mato Grosso, creating a 427 square kilometres (165 sq mi) reservoir to power a 92 MW hydroelectric power plant.

== See also ==
- List of rivers of Mato Grosso
