= Vermelho River (São Lourenço River tributary) =

Vermelho River Poguba River
- Mouth location in Brazil
- Native name: Rio Vermelho (Portuguese)

Location
- Country: Brazil

Physical characteristics
- Source
  - location: Mato Grosso
- Mouth
  - coordinates: 16°48′31″S 56°06′22″W

Basin features
- River system: São Lourenço River

The Vermelho River (Portuguese: Rio Vermelho), also known as the Poguba River, is a river in the state of Mato Grosso, Brazil. In its lower reaches it is called the São Lourenço River.

The Vermelho River runs through the south of the city of Rondonópolis, Mato Grosso, and past the Dom Osório Stoffel State Park on its south (left) bank. It continues in a generally southwest direction to become the São Lourenço around the municipality of Barão de Melgaço.

== See also ==
- List of rivers of Mato Grosso
