= Dom Osório Stoffel State Park =

State park in Mato Grosso, Brazil

- Parque Estadual Dom Osório Stoffel
- IUCN category II (national park)
- Location within Brazil
- Nearest city: Rondonópolis, Mato Grosso
- Coordinates: 16.602925°S 54.758989°W
- Area: 6,422 hectares (15,870 acres)
- Designation: State park
- Created: 12 November 2002
- Administrator: Coordenadoria de Unidades de Conservação

The Dom Osório Stoffel State Park (Portuguese: Parque Estadual Dom Osório Stoffel) is a state park in the state of Mato Grosso, Brazil. It protects an area of the cerrado biome.

== Location ==
The Dom Osório Stoffel State Park is in the municipality of Rondonópolis, Mato Grosso. It has an area of 6,422 hectares (15,870 acres). It extends south from the Vermelho River to the west of the Rondonópolis Airport. The Ribeirăo Ponte da Pedra runs through the park from the south to join the Vermelho.

== Environment ==
The park is in the cerrado biome. It has more than 280 species of trees and 500 species of fauna, including several threatened with extinction. The park is rich in watercourses, waterfalls and wildlife, and is a breeding area for fish. The goal is to protect water resources, allow movement of native fauna species and preserve a representative sample of the ecosystems, while allowing controlled use by the public for education and scientific research.

== History ==
The Dom Osório Stoffel State Park was created by decree 5.437 of 12 November 2002. The consultative council was created on 6 October 2010. The management plan was published on 12 November 2012, providing guidance on how the park can be used in a sustainable way for purposes such as ecotourism and environmental education. On 17 October 2014 the proprietors of land in the park were asked to present documentation on their claims.

== Sources ==
- Paredes, Denilson (12 November 2012), "Empresa apresenta Plano de Manejo ambiental do Parque Dom Osório", Gazeta MT (in Portuguese)
- "Parque Estadual dom Osório Stoffel", Via Rural (in Portuguese), archived from the original on December 23, 2016
- PE Dom Osório Stoffel (in Portuguese), WWF Brasil
- PES Dom Osório Stoffel (in Portuguese), ISA: Instituto Socioambiental
