= Caçanje River =

- Location within Brazil
- Native name: Rio Caçanje (Portuguese)

Location
- Country: Brazil

Physical characteristics
- Source
  - location: Mato Grosso state
- Mouth
  - location: Cuiabá River
  - coordinates: 16.698653°S 56.487769°W

Basin features
- River system: Cuiabá River
- Tributaries
  - right: Alegre River

The Caçanje River (Portuguese: Rio Caçanje), also called the Cassange River, is a river of Mato Grosso state in western Brazil. It is a tributary of the Cuiabá River.

== Course ==
The Caçanje River defines part of the northern border of the Encontro das Águas State Park, then flows northeast to join the Cuiabá River. Further south the Alegre River flows northeast across the park parallel to the Caçanje, forms part of the eastern border, then continues east to join the Caçanje just before that river enters the Cuiabá. The region, rich in watercourses, supports diverse pantanal vegetation.

== See also ==
- List of rivers of Mato Grosso

== Sources ==
- Mapa Geológico do Estado de Mato Grosso (PDF), CPRM
- PES Encontro das Águas (in Portuguese), ISA: Instituto Socioambiental
