= Transpantaneira =

Highway in Mato Grosso, Brazil

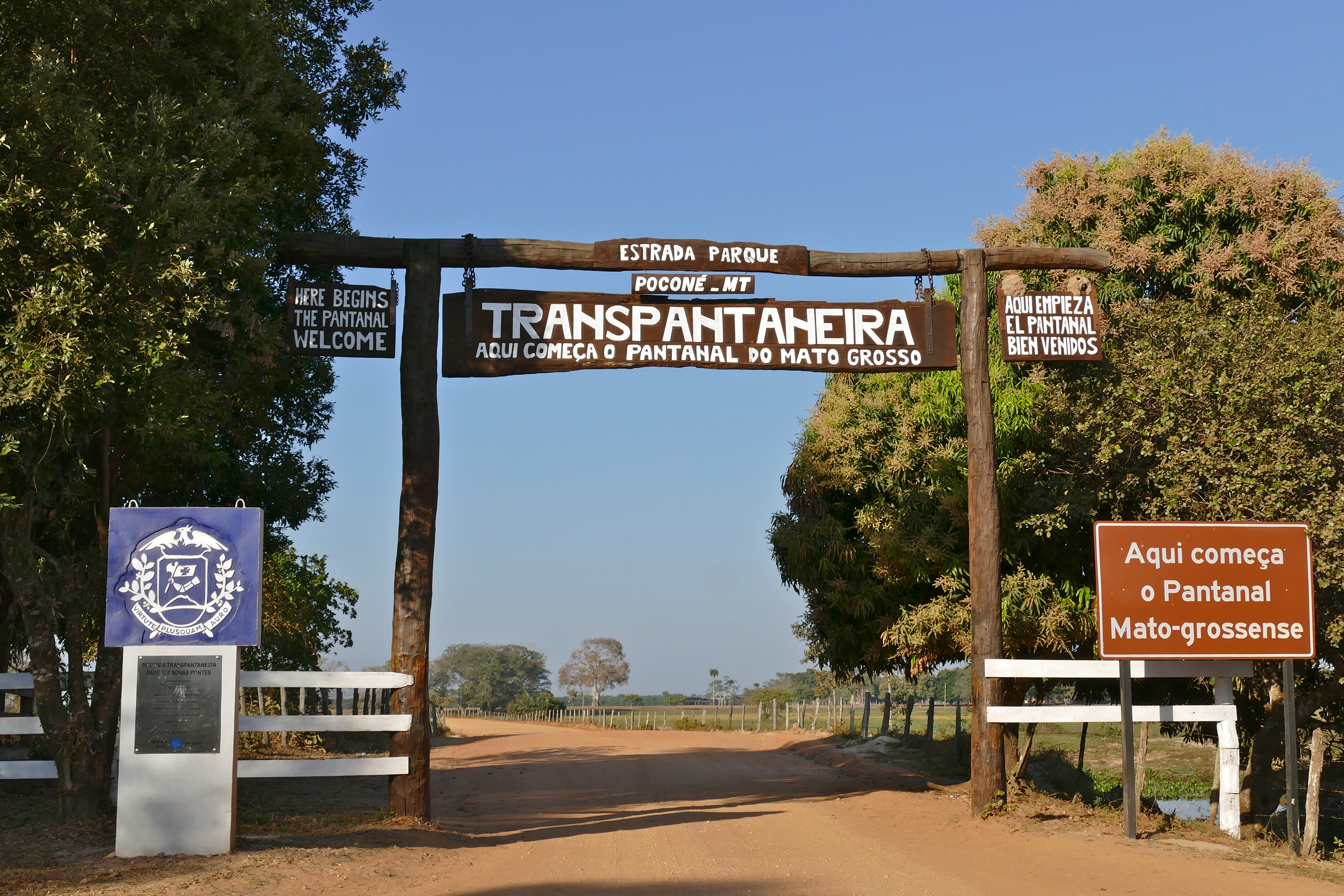
Transpantaneira, Poconé, Mato Grosso, Brazil

The Transpantaneira, also known as MT-060, is a road that crosses part of the Pantanal, in the state of Mato Grosso in Brazil. The road links the city of Poconé and the small settlement of Porto Jofre. It is 147 kilometres (91 mi) long and crosses no less than 122 wooden bridges. The road provides opportunity for wild life watching, especially in dry season.

It was originally meant to extend from Poconé to Corumbá, facilitating transport from Cuiabá to the latter. However, after difficulties due to the wet Pantanal landscape and ecological concerns, construction was stopped at Porto Jofre, on the Mato Grosso side of the border with Mato Grosso do Sul, and plans to complete it have not come to fruition.
