= Campo Verde =

Coordinates: 15.5667°S 55.1689°W

- Municipality
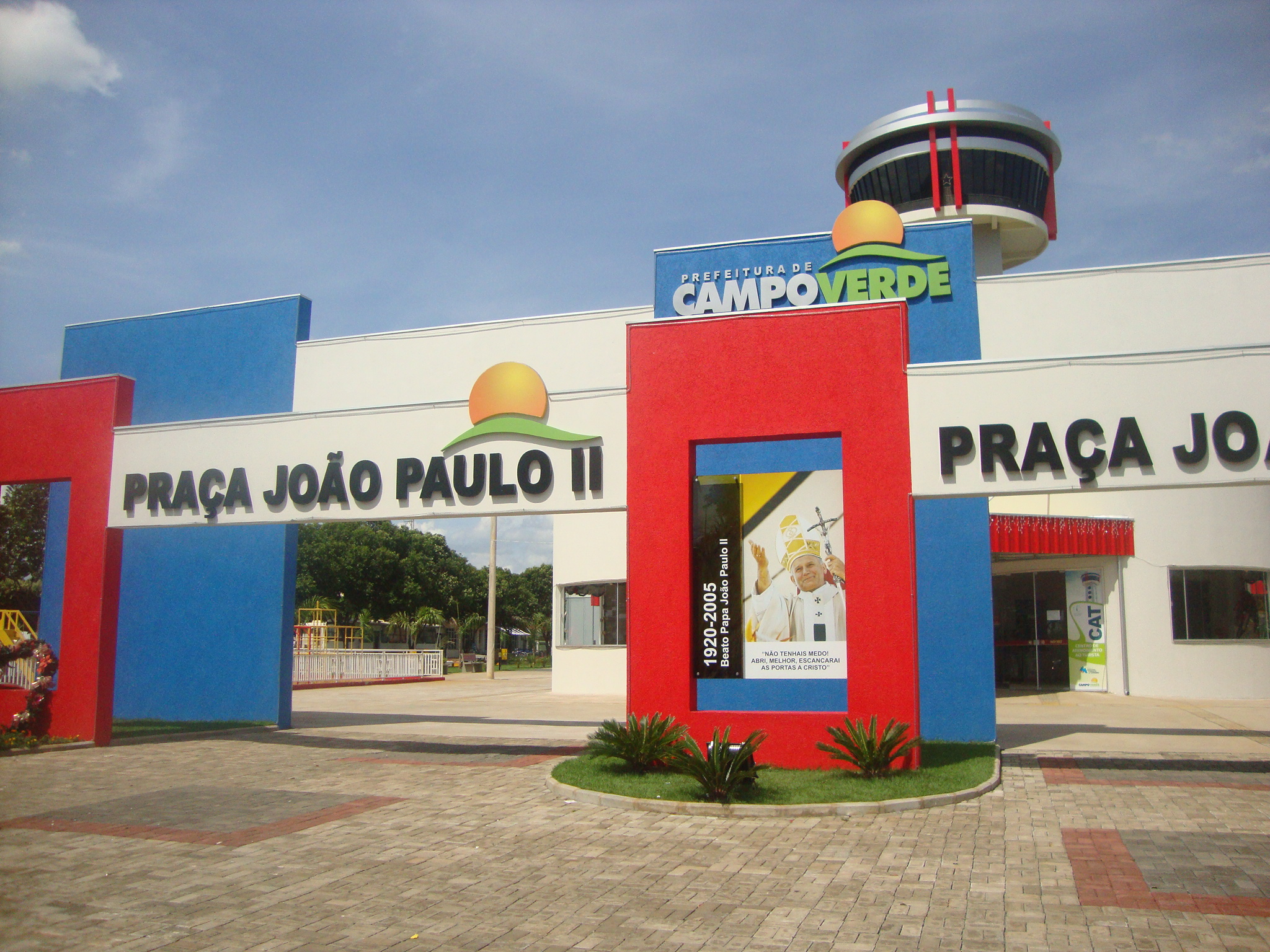

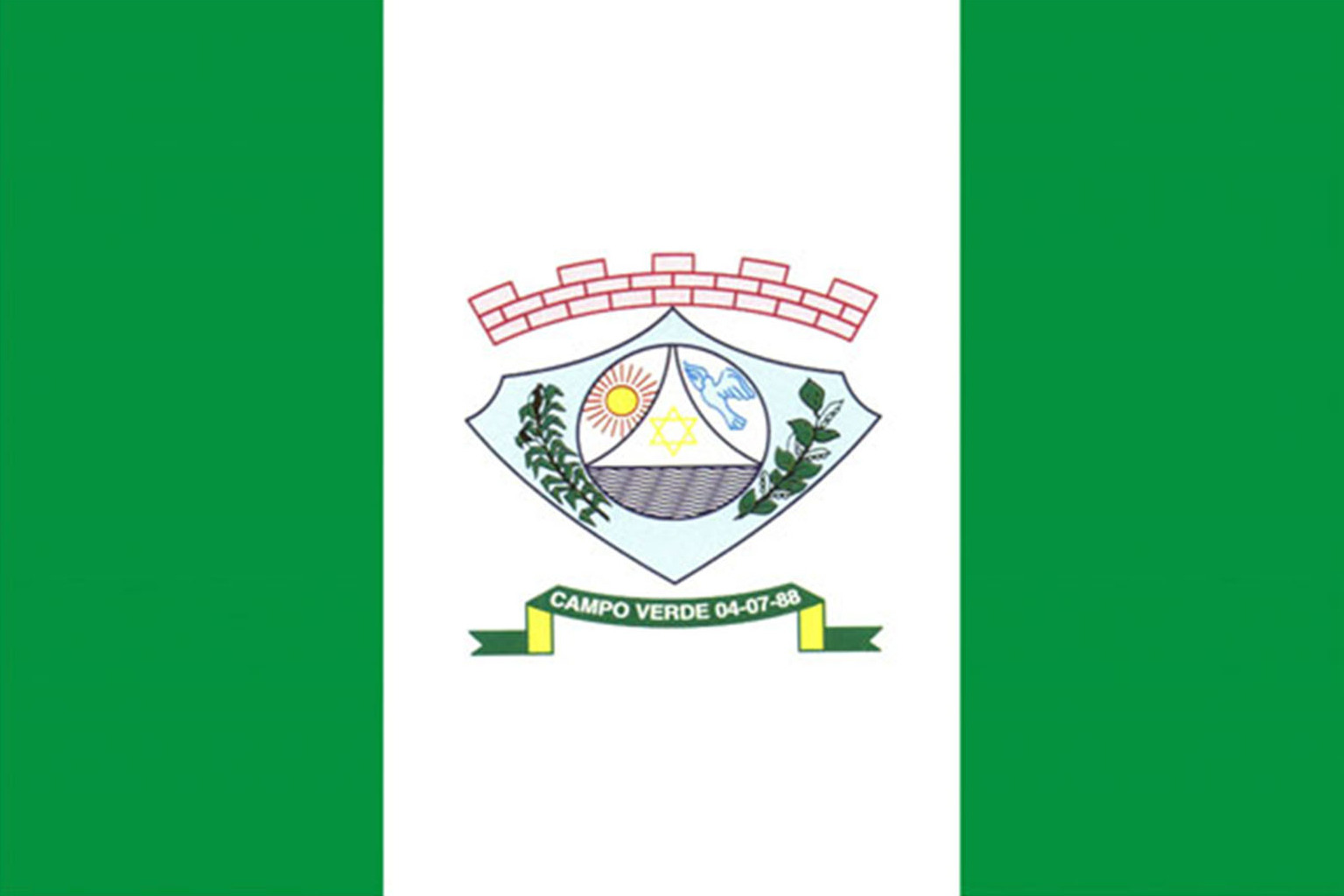
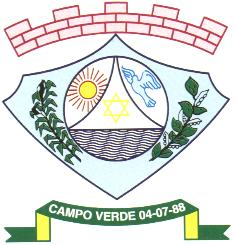
- Flag Coat of arms

- Country: Brazil
- Region: Center-West
- State: Mato Grosso
- Mesoregion: Sudeste Mato-Grossense

Population (2020)
  - Total: 45,740
- Time zone: UTC−3 (BRT)

Campo Verde is a municipality in the state of Mato Grosso in the Central-West Region of Brazil.

The municipality contains 13% of the 3,534 hectares (8,730 acres) Rio da Casca Ecological Station, a strictly protected conservation unit created in 1994.

== History ==
The region began to be populated in 1886 by the Borges and Fernandes families. The town held no relevant economic activities until the 1960s. With the installation of a gas station, agriculture became a viable option. The fertile soil allowed for plantations to prosper, population to grow and consequently giving the land the need for leadership organization. The municipality was given the name "Campo Verde", separating from the "Dom Aquino" municipality. The name "Campo Verde" was chosen by the inhabitants of the municipality through a referendum, and it is in honor of the extensive soy plantations that dominate the landscape during harvest.

== See also ==
- List of municipalities in Mato Grosso
