= Porto Jofre =

Settlement in southern Brazil

Coordinates: 17°20′S 56°48′W

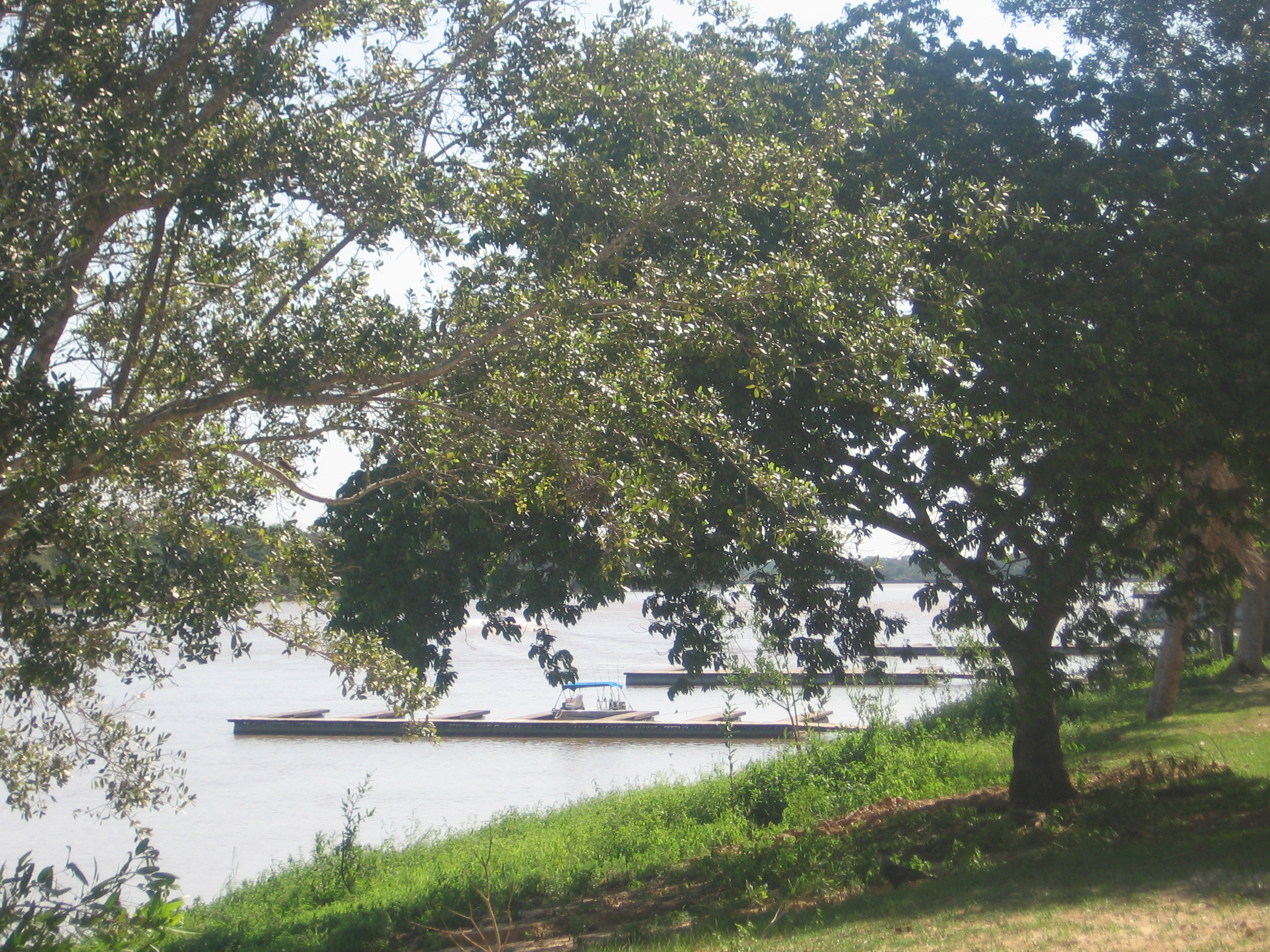
View of the Cuiabá River from Porto Jofre.

Porto Jofre is a settlement in southern Brazil, located on the Cuiabá River in western Mato Grosso state. It is at the end of the Transpantaneira Road. The Pantanal Matogrossense National Park is in the area downstream.

== Habitat ==
Porto Jofre is within the diverse Pantanal ecosystem and region, and is adjacent to wetlands with marshland habitats rich in waterfowl, migratory birds, and other wildlife. They are protected Ramsar Convention and World Heritage Sites.
