= Rondonópolis =

- Municipality
- Município de Rondonópolis
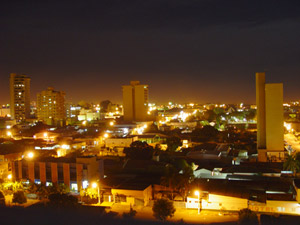

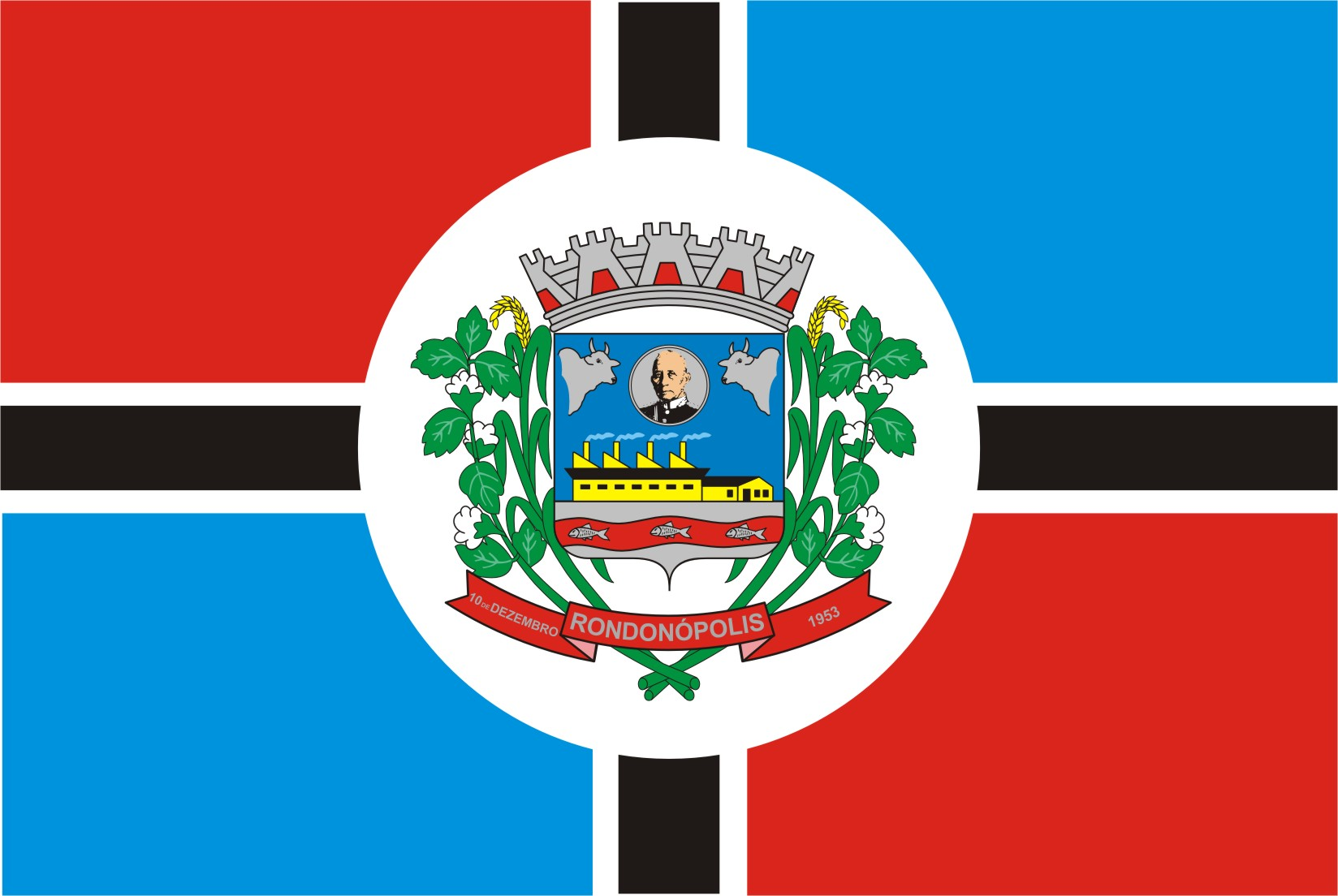
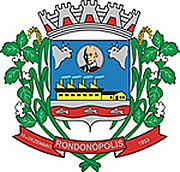
- Flag Seal
- Nickname: Little Princess of the South (Princesinha do Sul in Portuguese)
- Location of Rondonópolis

- Location within Brazil
- Coordinates: 16°28′15″S 54°38′09″W
- Country: Brazil
- Region: Central-West
- State: Mato Grosso
- Founded: December 10, 1953

Government
  - Mayor: Cláudio Ferreira

Area
  - Total: 10,787.90 km^{2} (4,165.232 sq mi)
- Elevation: 227 m (745 ft)

Population (2022 Brazilian census)
  - Total: 244,911
  - Estimate (2025): 263,708
  - Density: 22.7024/km^{2} (58.7989/sq mi)
- Time zone: UTC−4 (AMT)

Rondonópolis (formerly known as Rio Vermelho (Red River)) is the third-largest municipality in Mato Grosso, Brazil. It is located around 215 km (134 mi) from Cuiabá, the capital of the state. The city is named for military officer and explorer Cândido Rondon.

== Geography ==
=== Climate ===
According to the Köppen climate classification, Rondonópolis is classified as tropical savanna climate (Köppen: Aw), on summer is hot, the temperature rises to 35°C, on winter are warm, the temperature rises to 30°C.

=== Location ===
The municipality contains the 6,422-hectare (15,870-acre) Dom Osório Stoffel State Park, created in 2002. The Vermelho River runs through the south of the municipal seat and along the north of the state park border.

=== Distances ===
- Cuiabá 215 km - (134 miles)
- Campo Grande 485 km - (301 miles)
- Brasília 922 km - (573 miles)
- São Paulo 1.493 km - (928 miles)
- Rio de Janeiro 1.806 km - (1,122 miles)

== Overview ==
According to the Brazilian census in 2022 the town had 244,911 inhabitants.

The city is growing quickly because many industries settled there and the soybean plantation is considered a "new gold rush" in the region, attracting emigrants from distant regions of Brazil. These people are from the South and Southeast regions who used to work with cattle ranching. The farming is extensive and very automated compared to other parts of Brazil. The farms are interesting as when the industry was labor-intensive the owners built small villages around the main house for the workers. These "villages" were self-contained and included schools and medical facilities. Rarely used now for their original purpose many still stand. They are seen as an island surrounded by trees in the middle of soy bean plants stretching to the horizon.

In August 2007 the Italian wind orchestra Orchestra Fiati Giovanile Italiana e Coro "I Music Piemonteis" conducted by Ugo Bairo, and his choir, conducted by Carmelo Luca Sambataro performed there. There he premiered his wind composition dedicated to the local government: The Mato Grosso March. The city is situated on the Cerrado, high tableland intersected by deep gorges containing butte and mesa formations.

The city is also the jumping off point for tourists and sportsmen visiting the Northern Pantanal. Rondonópolis has a domestic airport, Maestro Marinho Franco Municipal Airport.

== See also ==
- List of municipalities in Mato Grosso
