= Encontro das Águas State Park =

State park in Mato Grosso, Brazil

- Parque Estadual Encontro das Águas
- IUCN category II (national park)
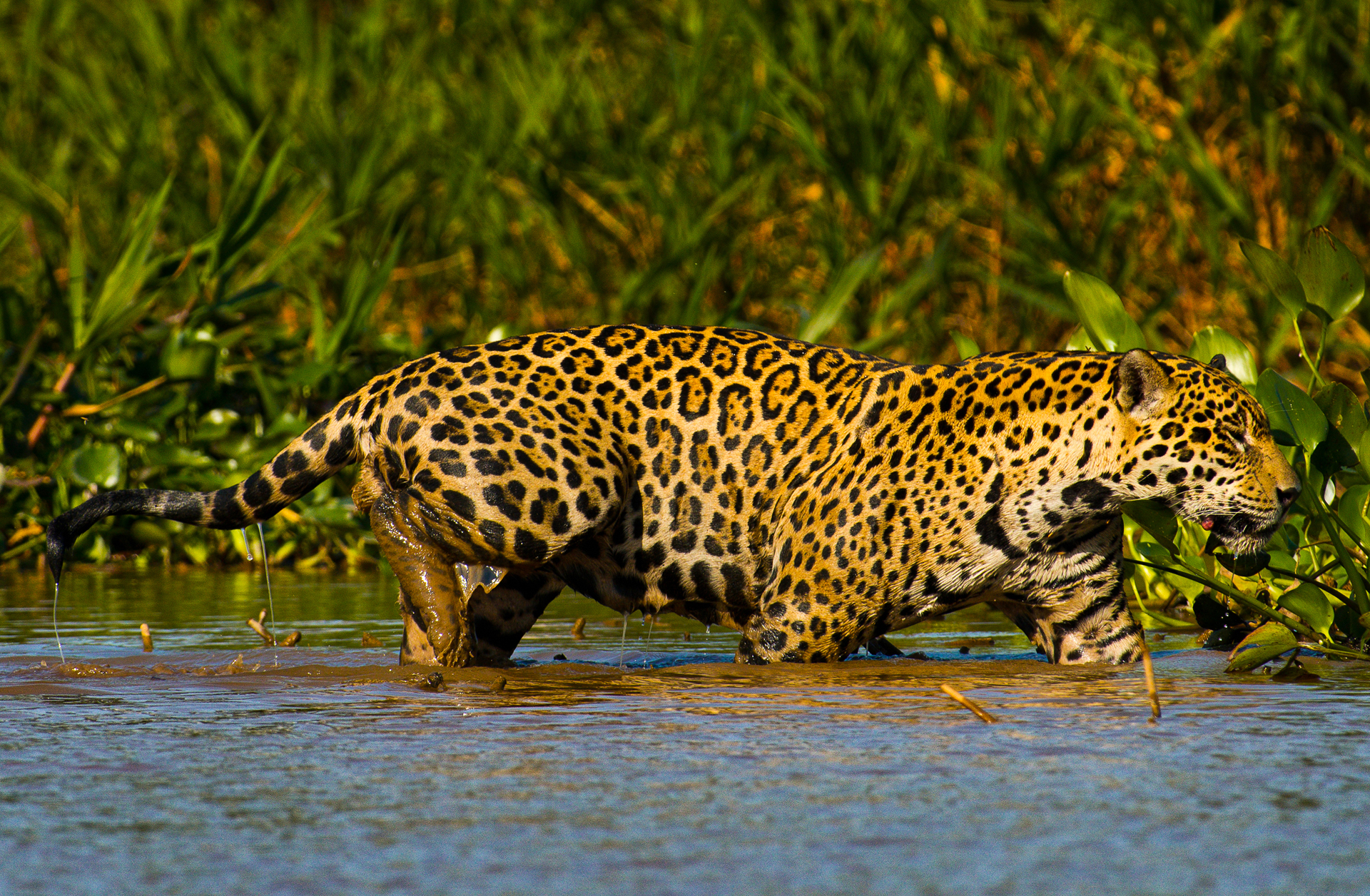
- Male jaguar in the park

- Location within Brazil
- Nearest city: Poconé, Mato Grosso
- Coordinates: 17.12°S 56.69°W
- Area: 108,960 ha (269,200 acres)
- Designation: State park
- Created: 22 December 2004

The Encontro das Águas State Park (Portuguese: Parque Estadual Encontro das Águas) is a state park in the state of Mato Grosso, Brazil. It covers an area of the pantanal rich in watercourses.

== Location ==
The Encontro das Águas State Park is divided between the municipalities of Poconé (56.71%) and Barão de Melgaço (43.29%) in the state of Mato Grosso. It has an area of 108,960 ha (269,200 acres). The MT-060 highway cuts across the northwest tip of the park, and a road leads from MT-060 along the northeast border of the park. The park covers an area rich in watercourses that support rich biodiversity of pantanal flora and fauna.

== Rivers ==
The Caçanje River defines part of the northern border of the park, flowing northeast to join the Cuiabá River. Further south the Alegre River flows northeast across the park parallel to the Caçanje, forms part of the eastern border, then continues east to join the Caçanje just before that river enters the Cuiabá. The Cuiabá flows southwest and forms part of the eastern border of the park. On some maps it is now called the Canabu River.

The Cuiabá / Canabu cuts across the park, where it joins the São Lourenço River, or Pingara River, which also cuts across the park from the east. The São Lourenço continues southwest across the park, then defines the west border of the southern part of the park. The park is bounded to the south by the Piquirí River, which defines the border with the state of Mato Grosso do Sul. The Piquiri flows west to join the São Lourenço at the southwest boundary of the park.

== History ==
The Encontro das Águas State Park was created by decree 4.881 of 22 December 2004 by the governor of Mato Grosso. On 17 October 2014 SEMA gave a last call to landowners or leaseholders to provide documentation supporting their claims. The consultative council was created on 18 December 2014. Fishing is banned within 2 km (1.2 mi) of the state park, although this only applies within Mato Grosso and not across the Piquiri River in Mato Grosso do Sul. This has caused some hardship to about 40 riverine families in Mato Grosso who depend on fishing for a living.

== Eco-tourism ==
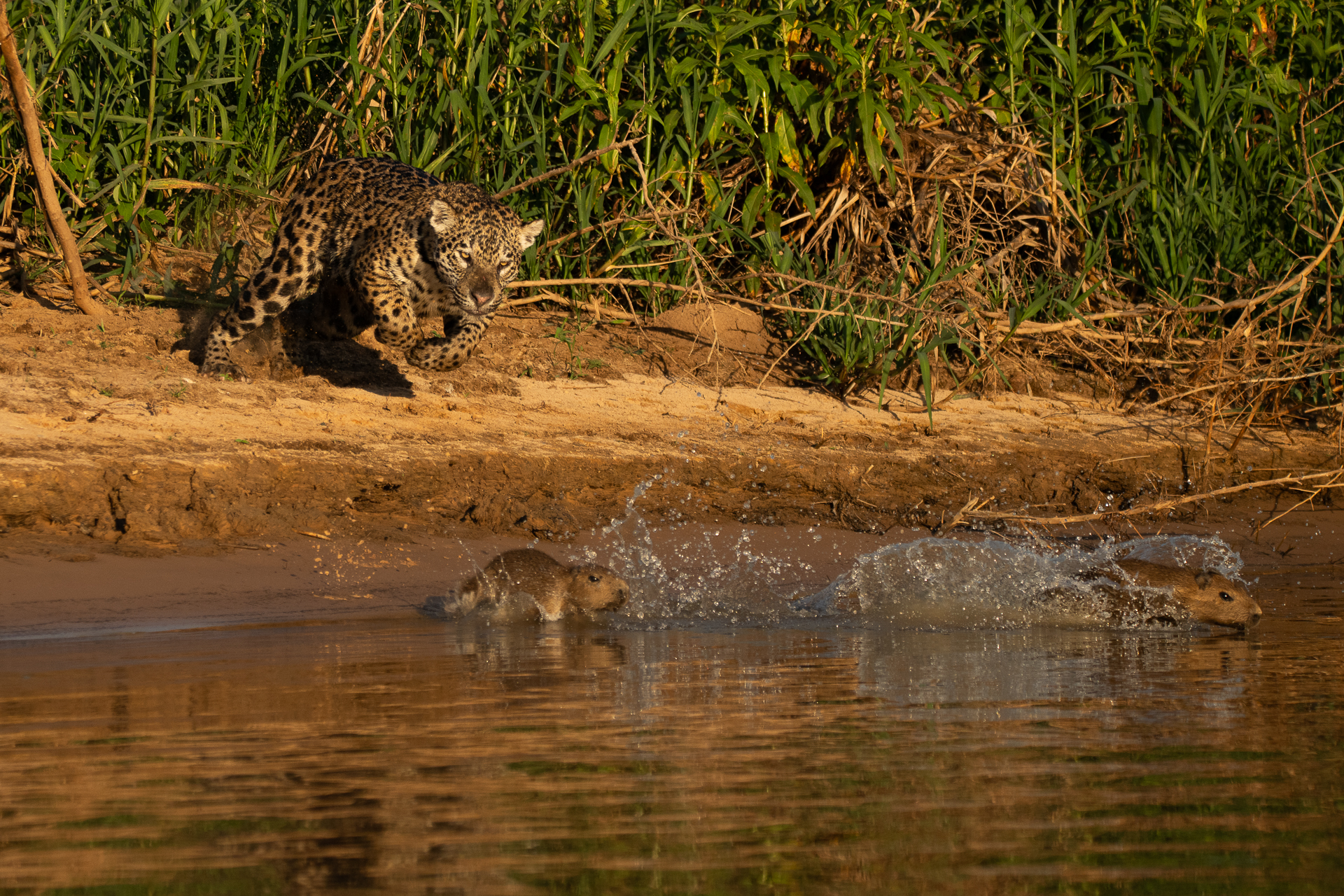
A jaguar attempting to prey on two capybaras on the banks of the Três Irmãos River

The park has a large number of jaguars, who live on the capybaras and caimans that are common in the pantanal. A small local tourism industry has developed since this became known to the outside world, arranging guides, boats and camping expeditions, often run by untrained people and without basic safety equipment. As of 2012 the park had no management plan, and technically should be closed to tourism. However, it is visited by tourists, guides and scientists who hope to observe the jaguars. The big cats are shy, and the tourists may drive them away. There are reports that the number of sightings is falling and, when seen, jaguars move away from boats faster than before.

An eco-tourist lodge in the park was closed by court order in 2009. The American owner then built a camp on the other side of the Piquiri River in Mato Grosso do Sul. In 2011 it was reported that the environment police of that state had found problems with the new lodge, which had been built without authorization from the responsible environmental agency. The company was planning to build nine 11 by 4.5 m (36 by 15 ft) buildings from which to observe jaguars passing through the region, and was already receiving German and American tourists. The owners were accused of using bait animals such as pigs, sheep and alligators to attract the jaguars.

== Sources ==
- Fabio Pellegrini (8 June 2011), "Pousada de observação de onças é fechada no Pantanal Sul", O Eco (in Portuguese)
- Lawrence Wahba (24 November 2012), "Observação de onças-pintadas no Pantanal espanta os animais", Época (in Portuguese), archived from the original on 2016-08-15
- Mapa Geológico do Estado de Mato Grosso (PDF), CPRM
- Parque Estadual Encontro das Águas (in Portuguese), Via Rural, archived from the original on August 6, 2016
- "Parque Estadual Encontro das Águas: Proibição da pesca em um lado do rio pode provocar segregação em MT", EcoDebate (in Portuguese), 25 March 2008
- PES Encontro das Águas (in Portuguese), ISA: Instituto Socioambiental
