= Águas do Cuiabá Ecological Station =

Protected area in the state of Mato Grosso, Brazil

- Estação Ecológica Águas do Cuiabá
- IUCN category Ia (strict nature reserve)
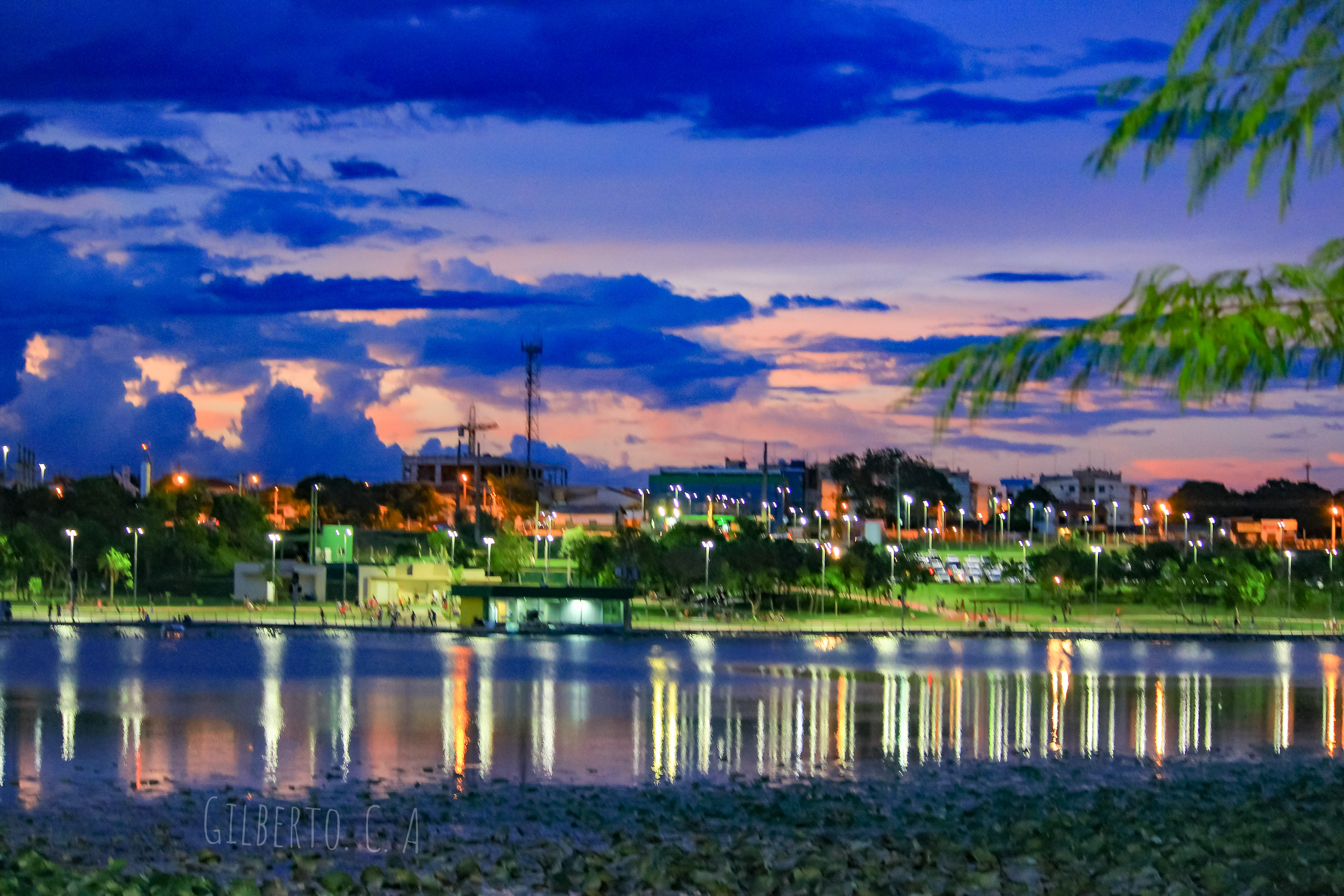
- Águas do Cuiabá Ecological Station

- Location within Brazil
- Nearest city: Cuiabá
- Coordinates: 14.307°S 55.355°W
- Area: 11,328 hectares (27,990 acres)
- Designation: Ecological station
- Created: 10 June 2002

Águas do Cuiabá Ecological Station (Portuguese: Estação Ecológica Águas do Cuiabá), formerly the Águas do Cuiabá State Park, is an ecological station in the state of Mato Grosso, Brazil, a fully protected conservation unit in the cerrado biome. There was controversy about the acquisition of land to expand the unit's area when it was made an ecological station.

== Location ==
The ecological station covers parts of the municipalities of Nobres (82%) and Rosário Oeste (18%) in the state of Mato Grosso. It has an area of 11,328 hectares (27,990 acres). It is contained within the Cabeceiras do Rio Cuiabá Environmental Protection Area. It is in the cerrado biome, with about 57% pioneer formations of savannah contact and 43% savannah.

== History ==
The Águas do Cuiabá State Park was created on 10 June 2002. The Cuiabá River was badly contaminated with garbage and raw sewage. Creation of the park by governor Rogério Salles was part of a program to improve its water quality.

The state park had an area of 10,600 hectares (26,000 acres). The park was administered by the Mato Grosso Secretary of State for the Environment. The purpose was to ensure protection of water resources and viability of movement of species of native fauna, preserve significant samples of ecosystems in the area, and provide controlled opportunities for public use, education and scientific research.

The state park was reclassified as an ecological station on 13 November 2014, with redefined boundaries, now covering 11,328 hectares (27,990 acres). The decree was made by governor Silval Barbosa during the last days of his administration. An area of 727.9 hectares (1,799 acres) owned by doctor Filinto Correa da Costa was added. The value of the small addition was questionable, since it was below rather than above the park, and only contained one spring. A subsequent audit found various irregularities in the purchase. The owner had suggested the expropriation, the area was over-stated by 40 hectares (99 acres) and the compensation of R$7 million was based on a valuation of more than double market prices.

== Sources ==
- "Auditoria executada pela CGE subsidia investigação da Operação Seven", Mato Grosso Mais (in Portuguese), 2 February 2016
- Conservação Internacional (2005), Megadiversidade
- ESEC Águas do Cuiabá (in Portuguese), ISA: Instituto Socioambiental
- Fogo Amigo (2 February 2016), "O ambientalista", Midia News (in Portuguese)
- "MT ganha novo parque de preservação", Diário de Cuiabá (in Portuguese), 6 June 2002
- PE Águas do Cuiabá (in Portuguese), WWF
