= Piquirí River (São Lourenço) =

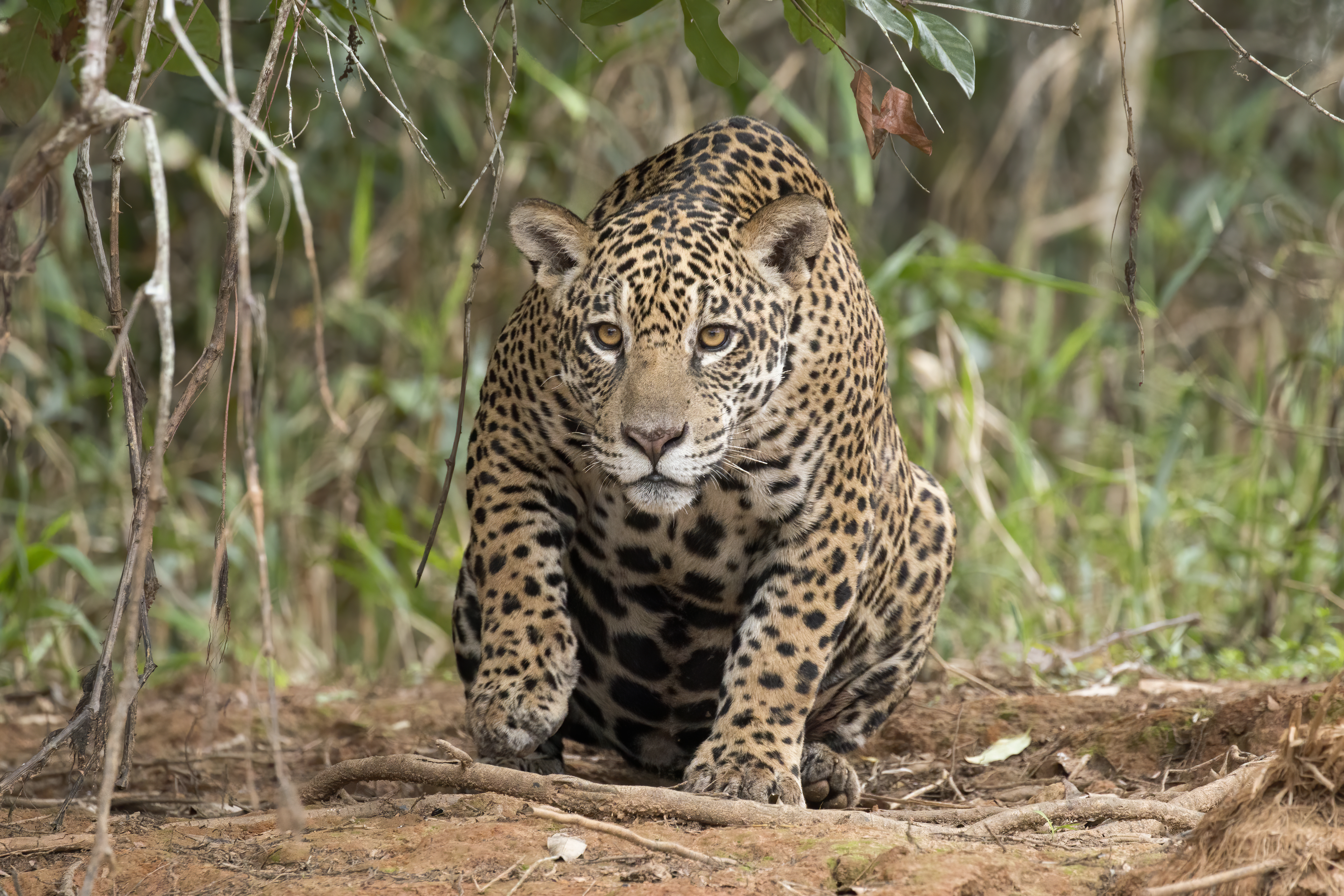
- Female Pantanal jaguar, Piquirí River

- Location within Brazil
- Native name: Rio Piquirí (Portuguese)

Location
- Country: Brazil

Physical characteristics
- Source
  - location: Mato Grosso state
- Mouth
  - location: São Lourenço River
  - coordinates: 17.307772°S 56.719868°W

Basin features
- River system: São Lourenço River

The Piquirí River (Portuguese: Rio Piquirí) is a river of Mato Grosso state in western Brazil. It is a tributary of the São Lourenço River.

== Course ==
The Piquirí River rises in the south of Mato Grosso at the convergence of the Peixe de Couro and the Itiquira rivers. It flows west to the border between Mato Grosso and Mato Grosso do Sul, where it is joined by the Correntes River. It continues to meander west along the border between Mato Grosso and Mato Grosso do Sul, receiving the Braço de São Lourenço River from the right (north). It defines the southern boundary of the Encontro das Águas State Park, joining the São Lourenço at the southwest boundary of the park. The region, rich in watercourses, supports diverse pantanal vegetation.

== See also ==
- List of rivers of Mato Grosso

== Sources ==
- Mapa Geológico do Estado de Mato Grosso (PDF), CPRM
- PES Encontro das Águas (in Portuguese), ISA: Instituto Socioambiental
