= Rondonópolis Airport =

Maestro Marinho Franco Airport Aeroporto Maestro Marinho Franco
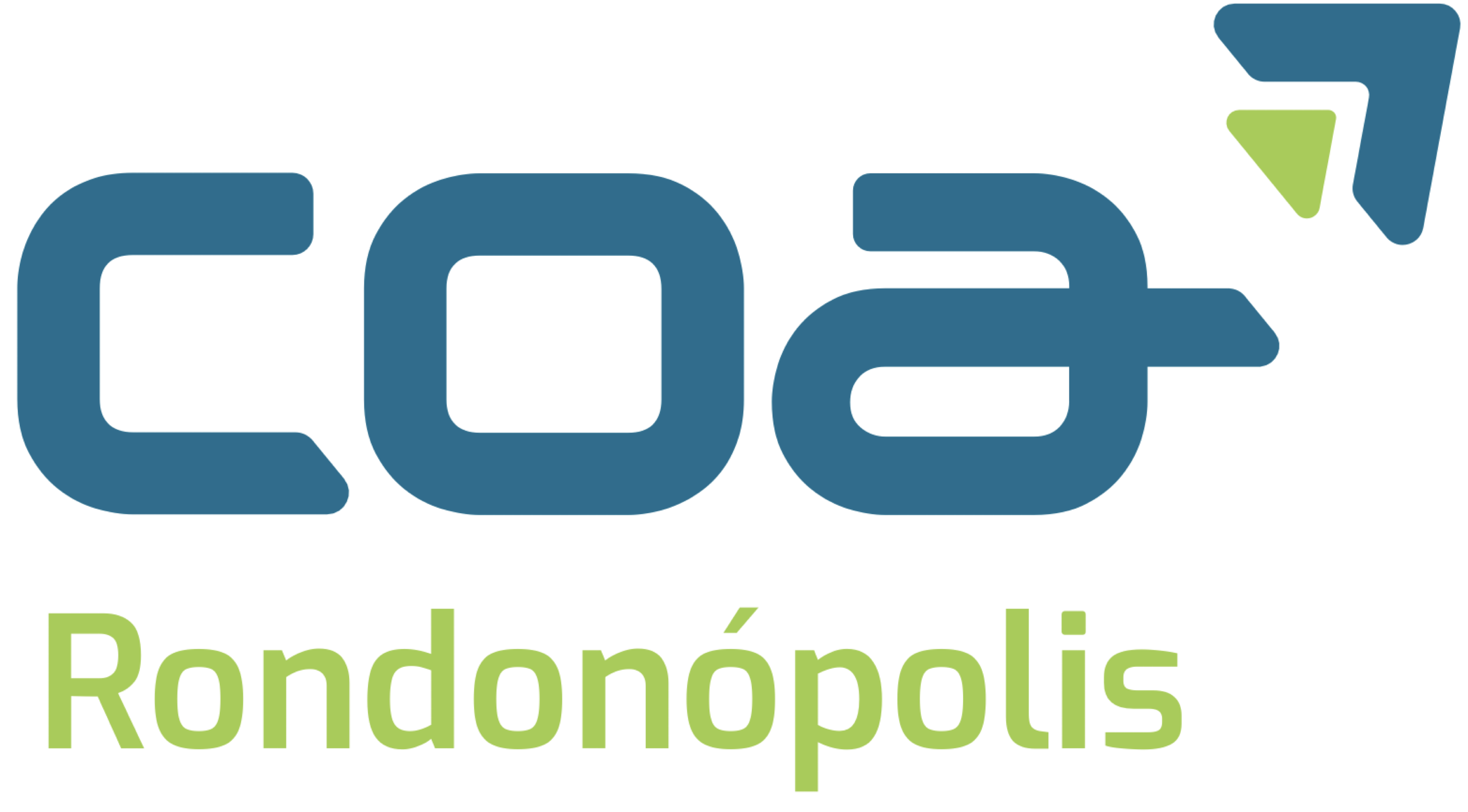
- IATA: ROO; ICAO: SBRD; LID: MT0004

Summary
- Airport type: Public
- Operator: Aeroeste (2019–present)
- Serves: Rondonópolis
- Time zone: BRT−1 (UTC−04:00)
- Elevation AMSL: 447 m (1,467 ft)
- Coordinates: 16°35′17″S 054°43′18″W
- Website: centroeste-airports.com.br/aeroporto-de-cuiaba/#coa-rondonopolis

Map
- Location in Brazil

Runways
Direction	Length		Surface
Direction	m	ft	Surface
02/20	1,850	6,070	Asphalt

Statistics (2023)
- Passengers: 69,571 ▲241%
- Aircraft Operations: 408 ▲63%
- Statistics: Centro-Oeste Airports; Sources: Airport Website, ANAC, DECEA

Maestro Marinho Franco Airport (IATA: ROO, ICAO: SBRD) formerly SWRD, is the airport serving Rondonópolis, Brazil.

It is operated by Aeroeste.

== History ==
On March 15, 2019 Aeroeste won a 30-year concession to operate the airport.

== Airlines and destinations ==
Airlines	Destinations
Azul Brazilian Airlines	Campinas
LATAM Brasil	São Paulo–Guarulhos (begins 14 December 2026)

== Access ==
The airport is located 20 km (12 mi) from downtown Rondonópolis.

== See also ==
- List of airports in Brazil
