= Rosário Oeste =

- Municipality
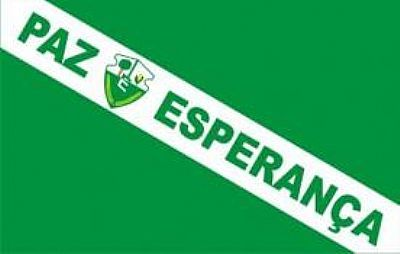
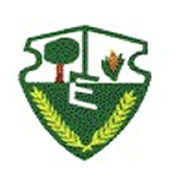
- Flag Coat of arms
- Motto(s): Nossa Terra, Nossa Gente (Our Land, Our People)
- Localization of Rosario Oestea in Mato Grosso

- Localization in Brazil
- Coordinates: 14°50′09″S 56°25′40″W
- Country: Brazil
- Region: Center-West
- State: Mato Grosso
- Mesoregion: Centro-Sul Mato-Grossense
- Founded: June 25, 1843

Government
  - Mayor: Joao Balbino (PSB)

Area
  - Total: 3,398.489 sq mi (8,802.047 km^{2})
- Elevation: 630 ft (192 m)

Population (2020)
  - Total: 17,054
  - Density: 5.2/sq mi (2.01/km^{2})
- Time zone: UTC−4 (AMT)
- Demonym: rosariense

Rosário Oeste is a municipality in the state of Mato Grosso in the Central-West Region of Brazil.

The municipality contains part of the 11,328-hectare (27,990-acre) Águas do Cuiabá Ecological Station, a fully protected conservation unit in the cerrado biome.

== See also ==
- List of municipalities in Mato Grosso
