= Chapada dos Guimarães =

- Municipality
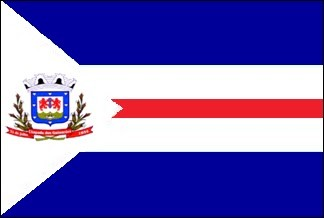
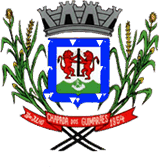
- Flag Coat of arms

- Location in Mato Grosso state

- Location in Brazil
- Coordinates: 15°27′39″S 55°45′00″W
- Country: Brazil
- Region: Central-West
- State: Mato Grosso

Population (2020)
  - Total: 19,453
- Time zone: UTC−3 (BRT)

Chapada dos Guimarães is a municipality located in central Brazil, 62 km from the city of Cuiabá, the capital of Mato Grosso State. It is home to the Chapada dos Guimarães National Park. Outside this town is the geographic center of South America.

The municipality contains 77% of the 3,534-hectare (8,730-acre) Rio da Casca Ecological Station, a strictly protected conservation unit created in 1994. The municipal seat contains the 31-hectare (77-acre) Quineira State Park, created in 2006.
