= São Lourenço River (Mato Grosso) =

River in South America

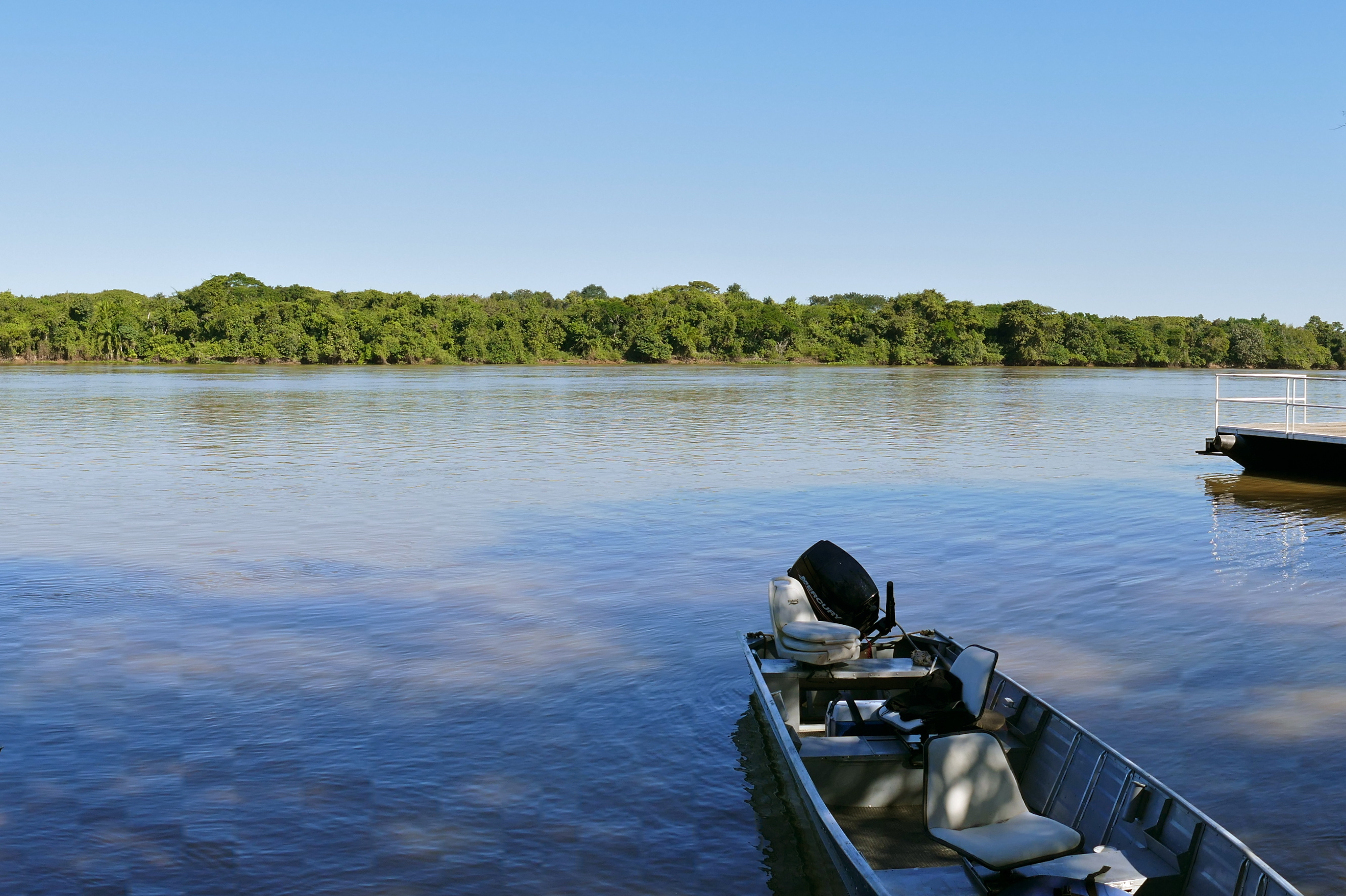

- Location within Brazil
- Native name: Rio São Lourenço (Portuguese)

Physical characteristics
- Source
  - location: Mato Grosso state
- Mouth
  - location: Paraguay River
  - coordinates: 17.901257°S 57.459036°W

Basin features
- River system: Paraguay River

The São Lourenço River is a tributary of the Paraguay River within the Pantanal, an alluvial plain that spans portions of Brazil, Bolivia and Paraguay. The São Lourenço river basin lies in the Mato Grosso state of Brazil.

== Course ==
The São Lourenço River rises in the south of Mato Grosso, and is sometimes called the Pingara River in its upper reaches. It flows west into the Encontro das Águas State Park, where it is joined by the Cuiabá River. The São Lourenço continues southwest across the park, then defines the west border of the southern part of the park. The park is bounded to the south by the Piquiri River, which defines the border with the state of Mato Grosso do Sul. The Piquiri flows west to join the São Lourenço at the southwest boundary of the park. The São Lourenço continues in a southwest direction along the border between Mato Grosso and Mato Grosso do Sul until it joins the Paraguay River. It forms part of the southern boundary of the Pantanal Matogrossense National Park just before joining the Paraguay.

== See also ==
- List of rivers of Mato Grosso

== Sources ==
- Mapa Geológico do Estado de Mato Grosso (PDF), CPRM
- Nature Conservancy Staff (2007), New Agreement to Protect the Pantanal, The Nature Conservancy, archived from the original on 2007-11-12
- PARNA do Pantanal Mato-Grossense (in Portuguese), ISA: Instituto Socioambiental
- PES Encontro das Águas (in Portuguese), ISA: Instituto Socioambiental
- Swarts, Frederick (2000), Pantanal, Waterland Research Institute
