= Cuiabá River =

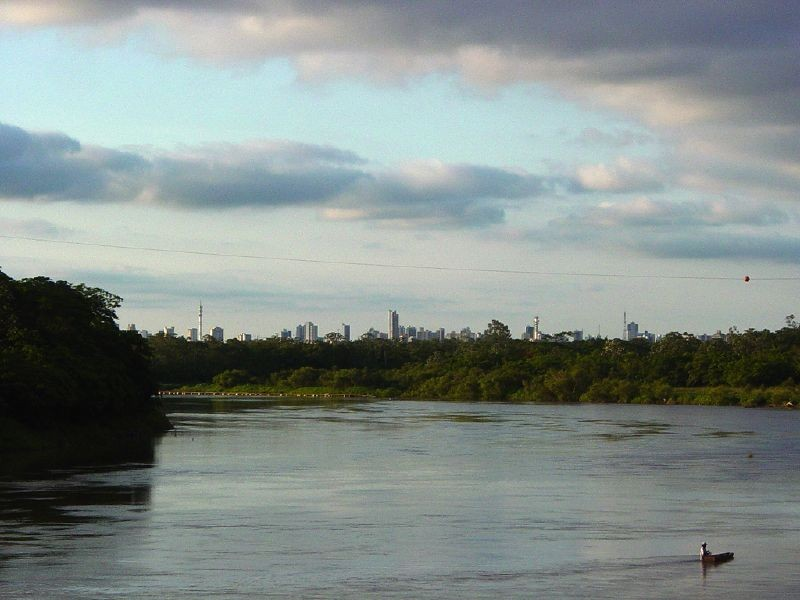

- Location within Brazil
- Native name: Rio Cuiabá (Portuguese)

Location
- Country: Brazil

Physical characteristics
- Source
  - location: Mato Grosso
  - coordinates: 17.151982°S 56.649220°W
- Mouth
  - location: São Lourenço River
  - coordinates: 17.158563°S 56.643782°W
- Length: 480 kilometres (300 mi)

Basin features
- River system: Río de la Plata Basin
- Tributaries
  - right: Caçanje River

The Cuiabá River (Portuguese: Rio Cuiabá) is a Brazilian river in the western state of Mato Grosso that flows in the Río de la Plata Basin. It is a tributary of the São Lourenço River.

== Course ==
In its upper reaches the Cuiabá River flows through the 11,328-hectare (27,990-acre) Águas do Cuiabá Ecological Station, which was created as a state park in June 2002 as part of an effort to clean up the water of the river, which was polluted with garbage and raw sewage. At Cuiabá its lower portion enters the Pantanal ecosystem and region, flowing through extensive and important Ramsar Convention protected wetlands for waterfowl, migratory birds, and other wildlife.

The Cuiabá continues southwest and forms part of the eastern border of the Encontro das Águas State Park. On some maps it is now called the Canabu River. The Cuiabá / Canabu cuts across the park, where it joins the São Lourenço River, or Pingara River, which also cuts across the park from the east. The Cuiabá River is 480 kilometres (300 mi) long to the point where it joins the São Lourenço River. After their confluence the subsequent river continues to be named the Cuiabá River on some maps. The combined river flows through the Pantanal Matogrossense National Park, and is a tributary of the Paraguay River.

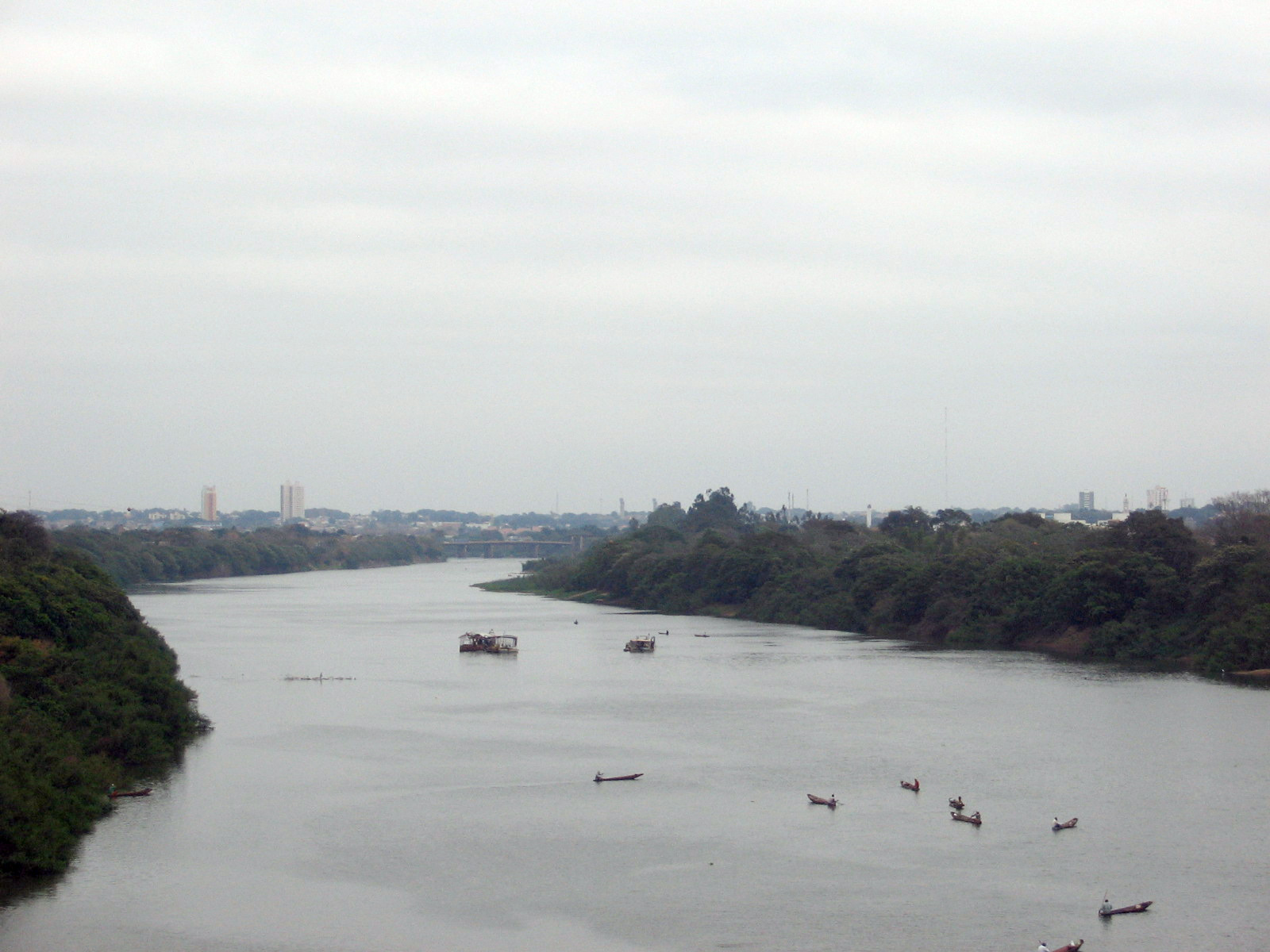
Cuiabá River, in Cuiabá, Mato Grosso

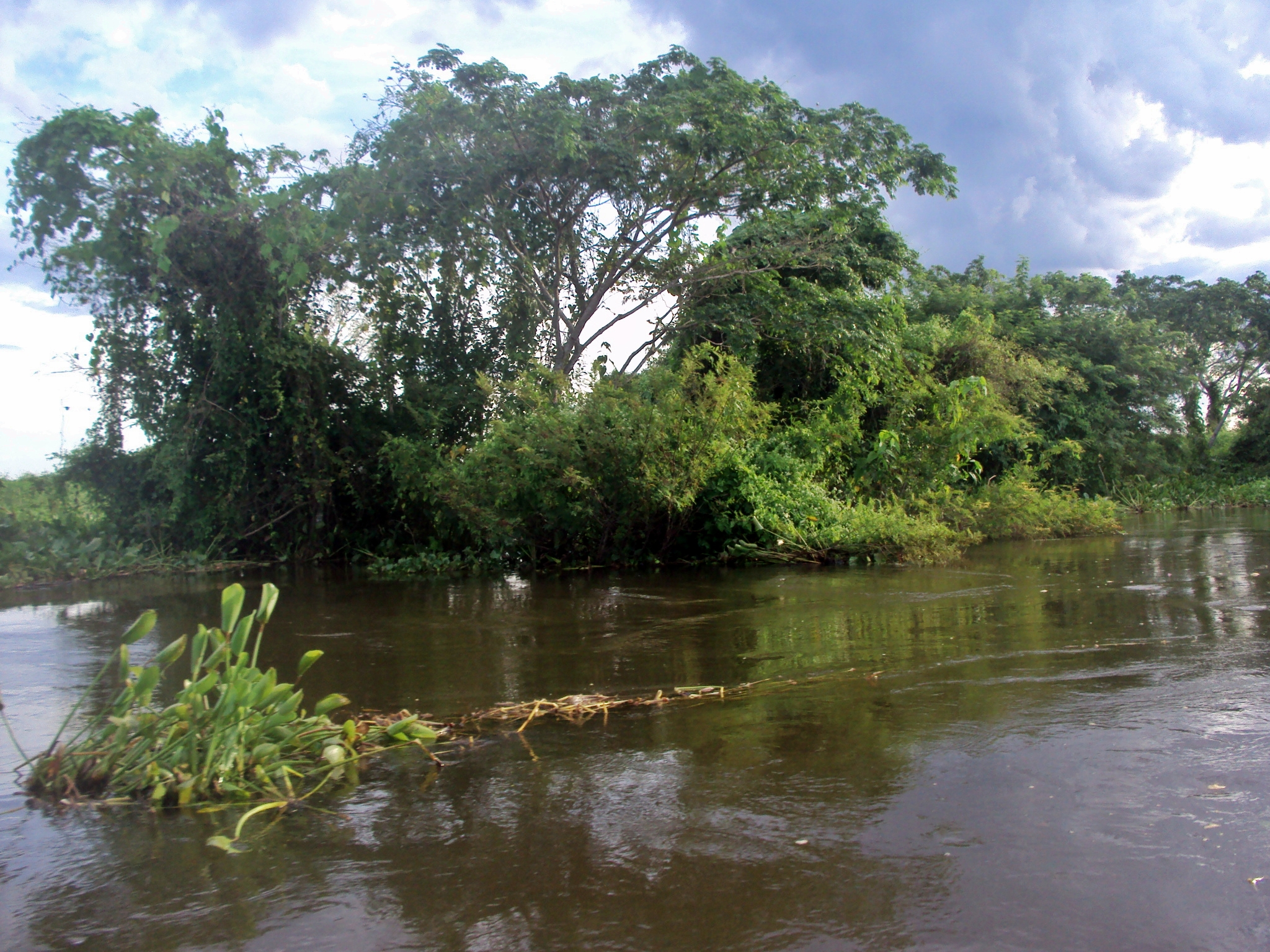
Cuiabá River near Porto Jofre, in the Pantanal, Mato Grosso

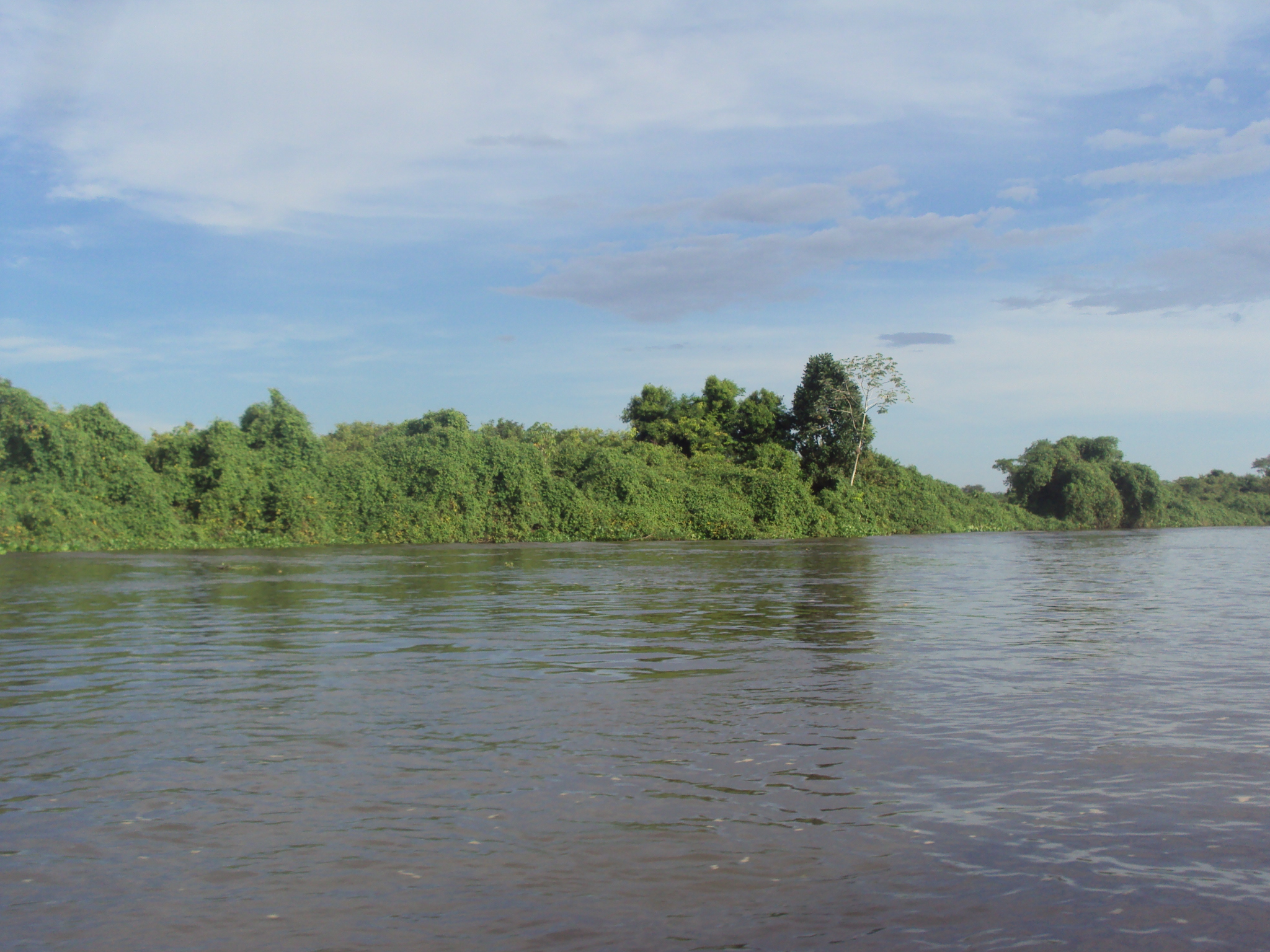
Cuiabá River, below Corumbá in Mato Grosso, southern Brazil

== See also ==
- Río de la Plata Basin
- List of tributaries of the Río de la Plata
- Brazilian Gold Rush § Cuiaba gold Rush

== Sources ==
- Cuiabá River, Encyclopædia Britannica
- Mapa Geológico do Estado de Mato Grosso (PDF), CPRM
- "MT ganha novo parque de preservação", Diário de Cuiabá (in Portuguese), 6 June 2002, archived from the original on 2016-06-03
- PES Encontro das Águas (in Portuguese), ISA: Instituto Socioambiental
