= Parima =

Parima may refer to:

- Lake Parime, a legendary lake in South America, reputedly the location of the fabled city of El Dorado, sought by many European explorers but never found.
- Parima Tapirapecó National Park, Venezuela
- Parima River, Venezuela
- Parima Mountains, Venezuela
- Parima (d. 1886), second to last monarch of the island of Rapa Iti
