= Branquinho =

Branquinho, a diminutive form of Branco (meaning white in Portuguese and Galician), may refer to:

- Branquinho River, a river in Roraima, Brazil
- Beijinho, or branquinho, a Brazilian birthday party candy

== People ==
=== Mononym or given name ===
- Branquinho (footballer, born 1983), Brazilian football winger
- Branquinho (footballer, born 1989), Brazilian football striker
- Branquinho da Fonseca (1905–1974), Portuguese writer

=== Surname ===
- Carlos de Liz-Teixeira Branquinho (1902–1973), Portuguese diplomat
- Diogo Branquinho (born 1994), Portuguese handballer
- Veronique Branquinho (born 1973), Belgian fashion designer

== See also ==
- Branquinha, a municipality in Alagoas, Brazil
- Trebbiano, or Branquinha, an Italian wine grape
- Brinquinho, a Portuguese musical instrument
