= List of rivers of Roraima =

List of rivers in Roraima (Brazilian State).

The list is arranged by drainage basin, with respective tributaries indented under each larger stream's name and ordered from downstream to upstream. Roraima is located entirely within the Amazon Basin, most of the state is within the Branco River sub-watershed.

== By Drainage Basin ==
- Amazon River (Pará, Amazonas)
  - Uatumã River (Amazonas)
    - Jatapu River
  - Rio Negro
    - Jauaperi River
      - Macucuaú River
      - Alalaú River
      - Branquinho River
      - Trairi River
    - Branco River
      - Xeriuini River
        - Novo River
      - Itapará River
      - Catrimani River
        - Pacu River
        - Arapari River
        - Jundiá River
        - Lôbo d'Almada River
      - Água Boa do Univini River
        - Capivara River
      - Anauá River
        - Barauana River
          - Itã River
          - Barauaninha River
        - Caroaebe River
        - Novo River
      - Ajarani River
      - Cachorro River
      - Mucajaí River
        - Apiaú River
      - Quitauau River
      - Cauamé River
      - Uraricoera River
        - Parimé River
          - Cauaruau River
          - Paricarana River
        - Amajari River
          - Ereo River
          - Acari River
          - Pacu River
        - Furo Santa Rosa
          - Traida River
          - Uraricaá River
            - Coimim River
            - Ericó River
            - Tucutol River
        - Aracacá River
        - Auari River
          - Uauaris River
        - Parima River
          - Uatatas River
      - Tacutu River
        - Surumu River
          - Cotingo River
            - Quinó River
            - Panari River
          - Miang River
            - Xaparu River
        - Viruaquim River
        - Maú River
          - Maracani River
          - Uailan River
          - Canã River
        - Caju River
        - Arraia River
        - Urubu River
    - Jufari River
      - Preto River

== Alphabetically ==
- Acari River
- Água Boa do Univini River
- Ajarani River
- Alalaú River
- Amajari River
- Anauá River
- Apiaú River
- Aracacá River
- Arapari River
- Arraia River
- Auari River
- Barauana River
- Barauaninha River
- Branco River
- Branquinho River
- Cachorro River
- Caju River
- Canã River
- Capivara River
- Caroaebe River
- Catrimani River
- Cauamé River
- Cauaruau River
- Coimim River
- Cotingo River
- Ereo River
- Ericó River
- Furo Santa Rosa
- Itã River
- Itapará River
- Jatapu River
- Jauaperi River
- Jufari River
- Jundiá River
- Lôbo d'Almada River
- Macucuaú River
- Maracani River
- Maú River
- Miang River
- Mucajaí River
- Rio Negro
- Novo River
- Novo River
- Pacu River
- Pacu River
- Panari River
- Paricarana River
- Parima River
- Parimé River
- Preto River
- Quinó River
- Quitauau River
- Surumu River
- Tacutu River
- Traida River
- Trairi River
- Tucutol River
- Uailan River
- Uatatas River
- Uauaris River
- Uraricaá River
- Uraricoera River
- Urubu River
- Viruaquim River
- Xaparu River
- Xeriuini River
