= Chaetostoma jegui =

Conservation status
- Least Concern (IUCN 3.1)

Scientific classification
- Kingdom: Animalia
- Phylum: Chordata
- Class: Actinopterygii
- Order: Siluriformes
- Family: Loricariidae
- Genus: Chaetostoma
- Species: C. jegui

Binomial name
- Chaetostoma jegui Rapp Py-Daniel, 1991

Species of fish

Chaetostoma jegui is a species of catfish in the family Loricariidae. It is endemic to Brazil, where it occurs in the basins of the Takutu River and the Uraricoera River in the Branco River drainage. The species reaches 16.8 cm (6.6 in) SL.
