= Pacu River =

There are several rivers named Pacu River in Brazil:

- Pacu River (Amajari River tributary)
- Pacu River (Catrimani River tributary)
- Pacu River (Pará)

== See also ==
- Pacu (disambiguation)
