= Zapara =

Zápara or Záparo may refer to:

- Zápara people, an ethnic group of Ecuador and Peru
- Zápara language, their language

== See also ==
- Sapara (disambiguation)
- Xaparu River, in Brazil
