= Roraima National Forest =

National forest in Brazil

- Floresta Nacional de Roraima
- IUCN category IV (habitat/species management area)
- Location within Brazil
- Nearest city: Boa Vista, Roraima
- Coordinates: 3°02′17″N 61°48′40″W
- Area: 167,268.74 hectares (413,330.1 acres)
- Designation: National forest
- Created: 1 March 1989
- Administrator: ICMBio.

The Roraima National Forest (Portuguese: Floresta Nacional de Roraima) is a national forest in the state of Roraima, Brazil.

== History ==
The Roraima National Forest and Amazonas National Forest were created by President José Sarney in 1989. The Roraima National Forest was created by decree nº 97545 of 1 March 1989 and covered 2,664,685 hectares (6,584,580 acres) of the Amazon biome. This had the effect of dividing the territory of the Yanomami people into several separate areas. In 1990 three gold mining reserves were created within the Roraima National Forest. The Yanomami Indigenous Territory was demarcated in 1992 in the lead up to the Earth Summit in Rio de Janeiro. The indigenous territory was created on 25 May 1992 with an area of 9,664,975 hectares (23,882,670 acres), and it was thought that this territory completely covered the national forest area. This was followed by a vigorous international campaign in support of the Yanomami people. The gold mines were closed and the miners removed.

In an indigenous territory the indigenous people have the exclusive right of use according to their customs and traditions. Although technically the Roraima National Forest remained, exploitation of the forest would violate these rights. In 2001 IBAMA realized that 5% of the forest, or 142,000 hectares (350,000 acres), had been left out of the indigenous territory, and decided to repossess the unit. However, in the mid-1990s two settlements, Samaúma and Vila Nova, had taken 50,000 hectares (120,000 acres), leaving 92,000 hectares (230,000 acres) unclaimed. To regularize the situation, the boundaries were revised by law 12058 of 13 October 2009, and the forest now has an area of 167,268.74 hectares (413,330.1 acres). The resized national forest now excludes the indigenous territory.

== Location ==
The Roraima National Forest is in the municipalities of Alto Alegre and Mucajaí of the state of Roraima. It adjoins the Yanomami Indigenous Territory to the west. Average annual rainfall is 2,000 millimetres (79 in). Temperatures range from 22 to 39 °C (72 to 102 °F) with an average of 24 °C (75 °F). The climate is tropical rainy in the eastern sector and tropical rainy monsoon on the west.

The terrain is undulating with hills that stand out from the surrounding land. The forest contains parts of the Mucajaí, Apiaú and Uraricoera sub-basins of the Branco River basin. In the Mucajaí sub-basin there is small farming and extensive livestock raising. There are also stretches of seasonal forest and dense rainforest in rugged terrain. The Apiaú is a right tributary of the Mucajaí and delimits the southern boundary of the national forest where it meets the Yanomami Indigenous Territory. A small part of the north of the national forest is in the Uraricoera basin, an area of extensive cattle ranching with some subsistence and semi-commercial farming.

== Conservation ==
The Roraima National Forest is administered by the Federal Chico Mendes Institute for Biodiversity Conservation (ICMBio). It is classed as IUCN protected area category IV (habitat/species management area), with the purpose of supporting sustainable multiple use of forest resources and scientific research, with emphasis on methods for sustainable exploitation of native forests. The conservation unit would be included in the proposed Northern Amazon Ecological Corridor.

== Sources ==
- Ayres, José Márcio; Da Fonseca, Gustavo A. B.; Rylands, Anthony B.; Queiroz, Helder L.; Pinto, Luiz Paulo; Masterson, Donald; Cavalcanti, Roberto B. (2005), Os Corredores Ecológicos das Florestas Tropicais do Brasil (PDF) (in Portuguese), Sociedade Civil Mamirauá
- Características da UC (in Portuguese), ICMBio
- Carlos Alberto Ricardo (22 August 2011), Gestão da FLONA Amazonas (PDF) (in Portuguese), Instituto Socioambiental – ISA
- Floresta Nacional de Roraima (in Portuguese), Chico Mendes Institute for Biodiversity Conservation
- "Terra Indígena Yanomami", Terras Indígenas no Brasil (in Portuguese), ISA: Instituto Socioambiental
- Unidade de Conservação: Floresta Nacional de Roraima (in Portuguese), MMA: Ministério do Meio Ambiente
