= Yanomami humanitarian crisis =

Humanitarian crisis in the Yanomami territory in Brazil

- Duration: 2019–2023
- Location: Yanomami Indigenous Territory, Brazil
- Type: Mass deaths, famine, forced displacements and other major human rights violations

During the presidency of Jair Bolsonaro (2019–2022) and the second presidency of Lula da Silva (2023), a series of mass deaths, famine, forced displacements and other major human rights violations took place in the Brazilian Yanomami Indigenous Territory. Such events reportedly started or were aggravated from 2019 on as a consequence of rampant exploitation of natural resources by individuals and companies with state approval, and have been frequently said to constitute a genocide against the Yanomami people.

== Background ==
After being elected in the 2018 Brazilian general elections and taking office under his pledge to loosen environmental policies, especially in the Brazilian Amazon region, then president Jair Bolsonaro repealed several presidential decrees banning illegal mining and illegal logging nationwide, and effectively dismantled environment protection agencies.

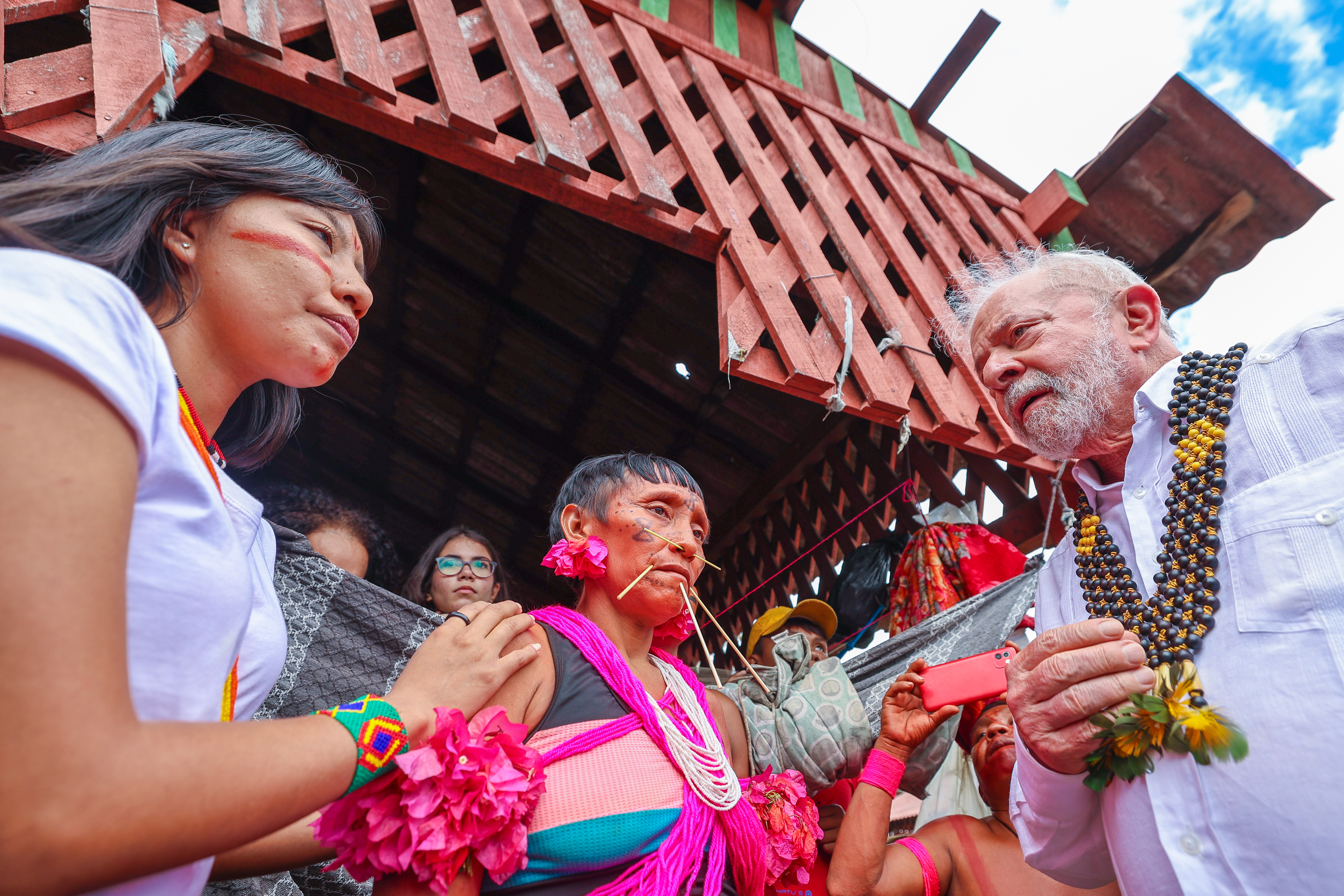
President Luiz Inácio Lula da Silva announces emergency measures to tackle the Yanomami humanitarian crisis.

In January 2023, following the end of Bolsonaro's administration due to his defeat in the 2022 Brazilian general elections, new government officials appointed by President Luiz Inácio Lula da Silva took office and immediately were briefed about an escalation of the Yanomami crisis. Over 20,000 illegal miners were estimated to have invaded and exploited the Yanomami reservation, prompting comparisons with the 1980's Serra Pelada gold rush, also in the Amazon.

== Incidents ==
Government neglect, agricultural encroachment and illegal activities affecting the area preceded the creation of the Yanomami reserve in 1992. The first contacts between the Yanomami indigenous peoples and the wider Brazilian population intermittently happened between the 1910s and 1940s; in the following two decades, such contacts increased due to religious missions in the region, road construction work and mining projects by the military regime in the area in the 1970s, during which the first reports of epidemics especially of flu, measles and whooping cough emerged linked to the decimation of entire Yanomami communities. Ever since, the region has suffered from being a hotspot for illegal activities, notably illegal mining, leading to mercury poisoning of several tribespeople, including infants.

=== Illegal mining logistics ===
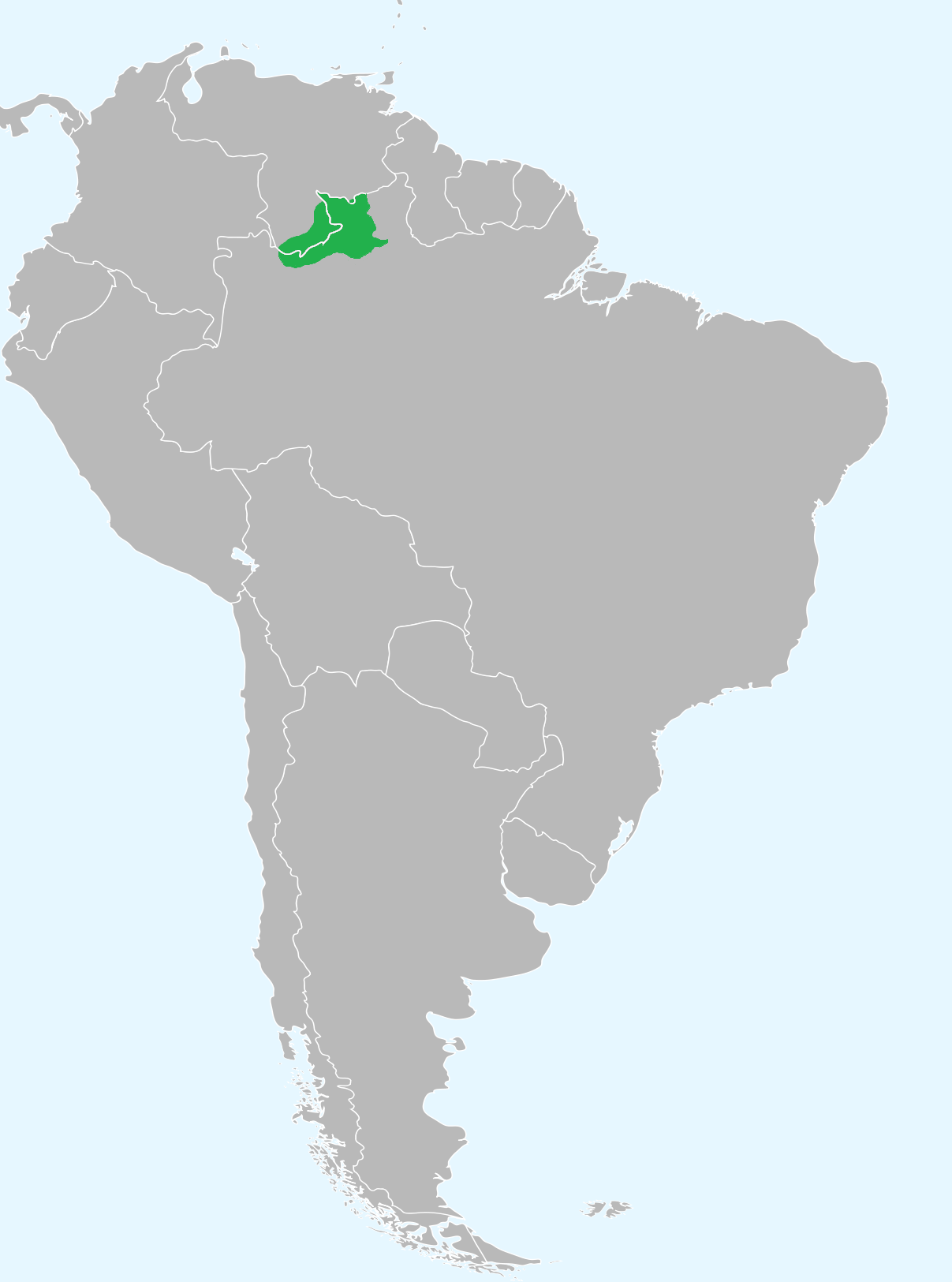
The Yanomami indigenous territory location.

A network of politicians, local public servants, farmers, business people and companies was organized to illegally exploit gold and cassiterite as well as to launder the criminal activities in the Yanomami territory. Hidden runaways were built in dozens of nearby and even distant rural properties (as far as in Boa Vista). Some of the gold extracted has been taken to Venezuela and French Guyana, and refinery facilities and depots have also been used in the scheme.

Additionally, Rodrigo Martins de Mello, a pro-Bolsonaro businessman, was charged with operating under an "irregular license" and heading another criminal organization operating in the reservation.

On January 16, 2023, Brazilian newspaper Folha de São Paulo reported that Brazilian former army general Augusto Heleno, a former minister under the Bolsonaro government, authorized a convicted drug dealer to run a gold mining project in the Yanomami region. On January 27, Brazilian newspaper O Globo reported that the Brazilian Central Bank failed to crack down on gold laundering. The failure has reportedly emboldened some 20,000 illegal miners to further exploit indigenous territories including the Yanomami reservation.

Legal mining companies such as M.M. Gold (rebranded from Gana Gold) have also masqueraded illegal activities by faking far more than permitted amounts of gold to be extracted in their concessions, according to a report by Mongabay and The Intercept Brazil. Cryptocurrencies have been also used to launder criminal activity and transfer financial assets to stooges.

==== Financing ====
On January 24, 2023, two reports by Brazilian newspaper O Globo detailed that the Bolsonaro government allocated BRL 872 million (approximately USD 171 million) from the federal budget to an opaque evangelical non-governmental organisation from 2019 to 2023. According to indigenous leaders in the Yanomami territory the NGO has not worked in the region since it started receiving Bolsonaro administration earmarks, raising suspicions of widespread corruption. Additionally, government funds allocated to transport doctors and nurses to the region during the Bolsonaro administration were directed to transportation companies owned by illegal miners, who were also reportedly tipped off about police raids and operations hours or days before they took place.

==== Communications ====
A Brasil de Fato report in February 2023 revealed illegal miners operating in the Yanomami territory had access to Starlink's internet via highly inflated prices in the black market, after Starlink announced in May 2022 it was expanding its coverage to the Amazon region in a project with the Bolsonaro government that aimed to connect among other things 19,000 Brazilian schools in rural areas. As of September 2022, however, only 3 schools in the region had been covered by the Starlink's internet service, while its equipment had been traded among illegal miners since November 2022, with the first Yanomami community only receiving it in late January 2023. Despite Starlink's ban on device resales, the company did not contact Brazilian authorities to suspend its service for miners or take any legal action against them.

Internet devices of American company Viasat had also been sold in the black market in the region, and local indigenous leaders said internet access crucially enabled illegal miners to scale up their activities.

=== Health complications ===
Medical officials working in the Roraima state where the Yanomami reservation is located have noted a "total lack of proper medical care in the region" adding that malaria-infected indigenous patients have rapidly evolved into severe liver damage after multiple untreated infections by Plasmodium falciparum, one of the four species of protozoa capable of causing malaria in humans. Onchocerciasis, a parasitic disease linked to extreme poverty, has been eradicated in the entire Brazilian territory except for the Yanomami reservation, where it still represents a disease burden.

=== Sexual abuse, rape and illegal adoptions ===
A report published by Instituto Socioambiental and co-authored by the Hutukara Yanomami and the Wanasseduume Ye'kwana indigenous associations showed testimonies by indigenous women who said illegal miners offered them food or gold in exchange for sex with them and/or their children. Three 13-year-olds reportedly died after being raped by illegal miners in 2020. Sexually transmitted infections have also been reported among Yanomami people. Additionally, the federal government opened probes into reports of illegal adoptions and systemic sexual abuse against Yanomami children. As of February 2023, at least 30 girls and teenagers are pregnant due to rapes by miners, according to reports from an indigenous association.

=== Death toll ===
Though estimates of overexploitation-related deaths of the Yanomami people are very scattered and under-reported due to the remoteness of the territory, reports revealed 99 Yanomami children aged 5-year-old or younger died in 2022, of which a third was due to pneumonia, and from 2019 to 2023 a total of 570 Yanomami children died because of malnutrition, hunger and mercury poisoning.

During the first year of the government of Luiz Inácio Lula da Silva, the number of deaths reached a peak in 2023, with 428 fatalities recorded over the year. In the following year, the number declined to 337; however, this figure remained higher than the level observed at the onset of the humanitarian crisis.

== Aftermath ==
On January 21, 2023, the Brazilian Health Ministry declared a medical emergency in the indigenous territory. On the same day, a trip to the territory located in the northernmost Roraima state was made by Lula and top government officials including the Health minister Nísia Trindade, the Justice minister Flávio Dino and the Indigenous Affairs minister Sônia Guajajara to announce a federal aid package to the region and the Yanomami. On January 24 a field hospital run by the federal government started being set up by the Brazilian military in Roraima's capital Boa Vista and opened three days later. Some 5,000 emergency food kits including meals for indigenous children were sent and distributed into the Yanomami territory. Over a thousand indigenous people in severe health conditions had been rescued from the reservation, as of January 2023.

=== Investigations ===
On January 18, Brazilian leading medical institute Fiocruz warned government officials that a batch of the malaria drug ASMQ meant to Yanomami patients went missing and was reportedly diverted to illegal miners who have since sold it.

On January 30, Brazil's Supreme Federal Court authorized a probe into the handling of the humanitarian crisis by former Bolsonaro government officials as well as into whether genocide has been committed. Investigators were also empowered to gather evidence of the disappearance of illegal aircraft used by miners and seized by the police, and illegal disclosures of police raids to benefit illegal miners, among other actions or lack thereof.

==== International Criminal Court probe ====
In 2019, Jair Bolsonaro was sued by the Arns Commission and the Human Rights Advocacy collective in the International Criminal Court, of which Brazil is a member since 2002, for allegedly "inciting genocide and promoting systemic attacks against indigenous peoples of Brazil". Such crimes are neither covered by any statute of limitations nor necessarily bound to a current authority which means that even if Bolsonaro and other officials leave the government they can still stand trial. In 2020, prosecutors from the International Criminal Court said the complaint is formally under preliminary investigation, a first against a Brazilian leader.

In July 2021, Brazilian indigenous peoples association APIB filed another criminal proceeding against Bolsonaro and other officials in the International Criminal Court for, among other things, failing to manage the Covid-19 pandemic in Brazilian indigenous territories, with over 1,100 indigenous people reportedly dying as a result of that alone. The association also cited reports that Brazilian General Prosecutor Augusto Aras, who is the only authority in Brazil legally allowed to open criminal proceedings against a president and was appointed by Bolsonaro, has been failing to investigate him and his government handling of the crisis.

In 2023 Brazil news website UOL reported that the complaints have been advancing inside the Court's prosecution office.

=== Crackdown ===
The federal government announced several measures to disband and remove the criminal networks operating in the region from the Yanomami territory, including heavy security and medical staff deployment; food and water supplies and garment items to the affected communities and the (re)opening of the indigenous agency Funai outposts in the region. Additionally, a no-fly zone was established over the territory.

On February 8, Brazilian environment agency Ibama launched a massive operation to retake the Yanomami reservation from criminals which included seizing guns, boats and fuel, and destroying mining equipment, a helicopter and a jet. The agency also set up an outpost on the Uraricoera river to stop new supplies from reaching the illegal miners downstream.

As of February 6, 2023, 42 helicopters and jets were seized and 28 more were already destroyed by the Brazilian Federal Police. On February 15, a joint police, prosecutors and Federal Revenue of Brazil auditors task force had R$2 billion (US$357.59 million) frozen from suspects of operating an international smuggling ring that sent some 13 tonnes of illegally-mined gold into Italy, Switzerland, China and the United Arab Emirates.

As of March 21, 2023, the environment and Amazon department of the federal police of Brazil removed almost all of the illegal gold miners within the Yanomami territory. The percentage of the miners removed was estimated to be 85% by the head of the local indigenous health council, Junior Hekurari. The federal police's operations destroyed 250 miner camps (many already deserted) and 70 dredging rafts, as well as seized about 4,500 litres (1,200 US gal) of fuel and 1.2 kilograms (2.6 lb) of gold. Most of the miners fled before the police eviction operation, but police still apprehended at least 805 miners and 94 boats. They were released in favor of seizing or blocking the resources of those funding the illegal mining and dismantling a network amongst the mining camps that trafficked underage girls. Police are seeking international cooperation to use electronic tax receipts and develop technology that uses radio isotopes to determine whether gold on the market came from Yanomami territory.

Ferries and power generators were seized and destroyed by the Brazilian military and police in September 2023. As of that month illegal mining had been 78,51% down from the previous year according to a report by the Brazilian federal government. Small grocery chains located in northern Brazil were found to be supplying food to illegal gold miners operating in the Brazilian-Venezuelan border. They would be paid via transactions with legal mining companies who laundered illegally-extracted gold ore.

==== Escape ====
After a blockade of fuel and food supplies feeding the criminal organizations and a no-fly zone were announced a significant number of illegal miners reportedly gave up on flying and started escaping security forces by land, with some groups trying to cross the border into Venezuela and relatively distant Guyana. Individual flight tickets were reported to be costing 15,000 BRL (nearly 3,000 USD) due to the military siege, and those who could not afford to take a flight were either trying to leave the reservation by boat or remained stranded as their food supplies ran out, according to reports and insiders.

== See also ==
- List of scandals in Brazil
- Genocide of Indigenous peoples in Brazil
