= Serra da Mocidade National Park =

National park in North Brazil

- Parque Nacional Serra da Mocidade
- IUCN category II (national park)
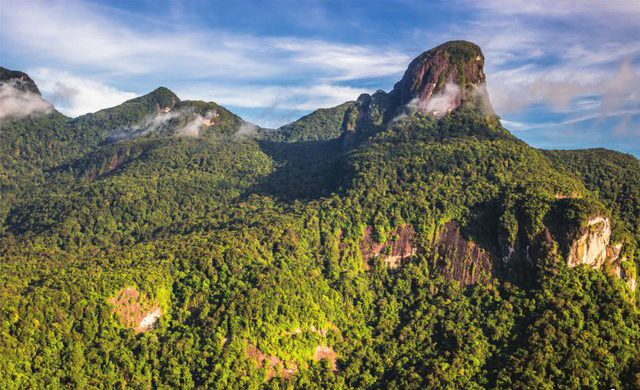
- A peak of the serra

- Location within Brazil
- Nearest city: Caracaraí, Roraima
- Coordinates: 1°08′38″N 61°53′24″W
- Area: 376,813 hectares (931,130 acres)
- Designation: National park
- Created: 29 April 1998
- Administrator: ICMBio

Serra da Mocidade National Park (Portuguese: Parque Nacional Serra da Mocidade) is a national park in the states of Amazonas and Roraima, Brazil.

== Location ==
The park lies in the Amazon biome. It covers 376,813 hectares (931,130 acres). It was established on 29 April 1998, and is administered by the Chico Mendes Institute for Biodiversity Conservation. The park covers parts of the municipalities of Barcelos, Amazonas and Caracaraí, Roraima. It adjoins the Yanomami Indigenous Territory to the north.

The north west of the park has a complex of mountains isolated from other ranges of the Guianas. Altitudes range from 100 to 1,700 metres (330 to 5,580 ft). It contains small meandering streams covered by upland forest, wetlands, rivers with distinctive chemical and biological properties (the Catrimani River and Água Boa do Univini River) and alluvial floodplains. Some of the wetlands are strictly seasonal in nature. Average annual rainfall is 2,000 millimetres (79 in). Temperatures range from 24 to 36 °C (75 to 97 °F) with an average of 28 °C (82 °F).

== Conservation ==
The park is classified as IUCN protected area category II (national park). It has the objectives of preserving natural ecosystems of great ecological relevance and scenic beauty, enabling scientific research, environmental education, outdoors recreation and eco-tourism. The conservation unit is supported by the Amazon Region Protected Areas Program.

== Sources ==
- Full list: PAs supported by ARPA, ARPA
- Parque Nacional Serra da Mocidade (in Portuguese), Chico Mendes Institute for Biodiversity Conservation, archived from the original on 2016-03-03
- "Terra Indígena Yanomami", Terras Indígenas no Brasil (in Portuguese), ISA: Instituto Socioambiental
- Unidade de Conservação: Parque Nacional Serra da Mocidade (in Portuguese), MMA: Ministério do Meio Ambiente
