= Brazil–Guyana border =

International border

- The border between Brazil and Guyana

Characteristics
- Entities: Brazil; Guyana
- Length: 1,605 km (997 mi)

History
- Established: 1904 (Arbitration award); 1926 (Current delimitation)

The Brazil–Guyana border is the international border between the territories of Brazil and Guyana. The terrestrial boundary is 1,605 km (997 mi) long.

== History ==
The marshy terrain and lack of easily exploitable natural resources in this region of South America delayed colonization by the Spanish and Portuguese, which allowed the British and Dutch to create colonies along the coasts and rivers. In 1835, just 4 years after the establishment of British Guiana in 1831, increased interest in the region led Prussian explorer Robert Hermann Schomburgk to explore Guiana's interior. After brief land disputes between Britain and Brazil, Schomburgk claimed the entire area between the mouth of the Barima River and the confluence of the Tacutu River and Ireng River, proclaiming the whole area as British domain.

As a resolution to the series of land disputes known as the Pirara dispute, a treaty was drawn up and signed on November 6, 1901. It was then submitted to the arbitration of King Victor Emmanuel III of Italy who, on June 15, 1904, ruled in favor of Britain and granted them the territory enclosed by the Tacutu and Ireng Rivers.

In 1926, a slight modification gave the boundary the present shape, and boundary markers were placed between 1932 and 1939.

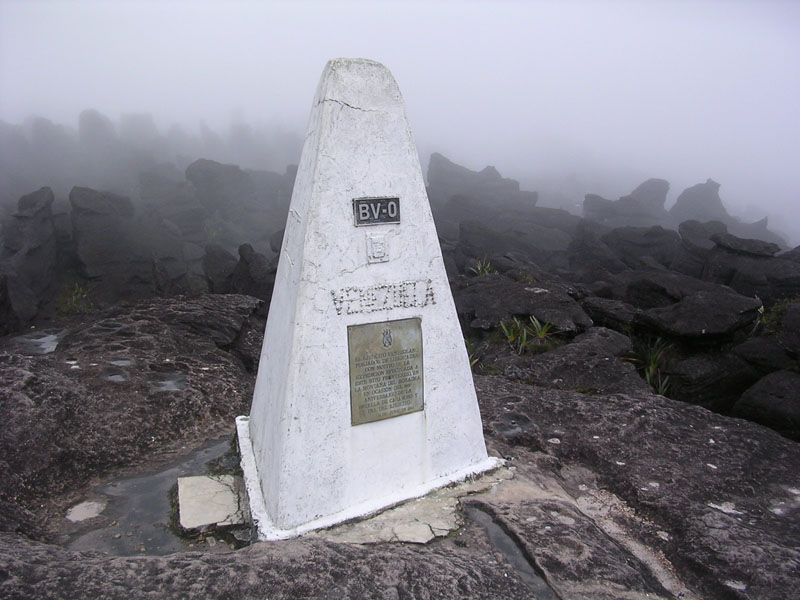
Border marker which marks the triple frontier between Brazil, Venezuela, and Guyana

== Crossings and Infrastructure ==
The primary official crossing is the Takutu River Bridge, which is the only instance in the Americas of a land border where drivers must change from driving on the left (in Guyana) to driving on the right (in Brazil), or vice versa. The changeover is achieved by means of a crossover bridge on the Guyanese side.
