= Furo Santa Rosa =

Coordinates: 3°22′N 61°22′W

Location
- Country: Brazil

Physical characteristics
- Source
  - location: Roraima state

The Furo Santa Rosa is a river of Roraima state in northern Brazil. It is a furo or an anabranch - a diversionary channel - of the Uraricoera River; together they bound the Ilha de Maracá.

== See also ==
- List of rivers of Roraima
