= Serra do Aracá State Park =

State park in Amazonas, Brazil

- Parque Estadual da Serra do Aracá
- IUCN category II (national park)
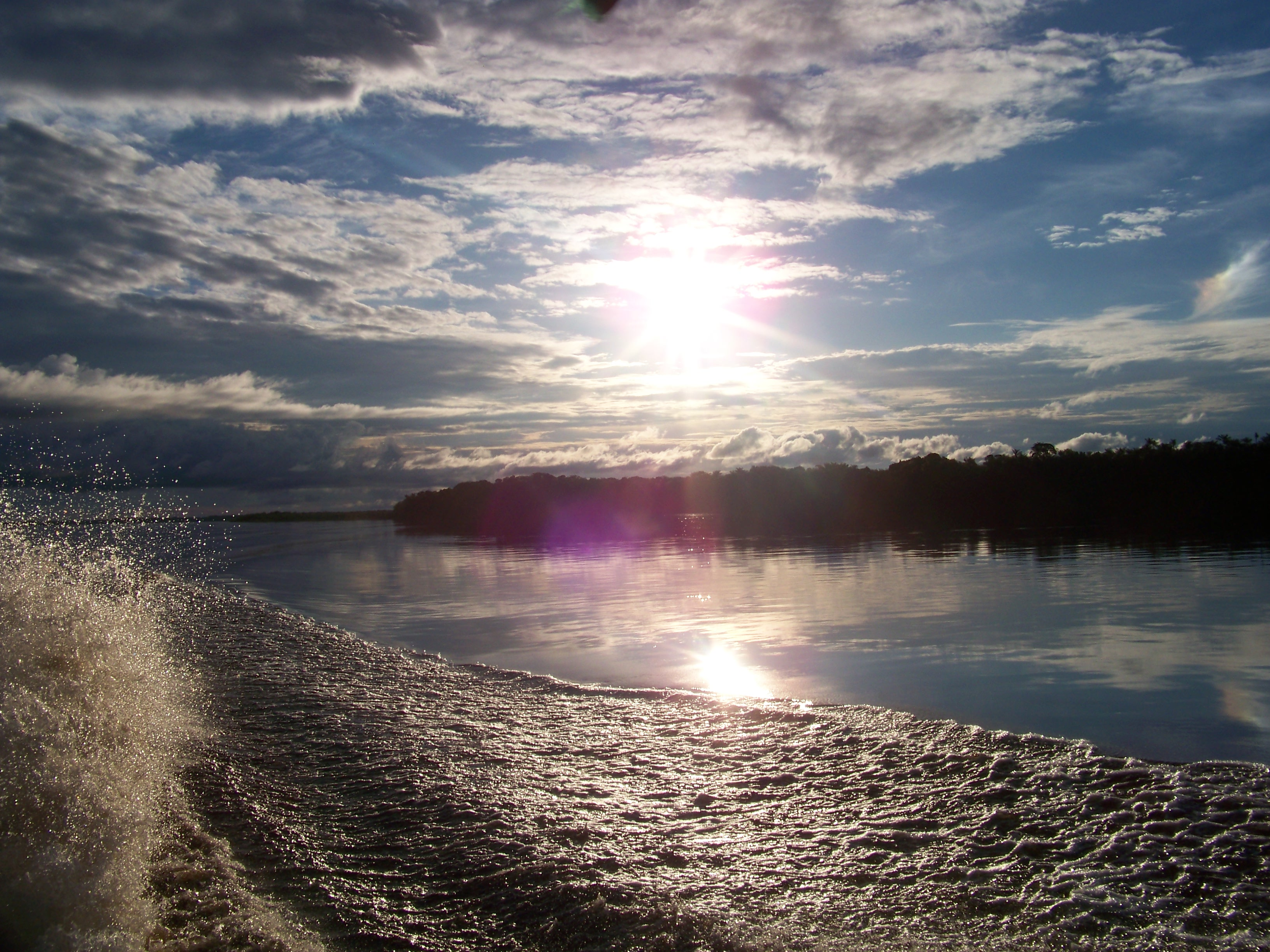
- Sunset in the park

- Location within Brazil
- Nearest city: Barcelos, Amazonas
- Coordinates: 1°33′57″N 63°22′16″W
- Area: 1,818,700 hectares (4,494,000 acres)
- Designation: State park
- Created: 9 March 1990
- Administrator: Centro Estadual de Unidades de Conservação do Amazonas

The Serra do Aracá State Park (Portuguese: Parque Estadual da Serra do Aracá) is a state park in the state of Amazonas, Brazil.

== Location ==
The Serra do Aracá State Park is in the municipality of Barcelos in the state of Amazonas. The base of the Serra do Aracá, a sandstone tepui after which the park is named, is 200 kilometres (120 mi) from the municipal seat on the south (right) shore of the Rio Negro. It can be reached from there by boat along the Cuieiras River. It may also be reached by chartered float plane. From the base to the top of the serra is a 4–5 day journey on foot, or a short helicopter ride.

The park has an area of 1,818,700 hectares (4,494,000 acres). The park overlaps with the Amazonas National Forest, which includes large areas of the park and extends to the west and east of the park. It is also mostly within the Yanomami Indigenous Territory. To the northwest the park is bounded by the border with Venezuela and adjoins the Venezuelan Parima Tapirapecó National Park. To the northeast it is bounded by the border with the state of Roraima.

== Environment ==
The park is in the high forest of the Guianas. It is drained by the Demini River, which rises in the park and flows southwest through the park, then flows south to join the Rio Negro. The terrain along the northwest and southwest borders is mountainous, and there are more isolated elevations in the east. The most notable physical feature is the Serra do Aracá, a tabular plateau formed at the same time as Mount Roraima, which reaches an altitude of 2,000 metres (6,600 ft). The centre of the park is relatively flat.

Vegetation includes montane and submontane rainforest, campinarana and campos rupestres. The fauna is typical of the mountain region, and includes some species new to science. Due to its scenic beauty there is high potential for eco-tourism.

== History ==
The Serra do Aracá State Park was created by decree 12.836 of the Amazonas governor Amazonino Mendes on 9 March 1990. It is administered by the Centro Estadual de Unidades de Conservação do Amazonas (State Centre of Amazonas Conservation Units), part of the Environment secretariat of the state.

The Instituto Socioambiental (ISA) has noted that the Amazonas National Forest, with its goal of sustainable forestry, conflicts with the goals of the Indigenous Territories with which it overlaps. In these territories the indigenous people have the exclusive right of use according to their customs and traditions. The ISA stated in August 2011 that for this reason the Amazonas National Forest should be repealed. On 14 November 2012 an inter-institutional task force was created to consider revised the boundaries of the Serra do Aracá park and the composition of the mosaic of conservation units around it and to consider the disaffection of the Yanomami Indigenous Territory from the Amazonas National Forest.

== Sources ==
- Carlos Alberto Ricardo (22 August 2011), Gestão da FLONA Amazonas (PDF) (in Portuguese), Instituto Socioambiental – ISA, archived from the original (PDF) on 2019-08-06
- PES da Serra do Aracá (in Portuguese), ISA: Instituto Socioambiental
