= Ita River =

Ita River may refer to:

- Itã River, a river in northern Brazil
- Ita River (Russia), a river in Debyossky District of the Udmurt Republic, Russia
