= Apiaú River =

- Location within Brazil
- Native name: Rio Apiaú (Portuguese)

Location
- Country: Brazil

Physical characteristics
- Mouth
  - coordinates: 2.695124°N 61.303500°W

Basin features
- River system: Mucajaí River

The Apiaú River is a river of Roraima state in northern Brazil. It is a tributary of the Mucajaí River.

Part of the river's basin is in the Roraima National Forest.

== See also ==
- List of rivers of Roraima
