= Monte Roraima National Park =

National park in Roraima, Brazil

- Parque Nacional do Monte Roraima
- IUCN category II (national park)
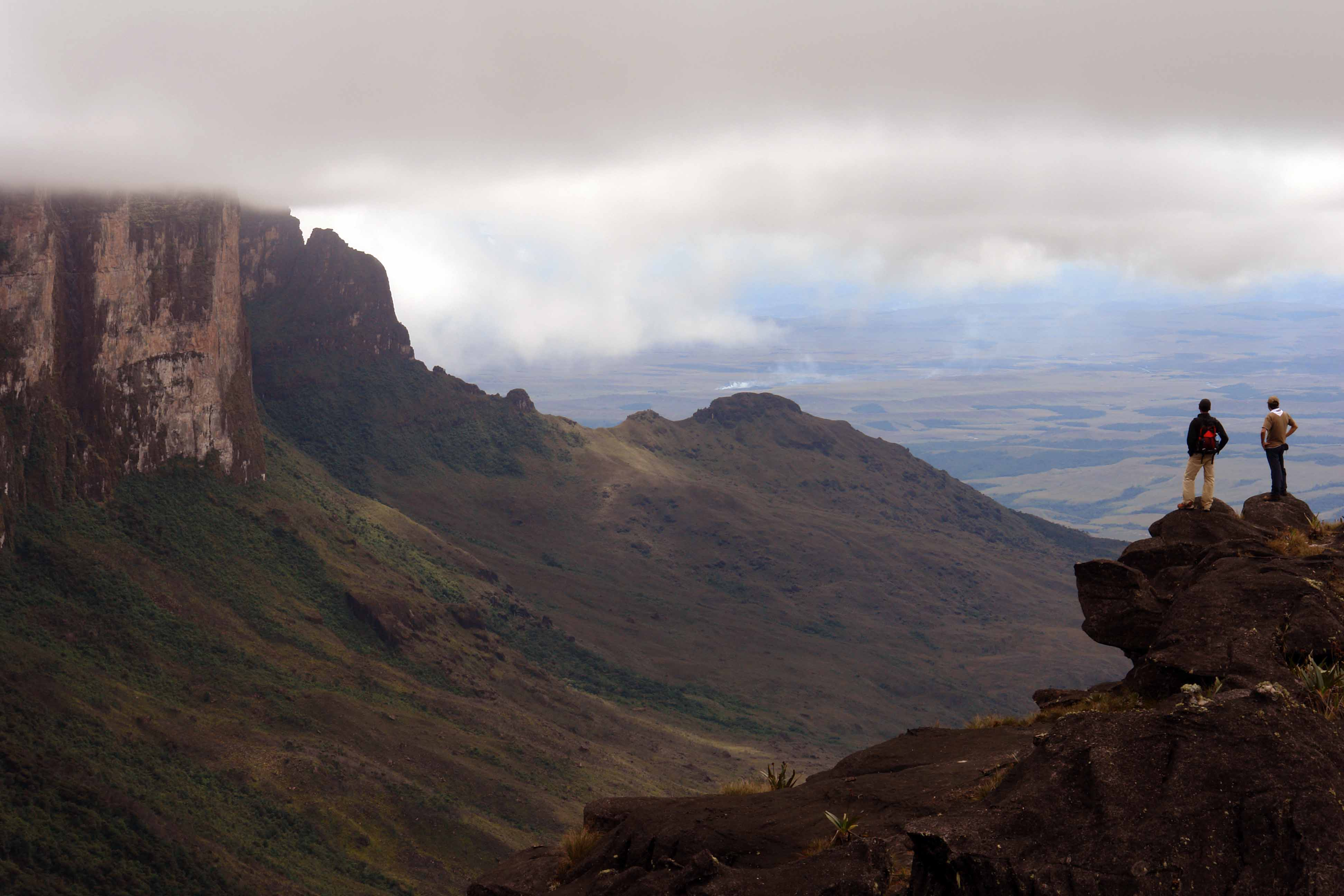
- Skyline from the top of Mount Roraima

- Location within Brazil
- Nearest city: Boa Vista, Roraima
- Coordinates: 5°09′40″N 60°36′50″W
- Area: 116,747.80 hectares (288,490.1 acres)
- Designation: National park
- Created: 28 June 1989
- Administrator: Chico Mendes Institute for Biodiversity Conservation

Monte Roraima National Park (Portuguese: Parque Nacional do Monte Roraima) is a national park in the state of Roraima, northern Brazil.

It includes the Brazilian section of Mount Roraima, and other mountains along the borders with Venezuela and Guyana, and a diverse environment including tropical rainforest and savanna.

The park is fully contained within the Raposa Serra do Sol indigenous territory, and has the dual role of conserving the environment and supporting the constitutional rights of the indigenous people.

== Location ==
Monte Roraima National Park is in the Uiramutã municipality of the state of Roraima. It has an area of 116,747.80 hectares (288,490.1 acres).

The park includes part of the Cotingo River basin, where plans have been made for a hydro-electric plant. The area has high potential for mining, agriculture, ranching and ecotourism, and has resulting tension between the strong Indian population and the ranchers and settlers.

The park includes part of the Pacaraima Mountains, which separate Brazil from Venezuela and Guyana. It is named after Mount Roraima, the highest of the Tepui mountains at almost 3,000 metres (9,800 ft) and one of the highest of the Pacaraima chain. The mountain has a flat top that holds a monument, the Marco da Triplice Fronteira, where the borders of Venezuela, Guyana and Brazil meet.

Altitudes in the park range from 920 to 2,780 metres (3,020 to 9,120 ft) above sea level. The mountains typically have large, flat table tops fringed by steep and partially denuded cliffs, which are surrounded by broad pediments cut with ravines that merge into the lower dissected reliefs of the Pacaraima range. The Serra do Sol range to the southeast has altitudes up to 2,400 metres (7,900 ft).

The park contains the sources of the most northerly rivers that flow south into the Branco River basin. These include the Cotingo River, with its headwaters at the foot of Mount Roraima, the Panari River in the extreme north to the south of the Caburaí mountains, the Maú or Ireng River, which forms the border between Brazil and Guyana, and the Uailan River near the Uailan mountains. The Cotingo and Maú rivers have continuous stretches of rapids and waterfalls, including the dramatic Garã Garã waterfall on the Maú.

== Environment ==
Monte Roraima National Park is in the Amazon biome. Temperatures range from 2 to 18 °C (36 to 64 °F) with an average of 10 °C (50 °F). Average annual rainfall is 1,900 millimetres (75 in). The region has diverse landscapes that should help conserve biodiversity, although it is lacking space. It contains an 9,900 hectares (24,000 acres) area of savanna, 8.7% of the total area. This area includes forest, woodland, park and grassland. The forest includes plateau and montane ecosystems. The first has small patches of dense forest with emergent trees, while the second has dense forest with closed canopy on the slopes, open on the summits and flatter areas. There are various endemic species adapted to the harsh mountain climate where temperatures may range from 4 to 25 °C (39 to 77 °F) in a 24-hour period.

== Administrative history ==
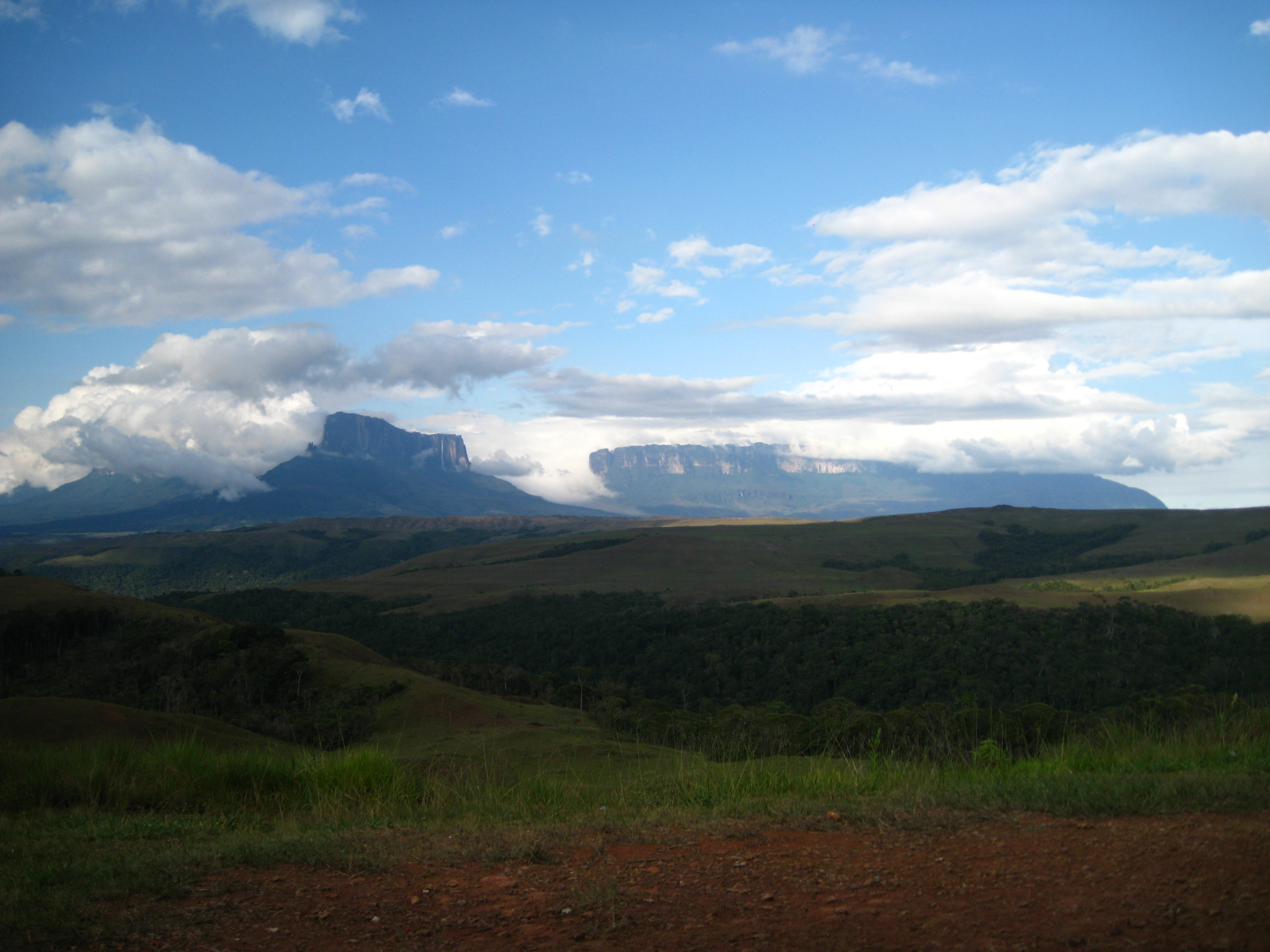
Plateau and mountains

Monte Roraima National Park was created by decree 97.887 of 28 June 1989, and is administered by the Chico Mendes Institute for Biodiversity Conservation (ICMBio). It is classed as IUCN protected area category II (national park). The objectives are preservation of natural ecosystems of great ecological relevance and scenic beauty, and enabling scientific research, environmental education and interpretation, recreation in contact with nature and ecological tourism. As early as 1990 the countries that participate in the Amazonian Cooperation Treaty had recommended expanding Venezuela's Canaima National Park southward to connect it with Monte Roraima National Park, with coordinated management of tourism, research and conservation.

The management plan was finalised in May 2000. Due to lack of money the park still existed only on paper until 2001, when the United Nations provided money to implement and manage parks in Brazil. The indigenous people became concerned when the Brazilian Institute of Environment and Renewable Natural Resources (IBAMA) began to implement the management plan. This included erecting a headquarters building, and potentially removing the indigenous Ingarikó and Macushi people from the park. These people had used the area for many years for hunting, farming and religious practices. The conflict was hard to resolve, since de-gazetting the park would require a major legislative change, as would allowing the indigenous people to use the park.

Due to land disputes and the movement to create the indigenous territory of Raposa Serra do Sol the management plan was not ratified by ICMBio. From 2002 IBAMA technicians worked with the Ingarikó in the area. On 15 April 2005 the area was completely assigned to Fundação Nacional do Índio (FUNAI: National Indian Foundation) through the "dual affectation" legal device created by the federal government with recognition of the Raposa Serra do Sol Indigenous Territory. Under the decree of 15 April 2005 the boundaries of the Raposa Serra do Sol Indigenous Territory were ratified and Monte Roraima National Park was made Union public property with the roles of both maintaining the constitutional rights of the Indians and conserving the environment.

== Sources ==
- Furley, Peter A. (2002-09-11), The Forest Frontier: Settlement and Change in Brazilian Roraima, Routledge, ISBN 978-1-134-95043-0
- Ghai, Yash; Cottrell, Jill (2009-12-16), Marginalized Communities and Access to Justice, Routledge, ISBN 978-1-135-23613-7
- Hillstrom, Kevin; Hillstrom, Laurie Collier (2004), Latin America and the Caribbean: A Continental Overview of Environmental Issues, ABC-CLIO, ISBN 978-1-57607-690-3
- Kanamala, Nikhil (2011-05-03), Roraima, Brazilian Amazon - Case Study, Nikhil Kanamala, GGKEY:8YS3NY6ENK8
- McNeely, Jeffrey A.; Harrison, Jeremy (1994), Protecting Nature: Regional Reviews of Protected Areas, IUCN, ISBN 978-2-8317-0119-6
- Parna do Monte Roraima (in Portuguese), Chico Mendes Institute for Biodiversity Conservation
- Unidade de Conservação: Parque Nacional do Monte Roraima (in Portuguese), MMA: Ministério do Meio Ambiente
- Victor, Italo (2014-09-15), The great Amazonia, Lulu.com, ISBN 978-1-326-01651-7
