= Caroaebe River =

Location
- Country: Brazil

Physical characteristics
- Source
  - location: Roraima state

The Caroaebe River (sometimes incorrectly referred to as the Caroebe River which is further south (Note: "Boa Vista e Roraima" (PDF). Serviço Geológico do Brazil (CPRM), Secretaria de Minas e Metalurgia, Federal Government of Brazil. October 6, 2015.. The bulk of the actual Rio Caroebe is located to the southwest of the map-coordinate at 01°00′N 60°00′W indicated by the map-grid.) (Note: Nicholas P. Tippery; C. Thomas Philbrick; Claudia P. Bove; Donald H. Les (2011). Allan J. Bornstein (ed.). "Systematics and Phylogeny of Neotropical Riverweeds (Podostemaceae: Podostemoideae)". Systematic Botany. 36 (1): 116. doi:10.1600/036364411X553180....Brazil. Roraima: Caroebe River, 00°52′28″N 59°39′50″W, 13 Oct[ober] 2008 (1), Bove et al 1971 (R, WCSU), HM470282-HM470469; ...1972 (R, WCSU), HM470283-HM470470... Literature Cited...Bove 2006)) is a river of Roraima state in northern Brazil, near the equator.

== Geography ==
The headwaters are at approximately 00°55′N 59°45′W between the towns of Caroebe and São João da Baliza, on the northern side of the connecting roadway BR-210. The river flows westward to approximately 01°10′N 60°05′W where it merges with the larger Anauá River, just prior to the Majada waterfall which is to the north of São Luiz.

== Ecology ==
Along the river, biologists have studied species of black flies (Simulium guianense and Simulium litobranchium, see Simulium) which carry a parasite that causes river-blindness.

== See also ==
- List of rivers of Roraima
