= Cotingo River =

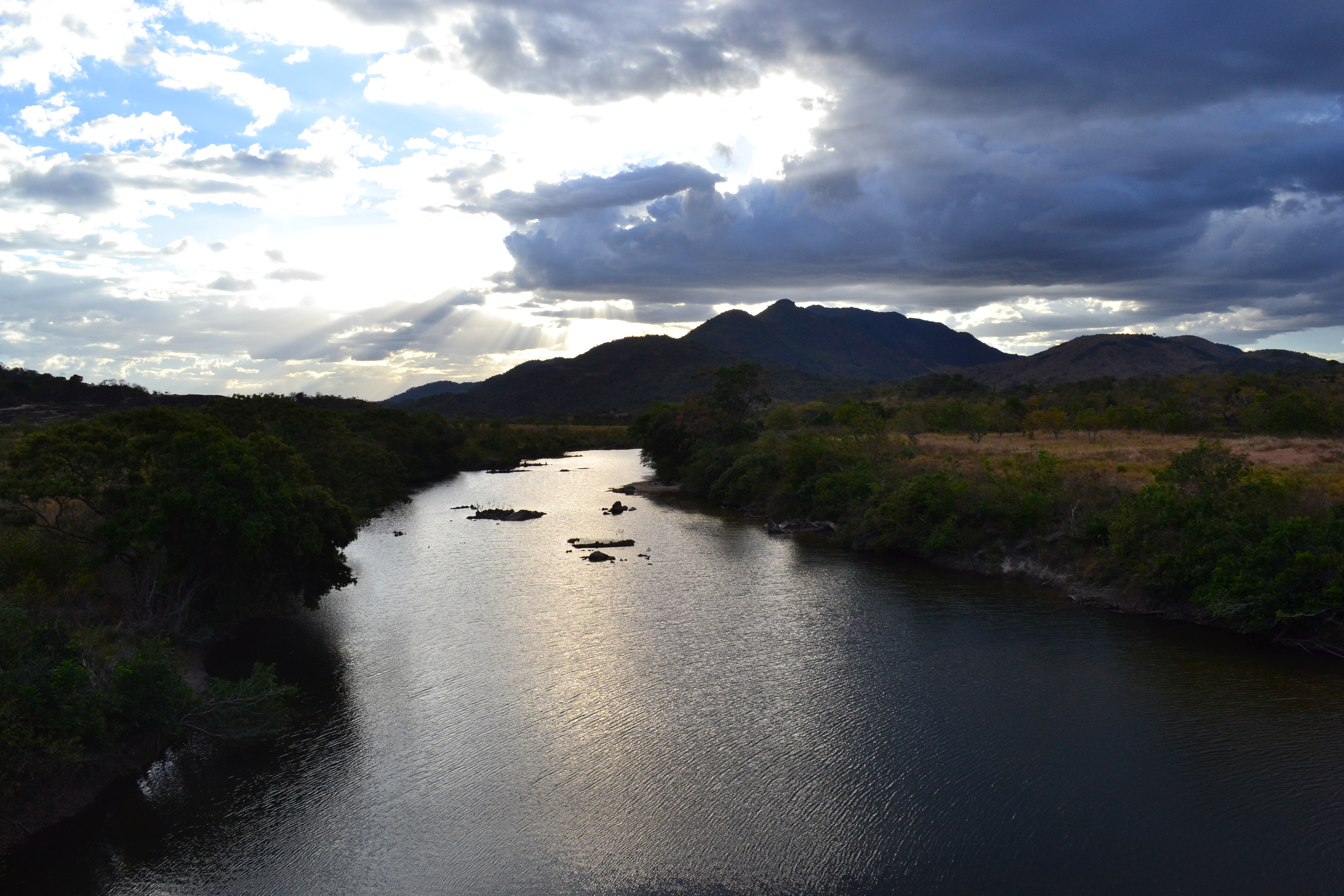
- Cotingo River, São Marcos indigenous reserve

- Location within Brazil
- Native name: Rio Cotingo (Portuguese)

Location
- Country: Brazil

Physical characteristics
- Source
  - location: Roraima state
- Mouth
  - location: Surumu River, Pacaraima, Roraima
  - coordinates: 3.911686°N 60.501107°W

The Cotingo River (Portuguese: Rio Cotingo) is a river of Roraima state in northern Brazil, a tributary of the Surumu River. It flows through the Raposa Serra do Sol indigenous territory. For many years there has been discussion over building a major hydroelectric power project on the river.

== River basin ==
The Cotingo River has its headwaters at the foot of Mount Roraima in the Guayana Highlands region. The upper part of the Cotingo River basin is contained in the 116,748 hectares (288,490 acres) Monte Roraima National Park, a protected area created in 1989 that is fully contained in the Raposa Serra do Sol indigenous territory.

The river runs for about 210 kilometres (130 mi) to its confluence with the Surumu River, of which is the main tributary.

It contains continuous stretches of rapids and waterfalls. The savanna region of the river basin has an equatorial climate with tropical monsoon rainfall.

=== Conservation ===
It is home to the Sun parakeet (Aratinga solstitialis), Rio Branco antbird (Cercomacra carbonaria), Finsch's euphonia (Euphonia finschi), Bearded tachuri (Polystictus pectoralis) and Hoary-throated spinetail (Synallaxis kollari).

The river basin has high potential for mining, agriculture, ranching, and ecotourism, and as a result there is tension between the strong Indian population and the ranchers and settlers.

=== Hydroelectric project ===
Plans have been made for a hydro-electric project on the river. The first studies of the hydroelectric project were made in the 1970s. The proposed hydroelectric project would involve building five dams along the length of the river.

In 2006 the federal senate approved a legislative decree aimed to authorise the work, which would be undertaken in an indigenous area and would affect the Ingarikó, Makuxi, Patamona, Taurepang and Wapixana people.

Nothing had been done by 2011 and the priority in Roraima state had turned to construction of the Bem Querer dam on the Branco River.

The planned dam would have potential capacity of 136 MW and would flood an area of 37 square kilometres (14 sq mi). It would cost US$140 million. The first community to be flooded would be Tamanduá in the Serra region.

Wind power and solar power would be sufficient to meet the Raposa Serra do Sol's energy needs, but the project would be able to deliver power to the whole state. The indigenous people were concerned about the environmental impact and also the influx of non-indigenous people that would be expected.

== See also ==
- List of rivers of Roraima

== Sources ==
- "Cotingo Perfil da usina", Barragens na Amazonia (in Portuguese), archived from the original on 2020-01-13
- Furley, Peter A. (2002-09-11), The Forest Frontier: Settlement and Change in Brazilian Roraima, Routledge, ISBN 978-1-134-95043-0
- Luciano Nascimento (18 April 2013), "Comunidades temem construção de hidrelétrica em Raposa Serra do Sol", Agência Brasil (in Portuguese)
- Luis Cláudio de Jesus Silva; Carlos Vicente Joaquim (2011), "Hidrelétrica no rio Cotingo: quatro décadas na pseudo-agenda política de Roraima", Revista de Administração de Roraima (in Portuguese), 1 (1), ISSN 2237-8057
- "Savanas do Rio Cotingo IBA", Global Species
- Unidade de Conservação: Parque Nacional do Monte Roraima (in Portuguese), MMA: Ministério do Meio Ambiente
- Brazilian Ministry of Transport
