= Novo River (Xeriuini River tributary) =

Location
- Country: Brazil

Physical characteristics
- Source
  - location: Roraima state
- Mouth: Xeriuini River
  - coordinates: 0°8′N 62°4′W

The Novo River is a river of Roraima state in northern Brazil. It is a tributary of the Xeriuini River.

== See also ==
- List of rivers of Roraima
