= Novo River (Anauá River tributary) =

Location
- Country: Brazil

Physical characteristics
- Source
  - location: Roraima state
- Mouth: Anauá River
  - coordinates: 1°17′N 59°47′W

The Novo River is a river of Roraima state in northern Brazil. It is a tributary of the Anauá River.

== See also ==
- List of rivers of Roraima
