= Panari River =

- Location within Brazil
- Native name: Rio Panari (Portuguese)

Location
- Country: Brazil

Physical characteristics
- Source
  - location: Roraima state
- Mouth
  - location: Cotingo River
  - coordinates: 5.088611°N 60.396667°W

Basin features
- River system: Cotingo River

The Panari River is a river of Roraima state in northern Brazil. It is a tributary of the Cotingo River.

The sources of the river are in the 116,748 hectares (288,490 acres) Monte Roraima National Park, created in 1989.

== See also ==
- List of rivers of Roraima
