= Uailan River =

- Location within Brazil

Location
- Country: Brazil

Physical characteristics
- Source
  - location: Roraima state
- Mouth
  - location: Maú or Ireng River
  - coordinates: 4.605547°N 60.123036°W

The Uailan River is a river of Roraima state in northern Brazil. It is a tributary of the Maú or Ireng River.

The sources of the river are in the 116,748 hectares (288,490 acres) Monte Roraima National Park, created in 1989.

== See also ==
- List of rivers of Roraima
