= Auari River =

Coordinates: 3°32′31″N 63°48′13″W

- Location within Brazil

Location
- Country: Brazil

Physical characteristics
- Source
  - location: Roraima state

The Auari River (or Awaris River) is a river of Roraima state in northern Brazil.

== See also ==
- List of rivers of Roraima
