= Arraia River =

Coordinates: 3°25′29″N 59°50′30″W

Location
- Country: Brazil

Physical characteristics
- Source
  - location: Roraima state

The Arraia River is a river of Roraima state in northern Brazil.

== See also ==
- List of rivers of Roraima
