= Macucuaú River =

Coordinates: 0°37′45″S 61°25′32″W

Location
- Country: Brazil

Physical characteristics
- Source
  - location: Roraima state

The Macucuaú River is a river of Roraima state in northern Brazil.

== See also ==
- List of rivers of Roraima
