= Jufari River =

Coordinates: 1°13′S 61°59′W

Location
- Country: Brazil

Physical characteristics
- Source
  - location: Amazonas state

Jufari River is a river forming part of the border between Amazonas and Roraima states in north-western Brazil.

== See also ==
- List of rivers of Amazonas
- List of rivers of Roraima
