= Pacu River (Amajari River tributary) =

Location
- Country: Brazil

Physical characteristics
- Source
  - location: Roraima state
- Mouth: Amajari River
  - coordinates: 3°53′N 61°33′W

The Pacu River is a river of Roraima state in northern Brazil. It is a tributary of the Amajari River.

== See also ==
- List of rivers of Roraima
