= Ireng River =

River in Brazil and Guyana

Coordinates: 3.550°N 59.850°W

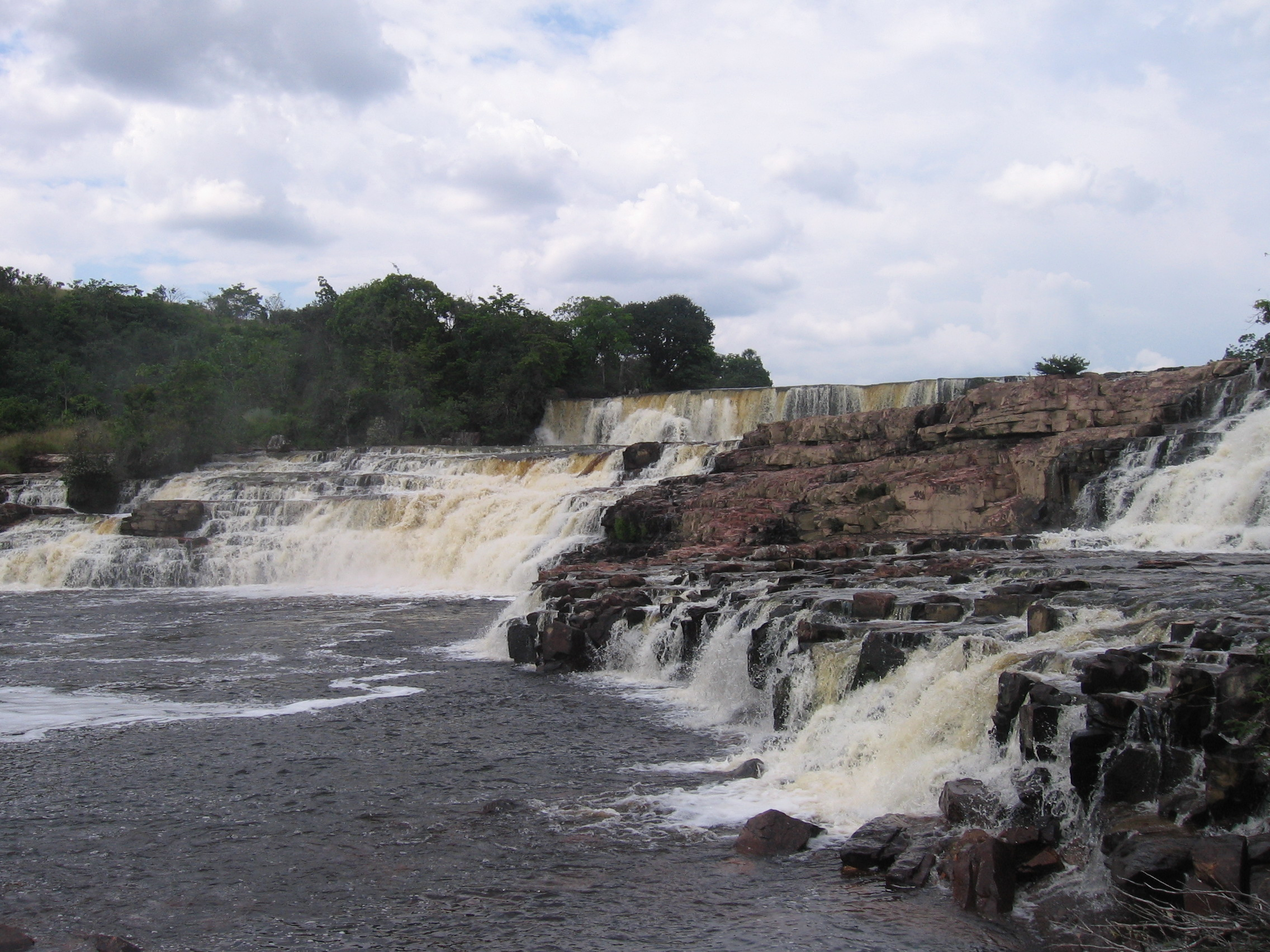
The Orinduik Falls on the Ireng River on the border between Guyana and Brazil

The Ireng River (or Maú River, generally used in Portuguese) forms part of Guyana's western border with Brazil. One of the northernmost tributaries of the Amazon River, it is the only major river in Guyana that flows from north to South. It flows through the valleys of the Pakaraima Mountains.

The sources of the river are in the 116,748 hectares (288,490 acres) Monte Roraima National Park, created in 1989. The larger part of the Ireng River basin forms the frontier between Brazil and Guyana. Ireng's main tributaries are the Uailan and Canã rivers on the Brazilian side and the Cacó, Dacã and Socobi rivers on the Guyanese side. All of these rivers merge with the upper and middle sections of the Ireng. Their courses are through breathtaking formations of sedimentary rocks formed by tectonic movements in ancient times. The Ireng River's waters are dark, bearing a striking resemblance to that of Rio Negro near Manaus, in Brazilian state of Amazonas.

It is considered to be one of the most picturesque of Guyana's many rivers. Orinduik Falls and Takagka Falls are located on the Ireng River.

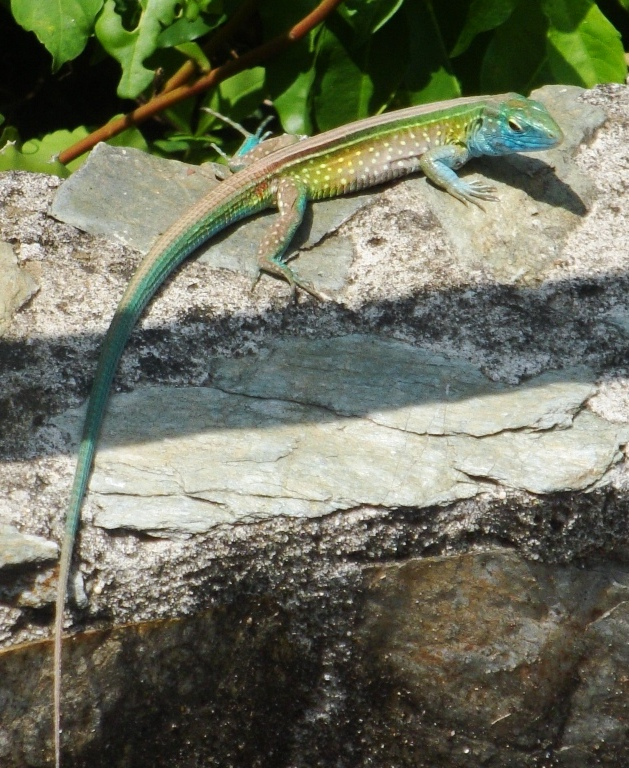
Rainbow whiptail

== Etymology ==
Etymologically, the term ″Ireng″ comes from the Karib language, whereas ″Maú″ comes from the Lokono word Mahu, which is how the plant Sterculia pruriens (a malvaceae abundant in the Amazon) is known to the indigenous people of the region. Another explanation suggests that Mahu comes from Mehru, which means "fall" and Ireng translates to "river", hence "river of the falls".

== Biodiversity in the Ireng ==
The Ireng River region is home to such reptile species as the Antilles leaf-toed gecko (Hemidactylus palaichthus) and rainbow whiptail (Cnemidophorus lemniscatus); amphibians such as the sapo dorado (Bufo guttatus) and Leptodactylus bolivianus; birds including the Muscovy duck (Cairina moschata), black vulture (Coragyps atratus), crested caracara (Caracara plancus), double-striped thick-knee (Burhinus bistriatus) and numerous others; mammals include the South American tapir (Tapirus terrestris), jaguar (Panthera onca) and the red-rumped agouti (Dasyprocta leporina).

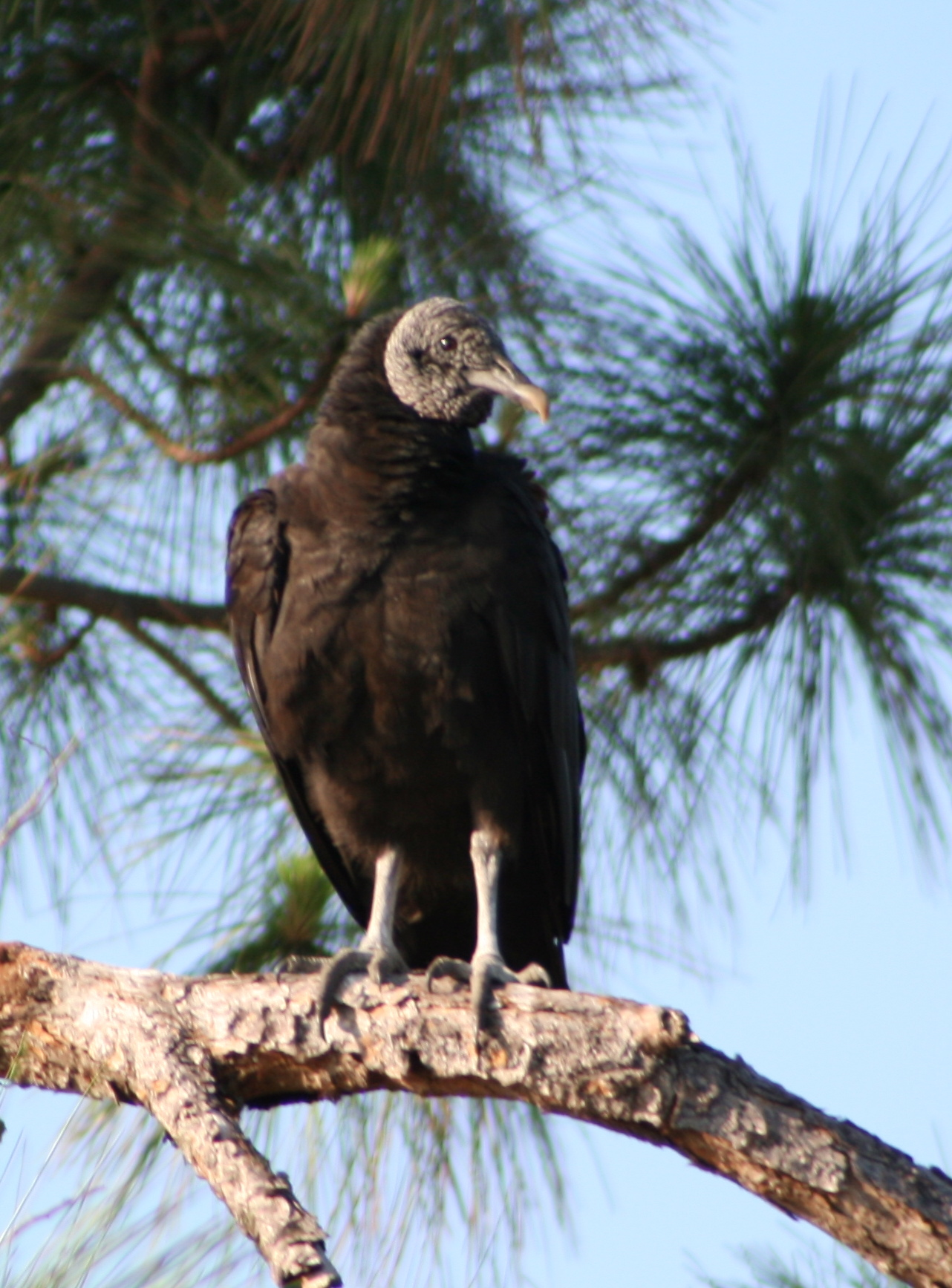
Black vulture

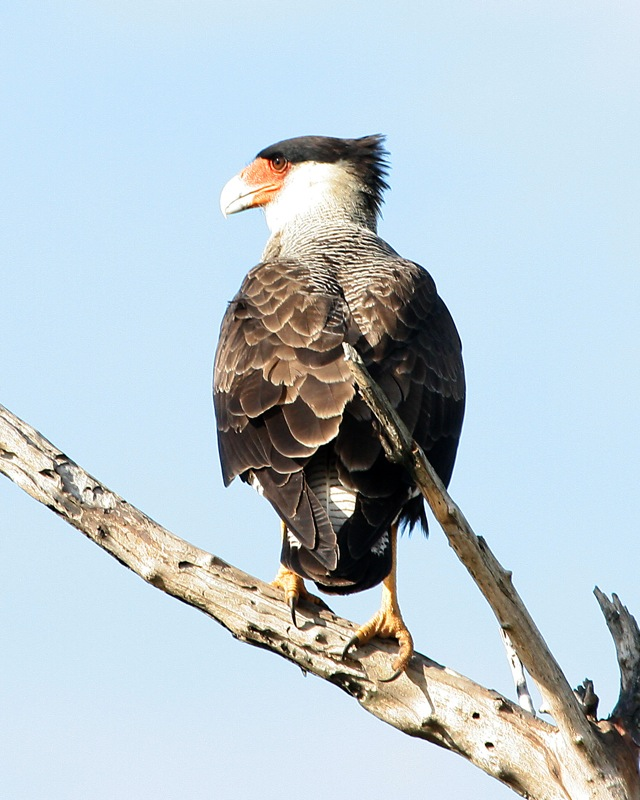
Crested caracara
