= Northern Amazon Ecological Corridor =

- Corredor Norte da Amazônia
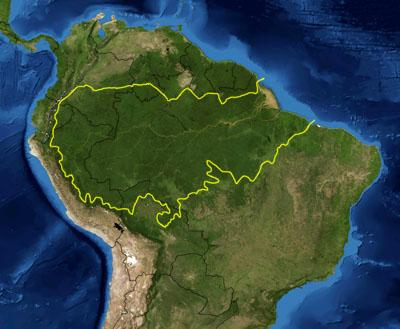
- A map of the Amazon rainforest ecoregions

- Location within Brazil
- Coordinates: 3°24′14″N 61°41′10″W
- Area: 21,000,000 hectares (52,000,000 acres)
- Designation: Ecological corridor

The Northern Amazon Ecological Corridor (Portuguese: Corredor Norte da Amazônia) is a proposed ecological corridor connecting conservation units and indigenous territories in the north of the Amazon rainforest of Brazil.

== Background ==
The first version of the Ecological Corridors of Tropical Forests of Brazil proposal was developed by a group of consultants at the request of the Brazilian Ministry of the Environment and presented in the first half of 1997. Seven major corridors were proposed: the Central Amazon Ecological Corridor, Northern Amazon Ecological Corridor, South Amazon Ecological Corridor, South Amazon Ecotones Ecological Corridor, Western Amazon Ecological Corridor, Central Atlantic Forest Ecological Corridor and Serra do Mar Ecological Corridor. These corresponded to about 25% of the rainforests of Brazil. Priority was given to the Central Amazon Corridor and the Central Atlantic Forest Corridor, which would test and develop the concepts for use with the subsequent corridors.

== Proposed scope ==
The Northern Amazon Ecological Corridor was one of five Amazon region corridors identified. It would cover the northern Amazon border with Colombia and Venezuela. There would be six priority areas in three main Amazon ecoregions. The corridor was identified as being relatively intact, globally important for its biological distinctness, and high priority on a regional scale. The corridor would have an area of 21,000,000 hectares (52,000,000 acres).

Conservation units would include the Amazonas National Forest, Maracá Ecological Station, Pico da Neblina National Park and Roraima National Forest. The proposal also included the Cubaté, Cuiari, Içana, Pari Cachoeira II, Piraiauara, Tarauacá I, Tarauacá II and Uruçu national forests. However, these were among 11 national forests created by President José Sarney on 23 November 1989 and 9 March 1990 that were revoked by his successor President Fernando Collor de Mello on 5 September 1991. The forests had been created without considering the claims of the indigenous people.

== Sources ==
- Arruda, Moacir Bueno; Nogueira de Sá, Luís Fernando S. (2003), Corredores Ecológicos: Uma abordagem integradora de ecossistemas no Brasil (PDF) (in Portuguese), Brasília: IBAMA
- Ayres, José Márcio; Da Fonseca, Gustavo A. B.; Rylands, Anthony B.; Queiroz, Helder L.; Pinto, Luiz Paulo; Masterson, Donald; Cavalcanti, Roberto B. (2005), Os Corredores Ecológicos das Florestas Tropicais do Brasil (PDF) (in Portuguese), Sociedade Civil Mamirauá, archived from the original (PDF) on 2016-07-31
- Corredores Ecológicos na Mata Atlântica (in Portuguese), RBMA: Atlantic Forest Biosphere Reserve
- O Corredor Central Da Mata Atlãntica (PDF) (in Portuguese), MMA: Ministry of the Environment (Brazil), archived from the original (PDF) on 2016-03-03
- Rolla, Alicia; Ricardo, Fany (March 2006), "As Florestas Nacionais e a questão mineral" (PDF), Mineração em Unidades de Conservação na Amazônia brasileira, Instituto Socioambiental, archived from the original (PDF) on 2016-01-14
- Sarney, José (9 March 1990), Decreto no 99.109, de 9 de Março de 1990
