= Cauamé River =

Location
- Country: Brazil

Physical characteristics
- Source
  - location: Roraima state
- Mouth
  - coordinates: 2°51′N 60°38′W

The Cauamé River is a river of Roraima state in northern Brazil.

== See also ==
- List of rivers of Roraima
