= Uauaris River =

Coordinates: 3°30′N 63°49′W

Location
- Country: Brazil

Physical characteristics
- Source
  - location: Roraima state

The Uauaris River is a river which runs within the Roraima state in northern Brazil.

== See also ==
- List of rivers of Roraima
