= Itapará River =

Location
- Country: Brazil

Physical characteristics
- Source
  - location: Roraima state
- Mouth
  - coordinates: 0°26′S 61°48′W

The Itapará River is a river of Roraima state in northern Brazil, and it runs for approximately 200 kilometers before joining the lower Branco River.

== See also ==
- List of rivers of Roraima
