= Pacu River (Catrimani River tributary) =

Location
- Country: Brazil

Physical characteristics
- Source
  - location: Roraima state
- Mouth: Catrimani River
  - coordinates: 1°36′N 62°25′W

The Pacu River is a river of Roraima state in northern Brazil. It is a tributary of the Catrimani River.

== See also ==
- List of rivers of Roraima
