= Maracani River =

Coordinates: 4°17′N 59°44′W

Location
- Country: Brazil

Physical characteristics
- Source
  - location: Roraima state

The Maracani River is a river of Roraima state in northern Brazil.

== See also ==
- List of rivers of Roraima
