= Paricarana River =

Coordinates: 3°59′59″N 60°56′28″W

Location
- Country: Brazil

Physical characteristics
- Source
  - location: Roraima state

The Paricarana River is a river of Roraima state in northern Brazil.

== See also ==
- List of rivers of Roraima
