= Lôbo d'Almada River =

Coordinates: 2°06′41″N 62°33′04″W

Location
- Country: Brazil

Physical characteristics
- Source
  - location: Roraima state

The Lôbo d'Almada River is a river of Roraima state in northern Brazil.

== See also ==
- List of rivers of Roraima
