= Caju River =

Coordinates: 3°33′25″N 59°51′49″W

Location
- Country: Brazil

Physical characteristics
- Source
  - location: Roraima state

The Caju River is a river of Roraima state in northern Brazil.

== See also ==
- List of rivers of Roraima
