= Parima River =

Location
- Country: Brazil

Physical characteristics
- Source
  - location: Roraima state
- Mouth
  - coordinates: 3°34′N 63°47′W

The Parima River is a river of Roraima state in northern Brazil. According to explorer and scientist Charles-Marie de La Condamine, the river received its name because it was once believed to flow into the mythical Lake Parime.

== See also ==
- List of rivers of Roraima
