= Ajarani River =

Coordinates: 1°32′53″N 61°15′04″W

Location
- Country: Brazil

Physical characteristics
- Source
  - location: Roraima state

The Ajarani River is a river of Roraima state in northern Brazil.

== See also ==
- List of rivers of Roraima
