= Brinquinho =

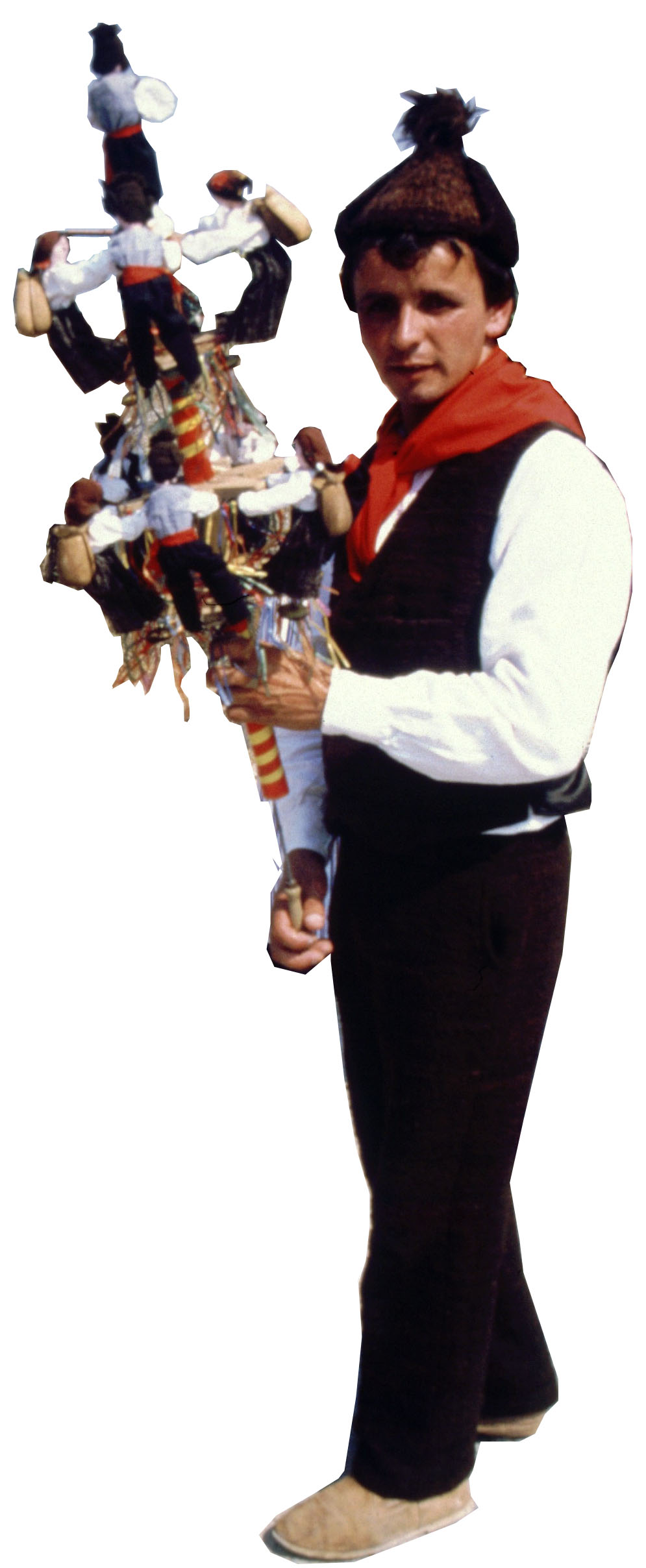
The brinquinho

The brinquinho is a percussion instrument from Madeira, Portugal. It is used in folklore dances, including the Bailinho da Madeira.

The brinquinho consists of a pole made from the Arundo donax cane that holds circular sets of small dolls, each dressed in traditional clothes and holding a castanet. Traditionally, the instrument includes two doll sets - the bottom set with six dolls and the upper set with four - and there may be one or two additional dolls at the top of the pole. The dolls are tied to a wire that passes through the pole, making the dolls move and click the castanets when the wire is pulled from the bottom. The brinquinho may include pairs of crown corks held with nails, making sounds when the brinquinho is moved vertically.

The instrument may have its origins in the 19th century, likely in relation to a similar instrument from Minho called zuca-truca. The earliest known depiction of the brinquinho dates back to a 1923 painting by Henrique Franco.
