= Branquinho River =

Coordinates: 0.06694°S 61.02055°W

Location
- Country: Brazil

Physical characteristics
- Source
  - location: Roraima state

The Branquinho River is a river of Roraima state in northern Brazil.

== See also ==
- List of rivers of Roraima
