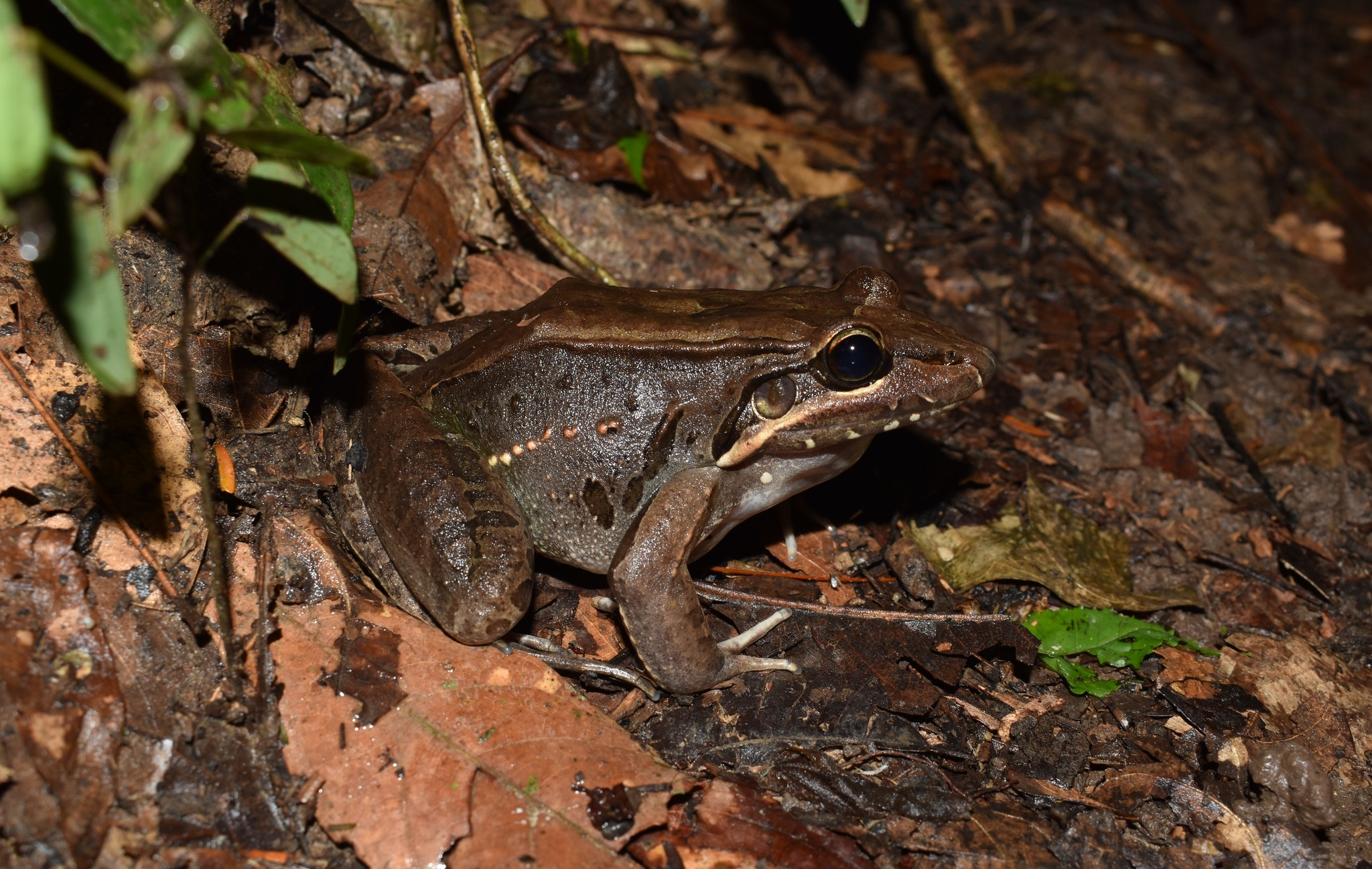
- In Acre, Brazil

Conservation status
- Least Concern (IUCN 3.1)

Scientific classification
- Kingdom: Animalia
- Phylum: Chordata
- Class: Amphibia
- Order: Anura
- Family: Leptodactylidae
- Genus: Leptodactylus
- Species: L. bolivianus

Binomial name
- Leptodactylus bolivianus Boulenger, 1898

Synonyms
- Rana ocellata Linnaeus, 1758; Cystignathus ocellatus Wagler, 1830; Leptodactylus ocellatus Girard, 1853; Gnathophysa ocellata Cope, 1866; Leptognathus ocellatus Boulenger, 1882; Leptodactylus bolivianus Boulenger, 1898; Leptodactylus (Pachypus) bolivianus Lutz, 1930; Leptodactylus (Pachypus) ocellatus Lutz, 1930; Leptodactylus romani Melin, 1941; Leptodactylos ocellatus ocellatus Cei, 1950

= Leptodactylus bolivianus =

Species of frog

Leptodactylus bolivianus is a species of frog in the family Leptodactylidae. Its local name is sapo-rana boliviano ("Bolivian toad-frog"). It is found in the western to central regions of the Amazon basin, in Bolivia, Brazil, Colombia, Peru, and Venezuela. L. insularum and L. guianensis were once thought to be the same species as L. bolivianus.

== Description ==
The adult male frog measures 79.0-121.5 mm in snout-vent length and the adult female 61.2–107.7 mm. The skin of the dorsum is light brown in color with darker brown spots and bars on the legs. There is lighter color above the mouth. The belly is also lighter in color.

== Habitat ==
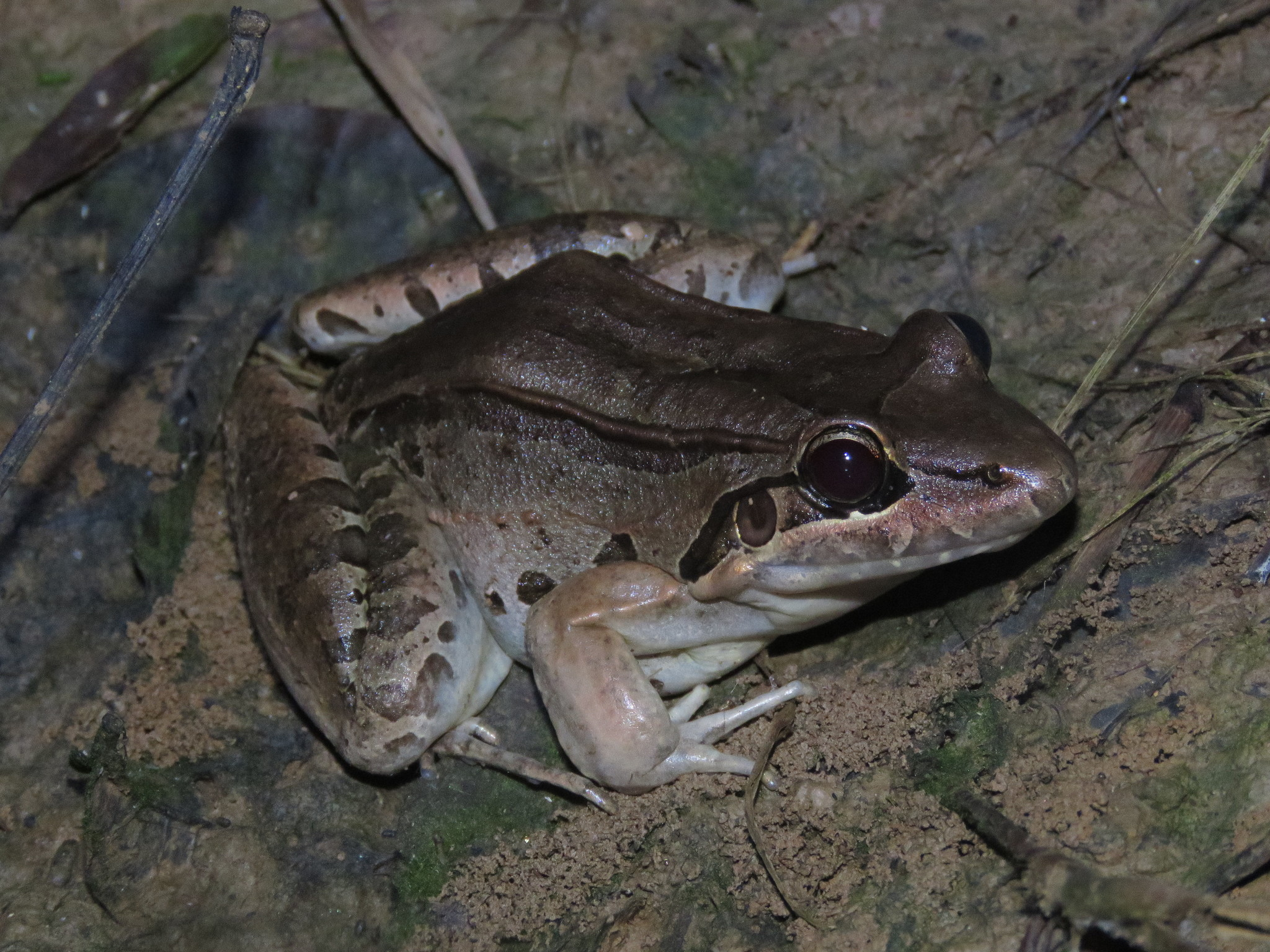
In Bolivia

Its natural habitats are subtropical or tropical dry forests, subtropical or tropical moist lowland forests, subtropical or tropical seasonally wet or flooded lowland grassland, rivers, intermittent rivers, shrub-dominated wetlands, swamps, freshwater marshes, intermittent freshwater marshes, arable land, pastureland, plantations, rural gardens, urban areas, heavily degraded former forest, ponds, aquaculture ponds, sewage treatment areas, irrigated land, seasonally flooded agricultural land, and canals and ditches. Scientists have reported the frog in many protected areas and as high above sea level as 1400.

== Diet ==
This frog eats invertebrates such as orthopterans, beetles and ants. It can also eat smaller frogs.

== Reproduction ==
This frog lays eggs in a foam nest. It hides among vegetation. The tadpoles swim in shallow ponds with muddy bottoms.

== Threats ==
This species is not considered threatened by the IUCN.
