= Parima Tapirapecó National Park =

State-protected area in Venezuela

- IUCN category II (national park)
- Location within Venezuela
- Location: Amazonas, Venezuela
- Nearest city: La Esmeralda
- Coordinates: 2°29′40.49″N 64°39′16.92″W
- Area: 38,290 km^{2} (14,780 sq mi)
- Established: 1 August 1991
- Governing body: INPARQUES

Parima Tapirapecó National Park (Parque Nacional Parima Tapirapecó) is a Venezuelan national park in the southern state of Amazonas.

== Location ==
The Parima Tapirapecó National Park is in the Atabapo and Río Negro municipalities. It is the 5th largest national park in the world and the 2nd largest in South America. Established in August 1991, it has an area of 38,290 km^{2} (15,000 sq mi), and is the largest national park in Venezuela. The area protects the headwaters of the Orinoco, likewise the natural space and culture of the Yanomami ethnic group.

== Environment ==
The park is in the Guayanan Highlands moist forests ecoregion. "The main types of vegetation in Parima-Tapirapecó National Park are evergreen lowland forests and submontane and montane forests. There are also large areas of mostly secondary savannas in the southern Parima uplands."

== See also ==
- List of national parks of Venezuela
- Serra do Aracá State Park
