= Branco River =

River in Roraima, Brazil

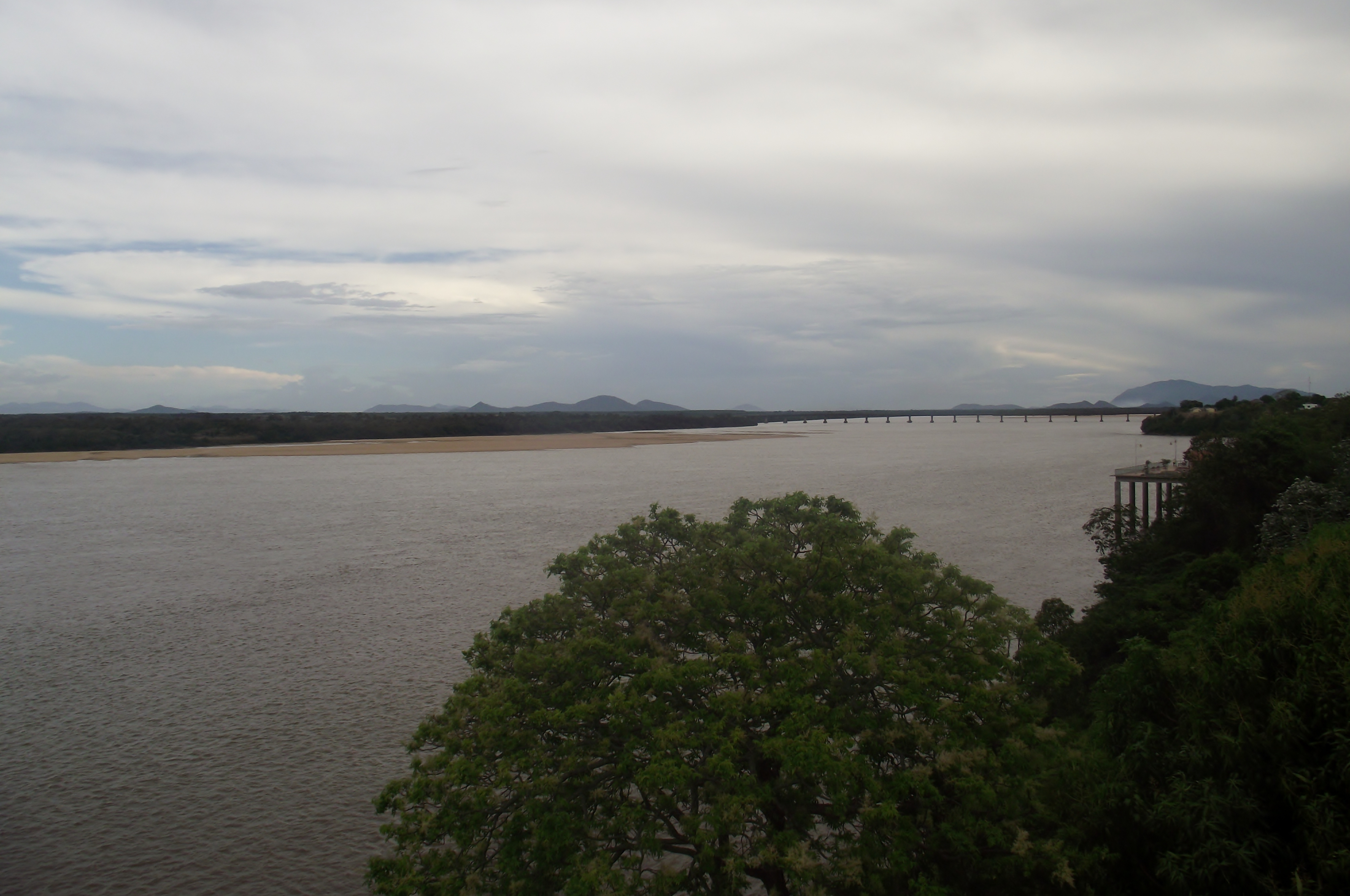
- Branco River in Boa Vista city, Roraima state, Brazil. The Macuxi Bridge, 1.2 km (0.75 mi) long, can be seen in the background.

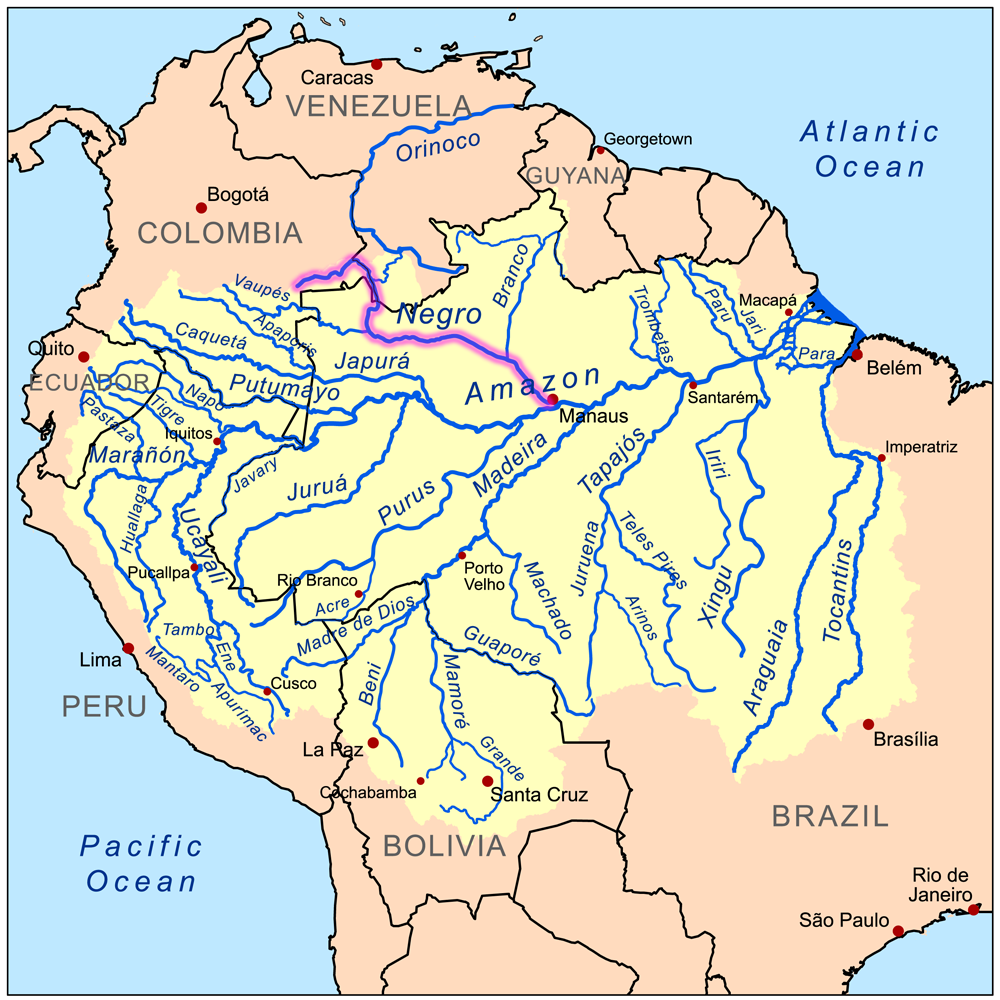
- The Branco River is a tributary of the Rio Negro (highlighted on map)
- Native name: Rio Branco (Portuguese)

Location
- Country: Brazil

Physical characteristics
- Source
  - location: confluence of Takutu and Uraricoera, Bonfim/Boa Vista, Roraima, Brazil
  - coordinates: 3°1′28.5276″N 60°29′14.8596″W
  - elevation: 64 m (210 ft)
- 2nd source
  - location: Uraricoera, Parima Mountains
  - coordinates: 3°41′42.2484″N 64°12′36.018″W
  - elevation: 1,240 m (4,070 ft)
- 3rd source
  - location: Takutu, Guiana Shield
  - coordinates: 1°47′48.6492″N 60°1′38.2656″W
  - elevation: 306 m (1,004 ft)
- Mouth
  - location: Rio Negro, Roraima, Brazil
  - coordinates: 1°23′38″S 61°50′46″W
  - elevation: 12 m (39 ft)
- Length: 560 km (350 mi) to 775 km (482 mi)
- Basin size: 192,392.66 km^{2} (74,283.22 mi^{2})
- Discharge
  - location: Confluence of Rio Negro, Roraima
  - average: (Period:1967–2010)5,400 m^{3}/s (190,000 cu ft/s) (Period: 1980–2006)5,300 m^{3}/s (190,000 cu ft/s) (Period: 1998–2022)6,469 m^{3}/s (228,500 cu ft/s)
  - minimum: 278 m^{3}/s (9,800 cu ft/s)
  - maximum: 28,697 m^{3}/s (1,013,400 cu ft/s)
- Discharge
  - location: Caracaraí (400 km upstream of mouth; Basin size: 124,980 km^{2} (48,260 sq mi)
  - average: (Period: 1997/01/01-2015/12/31) 3,170.343 m^{3}/s (111,959.6 cu ft/s) (Period: 1998–2022)3,615.65 m^{3}/s (127,685 cu ft/s)
  - minimum: 178 m^{3}/s (6,300 cu ft/s) (1998/03/24)
  - maximum: 15,735 m^{3}/s (555,700 cu ft/s) (1976/07/10)
- Discharge
  - location: Boa Vista (Basin size: 97,200 km^{2} (37,500 sq mi)
  - average: (Period: 1967–2010)2,436.76 m^{3}/s (86,053 cu ft/s) (Period: 1998–2022)3,129.97 m^{3}/s (110,534 cu ft/s)

Basin features
- Tributaries
  - left: Takutu, Anauá, Itapará
  - right: Uraricoera, Mucajai, Ajarani, Univini, Catrimani, Xeruini

The Branco River (Portuguese: Rio Branco; Engl: White River) is the principal affluent of the Rio Negro from the north.

== Basin ==
The river drains the Guayanan Highlands moist forests ecoregion. It is enriched by many streams from the Tepui highlands which separate Venezuela and Guyana from Brazil. Its two upper main tributaries are the Uraricoera and the Takutu. The latter almost links its sources with those of the Essequibo; during floods headwaters of the Branco and those of the Essequibo are connected, allowing a level of exchange in the aquatic fauna (such as fish) between the two systems.

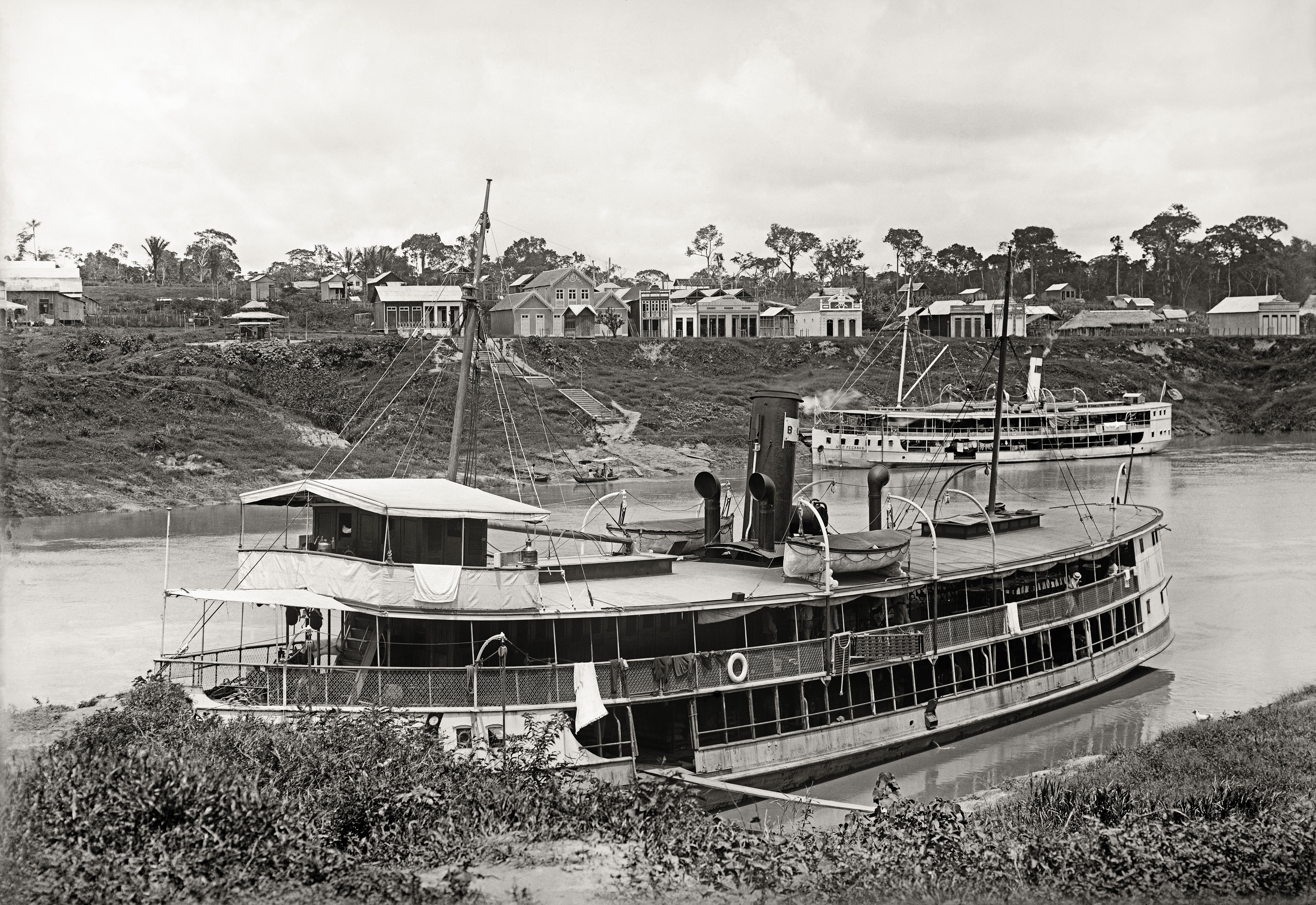
Gaiola Anacorda, Branco River, Acre River, 1912

The Branco flows nearly south, and finds its way into the Negro through several channels and a chain of lagoons similar to those of the latter river. It is 350 miles (560 km) long, up to its Uraricoera confluence. It has numerous islands, and, 235 miles (378 km) above its mouth, it is broken by a bad series of rapids.

== Discharge ==
Average, minimum and maximum discharge of the Branco River at near mouth. Period from 1998 to 2022.

Year	Discharge (m^{3}/s)			Year	Discharge (m^{3}/s)		
Year	Min	Mean	Max	Year	Min	Mean	Max
1998		5,664	16,435	2011	454	5,008	16,815
1999	1,792	9,538	22,576	2012	2,135	8,381	17,944
2000	2,506	9,725	28,697	2013	1,377	6,493	13,229
2001	788	6,551	17,791	2014	1,117	6,384	15,489
2002	1,271	5,219	18,760	2015	772	3,983	10,416
2003	640	4,375	13,320	2016	435	4,316	11,677
2004	756	4,244	11,959	2017	2,258	7,437	16,449
2005	729	7,868	19,893	2018	777	6,653	17,912
2006	2,457	9,899	22,644	2019	625	5,205	15,859
2007	845	7,271	15,118	2020	1,567	7,216	16,564
2008	2,739	7,630	17,280	2021	1,712	8,828	23,180
2009	486	4,318	10,735	2022	1,810	9,087	23,631
2010	278	2,754	8,040		278	6,469	28,697

== Water chemistry ==
As suggested by its name, the Branco (literally "white" in Portuguese) has whitish water that may appear almost milky due to the inorganic sediments it carries. It is traditionally considered a whitewater river, although the major seasonal fluctuations in its physico-chemical characteristics makes a classification difficult and some consider it clearwater. Especially the river's upper parts at the headwaters are clear and flow through rocky country, leading to the suggestion that sediments mainly originate from the lower parts. Furthermore, its chemistry and color may contradict each other compared to the traditional Amazonian river classifications. The Branco River has pH 6–7 and low levels of dissolved organic carbon.

Alfred Russel Wallace mentioned the coloration in "On the Rio Negro", a paper read at the 13 June 1853 meeting of the Royal Geographical Society, in which he said: "[The Rio Branco] is white to a remarkable degree, its waters being actually milky in appearance". Alexander von Humboldt attributed the color to the presence of silicates in the water, principally mica and talc. There is a visible contrast with the waters of the Rio Negro at the confluence of the two rivers. The Rio Negro is a blackwater river with dark tea-colored acidic water (pH 3.5–4.5) that contains high levels of dissolved organic carbon.

== River capture ==
Until approximately 20,000 years ago the headwaters of the Branco River flowed not into the Amazon, but via the Takutu Graben in the Rupununi area of Guyana towards the Caribbean. Currently in the rainy season much of the Rupununi area floods, with water draining both to the Amazon (via the Branco River) and the Essequibo River.

== Citations ==
=== References ===
- Encyclopædia Britannica Online.com: "Branco River" . retrieved 19 September 2009.
