= Sapara =

Sapara may refer to:

- Sapara Monastery, Georgia
- Sapara people, an ethnic group of Ecuador and Peru
- Sápara language, a language of Ecuador and Peru
- Sapará language, a language of Brazil

== People with the name ==
- Adé Sapara, English actor
- Marek Sapara, Slovak sportsman in Turkey
- Oguntola Sapara, Yoruban doctor

== See also ==
- Sappara
