= Maracá Ecological Station =

Nature reserve in Brazil

- Estação Ecológica de Maracá
- IUCN category Ia (strict nature reserve)
- Location within Brazil
- Nearest city: Boa Vista, Roraima
- Coordinates: 3°24′18″N 61°41′10″W
- Area: 103,976 hectares (256,930 acres)
- Designation: Ecological station
- Created: 2 June 1981

Maracá Ecological Station (Portuguese: Estação Ecológica de Maracá) is an ecological station in Boa Vista, Roraima, Brazil. It consists of a large island in the Uraricoera River that is covered by Amazon rainforest.

== History ==
The Maracá Ecological Station was established by presidential decree on 2 June 1981. The station consists of the island of Maracá between the Santa Rosa and Maracá branches of the Uraricoera River in the municipality of Boa Vista, Roraima, with an area of 101,312 hectares (250,350 acres). The Maracá Ecological Station now covers 103,976 hectares (256,930 acres). It was established with the purpose of preserving a representative sample of the Amazon ecosystem. A grid of trails was designed by the Roraima regional center of PPBio, and completed in March 2006.

== Status ==
As of 2009 the Ecological Station was a "strict nature reserve" under IUCN protected area category Ia, with a terrestrial area of 101,312 hectares (250,350 acres). It is administered by the Chico Mendes Institute for Biodiversity Conservation. The conservation unit is supported by the Amazon Region Protected Areas Program. It would be included in the proposed Northern Amazon Ecological Corridor. The White-bellied spider monkey (Ateles belzebuth) is a protected species in the reserve.

== Sources ==
- Ayres, José Márcio; Da Fonseca, Gustavo A. B.; Rylands, Anthony B.; Queiroz, Helder L.; Pinto, Luiz Paulo; Masterson, Donald; Cavalcanti, Roberto B. (2005), Os Corredores Ecológicos das Florestas Tropicais do Brasil (PDF) (in Portuguese), Sociedade Civil Mamirauá, archived from the original (PDF) on 2016-07-31
- Estação Ecológica de Maracá (in Portuguese), Chico Mendes Institute for Biodiversity Conservation, archived from the original on 2016-03-03
- Full list: PAs supported by ARPA, ARPA
- Presidência da República (2 June 1981), DECRETO Nº 86.061, DE 2 DE JUNHO DE 1981. Cria Estações Ecológicas, e dá outras providências.
- Reinaldo Imbrozio Barbosa (2006), ESEC Maracá (in Portuguese), Instituto Nacional de Pesquisas da Amazônia - Roraima
- Triana, Elisa (29 May 2009), "Strict Nature Reserves in Brazil", The Encyclopedia of Earth
