= Canã River =

Location
- Country: Brazil

Physical characteristics
- Source
  - location: Roraima state
- Mouth
  - coordinates: 4°46′N 60°2′W

The Canã River is a river of the Roraima state in northern Brazil.

== See also ==
- List of rivers of Roraima
