= Mucajaí River =

- Location within Brazil
- Native name: Rio Mucajaí (Portuguese)

Location
- Country: Brazil

Physical characteristics
- Mouth
  - coordinates: 2.432526°N 60.843138°W

Basin features
- River system: Branco River

The Mucajaí River is a river of Roraima state in northern Brazil. It is a right tributary of the Branco River.

Part of the river's basin is in the Roraima National Forest.

== See also ==
- List of rivers of Roraima
