= Yanomami Indigenous Territory =

Indigenous territory in Amazonas and Roraima, Brazil

- Terra Indígena Yanomami
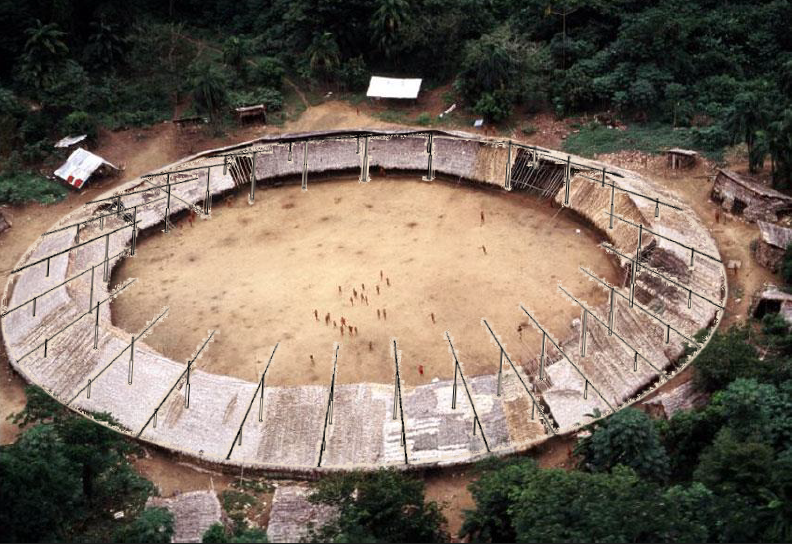
- Yanomami Shabono

- Location within Brazil
- Coordinates: 1°55′07″N 62°59′53″W
- Area: 9,664,975 ha (37,316.68 sq mi)
- Designation: Indigenous territory
- Created: 25 May 1992
- Administrator: FUNAI

The Yanomami Indigenous Territory (Portuguese: Terra Indígena Yanomami) is an indigenous territory in the states of Amazonas and Roraima, Brazil. It overlaps with several federal or state conservation units. It is home to Yanomami and Ye'kuana people. There are ongoing conflicts with an overlapping national forest in which mining was permitted.

== Location ==
The Yanomami Indigenous Territory has an area of 9,664,975 hectares (23,882,670 acres) in the states of Amazonas and Roraima, making it the largest indigenous territory in Brazil in terms of area. The territory is bounded by the frontier with Venezuela to the northwest. In the west it adjoins the Balaio and Cué-cué/Marabitanas indigenous territories. 50% of the Pico da Neblina National Park overlaps the western part of the territory. Most of the Amazonas National Forest is within the territory, as is most of the Serra do Aracá State Park. In the southeast it adjoins the Serra da Mocidade National Park and the Caracaraí Ecological Station. In the east it adjoins the Roraima National Forest.

== People ==
The Yanomami Indigenous Territory is home to Yanomami people speaking the Ninam, Sanumá, Yanomamö and Yanomami languages of the Yanomamam linguistic family, and to Ye'kuana people speaking the Ye'kuana language of the Carib linguistic family. The population as of 1989 was 9,910 according to FUNAI. This has risen steadily to an estimated 23,512 people as of 2016 according to Sesai.

The state is represented in the territory of the Fundação Nacional do Índio (Funai). Registered indigenous organizations include the Associação das Mulheres Yanomami (Kumirayoma), Associação de Pais e Mestres Comunitários (APMC), Associação do Povo Ye'Kuana do Brasil (APYB), Associação Texoli, Associação Yanomami do Rio Cauaburis e Afluentes (AYRCA/FOIRN), Associação Yanomami do Rio Marauiá e do Rio Preto (KURIKAMA), Círculo de Pais e Mestres Escola Estadual (Indígena) Apolinário Gimenes (CIPAMESAG), Federação das Organizações Indígenas do Rio Negro (FOIRN), Hutukara Associação Yanomami (HAY) and the Organização dos Povos Indígenas de Roraima (OPIR).

== History ==
The Yanomami Indigenous Territory was created through a series of steps that began with ordinance 1.817 of 8 January 1985 and led to the first homologation on 16 February 1989. The Roraima National Forest was created by decree nº 97545 of 1 March 1989 and covered 2,664,685 hectares (6,584,580 acres) of the Amazon biome. This had the effect of dividing the territory of the Yanomami people into several separate areas. In 1990 three gold mining reserves were created within the Roraima National Forest. The Yanomami Indigenous Territory was demarcated in 1992 in the lead up to the Earth Summit in Rio de Janeiro. The indigenous territory was created on 25 May 1992 with an area of 9,664,975 hectares (23,882,670 acres), and it was thought that this territory completely covered the national forest area. This was followed by a vigorous international campaign in support of the Yanomami people. The gold mines were closed and the miners removed.

In an indigenous territory the indigenous people have the exclusive right of use according to their customs and traditions. Although technically the Roraima National Forest remained, exploitation of the forest would violate these rights. In 2001 IBAMA realized that 5% of the forest, or 142,000 hectares (350,000 acres), had been left out of the indigenous territory, and decided to repossess the unit. However, in the mid-1990s two settlements, Samaúma and Vila Nova, had taken 50,000 hectares (120,000 acres), leaving 92,000 hectares (230,000 acres) unclaimed. To regularize the situation, the boundaries were revised by law 12058 of 13 October 2009. The resized national forest now excludes the indigenous territory. There were various other adjustment with the most recent being homologation process 954 of 19 July 2012.

Threats include illegal mining, fishing, hunting and farming. As of 2000 a total of 10,288 hectares (25,420 acres) had been deforested. This had risen to 24,571 hectares (60,720 acres) by 2014.

== Sources ==
- Características da UC (in Portuguese), ICMBio
- Carlos Alberto Ricardo (22 August 2011), Gestão da FLONA Amazonas (PDF) (in Portuguese), Instituto Socioambiental – ISA, archived from the original (PDF) on 2019-08-06
- Floresta Nacional de Roraima (in Portuguese), Chico Mendes Institute for Biodiversity Conservation, archived from the original on 2017-07-13
- PARNA do Pico da Neblina (in Portuguese), ISA: Instituto Socioambiental
- "Terra Indígena Yanomami", Terras Indígenas no Brasil (in Portuguese), ISA: Instituto Socioambiental
