= Surumu River =

Coordinates: 3°22′25″N 60°19′18″W

Location
- Country: Brazil

Physical characteristics
- Source
  - location: Roraima state

The Surumu River is a river of Roraima state in northern Brazil.

== See also ==
- List of rivers of Roraima
