= Parima Mountains =

Mountain range in South America

Coordinates: 3.5000°N 64.2500°W

The Parima Mountains (Spanish: Sierra Parima, Portuguese: Serra Parima) are a mountain range of the Guiana Shield in South America.

The Parima Mountains are located in the western part of the Guiana Shield, where they run for approximately 320 kilometres (200 mi) in a north–south direction in the border area of Brazil and Venezuela. They reach a maximum elevation of 1,500 metres (4,900 ft) and form the divide between the watersheds of the Amazon and the Orinoco. All the water on their western side drains into the Orinoco, which rises itself in the Parima Mountains as well. All the water on their eastern side drains into the Branco River, which ultimately empties into the Rio Negro, which in turn empties into the Amazon.

The Parima Mountains belong to the settlement areas of the Yanomami.

== See also ==
- Parima Tapirapecó National Park
