= Branquinha =

Municipality in Alagoas, Brazil

- Municipality of Alagoas, Brazil
- Flag Coat of arms

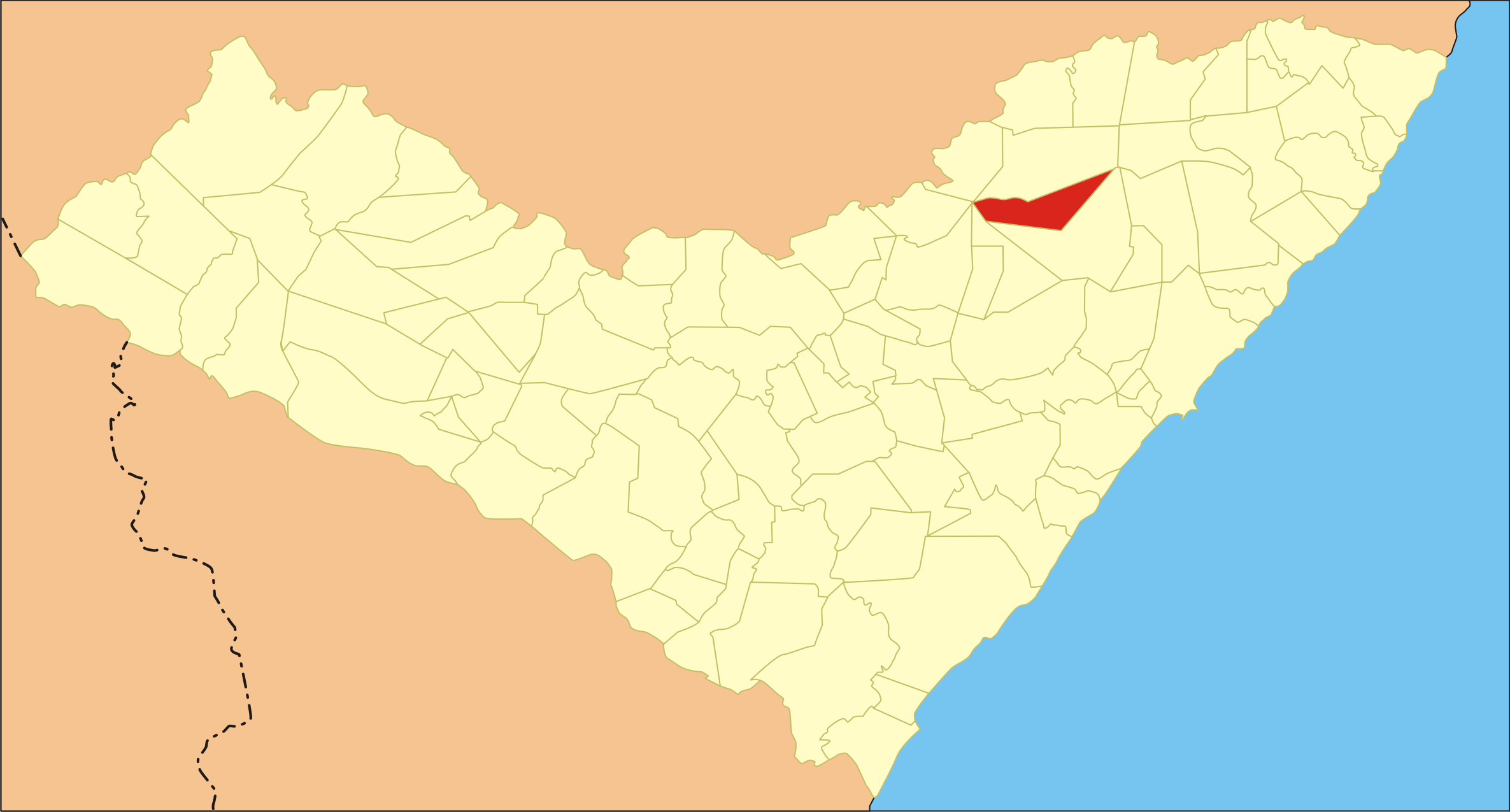
- Location of Branquinha in Alagoas

- Location within Brazil Location within South America
- Coordinates: 9°14′45″S 36°0′54″W
- Country: Brazil
- Region: Northeast
- State: Alagoas
- Founded: 18 May 1962

Government
  - Mayor: Raimundo José de Freitas Lopes (MDB) (2025-2028)
  - Vice Mayor: Renato Antonio Lima da Purificação (PT) (2025-2028)

Area
  - Total: 168.048 km^{2} (64.884 sq mi)
- Elevation: 90 m (300 ft)

Population (2022)
  - Total: 9,603
  - Density: 57.14/km^{2} (148.0/sq mi)
- Demonym: Branquinhense (Brazilian Portuguese)
- Time zone: UTC-03:00 (Brasília Time)
- Postal code: 57830-000
- HDI (2010): 0.513 – low
- Website: branquinha.al.gov.br

Branquinha (Central northeastern portuguese pronunciation: [bɾɐ̃ˈkĩj̃ɐ]) is a municipality located in the Brazilian state of Alagoas. Its population is 10,460 (2020) and its area is 191 km^{2}. It was devastated by flooding in June 2010.
