= Amazonas National Forest =

Brazilian national forest

- Floresta Nacional do Amazonas
- IUCN category VI (protected area with sustainable use of natural resources)
- Location within Brazil
- Nearest city: Barcelos, Amazonas
- Coordinates: 1.249°N 64.554°W
- Area: 1,944,209.59 hectares (4,804,246.5 acres)
- Designation: National forest
- Created: 1 March 1989
- Administrator: Chico Mendes Institute for Biodiversity Conservation

The Amazonas National Forest (Portuguese: Floresta Nacional do Amazonas) is a national forest in the state of Amazonas, Brazil.

== Location ==
The Amazonas National Forest is in the municipalities of Barcelos and Santa Isabel do Rio Negro in the state of Amazonas. It was created by decree nº 97.546 of 1 March 1989 with an estimated area of 1,573,100 hectares (3,887,000 acres). According to the Chico Mendes Institute for Biodiversity Conservation (ICMBio) the area is 1,944,209.59 hectares (4,804,246.5 acres).

The forest is in the Upper Rio Negro region along the border of Brazil and Venezuela and the border between the states of Amazonas and Roraima. It is bordered to the west by the Pico da Neblina National Park. Most of the forest is within the Yanomami Indigenous Territory. The conservation unit would be included in the proposed Northern Amazon Ecological Corridor. The vegetation is mainly dense rainforest (93%) but includes open rainforest (2%), campinarana (2%) and areas of contact between Campinarana and dense rainforest (3%).

== Conservation ==
The Amazonas National Forest is administered by ICMBio. It is classed as IUCN protected area category VI (protected area with sustainable use of natural resources) with the objective of sustainable multiple use of forest resources and scientific research, with emphasis on methods for sustainable exploitation of native forests.

The Instituto Socioambiental (ISA) has noted that the national forest, with its goal of sustainable forestry, conflicts with the goals of the Indigenous Territories with which it overlaps. In these territories the indigenous people have the exclusive right of use according to their customs and traditions. The ISA stated in August 2011 that for this reason the Amazonas National Forest should be repealed.

== Sources ==
- Ayres, José Márcio; Da Fonseca, Gustavo A. B.; Rylands, Anthony B.; Queiroz, Helder L.; Pinto, Luiz Paulo; Masterson, Donald; Cavalcanti, Roberto B. (2005), Os Corredores Ecológicos das Florestas Tropicais do Brasil (PDF) (in Portuguese), Sociedade Civil Mamirauá, archived from the original (PDF) on 2016-07-31
- Carlos Alberto Ricardo (22 August 2011), Gestão da FLONA Amazonas (PDF) (in Portuguese), Instituto Socioambiental – ISA
- Floresta Nacional do Amazonas (in Portuguese), Chico Mendes Institute for Biodiversity Conservation, archived from the original on 2019-08-06
- Floresta Nacional do Amazonas (in Portuguese), Via Rural, archived from the original on 2016-06-02
- José Sarney (1 March 1989), Decreto No 97.546, de 1º de Marco de 1989 (in Portuguese)
- "Terra Indígena Yanomami", Terras Indígenas no Brasil (in Portuguese), ISA: Instituto Socioambiental
- Unidade de Conservação: Floresta Nacional do Amazonas (in Portuguese), MMA: Ministério do Meio Ambiente
