= Xeruini River =

Coordinates: 1°18′S 61°56′W

Xeriuini River

Location
- Country: Brazil

Physical characteristics
- Source
  - location: Roraima state

The Xeriuini River is a river located in the Roraima state in northern Brazil.

== See also ==
- List of rivers of Roraima
