= Anauá River =

Location
- Country: Brazil

Physical characteristics
- Source
  - location: Roraima state
- Mouth
  - coordinates: 0°58′N 61°21′W

The Anauá River (Portuguese: Rio Anauá) is a river of the state of Roraima in northern Brazil. It is a tributary of the Branco River that flows eastward to the border with neighboring Guyana. In the Tupi language, Anauá translates to flowering tree.

== See also ==
- List of rivers of Roraima
