= Água Boa do Univini River =

River in Brazil

Coordinates: 0°29′02″N 61°42′06″W

Location
- Country: Brazil

Physical characteristics
- Source
  - location: Roraima state

The Água Boa do Univini River is a river of Roraima state in northern Brazil.

== See also ==
- List of rivers of Roraima
