= Uraricoera River =

- Uraricoera River (Brazil)

Location
- Country: Brazil

Physical characteristics
- Mouth
  - location: Confluence with Takutu River, Roraima, Brazil
  - coordinates: 3.030453°N 60.489600°W

Basin features
- River system: Branco River

The Uraricoera (or Uraricuera) River is a river of Roraima state in northern Brazil. The confluence of the Uraricoera and Takutu Rivers forms the Branco River.

== Basin ==
The river drains the Guayanan Highlands moist forests ecoregion. Part of the river's basin is in the Roraima National Forest. The Maracá Ecological Station was established by presidential decree on 2 June 1981. The station consists of the island of Maracá between the Santa Rosa and Maracá branches of the Uraricoera River in the municipality of Boa Vista, Roraima, with an area of 101,312 hectares (250,350 acres).

== See also ==
- List of rivers of Roraima
