= Catrimani River =

Coordinates: 0°28′07″N 61°42′47″W

Location
- Country: Brazil

Physical characteristics
- Source
  - location: Roraima state

The Catrimani River is a river of Roraima state in northern Brazil.

== See also ==
- List of rivers of Roraima
