= Takutu River =

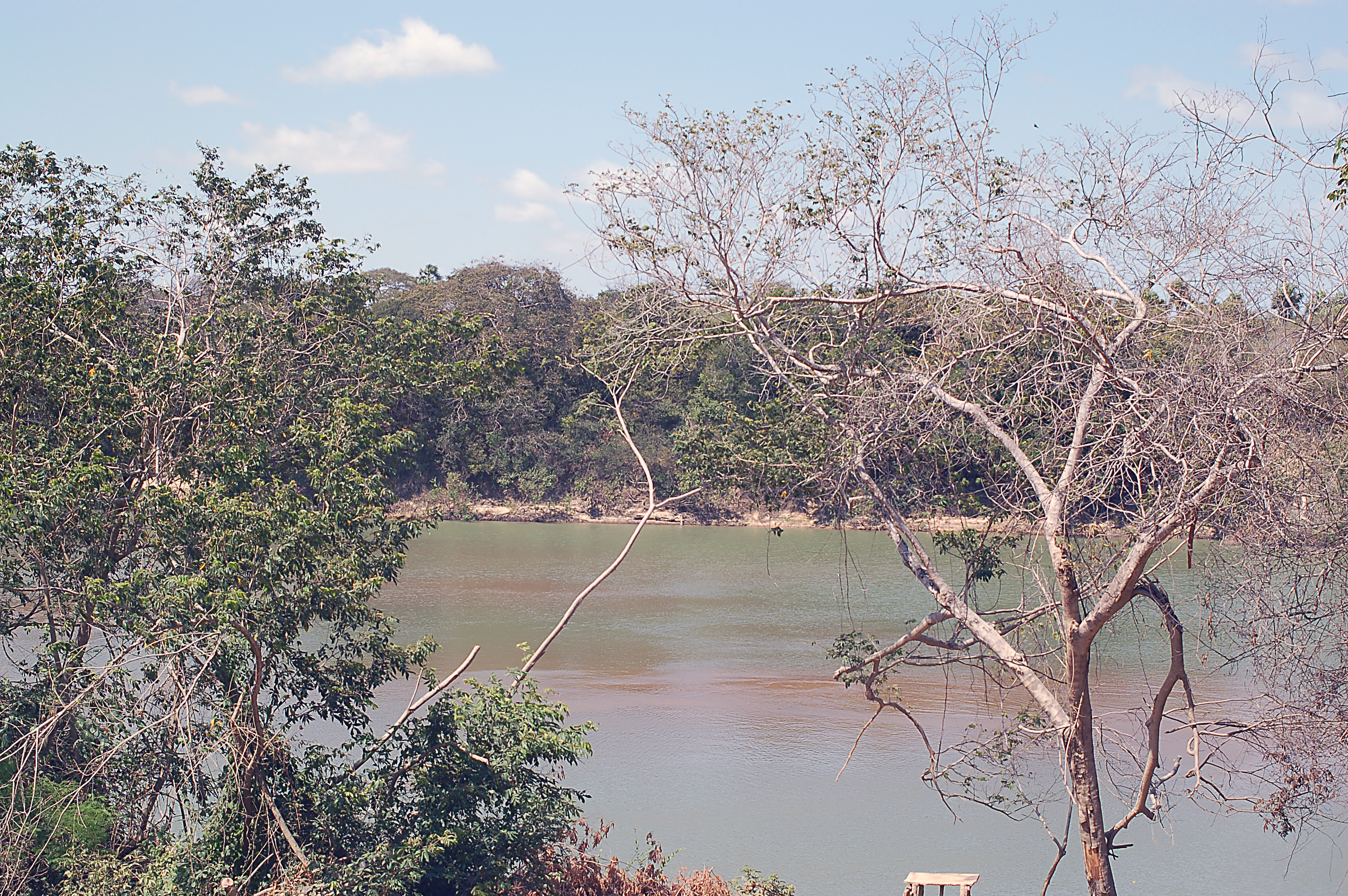
- Lethem, looking across the Takutu River into Brazil

- Location within Guyana Location within Roraima Location within Brazil

Location
- Country: Brazil; Guyana

Physical characteristics
- Source
  - coordinates: 1.9577°N 59.7411°W
- Mouth
  - location: Confluence with Uraricoera River
  - coordinates: 3°1′N 60°29′W

The Takutu River (Takatu River, Tacutu River) is a river in the Upper Takutu-Upper Essequibo Region of Guyana and Roraima in Brazil. It forms part of the boundary between the two countries. The confluence of the Takutu and Uraricoera Rivers forms the Branco River. The Takutu River's sources almost link with those of the Essequibo River; in the rainy season, flooding links the Takutu to the Rupununi River, a tributary of the Essequibo.

The Takutu River Bridge establishes an all-weather road connection between Guyana and Brazil.

Flooding of the Takutu effects the town of Lethem, the regional capital, and other settlements in the area such as St. Ignatius, Tabatinga, and Culvert City. The river experiences pollution in connection with gold-mining processes.

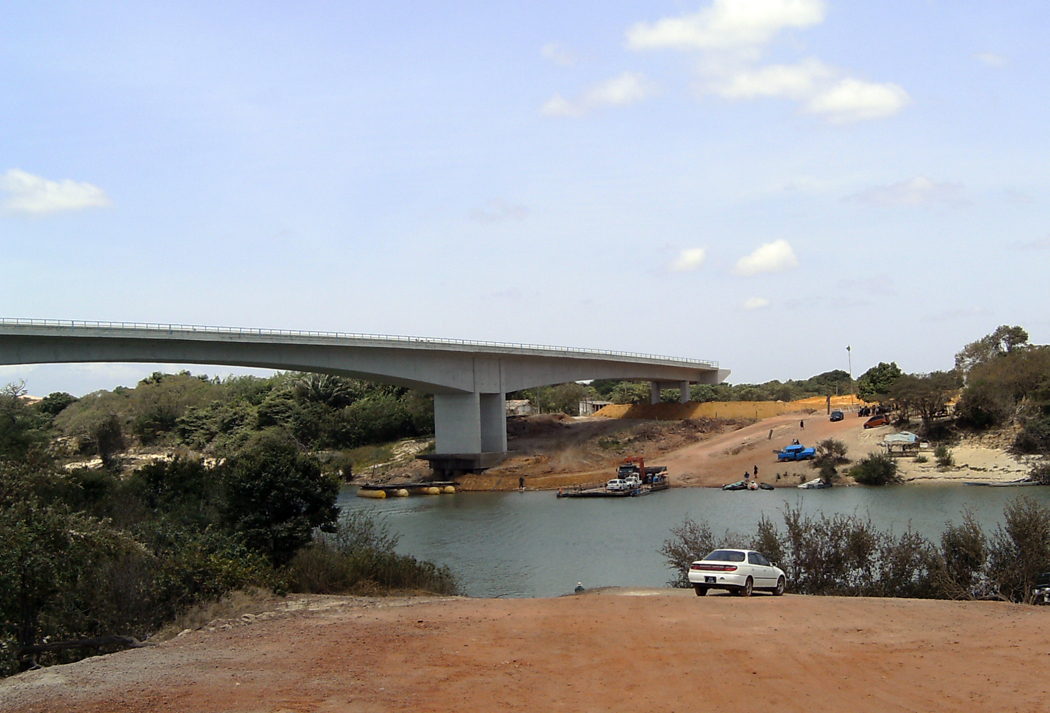
New Guyana - Brazil bridge in Lethem
