= List of municipalities in Roraima =

This is a list of the municipalities in the state of Roraima (RR), located in the North Region of Brazil. Roraima is divided into 15 municipalities.

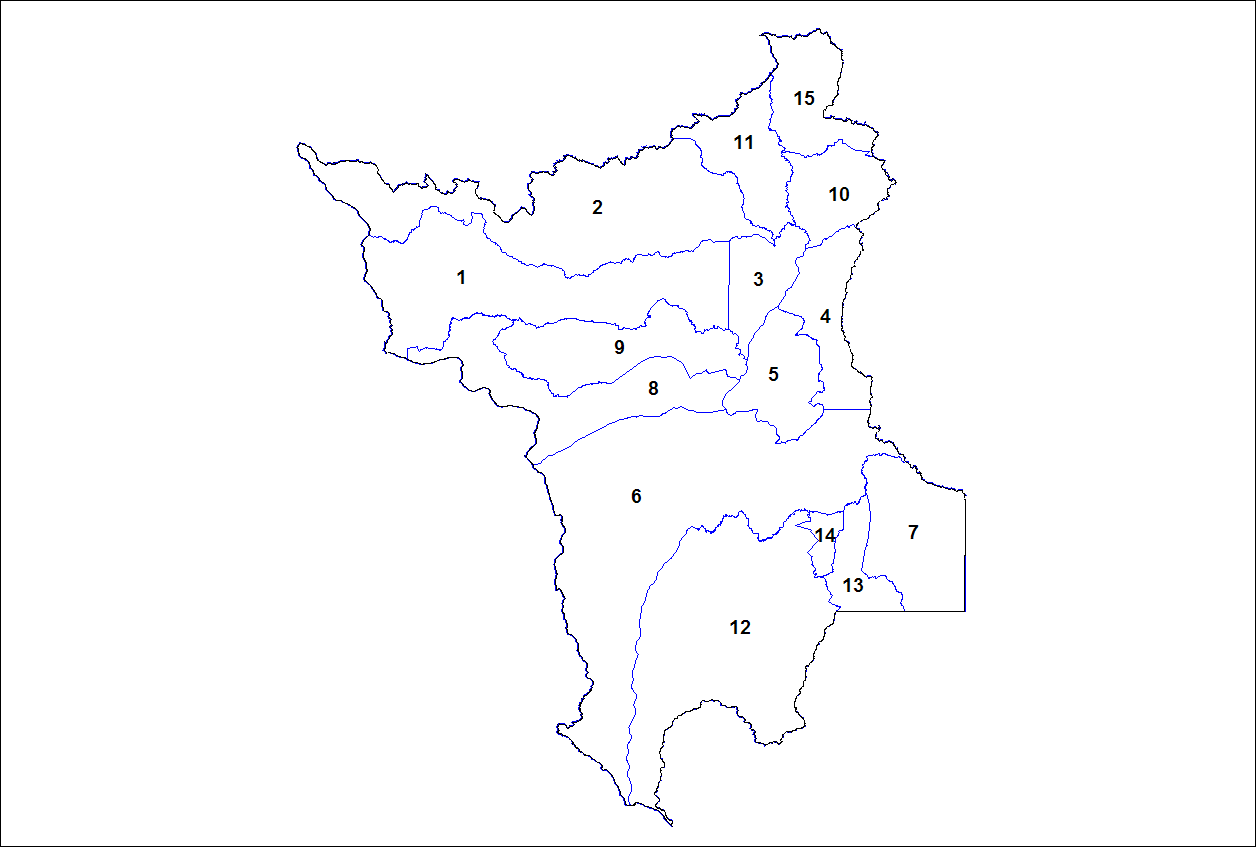
Municipalities of Roraima, Brazil

== Municipalities ==
† State capital

Municipalities in Roraima
Name	Immediate region	Intermediate region	Population (2022 census)	Population (2010 census)	Population change	Land area (km^{2})	Population density (2022)
Alto Alegre	Boa Vista	Boa Vista	21,096	16,448	+28.3%	25,567.0	0.8/km^{2}
Amajari	Pacaraima	Boa Vista	13,927	9,327	+49.3%	28,472.3	0.5/km^{2}
Boa Vista†	Boa Vista	Boa Vista	413,486	284,313	+45.4%	5,687.0	72.7/km^{2}
Bonfim	Boa Vista	Boa Vista	13,923	10,943	+27.2%	8,095.4	1.7/km^{2}
Cantá	Boa Vista	Boa Vista	18,682	13,902	+34.4%	7,664.8	2.4/km^{2}
Caracaraí	Caracaraí	Rorainópolis-Caracaraí	20,957	18,398	+13.9%	47,410.9	0.4/km^{2}
Caroebe	Rorainópolis	Rorainópolis-Caracaraí	10,656	8,114	+31.3%	12,066.2	0.9/km^{2}
Iracema	Caracaraí	Rorainópolis-Caracaraí	10,023	8,696	+15.3%	14,409.6	0.7/km^{2}
Mucajaí	Boa Vista	Boa Vista	18,095	14,792	+22.3%	12,461.2	1.5/km^{2}
Normandia	Pacaraima	Boa Vista	13,986	8,940	+56.4%	6,966.8	2.0/km^{2}
Pacaraima	Pacaraima	Boa Vista	19,305	10,433	+85.0%	8,028.5	2.4/km^{2}
Rorainópolis	Rorainópolis	Rorainópolis-Caracaraí	32,647	24,279	+34.5%	33,594.0	1.0/km^{2}
São João da Baliza	Rorainópolis	Rorainópolis-Caracaraí	8,858	6,769	+30.9%	4,285.0	2.1/km^{2}
São Luiz	Rorainópolis	Rorainópolis-Caracaraí	7,315	6,750	+8.4%	1,526.9	4.8/km^{2}
Uiramutã	Pacaraima	Boa Vista	13,751	8,375	+64.2%	8,065.5	1.7/km^{2}
Roraima	—	—	636,707	450,479	+41.34%	224,301.0	2.8/km^{2}
North Region	—	—	17,354,884	15,864,454	+9.39%	3,853,575.6	4.5/km^{2}
Brazil	—	—	203,080,756	190,755,799	+6.46%	8,502,728.3	23.9/km^{2}

== See also ==
- Geography of Brazil
