= List of municipalities in Roraima by HDI =

This is a list of municipalities in Roraima ordered by Human Development Index (HDI) according to data released by the United Nations Development Program (UNDP) of the United Nations for the 2010. The Human Development Index was developed in 1990 by the Pakistani economist Mahbub ul Haq and the Indian economist Amartya Sen.

According to the list, of the 15 municipalities in the state of Roraima, none of them have very high HDI (equal to or greater than 0.800), 1 has high HDI (between 0.700 and 0.799), 9 have medium (between 0.600 and 0.699), 3 have low (between 0.500 and 0.599) and 2 have very low (less than 0.500). The HDI of Roraima is 0.707 (considered high).

== Criteria ==
Map of HDI of the municipalities of Roraima. Legend: Very high (no municipality) High (1 municipality) Medium (9 municipalities) Low (3 municipalities) Very low (2 municipalities)

=== Categories ===
The index varies from 0 to 1, considering:

- Very high – 0.800 to 1.000
- High – 0.700 to 0.799
- Medium – 0.600 to 0.699
- Low – 0.500 to 0.599
- Very low – 0.000 to 0.499

=== Components ===
The HDI of the municipalities is an average between the income index, life expectancy index and educational index.

== List ==
Rank	Municipalities	Data of 2010
Rank	Municipalities	HDI
Very high HDI
no municipality
High HDI
1	Boa Vista	0.752
Medium HDI
2	Mucajaí	0.665
3	São João da Baliza	0.655
4	Pacaraima	0.650
5	São Luís	0.649
6	Caroebe	0.639
7	Bonfim	0.626
8	Caracaraí	0.624
9	Rorainópolis	0.619
10	Cantá	0.619
Low HDI
11	Normandia	0.594
12	Iracema	0.582
13	Alto Alegre	0.542
Very low HDI
14	Amajari	0.488
15	Uiramutã	0.453

== See also ==
- Geography of Brazil
