= Viruá National Park =

National park in Roraima, Brazil

- Parque Nacional do Viruá
- IUCN category II (national park)
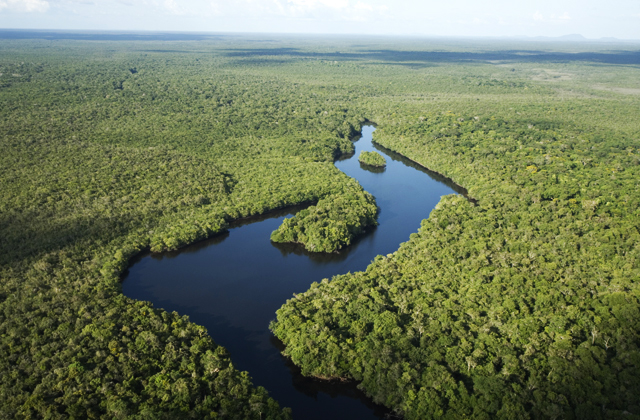

- Location within Brazil
- Nearest city: Caracaraí, Roraima
- Coordinates: 1.293°N 61.131°W
- Area: 241,948 hectares (597,870 acres)
- Designation: National park
- Administrator: Chico Mendes Institute for Biodiversity Conservation

Ramsar Wetland
- Designated: 22 March 2017
- Reference no.: 2295

Viruá National Park (Portuguese: Parque Nacional do Viruá) is a national park in the state of Roraima, Brazil. It protects an area with very infertile sandy soil, periodically flooded, that has no economic value but has exceptionally high biodiversity.

== Location ==
The Viruá National Park is in the Caracaraí municipality of Roraima. It has an area of 241,948 hectares (597,870 acres). (Note: The Instituto Socioambiental gives an area of 227,011 hectares (560,960 acres), possibly the pre-expansion area.) The main river is the Viruá Igarapé, a blackwater river with little sediment, which flows into the Anauá River along the southern limit of the park. The Anauá in turn feeds the Branco River, which forms the western boundary of the park. The Caracaraí Ecological Station and Niquiá Ecological Station lie along the opposite shore of the Branco River. The park adjoins the Baixo Rio Branco-Jauaperi Extractive Reserve to the south and the Anauá National Forest to the southeast.

== History ==
The Viruá National Park was created by decree on 29 April 1998. It is classed as IUCN protected area category II (national park). Objectives are to preserve natural ecosystems of great ecological relevance and scenic beauty, and to enable scientific research, educational activities, environmental interpretation, recreation in contact with nature and ecological tourism. It is administered by the Chico Mendes Institute for Biodiversity Conservation. The conservation unit is supported by the Amazon Region Protected Areas Program.

On 4 November 2010 public consultation began on expanding the area of the park. The consultative council was created on 20 November 2012. The management plan was approved on 17 April 2014.

== Environment ==
The park covers an extensive sandy plain, and holds the Viruá alluvial "megafan". Soils are extremely poor in nutrients and highly acidic. There is no potential for farming, grazing or forestry. The park is subject to seasonal flooding. The park holds a great patchwork of campinaranas and open or closed canopy forests. The many environments support high biodiversity, and the park is one of the main areas for studying campinarana. More than 2,000 plants species have been identified, and it is estimated that there are more than 5,000 in total, making it one of the most botanically diverse conservation units in Brazil.

== Sources ==
- Full list: PAs supported by ARPA, ARPA
- Parna do Viruá (in Portuguese), Chico Mendes Institute for Biodiversity Conservation, archived from the original on 2019-09-15
- PARNA do Viruá (in Portuguese), ISA: Instituto Socioambiental
- Unidade de Conservação: Parque Nacional Viruá (in Portuguese), MMA: Ministério do Meio Ambiente
