= Sítio São Raimundo =

- Village
- Map showing location of Sítio São Raimundo
- Coordinates: 1°51′12.61″S 60°6′5.59″W
- Country: Brazil
- State: Amazonas

Area
  - Total: 0.47 km^{2} (0.18 sq mi)
  - Land: 0.46 km^{2} (0.18 sq mi)
  - Water: 0.01 km^{2} (0.0039 sq mi)
- Elevation: 63 m (207 ft)

Sítio São Raimundo is a small logging village deep in the Amazon Rainforest, Amazonas, Brazil.The BR-174 road runs through it; the nearest settlement is Sítio Maria Aparecida.
