= List of Brazilian federative units by Human Development Index =

Map of the Brazilian states by Municipal Human Development Index (MHDI) in 2024

Introduced by the United Nations Development Programme (UNDP) in 1990, the Human Development Index (HDI) is a composite statistic of education, income and longevity indices, calculated in order to measure social and economic development within countries. It consists of a number between 0 and 1, comprising five tiers of human development—very low, low, medium, high, or very high—wherein the development is considered higher when closer to 1. According to the latest Human Development Report, published in 2015 and reflecting data from 2014, Brazil placed 75th among 188 countries with an HDI value of 0.755. The UNDP highlighted the "rapid advance" of Brazil in two decades, leaving a situation of low human development (0.590) in 1990, reaching medium development (0.669) in 2000 and, finally, achieving high human development (0.726) in 2010.

In order to bring a human development perspective to the national level, the UNDP also created, in 1998, the Human Development Atlas in Brazil, which calculates the HDI of all the Brazilian administrative divisions, based on data provided by the decennial censuses conducted by the Brazilian Institute of Geography and Statistics (IBGE). Released in 2013, in partnership with the Institute of Applied Economic Research (IPEA) and the João Pinheiro Foundation (FJP), the latest edition of the Human Development Atlas in Brazil shows that the average HDI of the Brazilian federative units grew by 47.5% from 1991 to 2010.

Since the beginning of the statistical series in 1991, the Federal District, which contains the national capital—Brasília—, has the highest HDI among the 27 federative units of Brazil, being the only one to fall in the category of very high human development according to 2010 figures. It also topped every subindex composing the HDI, except for longevity, when, in 1991, it was surpassed by Santa Catarina. Meanwhile, Alagoas set out the lowest HDI since 2000, especially due to a poor performance in education. Tocantins put forward the fastest progress in HDI value (0.330) from 1991 to 2010, while Rio de Janeiro had the smallest increase (0.188). According to the UNDP report, the states of the North and Northeast regions have the lowest indicators, with most municipalities registering low or medium human development, while in the South, more than 65% of municipalities have achieved high human development. The South and Southeast regions and the Federal District have the highest indicators and human development indices.

== Human Development Atlas ==
The methodology used by the UNDP to measure the Municipal Human Development Index (MHDI) of all 5,565 Brazilian municipalities and 27 federative units differs from that used for countries. Although it has the same three dimensions of the global HDI—education, income and longevity—it adapts the global methodology to the Brazilian context and the availability of national indicators. Therefore, a comparison between Brazilian federative units and countries is discouraged and the numbers cannot be used as a parameter. The global report uses mean years of schooling and expected years of schooling to evaluate education, while the local report utilizes schooling of the adult population and school flow of young people. In the case of income, while the global report uses GNI per capita (PPP USD), the local report makes use of the Municipal Income per capita (BRL). As for longevity, both use life expectancy at birth as indicator.

Abbreviations

MHDI	Municipal Human Development Index
E	Education index
I	Income index
L	Longevity index

Legend

0.800–1.000	Very high human development
0.700–0.799	High human development
0.600–0.699	Medium human development
0.500–0.599	Low human development
0.000–0.499	Very low human development

=== 2024 ===
The Municipal Human Development Index (MHDI) uses a different methodology from the global standard (HDI); it is not directly comparable to the international Human Development Index (HDI).

Rank	Federative unit	MHDI (2024)
Very high human development
1	Distrito Federal	0.866
2	São Paulo	0.838
3	Santa Catarina	0.833
4	Paraná	0.822
5	Rio de Janeiro	0.819
6	Rio Grande do Sul	0.818
7	Goiás	0.815
8	Mato Grosso	0.812
9	Minas Gerais	0.809
–	Brazil (average)	0.805
10	Espírito Santo	0.804
High human development
11	Mato Grosso do Sul	0.797
12	Tocantins	0.797
13	Rondônia	0.786
14	Roraima	0.780
15	Rio Grande do Norte	0.778
16	Ceará	0.773
17	Pernambuco	0.767
18	Amazonas	0.767
19	Piauí	0.764
20	Sergipe	0.761
21	Paraíba	0.760
22	Bahia	0.759
23	Amapá	0.759
24	Pará	0.758
25	Acre	0.754
26	Alagoas	0.746
27	Maranhão	0.745

== See also ==
- Federative units of Brazil
- List of municipalities in Amazonas by HDI
- List of municipalities in Mato Grosso do Sul by HDI
- List of municipalities in Rio Grande do Sul by HDI
- List of municipalities in Roraima by HDI
- List of municipalities in Santa Catarina by HDI
- List of municipalities in São Paulo by HDI
