= Sítio Maria Aparecida =

- Village
- Map showing location of Sítio Maria Aparecida
- Coordinates: 1°52′54.05″S 60°4′31.12″W
- Country: Brazil
- State: Amazonas

Area
  - Land: 5.49 km^{2} (2.12 sq mi)

Sítio Maria Aparecida is a logging village deep in the Amazon Rainforest, Amazonas, Brazil. The BR-174 road runs through it; the nearest settlement is Sítio São Raimundo.
