= George Amaro =

Brazilian computer scientist

- Known for: providing Internet

George Corrêa Amaro is a Brazilian computer scientist responsible for the connection of Roraima (Brazilian Amazon) to the Internet.

== Biography ==
Amaro began his data communication work on the state of Roraima in 1985, when he connected an Apple II microcomputer in the service of "Video Texto" of Telesp and a microcomputer TRS-80 in "Projeto Cirandão" of Embratel.

At Embrapa Roraima, he developed a connection between the first corporate local area network of the state in 1991, in a client-server architecture (a 386/DX 33Mhz server with 8MB RAM and 80GB HD MFM connected through a network Amplus to 3 12 MHz PC/XT).

In 1992, he was responsible for the introduction of free and open source software in the state of Roraima, and set up the first Intel 386 PCs running Unix (SCO), which then became the first Linux server.

Also in 1992, he made the first Internet connection and Web access in Roraima, with the support of Embratel, using RENPAC 2000 and implementing TCP/IP on a PC. The method used was to create a TCP/IP tunnel over RENPAC, connecting a PC at his home to a minicomputer at Embrapa Informática Agropecuária (which was connected with FAPESP).

Together with two friends, Marcus Vinicius Quintella and João Claver, he designed and implemented the first Internet Service Provider (ISP) in Roraima, TechNet, in 1996, with servers based entirely on open source software. He left the company in December 2004, but all that has been built yet kept working.

With TechNet, he configured and operated the first Internet-connected servers in Roraima, and authored the official website of the State of Roraima in 1997.

Embryos arose from social networks, through online chat services, thus creating the first IRC server for Roraima in 1997, connecting to the Brasnet network, with the first channel chat being about the state and the then well known Canal Roraima (#Roraima). Online games were also introduced, with the creation of the first Quake server in Roraima in 1999.

In 2001, he and his colleagues designed and implemented one of the first wireless (WiFi) networks for public access in Roraima, initiating the first broadband connections.

With the evolution of the Internet and the possibility of creating dynamic sites, he created the first information portal for the State of Roraima in January 2002, based on PHP and MySQL.
