= BR-174 (Brazil highway) =

Highway in Brazil

BR-174

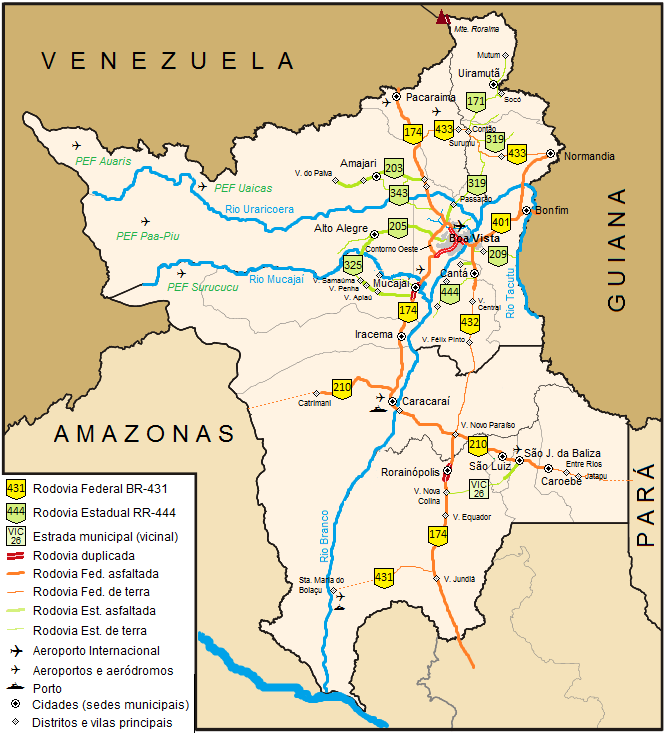

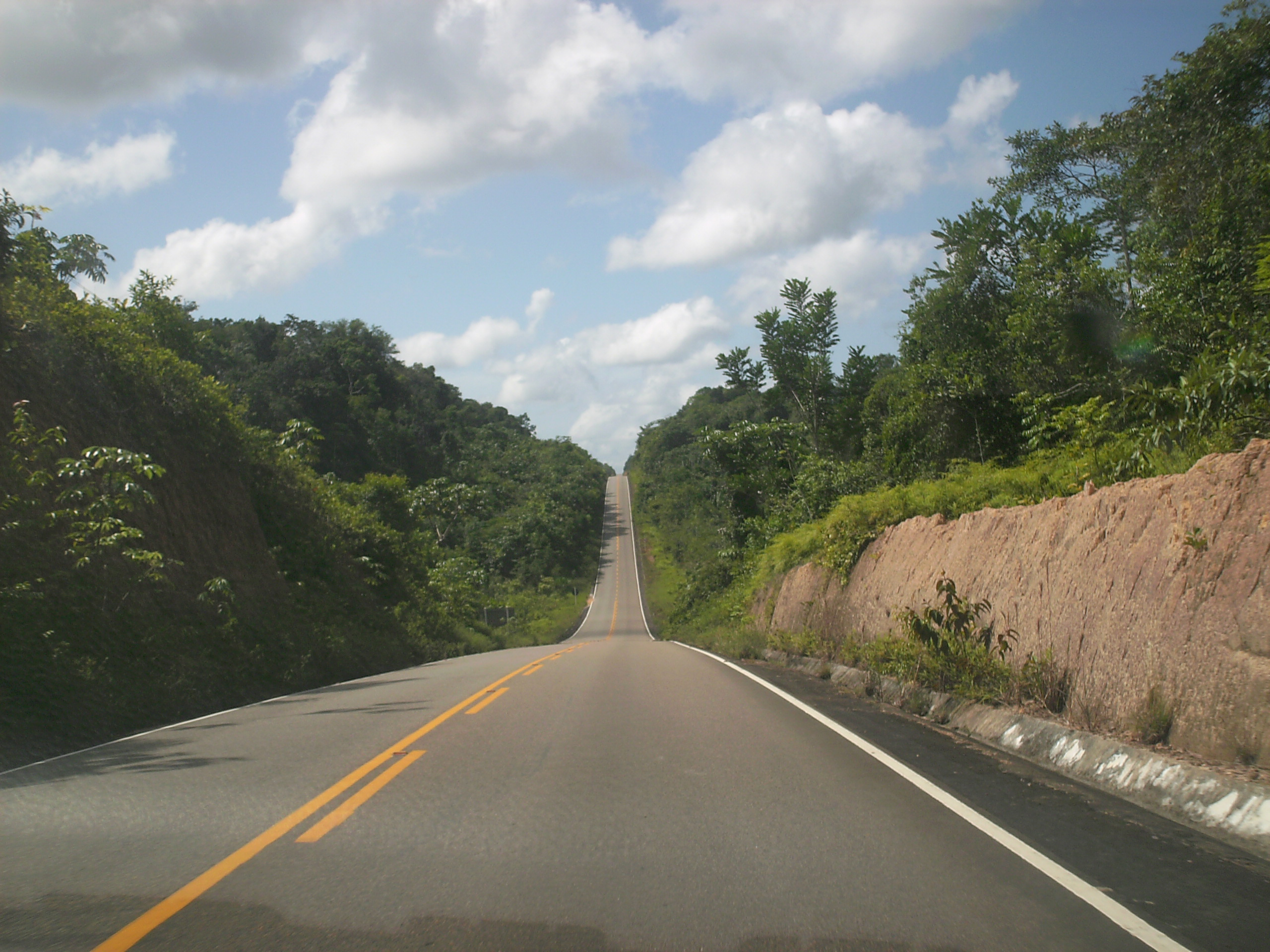
- BR-174 crossing the Amazon rainforest in the region of Rorainópolis

Route information
- Length: 3,319.9 km (2,062.9 mi)

Major junctions
- North end: Ciudad Guayana, Venezuela; Pacaraima, Roraima
- BR-433 Normandia; RR-203 Amajari; Boa Vista North; RR-205 Alto Alegre; Boa Vista South BR-401 Bonfim; RR-325 Mucajaí; Iracema; BR-210 Caracaraí; BR-210 São Luiz; Rorainópolis, Roraima; Presidente Figueiredo, Amazonas; AM-240 Balbina; AM-010 Manaus North; Eduardo Gomes Airport; Manaus Centre; BR-364 Vilhena, Rondônia; BR-364 Comodoro, Mato Grosso; Nova Lacerda; Pontes e Lacerda; MT-248 Jauru; Porto Esperidião; MT-339 São José; MT-175 Mirassol d'Oeste; BR-070 San Matías, Bolivia
- South end: Cáceres, Mato Grosso

Location
- Country: Brazil

Highway system
- Highways in Brazil; Federal

BR-174 is a federal highway of Brazil. The 3,321 km (2,064 mi) road connects Cáceres to Pacaraima on the Venezuelan border. It is the only road connection of the state of Roraima with the rest of Brazil. 458 kilometres are under construction, and there is no bridge over the Amazon River.

== Nocturnal closure ==
The highway is closed in the Waimiri Atroari Indigenous Territory every day between 18:30 and 06:00 of the following day. It is advisable to not stop inside the reserve. The reserve is occupied by nocturnal animals and some of the natives have nocturnal routines, too. Even during the day the number of accidents involving animals and cars is elevated. The Waimiri Atroari are involved in Fernanda Abra's Reconecta project to build wildlife bridges across the highway, to reduce roadkill.

== Paving status ==
Between the border of Brazil and Venezuela and Manaus, 974 km was paved in 1998, during the FHC government. Going to the state of Mato Grosso, the road has an asphalt surface between Manaus and Careiro. The road was constructed between Careiro and Manicoré, but the floor is still dirt in that stretch. Between Manicoré and Juína, the road alternates between stretches of dirt and stretches not yet constructed. Between Juína and Vilhena, the road is still dirt, however, there is a plan for paving this stretch. In the 542 km between Vilhena and Cáceres, the road is paved.
