= Caracaraí Ecological Station =

Ecological station in Roraima, Brazil

- Estação Ecológica de Caracaraí
- IUCN category Ia (strict nature reserve)
- Location within Brazil
- Nearest city: Boa Vista, Roraima
- Coordinates: 1.806°N 61.350°W
- Area: 86,793 hectares (214,470 acres)
- Designation: Ecological station
- Created: 31 May 1982; 44 years ago

Caracaraí Ecological Station (Portuguese: Estação Ecológica de Caracaraí) is an ecological station in the state of Roraima, Brazil.

== Location ==
The ecological station, which covers 86,793 hectares (214,470 acres), was created on 31 May 1982. It is in the municipality of Caracaraí in the state of Roraima. It adjoins the Yanomami Indigenous Territory to the west. The station is named after the municipality, whose name means "little hawk", a very common bird in the region. It is administered by the Chico Mendes Institute for Biodiversity Conservation.

== Conservation ==
The ecological station is a "strict nature reserve" under IUCN protected area category Ia. The purpose is preservation of nature and support of scientific research. The vegetation is characteristic of transition forest, with trees 15 to 20 metres (49 to 66 ft) tall with thin trunks. There are several layers, with the higher trees losing their leaves in the dry season. The rubber tree Hevea brasiliensis is one of the upper layer trees. Protected species include white-bellied spider monkey (Ateles belzebuth).

== Sources ==
- Estação Ecológica de Caracaraí (in Portuguese), Chico Mendes Institute for Biodiversity Conservation
- ESEC de Caracaraí, Unidades de Conservação no Brasil
- Estação Ecológica de Caracaraí (in Portuguese), Via Rural, archived from the original on 2016-12-20
- "Terra Indígena Yanomami", Terras Indígenas no Brasil (in Portuguese), ISA: Instituto Socioambiental
- Unidade de Conservação: Estação Ecológica de Caracaraí (in Portuguese), MMA: Ministério do Meio Ambiente
