= Fernanda Abra =

Brazilian biologist

Fernanda Abra holding a turtle at Waimiri Atroari village

Fernanda Delborgo Abra is a Brazilian biologist who has worked on aerial bridges for animals to cross roads at canopy level, and on detection and identification of animals at roadsides. She has been awarded a Future For Nature Award, a Whitley Award, and the National Geographic Society's Wayfinder Award.

== Education ==
Abra graduated in biology from ESALQ in 2009, and gained a masters degree from University of São Paulo in 2012 with a dissertation "Monitoramento e avaliação das passagens inferiores de fauna presentes na rodovia SP-225 no Município de Brotas, São Paulo" (Monitoring and evaluation of wildlife underpasses on the SP-225 highway in the municipality of Brotas, São Paulo). She gained a PhD in 2019 from the University of São Paulo with the title "Impacto de Rodovias nas Comunidades de Médios e Grandes Mamíferos e Implicações para Conservação" (Impact of Highways on Medium and Large Mammal Communities and Implications for Conservation). She has a post-doctoral fellowship with the Smithsonian Institution Fellowship Program (SIFP).

== Work ==
She formed a company, ViaFauna, consulting on reducing harms from animal interactions with transport networks.

Looking at canopy bridge: Fernanda Abra (left) of the Smithsonian, with Wame Viana Atroari (right), leader of Waimiri-Atroari

She also founded the Reconecta Project in Brazil to hang aerial bridges of net and PVC between canopy trees on opposite sides of a road, for primates and other wildlife to cross. At the time she was an associate at the Brazilian Instituto de Pesquisas Ecológicas.

This bridges project started in 2021, and was supported by the local Waimiri Atroari tribe. As of February 2025 the project had established over 30 canopy bridges across the 3,300 km (2,000 miles) of BR-174 (Brazil highway) in the Amazon. The approach connects areas separated by roads, and protects wildlife from being roadkill. Each has cameras recording crossings and approaches, to find animals which approach but do not cross. Trials of different designs led to a combination which allow several methods of locomotion. In 2024 Reconecta expanded to Suriname.

By 2026 the Brazilian highway department recommended the bridges, and they had been used by the Peruvian spider monkey, Purus red howler, northern night monkey, tufted capuchin, Schneider's marmoset, Alta Floresta titi monkey, opossums, sloths and mouse opossums.

Bridges have also been used across urban roads in Alta Floresta, a city of 60,000 people. Six primate species are common in urban areas there. An average of 12 animals per day use the urban bridges, publicized on a billboard in the main square. These bridges are made of concrete, rope and steel cable, materials costing around $3,000 for each bridge.

== Awards ==
Abra received the €50,000 Future for Nature Award in 2019, when the awards were presented by Russell Mittermeier, and the £40,000 Whitley Award in 2024. She received the Wayfinder Award from the National Geographic Society in 2026.

== Selected publications ==
- Rossi, Ana Rubia Schmitt; Abra, Fernanda Delborgo; Magioli, Marcelo; Morato, Ronaldo Gonçalves; Bovendorp, Ricardo Siqueira (January 2026). "On the road's side: the influence of a road on the agroforestry vertebrate community". Oryx. 60 (1): 69–80. doi:10.1017/S0030605325102597.
- Abra, Fernanda D.; Goebel, Luan G. A.; Gregory, Tremaine; Alonso, Alfonso; Grilo, Clara; Huijser, Marcel P. (1 November 2025). "A century documenting roads' toll on global biodiversity". Global Ecology and Conservation. 63 e03859. Bibcode:2025GEcoC..6303859A. doi:10.1016/j.gecco.2025.e03859. ISSN 2351-9894.
- Abra, Fernanda D.; Goebel, Luan G.A.; Gregory, Tremaine; de Freitas, Maelle L.; Canale, Gustavo; Martins, Juliana A.; Alonso, Alfonso (March 2025). "Building bridges for threatened primates in the Arc of Deforestation". Oryx. 59 (2): 149–150. doi:10.1017/S0030605325000171.
- Ascensão, Fernando; Yogui, Débora R.; Alves, Mario H.; Alves, Amanda Carolina; Abra, Fernanda; Desbiez, Arnaud L.J. (January 2021). "Preventing wildlife roadkill can offset mitigation investments in short-medium term". Biological Conservation. 253 108902. Bibcode:2021BCons.25308902A. doi:10.1016/j.biocon.2020.108902. hdl:10451/59775.
- Abra, Fernanda Delborgo; Huijser, Marcel Pieter; Magioli, Marcelo; Bovo, Alex Augusto Abreu; Ferraz, Katia Maria Paschoaletto Micchi de Barros (January 2021). "An estimate of wild mammal roadkill in São Paulo state, Brazil". Heliyon. 7 (1) e06015. Bibcode:2021Heliy...706015A. doi:10.1016/j.heliyon.2021.e06015. PMC 7846925. PMID 33553734.
