= Niquiá Ecological Station =

- Estação Ecológica de Níquia
- IUCN category Ia (strict nature reserve)
- Location within Brazil
- Nearest city: Caracaraí, Roraima
- Coordinates: 1°16′01″N 61°27′07″W
- Area: 284,787 hectares (703,720 acres)
- Designation: Ecological station
- Created: 3 June 1985

Niquiá Ecological Station (Portuguese: Estação Ecológica de Níquia) is an ecological station in the Caracaraí municipality of Roraima state, Brazil.

== History ==
The station, which has an area of 284,787 hectares (703,720 acres), was created on 3 June 1985. It is administered by the Chico Mendes Institute for Biodiversity Conservation. The conservation unit is supported by the Amazon Region Protected Areas Program. The unit was created to preserve the genetic banks of the flora. It is named after the stream from which Aniquiá takes its name. It lies in the Caracaraí municipality of Roraima state.

== Status ==
As of 2009 the Ecological Station was a "strict nature reserve" under IUCN protected area category Ia, with a terrestrial area of 286,600 hectares (708,000 acres). The station is a region of transition forest, with tall trees with thin trunks. Fauna are representative of both the Amazon and the cerrado. The white-bellied spider monkey (ateles belzebuth) is protected in the station.

== Sources ==
- "Estação Ecológica de Níquia", Ambiente Brasil, 23 June 2010
- Estação Ecológica Niquiá (in Portuguese), Chico Mendes Institute for Biodiversity Conservation
- Full list: PAs supported by ARPA, ARPA
- Triana, Elisa (29 May 2009), "Strict Nature Reserves in Brazil", The Encyclopedia of Earth
