= Alto Alegre, Roraima =

Municipality of Roraima, Brazil

Alto Alegre
- Municipality
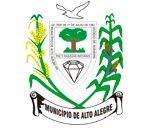
- Flag Coat of arms

- Location in Roraima state

- Location in Brazil
- Coordinates: 2°59′16″N 61°18′16″W
- Country: Brazil
- Region: North
- State: Roraima

Government
  - Mayor: Pedro Henrique Machado (PSD)

Area
  - Total: 25,567 km^{2} (9,871 sq mi)

Population (2022)
  - Total: 21,066
  - Density: 0.82395/km^{2} (2.1340/sq mi)
- Time zone: UTC−4 (AMT)
- Website: altoalegre.rr.gov.br

Alto Alegre (Brazilian Portuguese pronunciation: [ˈawtu aˈlɛɡɾi]) is a city in the Brazilian state of Roraima. The population in 2020 was 15,380, and the area is 25,567 km^{2}. Its limits are Amajari to the north, Boa Vista in the east, Mucajaí and Iracema in the south, and Venezuela in the west.

Alto Alegre was founded by Pedro Costa, a gold miner. In 1982, it became an independent municipality. It can be accessed from the RR-205 highway from Boa Vista.

The municipality contains part of the Roraima National Forest.
