= Roraima =

State of Brazil

- State
- Flag Coat of arms
- Motto: Amazônia: patrimônio dos brasileiros (English: The Amazon: Brazilians' heritage)
- Anthem: Hino de Roraima [pt]
- Location in Brazil
- Coordinates: 2°3′N 61°24′W
- Country: Brazil
- Capital and largest city: Boa Vista

Government
  - Type: Unitary state
  - Governor: Soldado Sampaio (interim, REP)
  - Vice Governor: Vacant
  - Senators: Chico Rodrigues (PSB); Hiran Gonçalves (PP); Roberta Acioly (REP)
  - Legislature: Legislative Assembly of Roraima

Area
  - Total: 223,644.527 km^{2} (86,349.635 sq mi)
  - Rank: 14th

Population (2022)
  - Total: 636,707
  - Rank: 27th
  - Density: 2.84696/km^{2} (7.37359/sq mi)
  - Rank: 27th
- Demonym(s): Roraiman; Roraimense (pt)

GDP (2024)
  - Total: R$27.888 billion (US$5.175 billion)

HDI
  - Year: 2024
  - Category: 0.780 – high (14th)
- Time zone: UTC−4 (AMT)
- Postal Code: 69300-000 to 69399-000
- ISO 3166 code: BR-RR
- Website: portal.rr.gov.br

Roraima (English: /rəˈraɪmə/, rə-RY-mə; Brazilian Portuguese: [ʁoˈɾajmɐ] or [ʁoˈɾɐ̃jmɐ]) is one of the 26 states of Brazil. Located in the country's North Region, it is the northernmost and most geographically and logistically isolated state in Brazil. It is bordered by the state of Pará to the southeast, Amazonas to the south and west, Venezuela to the north and northwest, and Guyana to the east.

The state covers an area of approximately 223,644.527 square kilometres (86,300 sq mi), slightly larger than Belarus, being the fourteenth largest Brazilian state by area. The city of Boa Vista is the capital and largest city in the state, and is the only capital in the country located entirely in the Northern Hemisphere. Antônio Denarium, a member of the conservative Progressistas party, has been the governor of the state since 2019.

Roraima is the least populous state in Brazil, with an estimated population of 631,181 inhabitants as of 2020. It is also the state with the lowest population density in Brazil, with 2.01 inhabitants per square kilometre. Its economy, based mainly on the tertiary sector, registers a high growth rate, although its Gross Domestic Product (GDP) is the lowest in the country, with R$ 16.024 billion, representing only 0.20% of the Brazilian economy.

The history of Roraima is strongly linked to the Branco River, which allowed the first Portuguese settlers to arrive in the region. The Branco River Valley's strategic position made it coveted by the English and the Dutch, who entered Brazil through the Guiana Shield in search of indigenous people to be enslaved. The Spaniards also came to invade the northern part of the Branco River and the Uraricoera River through Venezuela. The Portuguese settlers defeated and expelled all invaders, establishing Portugal's sovereignty over the region of Roraima and part of the Amazonas.

As a result of crisis in Venezuela since the 2010s, Roraima has become the leading entry point for Venezuelan refugees in Brazil. Displaced Venezuelans in Roraima are estimated to number around 100,000, approximately one-sixth of the state's population.

== Etymology ==
The word "Roraima" comes from the Pemon language. Its etymology gives it three possible meanings: "Green Peak", "Mother of the Winds" and "Cashew Mountain". It would be the junction of roro (parrot) and imã (father, former). In that language, roro- or also rora- means "green", and imã means mountain or peak, thus forming the word "Green Peak", reflecting the natural landscape of that specific region.

There is a possibility that the word "Roraima" has two other meanings: "Mother of the Winds" and "Cashew Mountain". The first meaning comes from the windy climate in the region, where indigenous people believed that the winds that blew through southern Venezuela came from that place. The second, "Cashew Mountain", is due to the many mountains and hills that exist in the area.

== History ==
The first Portuguese settlers arrived in the region by the Branco River. Before the arrival of the Portuguese, the English and the Dutch were already attracted to the region, to explore the Branco River Valley through the Guyanas. Portugal's sovereignty over the region was only established after the Spaniards invaded the northern part of the Branco River, along with the Uraricoera River. From 1725, Carmelite missionaries began the task of converting the indigenous peoples in the region.

The Portuguese occupation intensified from the 1730s when it traveled the Branco River in search of consolidation of the borders and indigenous labour. For this, they organized rescue troops (purchase of indigenous people transformed into slaves during wars of opposing ethnic groups), war troops (punishment and enslavement of indigenous people who attacked Portuguese nuclei or prevented evangelization) and the search for Brazilian products for sale, the so-called sertão drugs. Also, they promoted descents – villages of missionaries and indigenous volunteers or compulsory.

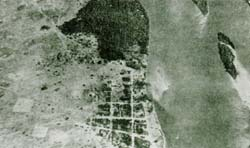
Aerial view of the Boa Vista region at the beginning of the 20th century

In the middle of the 18th century, the Portuguese Crown became concerned with the constant Spanish expeditions to the western region of the Amazon. Thus, the idea of creating the Royal Captaincy of São José do Rio Negro was considered, which occurred through the Royal Charter of 3 March 1755. The main reason for the creation of the captaincy was the fear of the Spanish threat from the Viceroyalty of Peru, and the arising fear from the Dutch expeditions in Suriname to trade and imprison indigenous peoples.

The demarcations foresaw by the Treaty of Madrid, of 1750, also lead to a great extent: with the creation of a new administrative unit in the region, the intention was to implement, in practice, the colonization of the Upper Negro River, creating the necessary infrastructure for the meeting and the work of the Portuguese and Spanish demarcation committees, and this meeting never took place, having Portuguese moulds temporarily occupied the course of the lower Branco River in the meantime, carrying out plantations of manioc and other food, for the provisioning of the commission.

The São Joaquim Fort, built in 1755 at the confluence of the Uraricoiera River with the Takutu River, was decisive in the conquest of the Branco River by the Portuguese. The Fort, which no longer exists today, had the main purpose of providing the Portuguese with total sovereignty of Portugal over the lands of the Branco River Valley, which aroused international greed due to its little exploitation.

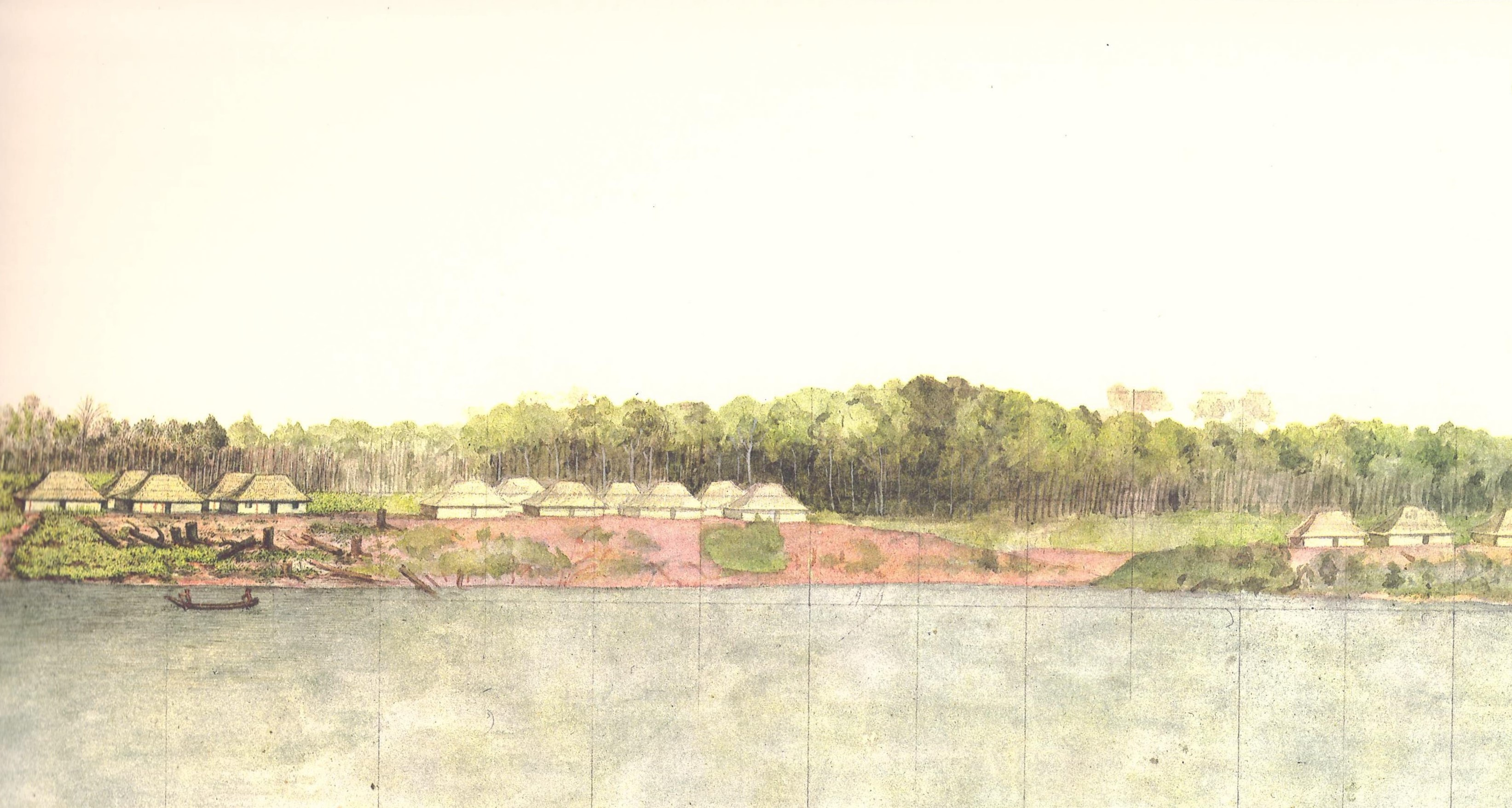
Village of Nossa Senhora da Conceição according to Alexandre Rodrigues Ferreira, late 18th century

The Portuguese colonizers, after assuming sovereignty and total control of the region, created several villages and towns in the locality, together with indigenous natives. Nossa Senhora da Conceição and Santo Antônio, on the Uraricoera River; São Felipe, on the Takutu River and Nossa Senhora do Carmo and Santa Bárbara, on the Branco River, were the main settlements created at the time, housing a significant population number. However, due to the conflicts between the indigenous and the colonizers, because the indigenous people did not accept to submit to the conditions imposed by the Portuguese, the villages did not develop.

To guarantee the presence of the Portuguese settlers in the lands of the Branco River Valley, commander Manuel da Gama Lôbo d'Almada started breeding cattle and horses in the territory, in 1789. The farms of São Bento, São José and São Marcos, on the Uraricoera and Takutu rivers, respectively, were the first to permanently introduce cattle and equine breeding, between 1793 and 1799. Currently, the São Marcos farm belongs to the indigenous people and is located in front of the place where Fort São Joaquim was located.

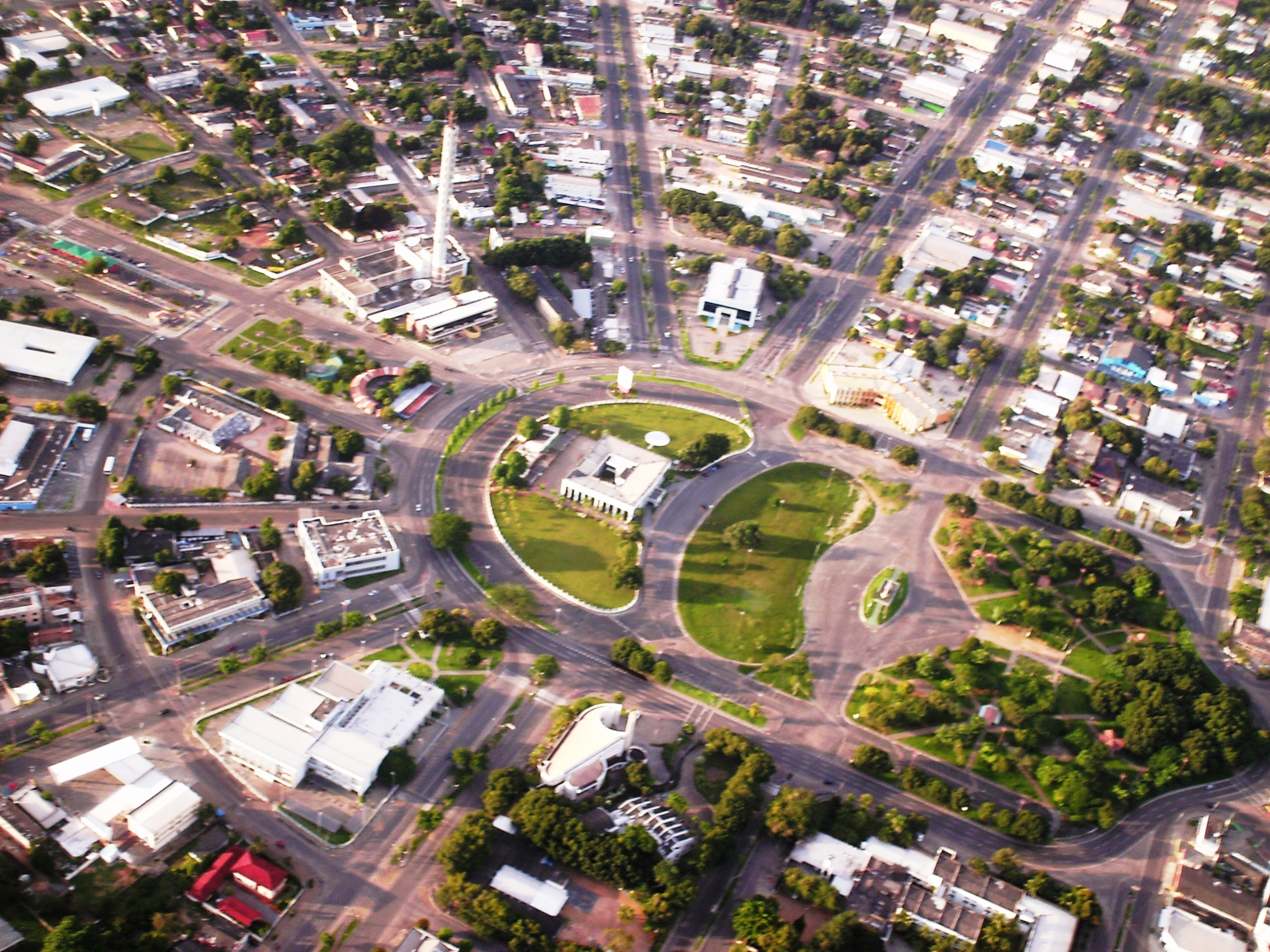
Centre of Boa Vista

For a year, between 1810 and 1811, English soldiers entered the Valley but were expelled by the commander of São Joaquim Fort. The border between Brazil and Guyana, whose border demarcation process had already been closed, needed to be re-marked, due to the great English invasions that occurred in that period after 1835 after Robert Schomburgk, a German-born explorer, under orders of English government, was surveying and collecting data on the territory of Esequibo disputed with Venezuela. He sent information back home explaining that the Portuguese-Brazilians did not actually control the Pirara territory, and suggested that the British Empire annex the territory as its own colony. Therefore, the colonization of the Branco River was divided into four periods: From 1750 to the beginning of the 19th century, with the discovery of the Branco River; from the mid-19th century until the creation of the municipality of Boa Vista, in 1890; from 1890 until the creation of the Federal Territory of Rio Branco; and the creation of the Federal Territory of Rio Branco to elevate it to the category of Brazilian federative unit renamed Roraima.

Decree-Law No. 5,812 of 13 September 1943, which dismembered the state of Amazonas, created the Federal Territory of Rio Branco. In 1962, the territory was called the Federal Territory of Roraima and elevated to the category of Brazilian federative unit by the Brazilian Constitution of 1988.

The colonization of the region was highly encouraged at the end of the 19th century, with the establishment of National Farms. However, the state's population only found stability after its emancipation, a century later, with the gold and diamond mines that attracted migratory waves from different regions of the country. This disorderly immigration and exploitation resulted in many conflicts and deaths due to illnesses and murders in the locality. Currently, almost all of the state's indigenous reserves are approved.

== Geography ==
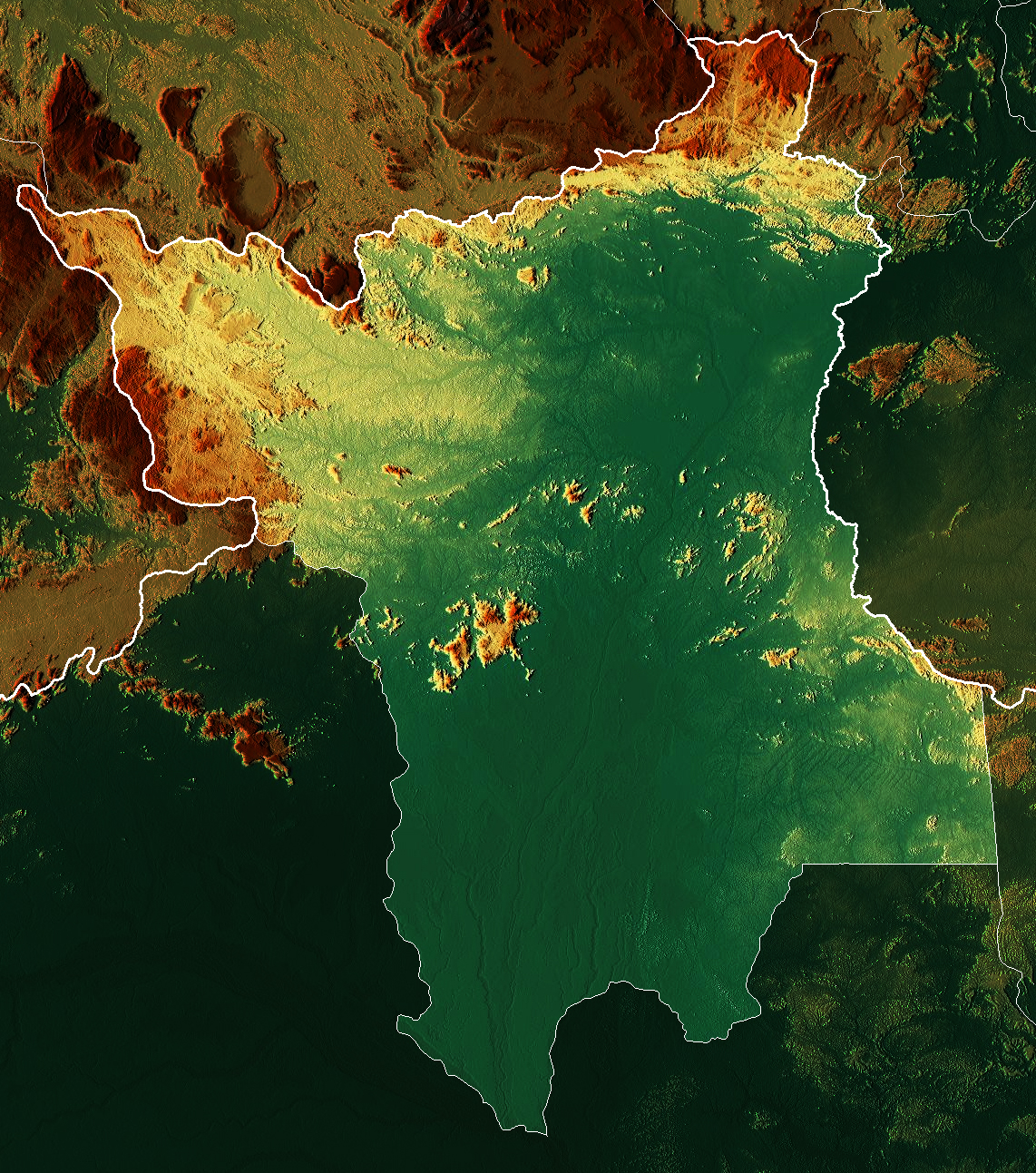
Topographic map of Roraima

Roraima is a state in the North Region of Brazil, being the northernmost state in the Federative Republic of Brazil. It has 1,922 kilometres of border with South American countries. It is bordered by the state of Pará to the southeast for 107 km, Amazonas to the south and west for about 1,200 km partly across the Jufari, Jauaperi and Alalau rivers, Venezuela to the north and northwest for 1,403 km across the Serra Parima and north across the Serra Pacaraima, and Guyana to the east for 964 km. Roraima covers an area of approximately 223,644.527 km^{2} (86,300 square miles), slightly larger than Belarus, being the fourteenth largest Brazilian state by area.

Approximately 104,018 km^{2} (40,200 square miles) of the state is composed of indigenous areas, representing almost half of the state's territory (46.37%). The area of environmental preservation in the state, under the responsibility of the Chico Mendes Institute for Biodiversity Conservation (ICMBio), is also extensive, with 18,879 km^{2} (7,300 square miles), 8.42% of Roraima's area. For this reason, Roraima is the Brazilian state with the second-highest percentage of territory formed by protected areas, behind only the state of Amapá.

=== Relief ===
Mount Roraima, located in Pacaraima Mountains, is the highest point in the state and one of the highest in the country, with 2,875 m (9,400 feet). The relief in the state is quite varied. Near the borders of Venezuela and Guyana are the mountains of Parima and Pacaraima, where Mount Roraima is located, with an altitude of 2,875 m (9,400 feet). As it is in the far north of Brazil, its points in the far north are the Uailan River and Mount Caburaí.

Roraima is predominantly flat. About 60% of the area is below 200 m (700 feet), about 25% averages between 200 and 300 metres, 14% from 300 to 900 metres and only 1% has elevations over 900 metres above sea level. There are also two geomorphological structures: the Wavy Plateau and the Northern Escarpments, which are part of the Guiana Shield. Its Wavy Plateau is a large pediplain, formed by isolated and dispersed massifs and peaks.

Because of its variations, the relief is divided into five degrees: The first-degree houses areas of the state that can be flooded, which do not have a specific form of relief, but which are covered by a thin layer of water; the second degree would be the Branco River pediplain, an important unit of enormous expression in the state since it occupies a large part of its lands. In this pediplain, the altitudes vary from 70 to 160 metres and have a low slope towards the river channels. The third degree is formed by elevations that can reach an altitude of 400 metres. There are mountain ranges such as Serra da Lua, Serra Grande, Serra da Batata and others. The fourth degree is characterized by elevations that can vary from 600 to 2,000 metres of altitude, formed mainly by the Pacaraima mountain range, Serra do Parima and Serra do Urucuzeiro. These mountains are joined in the form of chains and the rivers that form the Uraricoera river are born there. Finally, the fifth degree, groups the highest regions, formed by elevations that reach almost 3,000 metres of altitude.

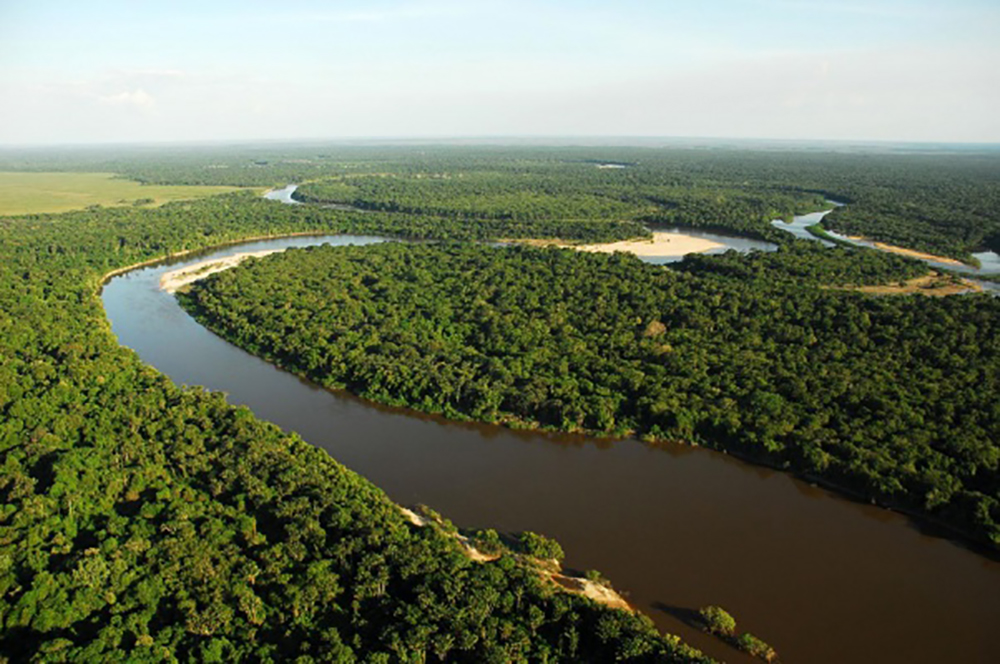
Landscape of the Viruá National Park

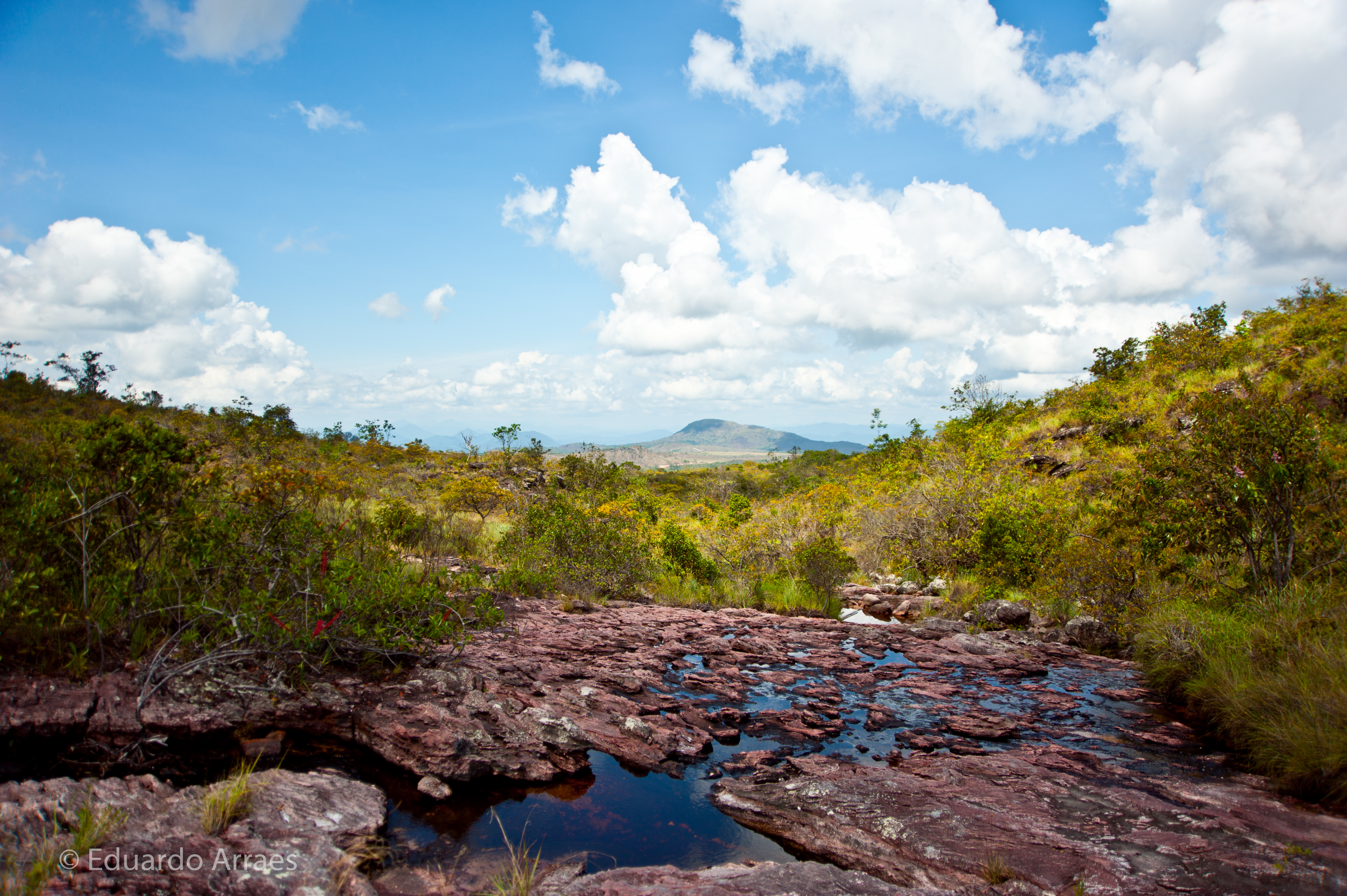
Rock formations in the Serra do Tepequém

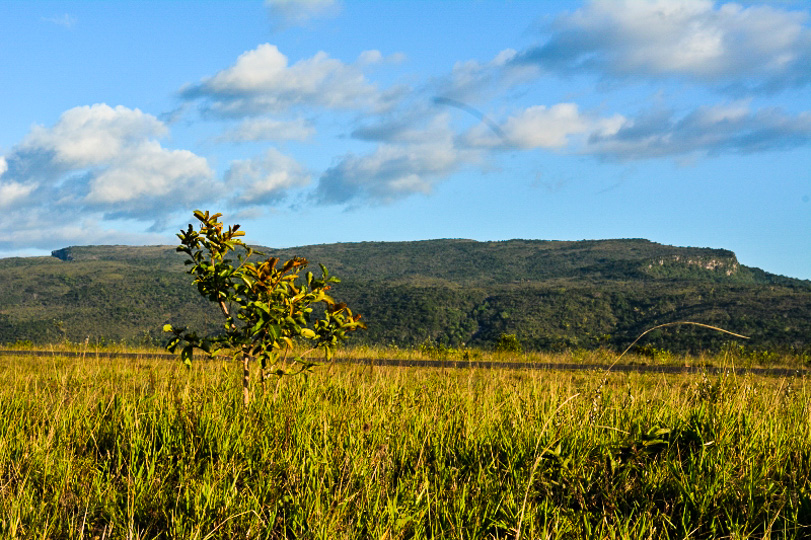
Savannah landscape in northeastern Roraima

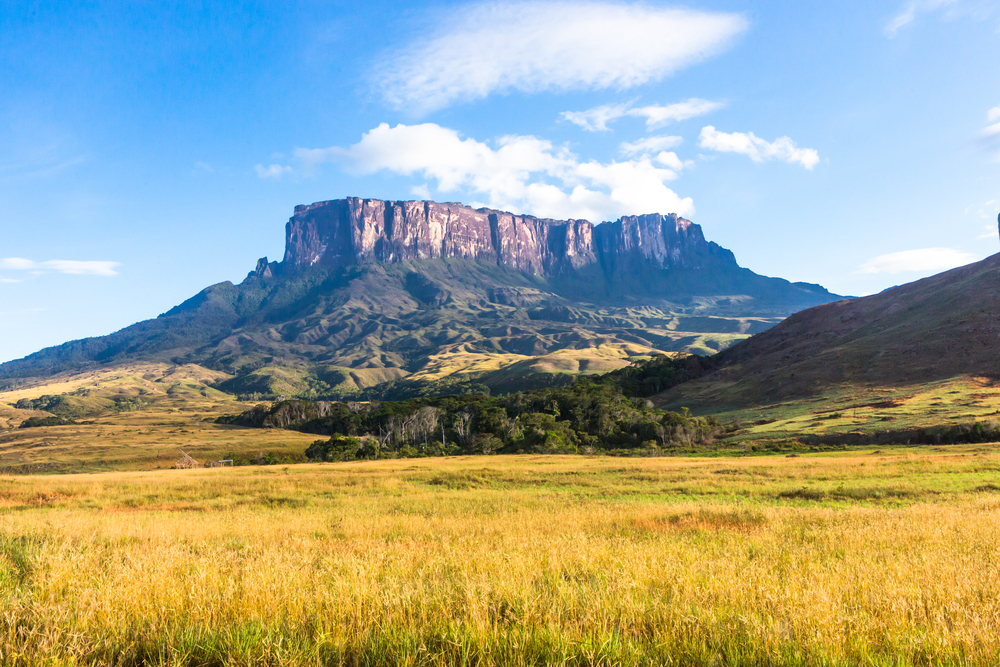
Landscape of the Mount Roraima National Park

=== Climate ===
Köppen climate types of Roraima

According to the Köppen-Geiger climate classification, the prevailing climate in Roraima is similar to that of other states in the North Region that shelter the Amazon rainforest: basic variations of the tropical climate. The average temperature during the year varies from 20 °C (68 °F) in points of relief with higher altitudes, to 38 °C (100 °F) in areas of smooth or flat relief.

The rainfall index in the eastern part is about 2000 millimetres. In the western part, it is approximately 1500 millimetres. In the capital and nearby areas, the indexes reach 2600 millimetres.

In general, the climate varies according to the region. The south and west of the state have a tropical rainforest climate (Af). The average annual temperature ranges from 25 to 28 °C (77 to 82 °F). In the north and east, the prevailing climates are the tropical monsoon climate (Am) and tropical savanna climate (Aw), where the average temperature is similar to the other regions of the state, however the rainfall index is lower, and the dry season is well defined.

Despite the latitude, in the extreme northwest and northeast, in the highest areas of the state, it is possible to find climatic patterns compatible with those of humid subtropical climates (Cfa and Cwa), as in the region around Mount Roraima, which has an annual average temperature between 20 and 22 °C (68 and 72 °F), and a dry season between December and March.

=== Hydrography ===
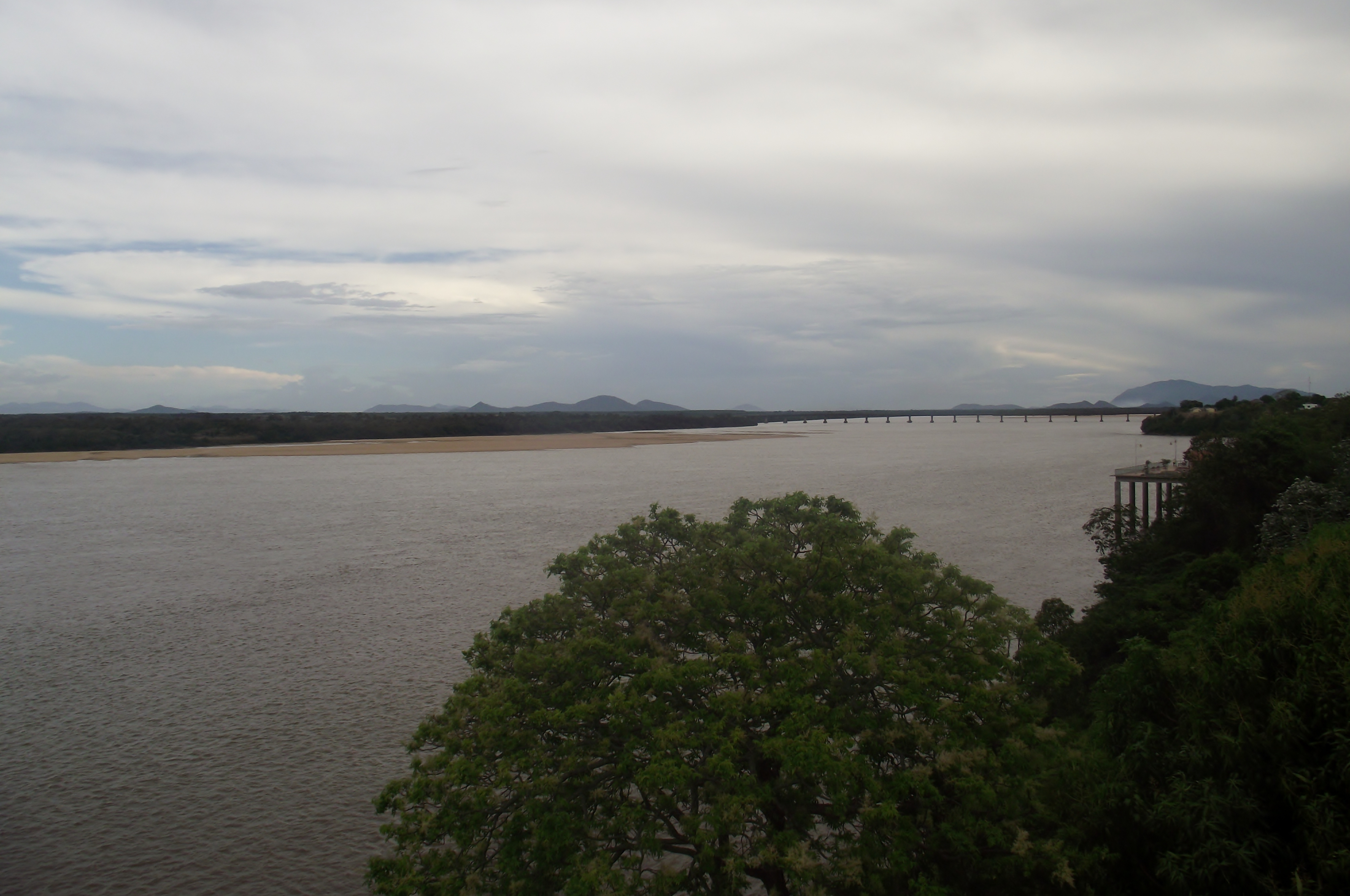
Branco River, near Boa Vista

The state of Roraima has extensive hydrography. Its territory is abundantly irrigated by 14 rivers, being these: Água Boa do Univiní, Ailã, Ajarani, Alalaú, Branco, Catrimani, Cauamé, Itapará, Mucajaí, Surumu, Takutu, Uraricoera, Urubu and Xeruini.

The hydrography of Roraima is part of the Amazon River basin and is basically based on the Branco River sub-basin of 45,530 km^{2} (17,600 square miles), the largest and most important in the state. This river is one of the tributaries of the Negro River.

Most of the rivers in the region have a large number of beaches in the summer, ideal for tourism and leisure. Besides, there are rapids rivers located in the north of the state, which are an option for water sports, such as canoeing. Almost all water sources in the state originate within its territory, except for two rivers with springs in Guyana. All Roraiman rivers flow into the Amazon Basin.

=== Fauna and flora ===
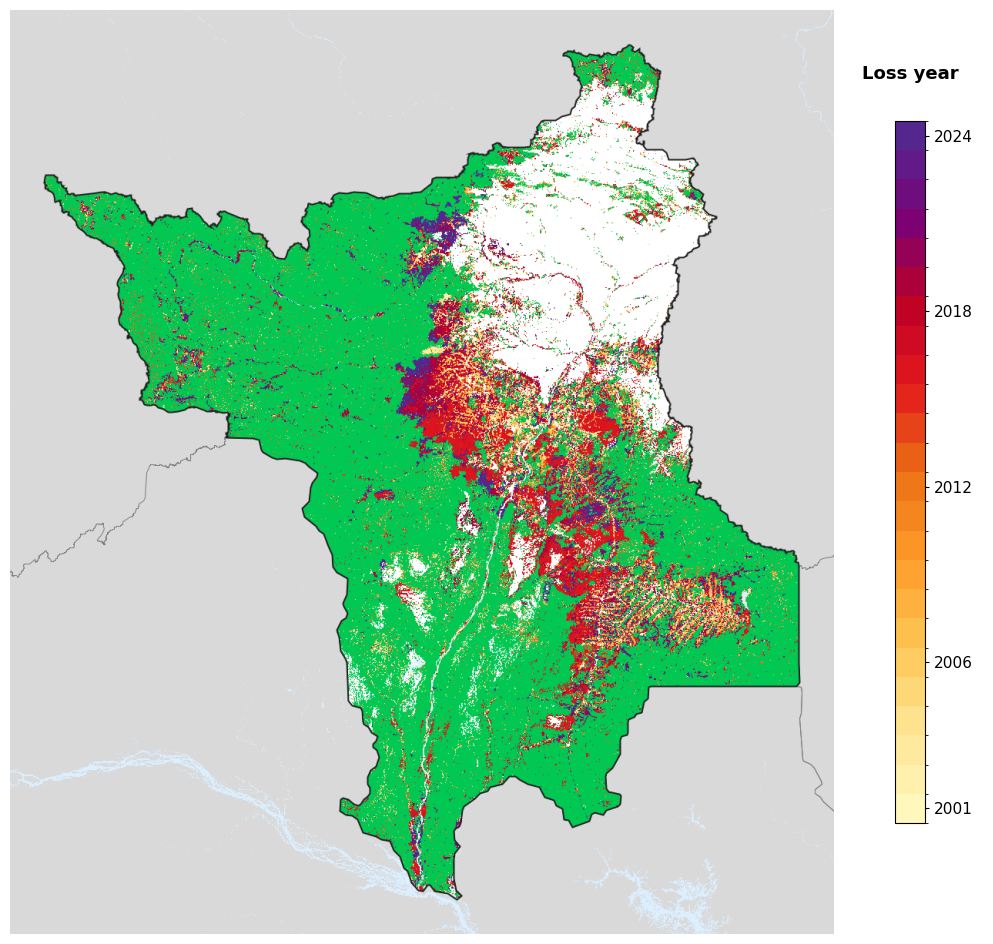
Tree-cover loss year in Roraima, 2001-2024, from the Global Forest Change dataset.

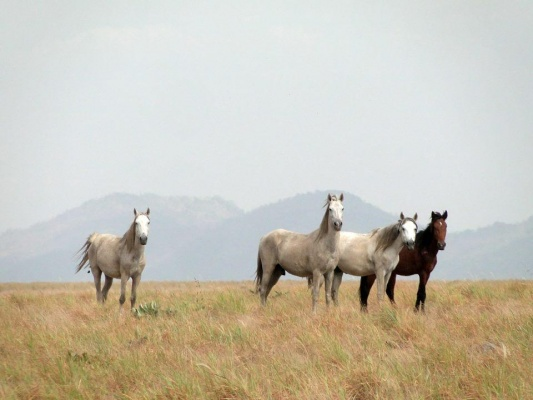
Lavradeiros (feral horses) near Amajari, Roraima. Northern Roraima feral horses are among the last feral horse populations in the world.

The diversity of landscapes and biomes in Roraima contributes to the formation of the fauna in Roraima. In the Roraiman Amazon rainforest region, animals such as jaguars, tapirs, peccaries, alligators, margay cats, otters, deers, monkeys, and other species are found.

In the general fields of the Branco River and the savannas, there are anteaters, armadillos, tortoises, pampas deer, pacas, agouti, several species of snakes and other species. Among many species, the feral horses stand out, they are called cavalos lavradeiros (in English: savannah horses or steppe horses), one of the last populations of wild horses in the world. In the Branco River basin, where most fish species are found, the variety of species is large. Among the main fish are the pacu, peacock bass, surubi, matrinxã, redtail catfish, tambaqui, acará, mandi, cachorra, piranha, traíra, piraíba, arowana and many other species.

On the beaches of the lower Branco River, it is still possible to find species of turtles, such as the yellow-spotted river turtle. There are many species of birds in the state, from large to small ones. Among the large ones, the passarão (literally big bird) and the jabiru stand out. Among the small ones, guans, herons, crested caracara and others stand out.

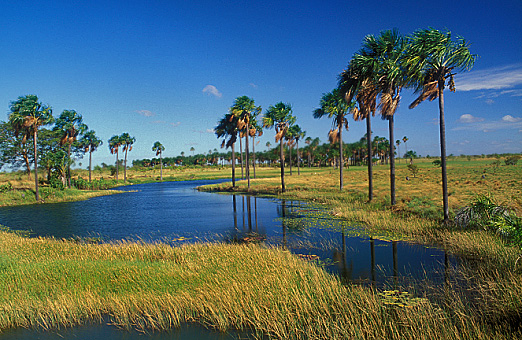
Buritizeiros in Roraima

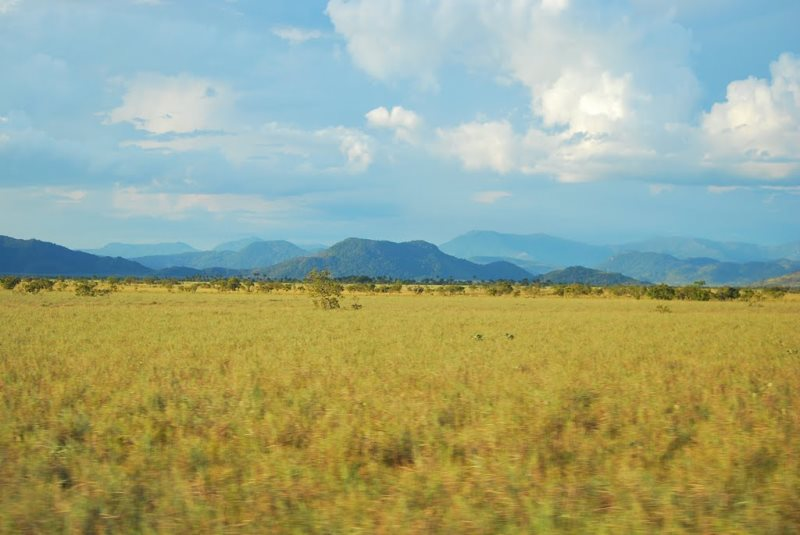
Lavrado region

In Roraima, the flora is divided into three regions:

- Amazon rainforest (Floresta tropical amazônica): composed of dense and humid forest typical of the lower Branco River, extending through the southwest region.
- General fields of the Branco River (Campos Gerais do Rio Branco): approximately 44,000 km^{2} (17,000 sq mi), also known as the lavrado region. Lavrado is also known as the savannah. Formed by grass-plot, but along the watercourses, called igarapés, there are large palm trees known as buritizeiros. In the lavrado there are also, in great quantity, bushes, paricaranas and muricizeiros.
- Mountainous region (Região Serrana): with typical mountainous vegetation, thinner trees and valleys rich in humus with good-quality grass for livestock.

In any of the regions, there are three different types of vegetation cover taking into account the river banks. These are:

- Mainland forests (Matas de terra firme): comprising forests located in lands never affected by river floods.
- Floodplain forests (Matas de várzeas): these are the forests that cover the lands affected by the floods of rivers.
- Riparian forests (Matas ciliares): these are preserved by law and are also flooded every year by river floods.

== Demography ==
Historical population
Year	Pop.	±%
1950	18,116	—
1960	29,489	+62.8%
1970	41,638	+41.2%
1980	82,018	+97.0%
1991	215,950	+163.3%
2000	324,397	+50.2%
2010	450,479	+38.9%
2022	636,707	+41.3%

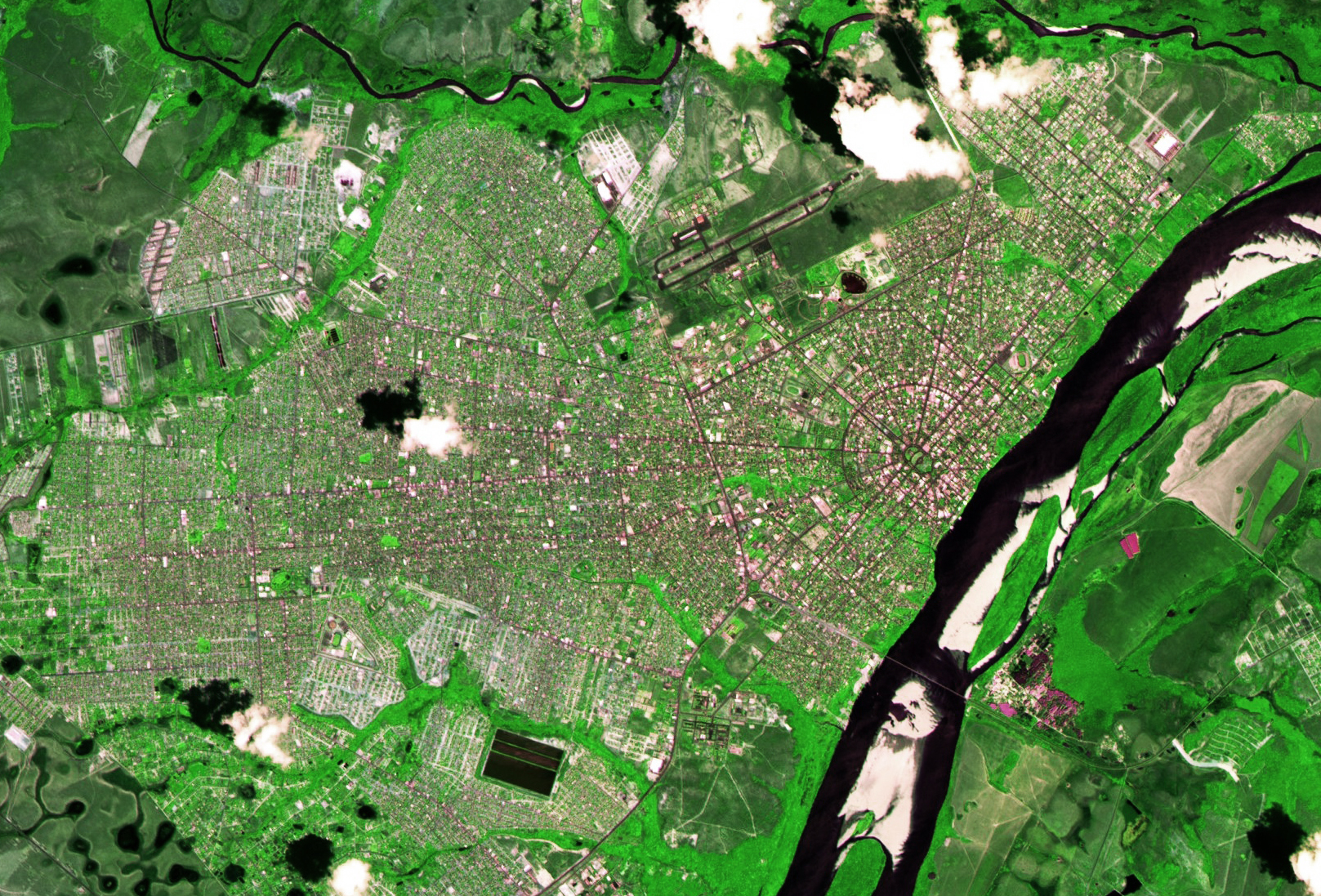
Satellite image of Boa Vista, capital of Roraima, in 2017

Population density in Roraima in the 2010 census. > 25/km^{2} 1 – 25/km^{2} 0 – 1/km^{2}

According to the population estimate of 2020 carried out by the Brazilian Institute of Geography and Statistics (IBGE), Roraima had a population of 631,181 inhabitants, which makes the state the least populous federative unit in Brazil. The capital, Boa Vista, concentrates 66.4% of the state's population. The population of Roraima has almost doubled in twenty years. In 1991, the state had only 217,583 inhabitants, a significant increase of 95.51% in population growth. The municipalities that showed the highest population growth were Boa Vista, the capital, and Rorainópolis. As for the annual population growth in Roraima, the state ranks among the fastest-growing in Brazil, with a rate of 4.6%, much higher than the national average of 1.6% growth. In this regard, it is second only to Amapá, which registers more than 5% annual growth. However, this high population growth has been declining in recent years. An example of this is the rate presented in 2000 when Roraima showed 49.09% of population growth with 1991. In the last census, in 2010, that number dropped to 31.13%. Of the total population of the state in 2010, 229,343 inhabitants are men and 221,884 inhabitants are women. In recent years, the growth of the urban population has intensified significantly, exceeding the total rural population. According to the 2000 estimate, 80.3% of the inhabitants lived in cities.

The population density was 1.8 inhab./km^{2} in 2006. This mark is lower than the Brazilian density, 19.94 inhab./km^{2}. The distribution of the state population is uneven, with a greater concentration in the capital region and the south of the state. Five municipalities – Boa Vista, Rorainópolis, Alto Alegre, Caracaraí and Bonfim – concentrate more than half of the population of Roraima.

In 2017, the Human Development Index (HDI) of Roraima was 0.752, considered high and placing the state in 12th position among the 26 states in Brazil.

† Region seat
†† State capital and region seat

Municipalities in Roraima by population in 2020
Rank	Municipality	Immediate region	Population (2020)	Percentage of total population
1	Boa Vista ††	Boa Vista	419,652	66.4%
2	Rorainópolis †	Rorainópolis	30,782	4.8%
3	Caracaraí †	Caracaraí	22,283	3.5%
4	Pacaraima †	Pacaraima	18,913	2.9%
5	Cantá	Boa Vista	18,799	2.9%
6	Mucajaí	Boa Vista	18,172	2.8%
7	Alto Alegre	Boa Vista	15,380	2.4%
8	Amajari	Pacaraima	13,185	2.0%
9	Bonfim	Boa Vista	12,557	1.9%
10	Iracema	Caracaraí	12,296	1.9%
11	Normandia	Pacaraima	11,532	1.8%
12	Uiramutã	Pacaraima	10,789	1.7%
13	Caroebe	Rorainópolis	10,383	1.6%
14	São João da Baliza	Rorainópolis	8,348	1.3%
15	São Luiz	Rorainópolis	8,110	1.2%

=== Ethnicity ===
Ethnicities of Roraima in 2022
1. Pardo (mixed-race) (57.3%)
2. White (20.7%)
3. Indigenous (14.1%)
4. Black (7.70%)
5. Asian (0.10%)

Cultural, political and economic traits inherited from the Portuguese, Spanish and Dutch are influential in Roraima. Also, the importance of the indigenous peoples in terms of ethnic contribution cannot be forgotten. It was the indigenous people who initiated human occupation in the Amazon region, and their descendants, the caboclos, developed in close contact with the environment, adapting to the regional peculiarities and opportunities offered by the forest.

In its historical formation, the Roraiman demography is the result of the miscegenation of the three basic ethnic groups that make up the population in the state: the Indigenous, the Europeans and the Africans, thus forming the mestizos of the region (caboclos). Later, with the arrival of migrants, especially from the Northeast of Brazil, a "broth" of singular culture was formed, which characterizes a large part of the population, its values and way of life.

According to the 2022 census, the total population of Roraima was composed of Pardos (mixed-race, 57.3%), Whites (20.7%), Indigenous (14.1%), Afro-Brazilians (7.7%) and Asians (0.1%). Roraima also recognizes mestizo identity. Mestizo Day (27 June) is an official date in the state.

Roraima is home to the largest proportional Indigenous community in Brazil, and also the largest proportional Morena community, behind only the Federal District, which is not a state; therefore, Roraima leads among the states regarding the Morena population. In 2025, 41.54% of Roraima's population is Morena, 33.4% is White, 13.85% is Indigenous, 7.83% is Black, 3.19% is Multiracial (Mulata), and 0.19% is Asian.

=== Religion ===
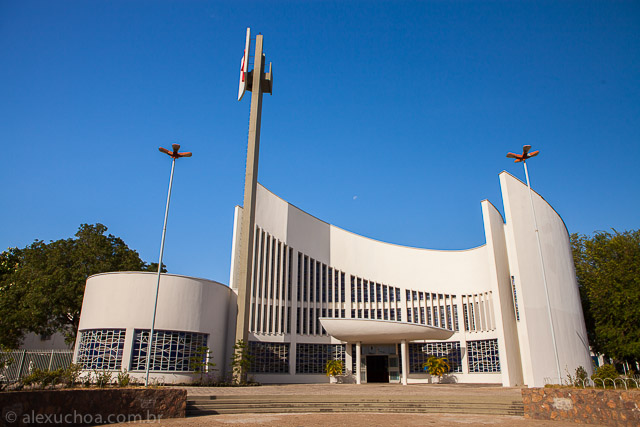
Christ the Redeemer Cathedral

According to data from 2010, from the Brazilian Institute of Geography and Statistics (IBGE), the main religious denominations of Roraima were: Catholicism (50.5%), Protestantism (30.3%), no religion (12.98%), Indigenous religions (2.75%), Spiritism (0.91%), Buddhism (0.13%), Candomblé (0.08%), Esoteric traditions (0.03%), Judaism and Islam (0.03% each), Umbanda (0.02%) and Hinduism (0.01%). The Roman Catholic Diocese of Roraima with 22 parishes under Bishop Evaristo Pascoal Spengler (2023), a suffragan diocese of the Archdiocese of Manaus, is the only Catholic diocese in the state of Roraima. It belongs to the Ecclesiastical Province of Manaus and the Northern Regional Episcopal Council of the National Conference of Bishops of Brazil. The episcopal see is in the Cristo Redentor Cathedral, in the city of Boa Vista. In addition to the majority Catholic Church, there are dozens of different Protestant denominations in the state. In recent years, Eastern religions, Mormonism and evangelical denominations have grown considerably in the state. Among the Christian restorationist denominations, Jehovah's Witnesses (0.55%) and the Church of Jesus Christ of Latter-day Saints (0.15%) stand out. Among the new Eastern religions, the Church of World Messianity stands out (0.06%). Other beliefs are shared by 1.47% of the population.

=== Education ===
In 2009, the state had a network of 585 elementary schools, of which 322 are state schools, 252 municipal, 10 private and 1 federal public school. The teaching staff consisted of 4,842 teachers, of whom 2,952 worked in state public schools, 1,627 in municipal public schools and 217 in private schools. 86,547 students studied in these schools, of which 82,208 in public schools and 4,339 in private schools. High school was given in 100 establishments, with an enrollment of 17,512 students. Of the 17,512 students, 16,175 were in public schools and 1,337 in private schools.

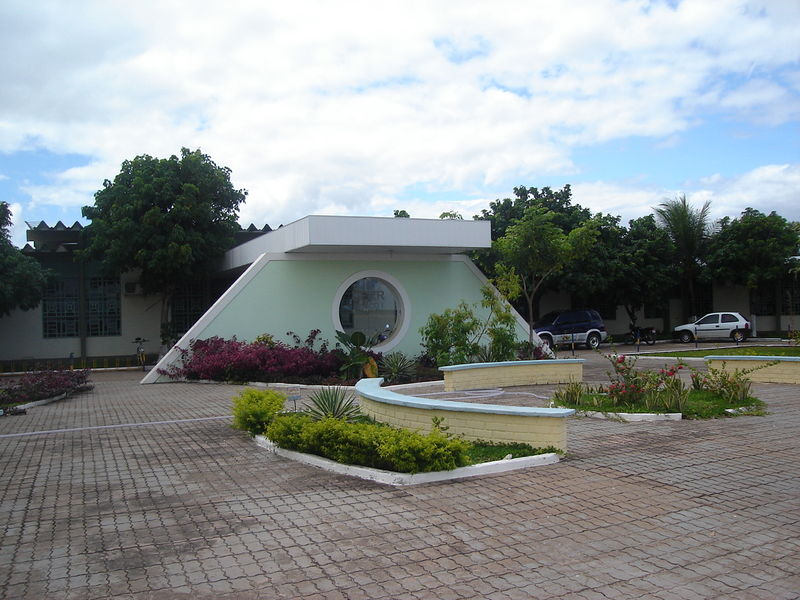
Block I of the Federal University of Roraima (UFRR), on the Paricarana campus

As for higher education, the Federal University of Roraima (UFRR), the State University of Roraima (UERR) and the Federal Institute of Roraima (IFRR) stand out. There are also private Higher Education establishments: Roraiman College of Higher Education (FARES), Estácio Atual College, Cathedral College and Faculty of Sciences, Education and Theology of Northern Brazil (FACETEN).

About 14,500 pre-school students were also registered, divided into 270 teaching units. Of these, 258 were municipal, with none at the state level. There were 857 pre-school teachers in the state.

In 2019 the illiteracy rate in the state was 5%, placing Roraima in the 7th position among the states of Brazil with the highest percentage of literate population, ahead of all states in the North and Northeast regions. In 2019, in the Basic Education Development Index (IDEB), the state reached a score of 5.7 points, being higher than the national average and becoming the 15th position among the Brazilian states.

In 2011, the average grade of Roraima in the National High School Exam (ENEM) is 35.03 in the objective test and 56.37 in the essay test, being one of the highest scores in the North-Northeast of Brazil. In these two regions, Roraima lost only to Amazonas (57.77). However, even with the second highest score, the Roraiman average was below the national average, which was 57.26. Regarding the number of students, 7,463 participated in ENEM in 2010, of which 2,404 were high school graduates and 4,493 graduates. 85.52% of the total students came from public schools.

A survey carried out by Portal G1 identified Roraima as one of the Brazilian states that best remunerates middle school teachers, with an average salary of R$ 2,099.47 for 25 hours per week. According to the survey, the highest salary in the country, in the Federal District – in the amount of R $3,121.96 – was related to a workload of 40 hours. In the same year, the NGO Todos pela Educação also mentioned Roraima as the second Brazilian state with the highest investment in basic education students per year, with R$4,834.43, for each student.

=== Health care ===
Child mortality	20.1 per thousand births
Doctors	8.3 per 10,000 inhab. (2005)
Hospital beds	1.6 per thousand inhab. (2005)

In 2005, there were 455 hospital establishments in the state, with 725 beds and 56 doctors, 10 graduated nurses and 60 nursing assistants. In 2010, of the 455 existing hospitals, 378 were for adults and children, 22 were exclusively for children, being 49 general and 3 specialized. In 2005, 85.2% of the population of Roraima had access to the water network, while 75% benefited from the sanitary sewage network.

According to the 2010 Brazilian Census, 81.4% of the population of Roraima rated their health as good or excellent; 72.5% of the population regularly undergo medical consultations; 44.9% of the inhabitants consulted the dentist regularly and 7.4% of the population has been hospitalized in the last twelve months. Approximately 22% of the inhabitants declared to have a chronic disease and only 9.8% have health insurance. Another significant fact is the fact that 44.7% of the inhabitants declare that they always need the Family Health Unit Program (PUSF).

Regarding women's health, 30.5% of women over 40 years old had a clinical breast exam in the last twelve months; 39.1% of women between 50 and 69 years old had a mammogram in the last twenty-four months, and 85.6% of women between 25 and 59 years old had a preventive exam for cervical cancer in the last thirty-six months.

== Economy ==
Agricultural production in Roraima (2006)
Crop	Amount (t)
Coffee	24,000
Maize	15,740
Banana	13,415
Soybean	11,005
Cassava	8,745
Orange	467
Sugar cane	373
Bean	82

With a Gross Domestic Product (GDP) of only R$ 13,37 billion, the economy of the state of Roraima is the smallest in Brazil, corresponding to only 0.2% of Brazil's economy. It is based on agricultural production, mainly in grain agribusiness, with emphasis on rice, soybeans and corn. It is said that the state works in the so-called "paycheck economy", when there is a circulation mainly of the amounts paid in salaries to public servants and private employees of commerce.

In livestock, the live cattle trade for slaughter in Manaus was, until the 1970s, the main economic base. For years, between 6 and 10 thousand oxen were traded with Manaus annually. This type of trade brought foodstuffs, clothing, household items, among others, to Roraima. This form of supply ended due to two main factors: population growth in the state, through the inauguration of the Manaus–Boa Vista Road, and the decrease in the cattle herd.

Rice took the place of meat, starting to be traded with Manaus in the late 1970s. In 1977, agricultural mechanization for rice crop was introduced, increasing production capacity. In the beginning, mechanization was applied in the area of plowing for the production of upland rice, which did not have the success expected by several factors. One of them was the lack of physical structure for storing production, as there were no dryers and warehouses. However, this system made it possible to shift production to irrigated rice. With more capitalized producers and government support in the construction of warehouses and dryers, production became viable. This type of rice came to be produced in the floodplains of the Branco, Takutu, Uraricoera and Cauamé rivers, with productivity high enough to cover the high costs of implanting and maintaining this crop in Roraima.

Subsequently, the cultivation of soybeans appeared in the plowing, with the planted area being increased year by year. The biggest problems of this crop are in the area of guaranteeing land tenure, its incompatibilities with environmental laws, in addition to irregularity and poor reliability of transport. These two largest crops in Roraima decreased with the conquest by the peoples from the Demarcation of the Raposa Serra do Sol Indigenous Area.

Other crops such as corn, cassava and beans are also present. But they do not reach the level of rice and soy production. In the case of manioc for the production of flour, Roraima is self-sufficient. In the area of fruit growing, pineapple, orange, banana, papaya, melon, watermelon, grape, lemon, passion fruit and tangerine are produced in the state. The melon, watermelon and papaya stand out for their quality recognition. There has been great progress with vegetables in recent years. The production of lettuce, green onions, parsley, peppers, sweet potatoes, string beans, pumpkin, cabbage and sweet pepper have increased, and it can be said that there is also self-sufficiency in this sector. Greenhouse production has helped in this process.

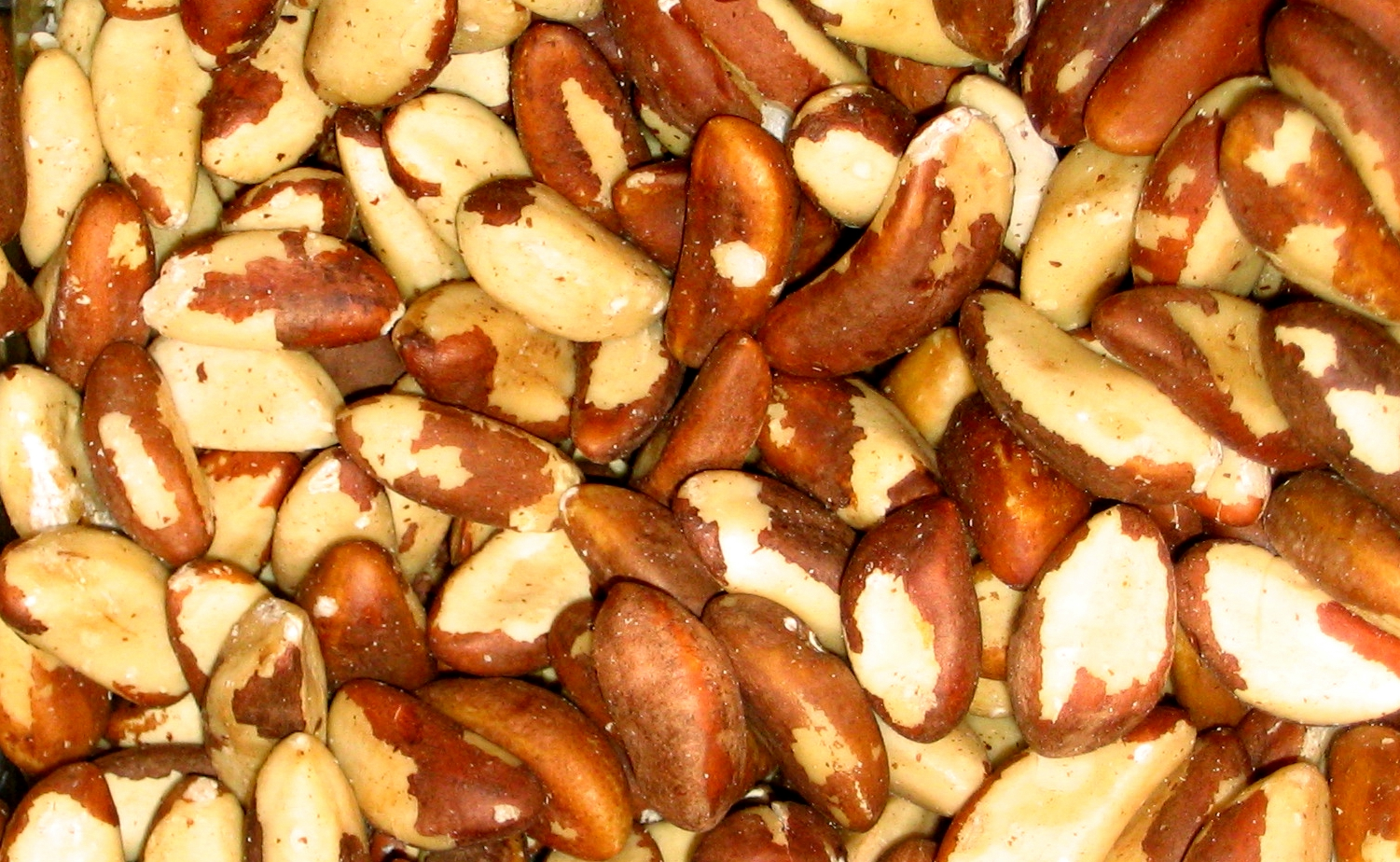
Brazil nuts after shell removal

Roraima has always occupied a secondary position in the economic geography of the Amazon when it comes to plant extractivism, producing Brazil nuts, rowanberries and wood. The first two in the southern region of the state, especially under the Branco River. They are sold in Manaus, but on a small scale. The wood has been explored and traded with Venezuela and, more recently, with other countries in Europe and Asia.

The Roraiman industry is small. In the Industrial District of Boa Vista, located on the edge of the BR-174, there were 58 plants in operation in 2015. They produce cereals, wood, leather, and others. The commercial sector is traditional, buying from other places, such as São Paulo and Manaus, and reselling in Boa Vista and other municipalities.

Getting closer commercially with neighboring countries to practice foreign trade is a path that has been recently traced. The main trading partner for exports and imports is Venezuela; the main product exported in 2004 and 2010 was wood; in 2015, there was a good diversification with the export of soy, leather and mineral water, in addition to wood. The products imported in greater quantity have been machines, devices and mechanical instruments. The municipalities that export the most are Boa Vista, Bonfim, Caracaraí, Mucajaí and Rorainópolis.

== Politics ==
Flag of Roraima, a state symbol

Roraima is a state of Brazil governed by three powers, the executive, represented by the governor, the legislative, represented by the Legislative Assembly of the State of Roraima, and the judiciary, represented by the Court of Justice of the State of Roraima and other courts and judges. Popular participation in government decisions through referendums is also allowed. The current constitution of the state of Roraima was enacted on 31 December 1991, in addition to the changes resulting from subsequent constitutional amendments.

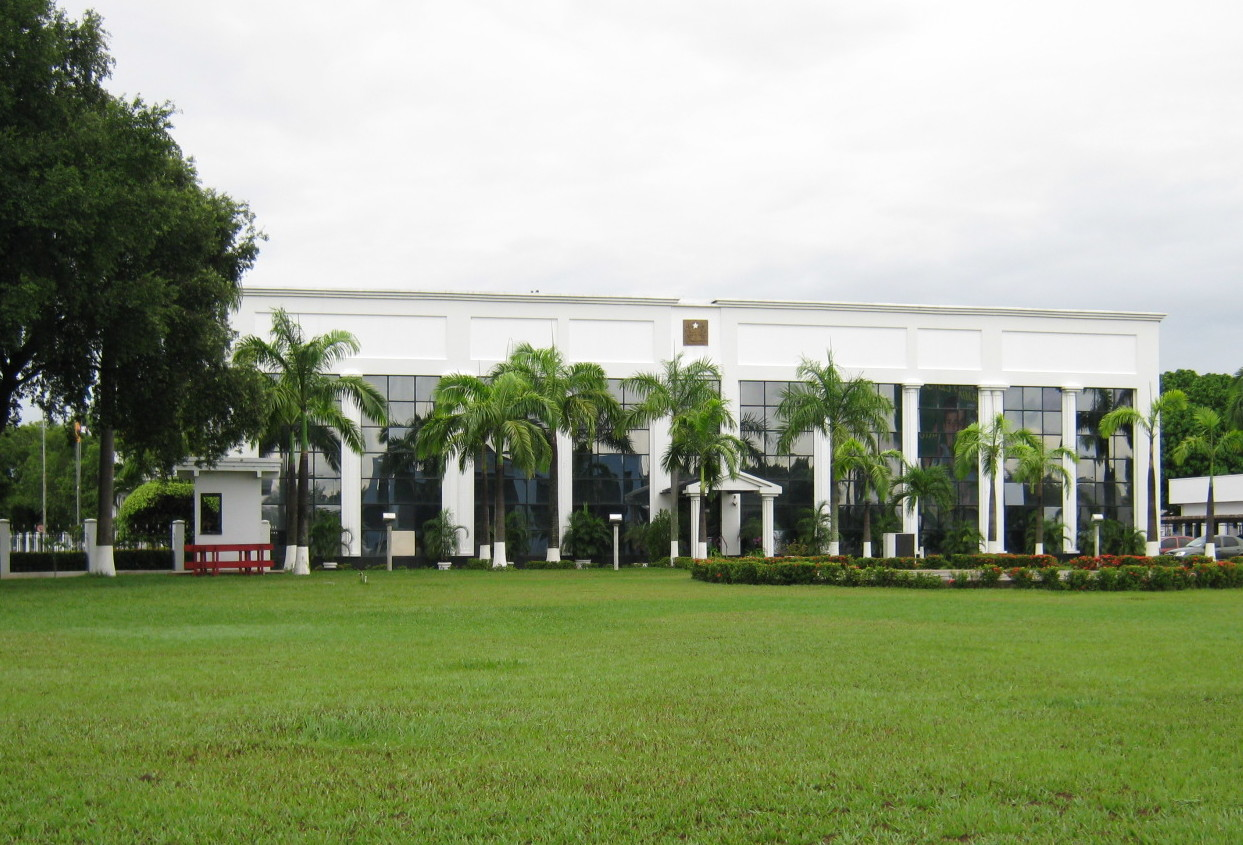
Senador Hélio Campos Palace, the seat of the state government

The Roraima Executive Branch is centered on the state governor, who is elected by universal suffrage and direct and secret vote, by the population for terms of up to four years in duration, and can be reelected for another term. The Senador Hélio Campos Palace is the seat of the Roraima government since 1991.

The Legislative Power of Roraima is unicameral, constituted by the Legislative Assembly of the State of Roraima. It consists of 24 deputies, who are elected every 4 years. In the National Congress, the representation of Roraima is made up of 3 senators and 8 federal deputies. The highest court of the Roraima Judiciary is the Court of Justice of the State of Roraima. The judiciary is made up of judges and judges of law.

When it comes to political representation organizations, 34 of the 35 Brazilian political parties have representation in the state. According to information released by the Superior Electoral Court (TSE), based on data from April 2016, the political party with the largest number of affiliates in Roraima is the Progressive Republican Party (PRP), with 6,732 members, followed by the Social Democracy Party (PSDB), with 5,356 members and the Democratic Labor Party (PDT), with 5,087 members. Other political parties in the state, by number of members, are the Progressive Party (PP), with 4,521 members; and the Workers' Party (PTB), with 3,406 members. Also according to the Superior Electoral Court, the Sustainability Network (REDE) and the Unified Socialist Workers Party (PSTU) are the least representative political parties in Roraima, with 21 and 24 members, respectively. The New Party (NOVO) is the only Brazilian party that has no representation in Roraima.

=== Subdivisions ===
Roraima is politically divided into 15 municipalities. The most populous of them is Boa Vista, with 419,652 inhabitants, being the oldest municipality in the state, emerged as a village, the first with urban characteristics in Roraima. The municipalities are distributed in four immediate geographical regions, which in turn are grouped into two intermediate geographical regions, according to the division of the Brazilian Institute of Geography and Statistics (IBGE) in force since 2017.

== Transportation ==
=== Airways ===
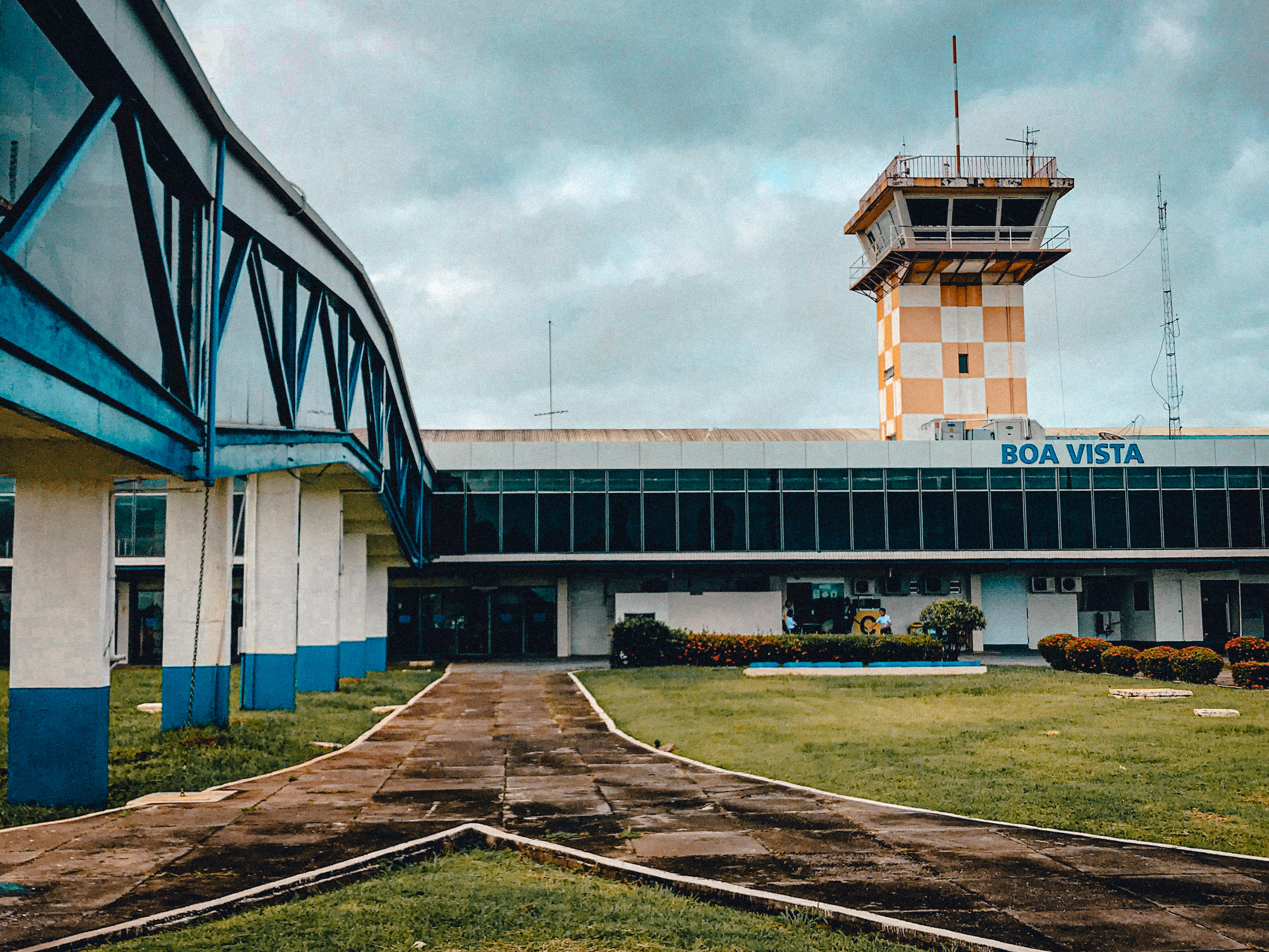
Boarding gate of Boa Vista International Airport

In the state, there is only one international airport managed by Infraero, Boa Vista International Airport - Atlas Brasil Cantanhede, located in the state capital. In 2009, the airport in the state capital handled 190,469 passengers and 931,248 air cargo. The state also has 7 other state-class and smaller airports: Auaris Airport, in Amajari; Mucajaí Airport, in Mucajaí; Pacaraima Airport, in Pacaraima; Surucucu, Uaicas and Surucucus Airport, in Alto Alegre, the latter located inside the Yanomami Indigenous Territory; and Caracaraí Airport, in Caracaraí. These airports are of municipal and state administration.

Air transport is the fastest to regulate in Roraima, being in better conditions than the others. The cities, districts and towns of the inland of Roraima are served, in most cases, by transport from Boa Vista. That said, it is the most isolated federative unit in Brazil. There is no rail network in the state.

=== Highways ===
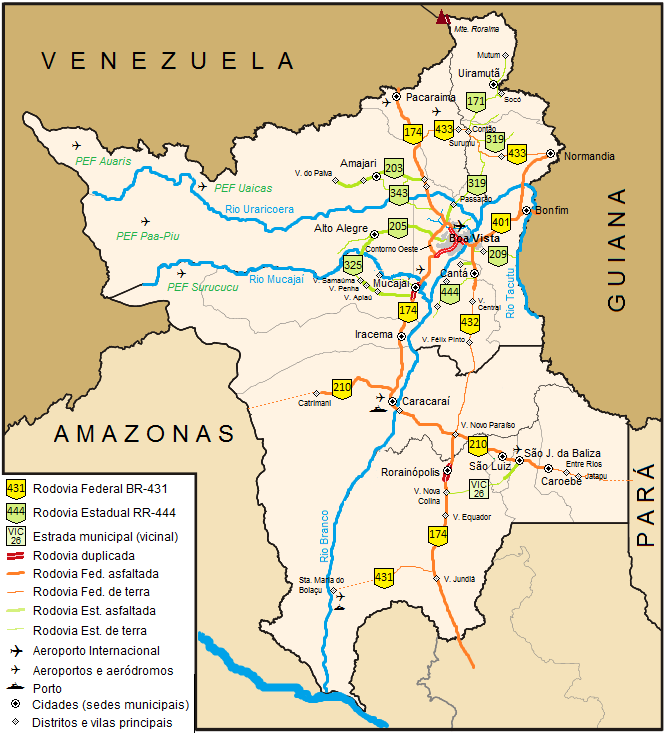
Road map of Roraima

The only Brazilian state that has a road connection with Roraima is Amazonas, through the BR-174, which connects the municipalities in the South to the municipalities in the North of the state, and is also responsible for connecting Brazil to Venezuela. The BR-174 is 992 kilometres (600 mi) long and crosses the territory of the state from south to north, crossing the Branco River at the height of Caracaraí through the Caracaraí Bridge.

There is also the BR-210, also called Perimetral Norte, a project originating in the mid-twentieth century, from the Federal Government, which had been carried out only partially and which, in principle, would link the state to Pará, Amapá and the municipality of São Gabriel da Cachoeira (in Amazonas). This highway is 481 kilometres (300 mi) long and crosses the state in an east–west direction. Another highway in Roraima that crosses Brazil is the BR-401, connecting the state with Guyana. It starts in Boa Vista and crosses the Branco River through the Macuxis' Bridge, entering the Guyanese territory. Other federal highways are BR-431, BR-432 and BR-433. Federal roads in Roraima add up to 1,638 kilometres (1,000 mi).

There are state highways as well, including the RR-205 (which connects the capital to the headquarters of Alto Alegre) and the RR-203 (connecting the headquarters and districts of Amajari to the BR-174), both of which are fully paved, signposted, and with good traffic conditions. Other important highways are the RR-325 and the RR-319, which cut through important agricultural areas and colonies of rural settlements. State highways add up to just over 2,000 kilometres (1,200 mi) in length and are largely in conditions of improper use.

=== Waterways ===
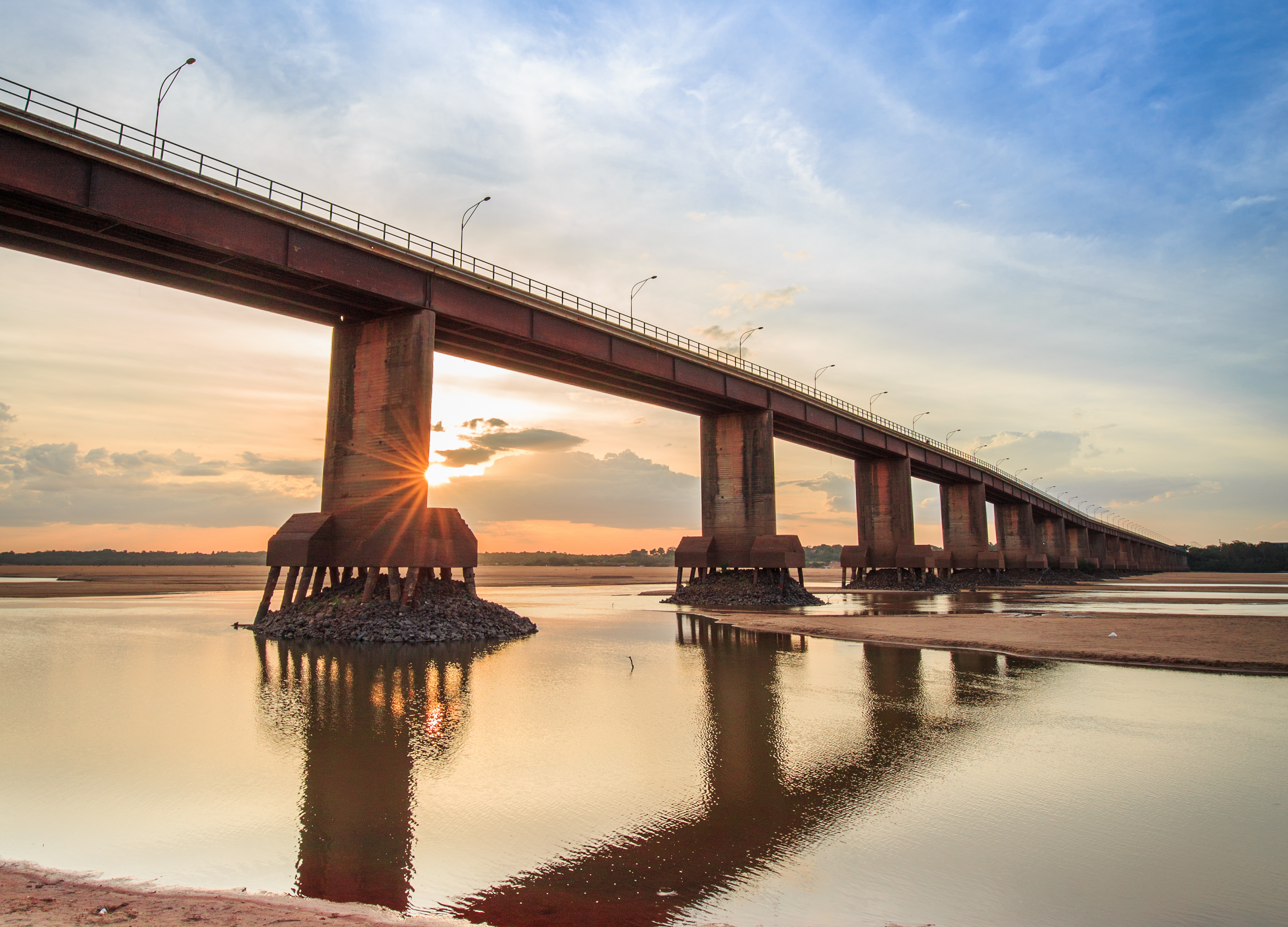
The Macuxis' Bridge crossing the Branco River

River transport is also notable in the state, as well as in other states in the Amazon rainforest. However, river navigation is limited to the Branco River. Transportation on the Branco River is heavily used for the economy, but with little passenger movement to inland cities. Regular navigation on this river occurs only in the mouth section (Negro River/Caracaraí), about 440 kilometres (300 mi) long. In this segment, the Branco River has a maximum draft of 5 metres in the period of floods and a minimum of 0.7 metres in the period of drought. Roraima is at a disadvantage in relation to the other Amazonian states in terms of waterway system. As it is the only one in which all its notorious rivers have their source in their own territory – the state's hydrographic system is 100% Roraiman –, it is bound to have few river outlets. In fact, Roraima has only one major fluvial outlet: through the Branco river, reaching the Negro river, heading from there to Manaus and São Gabriel da Cachoeira. Even so, the most important river in Roraima still poses additional difficulties.

== Tourism ==
Roraima has great tourism potential, especially in ecotourism. Because it is located in the extreme north of Brazil, in the northern part of this country and because it borders on three South American countries, Roraima maintains close commercial relations based on tourism with these countries, especially Venezuela. Natural attractions are the main tourist points of the state, especially Mount Roraima. Mount Roraima is one of the oldest places on the planet and attracts many tourists from all over the world.

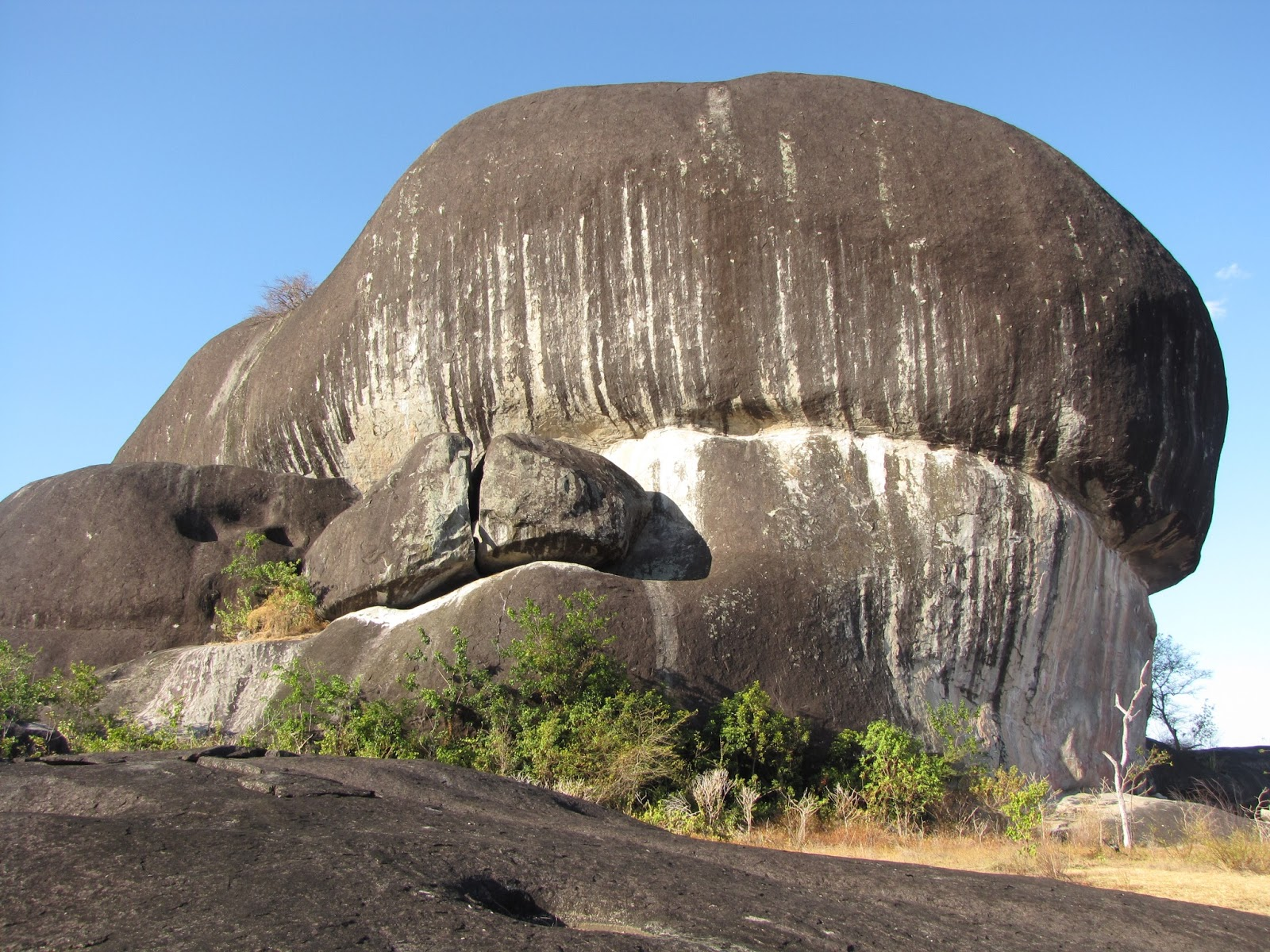
Pedra Pintada is a rock formation considered an archaeological site.

Archaeologists have a strong interest in Pedra Pintada, which is the most important site of archaeology in the state. In it, there are inscriptions of ancient civilizations, such as rock paintings, pieces of ceramics, hatchets, necklace beads, among other artifacts that indicate the history of human evolution, dating back to four thousand years. The rock is a granite monolith sixty metres in diameter and about 40 metres high. On the outer face, there are red rock paintings that are still considered an enigma for scientists. There are also funerary caves up to 12 meters long. Pedra Pintada is located in Pacaraima.

Serra do Tepequém is also a state tourist attraction. It has a rich handicraft in soapstone and its area is free to explore diamonds. The place serves as a trekking practice, to the Paiva, Sobral, Barata and Funil waterfalls. The plateau is the culmination of the entire mountain, where the mountain range that delimits the borders between Brazil and Venezuela begins. It has an average altitude of 1,500 metres and is located in the municipality of Amajari. Another tourist spot in the state is Mount Caburaí. Geographers have proven that it is located 70 km north of Oiapoque, Amapá, which makes the mountain the northernmost point in Brazil, having been recognized by the official institutions responsible for geographic territorial demarcations, such as the Ministry of Education and the Brazilian Institute of Geography and Statistics (IBGE).

Also noteworthy is Lake Caracaranã, in the municipality of Normandia. With almost 6 kilometres of perimeter, it is known for its fine sand beaches surrounded by cashew trees.

== Notable people ==
- Bianca Matte (b. 1990), beauty queen
- Thiago Maia (b. 1997), professional footballer.
- Lucas Barbosa (b. 1992), mixed martial artist, World Champion.
- Arthur Silva (b. 1995), footballer.
- Luiz Altamir Melo (b. 1996), swimmer, World Champion, former World Record holder.
- George Amaro, computer scientist known for connecting Roraima to the internet

== See also ==
- List of municipalities in Roraima
