= São João da Baliza =

Municipality of Roraima, Brazil

- Municipality
- Flag Coat of arms

- Location in Roraima state
- Coordinates: 0°57′3″N 59°54′39″W
- Country: Brazil
- Region: North
- State: Roraima

Government
  - Mayor: Marcelo Jorge (PROS)

Area
  - Total: 4,284 km^{2} (1,654 sq mi)

Population (2022)
  - Total: 8,858
  - Density: 2.068/km^{2} (5.355/sq mi)
- Time zone: UTC−4 (AMT)
- Website: sjb.rr.gov.br

São João da Baliza (Brazilian Portuguese pronunciation: [ˈsɐ̃w ʒuˈɐ̃w da baˈlizɐ]) is a municipality located in the southeast of the state of Roraima in Brazil. Its population is 8.858 (2022) and its area is 4,284 km^{2}. São João da Baliza was first settled in 1974 after the BR-210 highway made the area accessible. It was called São João, because three of the initial settlers were called João. Da Baliza refers to a stream near the town, Igarapé Baliza, which itself comes from the Portuguese word baliza, meaning a ranging rod. It gained this name when a surveyor lost a ranging rod near the stream during highway construction. It became an independent municipality in 1982.
