= Caracaraí =

Municipality of Roraima, Brazil

- Municipality
- Municipality of Caracaraí
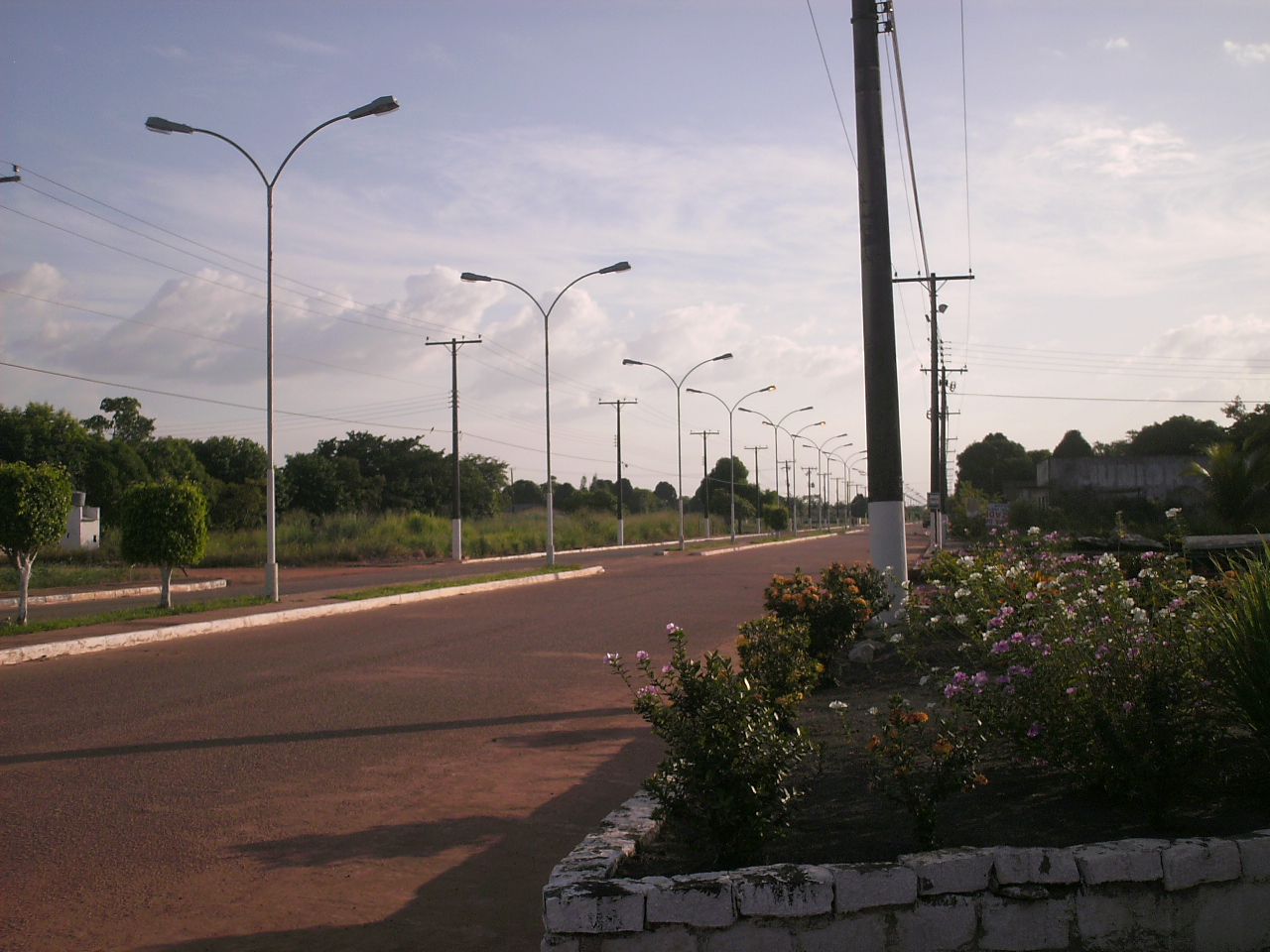
- An avenue in Caracaraí

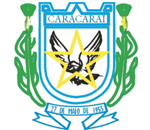
- Flag Coat of arms

- Location of Caracaraí in the State of Roraima
- Coordinates: 1.8119°N 61.1384°W
- Country: Brazil
- Region: North
- State: Roraima
- Founded: 1955

Government
  - Mayor: Dianiery Coelho (PP)

Area
  - Total: 47,411 km^{2} (18,305 sq mi)
- Elevation: 52 m (171 ft)

Population (2022)
  - Total: 20,957
  - Density: 0.44203/km^{2} (1.1448/sq mi)
- Time zone: UTC−4 (AMT)
- HDI (2000): 0.702 – medium
- Website: www.caracarai.rr.gov.br

Caracaraí (Brazilian Portuguese pronunciation: [kaɾɐkaɾaˈi]) is a municipality located in the state of Roraima in Brazil. Its population is 22,283 and its area is 47,411 square kilometres (18,305 sq mi), making it the largest municipality in Roraima state. Caracaraí is located on the Branco River.

== Overview ==
Caracaraí was founded by cattle ranchers from Moura. The town was originally known as Cidade Porto and was the capital of the Rio Branco Territory which was later renamed Roraima.

The word caracaraí means "little hawk", a very common bird in the region. Its territory cuts Roraima's in two and keeps boundaries with both the Brazilian state of Amazonas and the country of Guyana, though the Guyana portion it borders is disputed with Venezuela It is not the only municipality in the state to do so; Caroebe also borders both Amazonas and Guyana, and has boundaries with Pará as well.

Caracaraí is located near the intersection of the BR-174 and BR-210 highways. Caracaraí became an independent municipality in 1955. Between 1960 and 1982, the municipality contained the districts of Santa Maria do Boiaçu and São José de Anauá. Santa Maria do Boiaçu became part of the municipality of Rorainópolis.

The municipality contains the Caracaraí Ecological Station and the Niquiá Ecological Station.

The economy used to be based on cattle ranching. The cattle used to be shipped to Manaus. Caracaraí developed as a supply centre for the region, because it is located on the Branco River south of the waterfalls. It is the largest producer of fish in the state.

== Climate ==
Climate data for Caracaraí (1981–2010)
Month	Jan	Feb	Mar	Apr	May	Jun	Jul	Aug	Sep	Oct	Nov	Dec	Year
Mean daily maximum °C (°F)	32.6 (90.7)	33.0 (91.4)	33.3 (91.9)	32.7 (90.9)	31.0 (87.8)	30.9 (87.6)	31.1 (88.0)	32.3 (90.1)	33.4 (92.1)	34.2 (93.6)	33.8 (92.8)	32.8 (91.0)	32.6 (90.7)
Daily mean °C (°F)	27.0 (80.6)	27.3 (81.1)	27.6 (81.7)	27.2 (81.0)	26.2 (79.2)	26.0 (78.8)	25.8 (78.4)	26.5 (79.7)	27.4 (81.3)	28.0 (82.4)	27.8 (82.0)	27.1 (80.8)	27.0 (80.6)
Mean daily minimum °C (°F)	21.4 (70.5)	21.6 (70.9)	21.7 (71.1)	22.2 (72.0)	21.8 (71.2)	21.6 (70.9)	21.6 (70.9)	21.9 (71.4)	22.2 (72.0)	22.5 (72.5)	22.5 (72.5)	22.1 (71.8)	21.9 (71.4)
Average precipitation mm (inches)	64.9 (2.56)	50.9 (2.00)	93.4 (3.68)	196.1 (7.72)	321.1 (12.64)	336.1 (13.23)	296.1 (11.66)	216.7 (8.53)	150.7 (5.93)	100.8 (3.97)	89.6 (3.53)	84.7 (3.33)	2,001.1 (78.78)
Average precipitation days (≥ 1.0 mm)	7	6	7	14	21	21	22	18	12	8	6	9	151
Average relative humidity (%)	77.5	76.3	76.0	80.1	83.5	84.6	85.1	82.4	79.8	78.0	78.8	80.1	80.2
Mean monthly sunshine hours	200.3	166.7	177.6	147.4	128.0	124.7	159.6	187.8	204.5	218.3	215.9	198.2	2,129
Source: Instituto Nacional de Meteorologia
