= Cantá =

Municipality of Roraima, Brazil

- Municipality
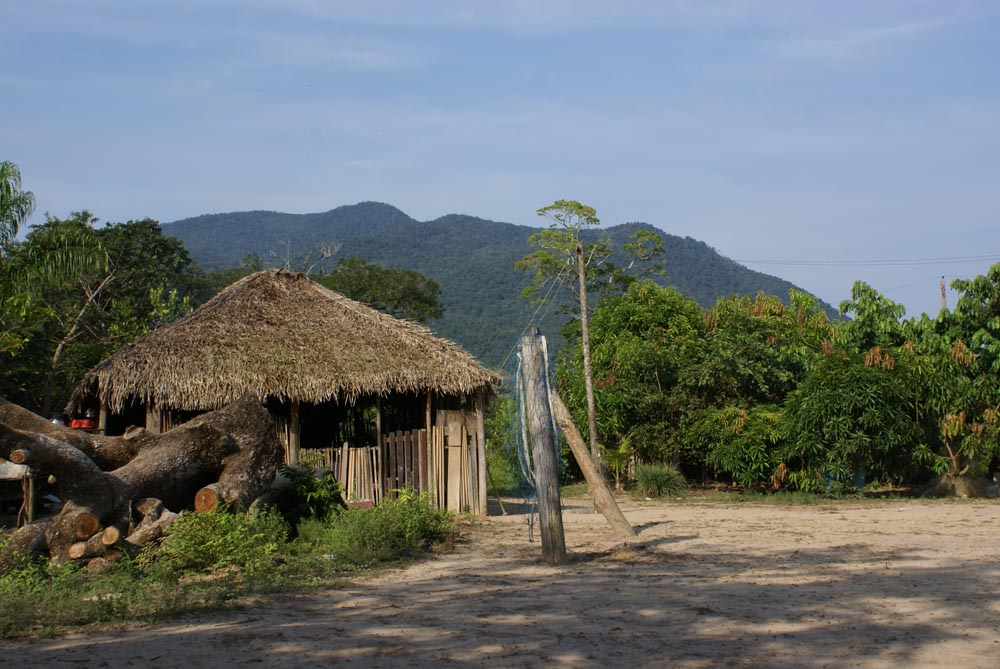
- Serra Grande in the background

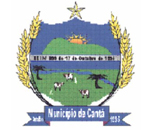
- Flag Coat of arms

- Location in Roraima state
- Coordinates: 2°36′36″N 60°35′49″W
- Country: Brazil
- Region: North
- State: Roraima

Area
  - Total: 7,665 km^{2} (2,959 sq mi)

Population (2022)
  - Total: 18,682
  - Density: 2.437/km^{2} (6.313/sq mi)
- Time zone: UTC−4 (AMT)
- Website: canta.rr.gov.br

Cantá (Portuguese pronunciation: [kɐ̃ˈta]) is a municipality located in the mideast of the state of Roraima in Brazil. Its population is 18,799 (2020) and its area is 7,665 km^{2}.

The municipality of Cantá was established in 1995. It is an agricultural community based on dairy production, livestock and bananas.

The municipality is known for its nature. Tourist attractions include the Serra Grande mountains, and the waterfalls of Véu de Noiva. Cantá can be reached from Boa Vista via the BR-432 highway.

The Malacacheta Indigenous Territory is located in the municipality. The 28,658 hectares (70,820 acres) territory is home to Wapishana Amerindians. The Tabalascada Indigenous Territory is shared by the Wapishana and the Macushi people, and measures 13,037 hectares (32,220 acres).
