= Caroebe =

Municipality of Roraima, Brazil

- Municipality
- Municipality of Caroebe
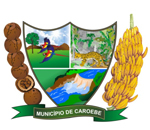
- Flag Coat of arms

- Location of Caroebe in the State of Roraima
- Coordinates: 00°53′02″N 59°41′45″W
- Country: Brazil
- Region: North
- State: Roraima
- Founded: 4 November 1994

Government
  - Mayor: Argilson Raimundo Pereira Martins (PSDB)

Area
  - Total: 12,066 km^{2} (4,659 sq mi)
- Elevation: 135 m (443 ft)

Population (2022)
  - Total: 10,656
  - Density: 0.48/km^{2} (1.2/sq mi)
- Time zone: UTC−4 (AMT)
- HDI (2000): 0.661 – medium
- Website: caroebe.rr.gov.br

Caroebe (Brazilian Portuguese pronunciation: [kaɾoˈɛbi]) is a municipality located in the southeast of the state of Roraima in Brazil. Its population is 10,656 (as of 2022) and its area is 12,066 km^{2}. It is the easternmost municipality in Roraima and the only one to border the state of Pará. Careoebe became an independent municipality in 1994.

== Climate ==
Caroebe has a tropical rainforest climate (Af) with moderate rainfall from September to March and heavy rainfall from April to August.

Climate data for Caroebe
Month	Jan	Feb	Mar	Apr	May	Jun	Jul	Aug	Sep	Oct	Nov	Dec	Year
Mean daily maximum °C (°F)	31.8 (89.2)	31.5 (88.7)	31.5 (88.7)	31.3 (88.3)	30.8 (87.4)	30.8 (87.4)	31.3 (88.3)	31.9 (89.4)	32.7 (90.9)	33.0 (91.4)	32.7 (90.9)	32.5 (90.5)	31.8 (89.3)
Daily mean °C (°F)	26.8 (80.2)	26.8 (80.2)	26.9 (80.4)	26.9 (80.4)	26.6 (79.9)	26.2 (79.2)	26.4 (79.5)	26.8 (80.2)	27.7 (81.9)	27.7 (81.9)	27.8 (82.0)	27.4 (81.3)	27.0 (80.6)
Mean daily minimum °C (°F)	21.9 (71.4)	22.2 (72.0)	22.4 (72.3)	22.6 (72.7)	22.5 (72.5)	21.6 (70.9)	21.6 (70.9)	21.8 (71.2)	22.7 (72.9)	22.5 (72.5)	22.9 (73.2)	22.4 (72.3)	22.3 (72.1)
Average rainfall mm (inches)	86 (3.4)	86 (3.4)	111 (4.4)	203 (8.0)	285 (11.2)	271 (10.7)	259 (10.2)	160 (6.3)	117 (4.6)	108 (4.3)	74 (2.9)	100 (3.9)	1,860 (73.3)
Source: Climate-Data.org
