= Iracema, Roraima =

Municipality of Roraima, Brazil

Iracema
- Municipality
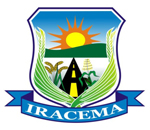
- Flag Coat of arms

- Location in Roraima state

- Location in Brazil Iracema (Brazil)
- Coordinates: 2°10′55″N 61°2′27″W
- Country: Brazil
- Region: North
- State: Roraima

Government
  - Mayor: Jairo Andre Ribeiro Sousa (PMDB)

Area
  - Total: 14,413 km^{2} (5,565 sq mi)

Population (2022)
  - Total: 10,023
  - Density: 0.69541/km^{2} (1.8011/sq mi)
- Time zone: UTC−4 (AMT)

Iracema (Brazilian Portuguese pronunciation: [iɾaˈsemɐ]) is a municipality located in the midwest of the state of Roraima in Brazil. Its population is 12,296 (2020) and its area is 14,413 km^{2}. Iracema started as an agricultural community. It became an independent municipality in 1994. The town is located on the BR-174 highway, and is known for its waterfall.
