= Mucajaí =

Municipality of Roraima, Brazil

- Municipality
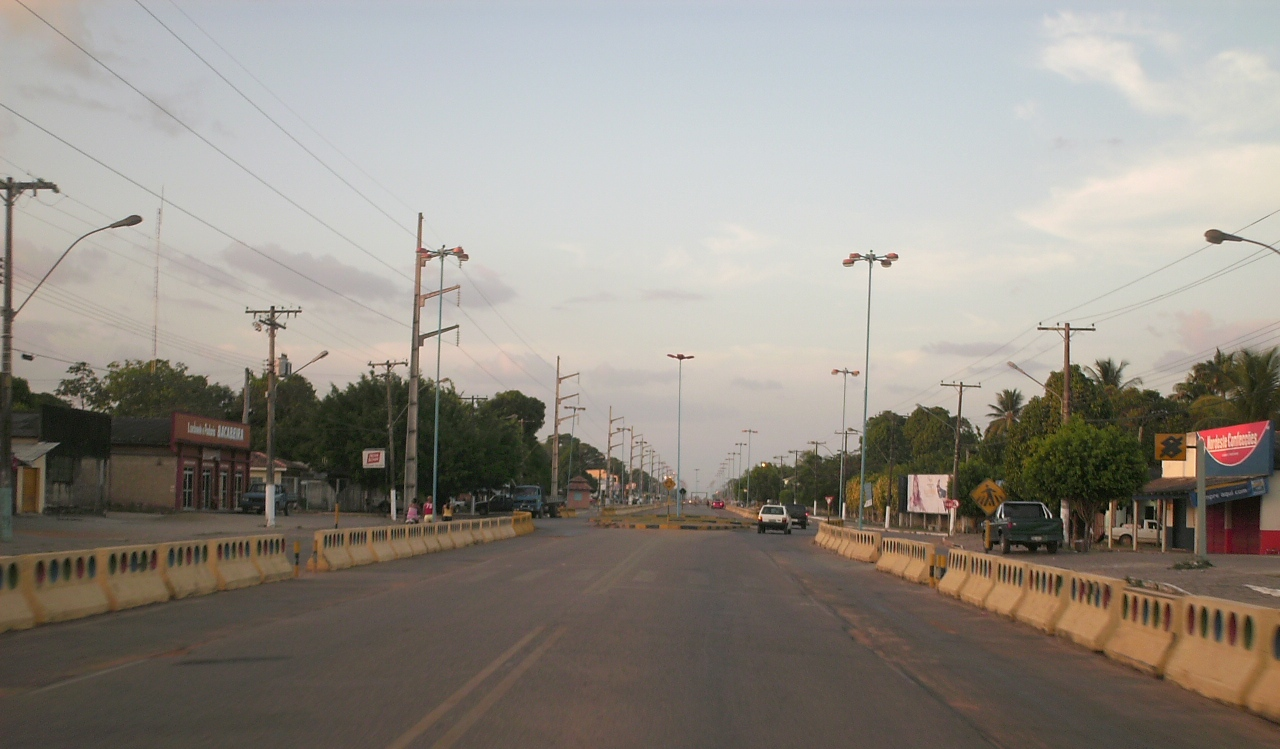

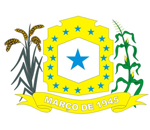
- Flag Coat of arms

- Location in Roraima state

- Location in Brazil
- Coordinates: 2°26′40″N 60°55′10″W
- Country: Brazil
- Region: North
- State: Roraima

Government
  - Mayor: Eronildes Aparecida Gonçalves (PR)

Area
  - Total: 12,461 km^{2} (4,811 sq mi)

Population (2022)
  - Total: 18,095
  - Density: 1.4521/km^{2} (3.7610/sq mi)
- Time zone: UTC−4 (AMT)
- Website: mucajai.rr.gov.br

Mucajaí (Brazilian Portuguese pronunciation: [mukɐʒaˈi]) is a municipality located in the midwest of the state of Roraima in Brazil. Its population is 18,172 (2020) and its area is 12,461 km^{2}.

Mucajaí started as Colônia Agrícola Fernando Costa, an agricultural colony, in 1951. In 1980, Apiaú, a larger scale colony, was nearby. In 1982, it became an independent municipality and renamed Mucajaí.

The municipality contains part of the Roraima National Forest. In 2018, a mob attacked and expelled about 300 Venezuelan exiles after a local resident of Mucajaí was killed in a fight with a Venezuelan.

== Sports ==
The local football club is Atlético Progresso Clube.
