= Hei tä bebi =

Aspect of indigenous Brazilian legend

Hei tä bebi (literally, "bottom layer") is the lowest of the four layers in the Ya̧nomamö cosmos. According to Ya̧nomamö tradition, hei tä bebi was created after a piece of hedu kä misi (heaven) fell onto Hei kä misi (earth). The falling piece of hedu knocked a hole into hei kä misi, creating a hole and dislodging a swathe of earth which fell below forming hei tä bebi.

When this fell through hei kä misi it took with it the garden and shabono (village) of Ama̧hiri-teri, but it did not take the surrounding jungle. As a result, the landscape of Hei tä bebi is barren and desolate. The people and village of Ama̧hiri-teri got trapped there, and as a result were forced to turn to cannibalism. Using their spiritual powers, they capture the souls of children from hei kä misi for food.
