= Amahiri-teri =

Amahiri-teri is the village and people of Yanomami mythology thought to inhabit the desolate underworld, Hei tä bebi. According to Ya̧nomamö folklore they had originally inhabited the earth, Hei kä misi, but when a piece of Hedu kä misi (heaven) fell down it fell onto Amahiri-teri, creating a hole and carrying the village and people through. As the only physical environment carried through was the Amahiri-teri shabono (village) and gardens, the landscape is void of significant natural resources, forcing the Amahiri-teri to turn to cannibalism.

The Amahiri-teri people hunt the souls of the Yanomami living above, using spiritual forces to capture children. The children are taken into Hei tä bebi and their souls are devoured as food. In order to lessen this danger, Yanomami shamans are constantly vigilant, and regular rites are performed to fend the Amahiri-teri off.

== Sources ==
- Chagnon, Napoleon A. (1997), Ya̧nomamö, Case Studies in Cultural Anthropology, series eds. George & Louis Spindler (5th ed.), Fort Worth: Harcourt Brace College Publishers, ISBN 0-15-505327-2
- Wilson, David J.; Salomon, Frank; Kicza, John E. (2007), "Native Americans of Middle and South America", Microsoft Encarta Online Encyclopedia, Encarta, archived from the original on 2009-10-28
