= Secrets of the Tribe =

2010 film directed by José Padilha

- Directed by: José Padilha
- Produced by: Carol Nahra; Marcos Prado; Mike Chamberlain
- Starring: Robert Borofsky; Jesus Carsozo; Napoleon A. Chagnon; Marie Isabel Eguillor; Brian Ferguson
- Cinematography: Lula Carvalho; Reynaldo Zangrandi
- Edited by: Bernardo Pimenta; Felipe Lacerda; José Padilha
- Music by: João Nabuco
- Production companies: Avenue B Productions; Zazen Produções
- Distributed by: Sideways Film, Nossa Distribuidora, Documentary Educational Resources
- Release dates: 22 January 2010 (Sundance); 22 February 2013 (Brazil)
- Running time: 110 minutes
- Country: Brazil
- Languages: English, Yanomamö, Portuguese

Secrets of the Tribe is a 2010 Brazilian documentary film by director José Padilha.

== Content ==
This documentary explores the allegations, first brought to light in the book Darkness in El Dorado, written by Patrick Tierney, that anthropologists studying the Yanomami Indians in the 1960s and '70s engaged in bizarre and inappropriate interactions with the tribe, including sexual and medical violations. Scientists accused in this film are among others James Neel, Napoleon Chagnon, Kenneth Good and Jacques Lizot.

== Release ==
Premiered at the 2010 Sundance Film Festival, the film was nominated for a Grand Jury Prize.

== Afterwards ==
Alice Dreger, an historian of medicine and science, and an outsider to the debate, concluded in a peer-reviewed publication that most of Tierney's claims (the movie is based on claims originally made by Tierney) were "baseless and sensationalistic charges".

A detailed investigation of these charges by a panel set up by the University of Michigan found the most serious charges to have no foundation and others to have been exaggerated. Almost all of the lengthy allegations made in Darkness in El Dorado were publicly rejected by the Provost's office of the University of Michigan in November 2000.

Sponsel and Turner, the two scientists who originally touted the book's claims, admitted that their charge against Neel "remains an inference in the present state of our knowledge: there is no 'smoking gun' in the form of a written text or recorded speech by Neel."

The American Anthropological Association has since rescinded its support of the book and acknowledged fraudulent and improper and unethical conduct by Tierney. The association admitted that "in the course of its investigation, in its publications, in the venues of its national meetings and its web site, [it] condoned a culture of accusation and allowed serious but unevaluated charges to be posted on its website and expressed in its newsletter and annual meetings" and that its "report has damaged the reputations of its targets, distracted public attention from the real sources of the Yanomami tragedy and misleadingly suggested that anthropologists are responsible for Yanomami suffering".

Stephen Broomer points out that, "Tierney wrote a polemical, unscientific book that invoked a scandal. Padilha's film is more evenhanded than this, no doubt because it includes that scandal as a subject, allowing Chagnon an opportunity to defend himself".
