= Davi Kopenawa Yanomami =

Yanomami shaman and activist

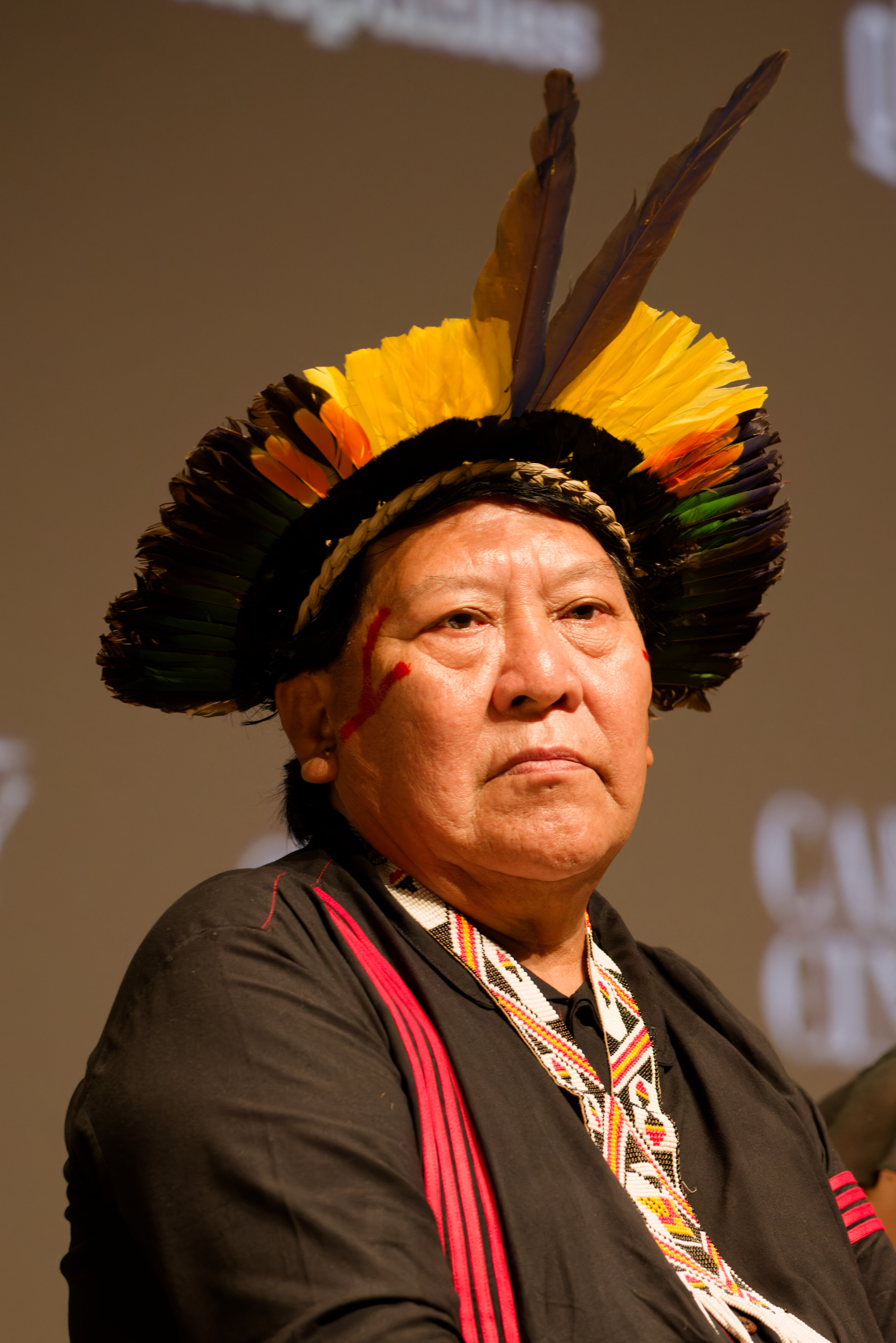
- Yanomami at the 2024 Cannes Film Festival for the film The Falling Sky
- Born: Davi Kobenawä Yanomamö; February 18, 1956 (age 70); Rio Toototobi, Amazonas, Brazil
- Occupation: Shaman

Davi Kopenawa Yanomami, name also written Davi Kobenawä Yanomamö (born Toototobi, Brazil, c. 1956), is a Yanomami shaman and Portuguese-speaking spokesperson for the Yanomami people in Brazil. He became known for his advocacy regarding tribal issues and Amazon rainforest conservation when the tribal rights organization Survival International invited him to accept the Right Livelihood Award on its behalf in 1989. Since then, Kopenawa has traveled around the globe to speak on the catastrophic consequences of the invasion of Yanomami land and the destruction of the Amazon rainforest. As part of his advocacy for the Yanomami people and against extractivist exploitation, Kopenawa has co-authored and contributed to multiple published books that have been translated to multiple languages.

His nickname ‘Kopenawa’ (hornet) was given to him in recognition of his ability to fight for his people.

== Early life and education ==
Davi Kopenawa Yanomami was born near the Rio Toototobi near the border with Venezuela. He learned Portuguese from a Christian mission run by New Tribes Mission, an American evangelical organization specializing in the proselytization of isolated peoples. The acquisition of Portuguese language proficiency (then rare among the Yanomami) enabled Kopenawa to interact with Brazil's Lusophone majority both directly and through the mass media.

In his own words translated from Portuguese:

I know that the authorities and many people came here because the planet is sick and they are trying to find out how to cure it. The people who come from many places, from the other side of the big lake, all come here to learn about how we live. I want to speak giving the message from Omai. Omai is the creator of the Yanomami who also has created all the shaboris that are the shamans. The shaboris are the ones that have the knowledge, and they sent two of us to deliver their message. The message is to stop destruction, to stop taking out minerals from under the ground, to stop taking out the steel with which all the metal utensils are made, and to stop building roads. We feel that a lot of riches have already been taken out of the indigenous lands, and a lot of these riches are getting old and useless, and it would be much better if the Brazilian government would give these riches to the poor in Brazil. Our work is to protect nature, the wind, the mountains, the forest, the animals, and this is what we want to teach you people.

Kopenawa is the son-in-law of another traditional tribal leader with whom he apprenticed to be a shaman. His wife lost much of her family to measles and other diseases brought to the area in the 1970s by road construction crews and garimpeiros (small-time gold miners). Kopenawa has mentioned this as part of his personal motivation to speak out on his people's behalf. Kopenawa was orphaned as a child when his parents died from diseases transmitted by outsiders.

After some months of staying on our territory, they started to transmit malaria to us. That means that the garimpeiros were already sick. Mosquitos bit the garimpeiros and then bit us. That is how we got the disease. The garimpeiros also brought in other diseases. There are complications of pneumonia, sometimes associated with malaria; tuberculosis; skin diseases that often are associated with other diseases, and, especially in children, can be fatal; there was an epidemic of yellow fever in the area; hepatitis.

== Career ==
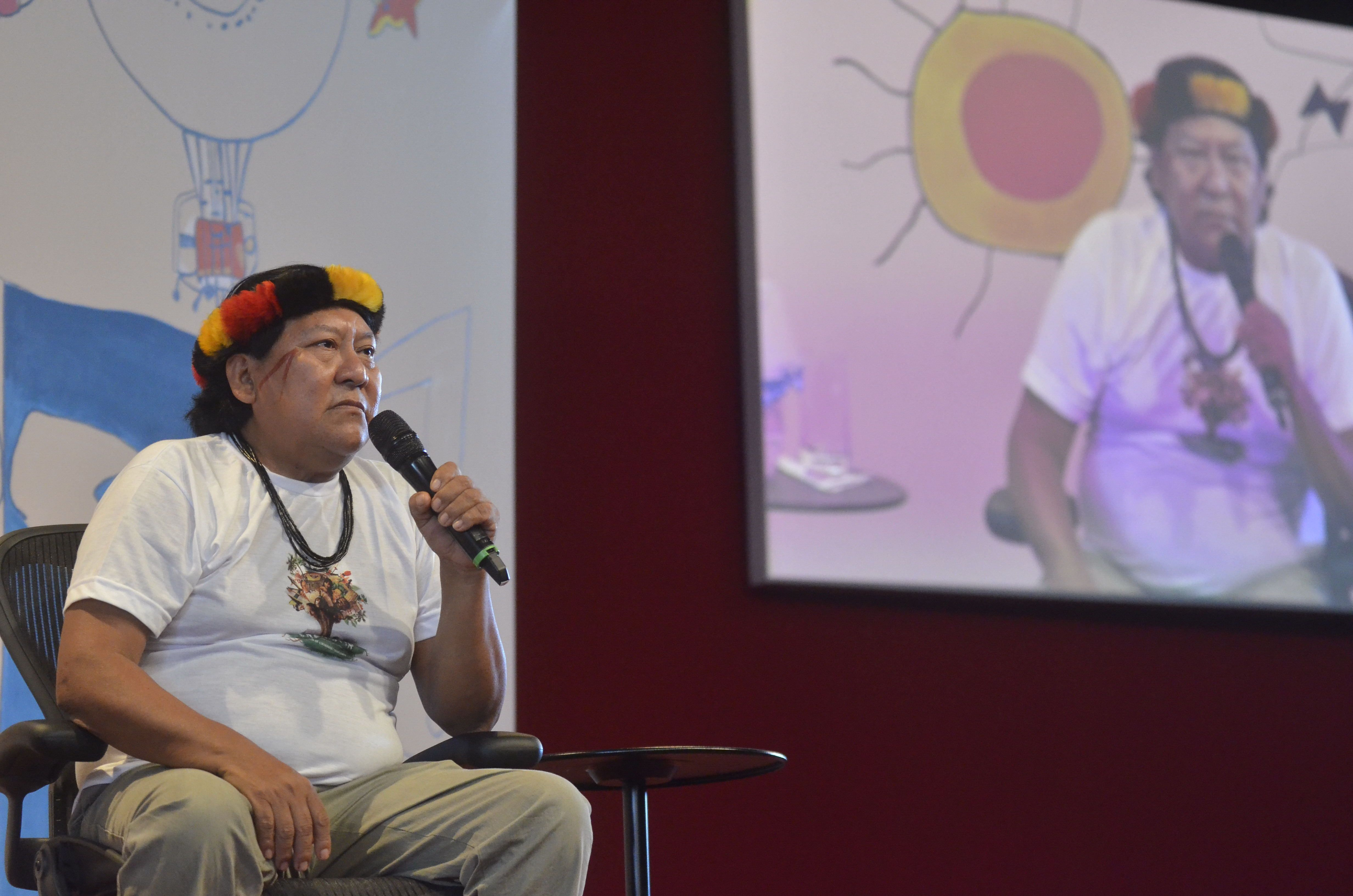
Davi Kopenawa Yanomami speaking in 2014

In the 1980s, he began working for the Brazilian government organization Fundação Nacional do Índio (FUNAI) at a post in Demini in the center of Yanomami territory as an intermediary between the government and indigenous peoples with whom outsiders had little or no contact. He also accompanied health workers to Yanomami villages and has worked closely with organizations such as Comissão Pró-Yanomami (CCPY) and Survival International in the fight for the integrity of Yanomami lands in Brazil.

Since the invasion of illegal rubber tappers into Yanomami territory began in 1987, Yanomami has worked to remove them from the area and to create a parkland therein. His action resulted in death threats from the tappers. After a major international campaign led by Kopenawa, Survival International and CCPY, the Brazilian government recognized Yanomami land rights in 1992 just before the UN's Earth Summit.

Kopenawa has been an advocate for his community for over 30 years. In the process, he has visited many countries to spread his message about the importance of respecting indigenous peoples rights and their fundamental and unique role in conserving the rainforest for the benefit of humanity.

In 2004, Kopenawa and other Yanomami in Brazil founded the Hutukara Yanomami Association (Portuguese: Hutukara Associação Yanomami) to formally defend their rights. As well as advocating for Yanomami rights, it runs educational projects where Yanomami teachers work in the communities teaching literacy, maths, geography and human rights, and records deforestation images using drones to back up the case for land protection.

Yanomami continues to speak out about the dangers facing the Yanomami. He has warned about the impact large scale mining will have on the Yanomami if the Brazilian congress votes to allow mining on indigenous lands.

We the Yanomami people think that mining will not bring any benefits to anyone. It will only destroy nature. It will only destroy the streams and the rivers and kill the fish and kill the environment. And kill us. And bring in diseases which never existed in our land. It will bring roads and people who will bring in disease, guns and violence. So we, the Yanomami people do not want the national congress to approve the law or the president to sign it. We do not want to accept this law. Our land has to be respected. Our land is our heritage, a heritage which protects us. This land belongs to us so that we can plant, hunt, be healthy, it is our home where will live for the rest of our lives.

In a CNN interview published in February 2023, Yanomami criticized Jair Bolsonaro, who served as the president of Brazil from 2019 to 2022, for encouraging mining in the Amazon Rainforest. He also expressed hope for improvement of the situation with the crackdown starting in 2023 on illegal mining by the administration of Luiz Inácio Lula da Silva and the appointment of the first Brazilian Minister of Indigenous People, Sônia Guajajara.

=== Criticism ===
Yanomami's unique role among his people has been commented on skeptically even by those sympathetic to him and his cause. Anthropologist Napoleon Chagnon wrote regarding Yanomami:

His non-Yanomamö supporters in Brazil, intelligent and well-intentioned advocates of the Yanomamö cause, are promoting him as a spokesman for his people. Such a role exists largely because our culture must deal with other cultures through their leaders – it is the only way we know how to deal with them. Everything I know about Davi Kobenawä is positive, and I am confident that he is a sincere and honest man. When I read his proclamations, I am moved – but I am also sure that someone from our culture wrote them. They have too much the voice of Rousseau’s idealism and sound very non-Yanomamö. My concern is that he is being put into a difficult position, fraught with consequences for the future of the Yanomamö. For one thing, there is currently no such thing as a pan-Yanomamö awareness, and so he cannot possibly be speaking for the Venezuelan Yanomamö.

Survival International and many others with extensive experience of the Yanomami have severely criticized Chagnon's work which detrimentally portrays the Yanomami as "sly, aggressive, and intimidating" and falsely claims that they "live in a state of chronic warfare". It was referred to by the Brazilian government when it planned to fragment Yanomami land in 1988, in a proposal which would have been catastrophic for them and which was only prevented by a vigorous campaign.

Chagnon's views in this matter were criticized by investigative journalist Patrick Tierney in his controversial book Darkness in El Dorado.

=== Awards ===
In 1988, Yanomami received an award from the United Nations Environment Programme for his work protecting the forest against rubber tappers and establishing Yanomami Park.

In 2009, he was honoured with the Bartolome de las Casas award in Spain and later gave a speech to the UK parliament where he warned that the goldminers are once again invading Yanomami land and disease is spreading.

Davi Kopenawa Yanomami, together with the Hutukara Yanomami Association (Brazil), received the Right Livelihood Award in 2019 "for their courageous determination to protect the forests and biodiversity of the Amazon, and the lands and culture of its indigenous peoples".

=== Published works ===
In his role as activist and spokesperson for his community, Kopenawa has worked on a variety of published projects to disseminate Yanomami knowledge and warn the world of the ecological destruction caused by the extractivist exploitation of the Amazon. He has both co-authored and contributed to books as well as written and appeared in documentary films.

==== Written works ====
- Contributor to Rêves d'Amazonie (2005) published by Centre Culturel Abbaye de Daoulas (French)
- Co-author for La Chute de Ciel (2010), by Kopenawa and Bruce Albert, published by Plon, Paris (French). Translated to English, Portuguese, Italian, Spanish, and German.
- Co-author for O Desejo Dos Outros Uma Etnografia Dos Sonhos Yanomami (2022) published by Ubu Editora in São Paulo (Portuguese)
- Co-author for Yanomami: l'esprit de la forêt (2022), by Kopenawa and Bruce Albert, published by Actes Sud Editions, Arles (French). Translated to Portuguese, Spanish and Italian.

==== Film ====
- Writer for Holding Up the Sky (2023), directed by Pieter Van Eeck, produced by Hanne Phlypo
- Writer for The Last Forest | A Última Floresta (2021), directed by Luiz Bolognesi, produced by Gullane

==== The Falling Sky ====
The Falling Sky was Kopenawa's first major published work. It was originally published in French by Plon as La chute de ciel: Paroles d’un chaman Yanomami, co-authored by Kopenawa and Bruce Albert, with a preface by Jean Malaurie. Since then, the book has been translated to English, Portuguese, Italian, Spanish, and German. The English version was published in 2013 by Harvard University Press, translated by Nicholas Elliott and Alison Dundy and with a foreword by Bill McKibben.

The book is a collaborative work between Kopenawa and French anthropologist Bruce Albert. Albert's introduction to the volume states that he first met Kopenawa in 1978 and encountered him again in 1981. From 1985 on, Albert frequently visited Kopenawa's village of Watoriki for his research on the Yanomami. Albert and Kopenawa got to know each other thanks to Albert's frequent visits to Watoriki, and they built the trust necessary to embark on such a project. However, it was the decimation of the Yanomami by gold prospectors in the late 1980s that spurred Kopenawa's desire to speak to the Western world. The two began serious work on the book in 1989 (Kopenawa and Albert, 2013; 7). It is based on a series of interviews and videotapes in which Kopenawa narrated his people's struggles to Albert.

===== Structure =====
The Falling Sky begins with two prologues: one from Albert which briefly explains the conception of the text and provides basic introductory information about the Yanomami, himself, and Kopenawa; the second one is from Kopenawa. Its title, “Words Given,” asserts Kopenawa's intention to educate the Western world, to impart upon them the gift of the Yanomami knowledge. After the prologues, the book is organized into three parts: I. Becoming Other, II. Metal Smoke, and III. The Falling Sky. Part one immerses readers in Yanomami culture, history, and myth. Here Kopenawa describes the process of becoming a shaman and introduces readers to the xapiri. In part two, Kopenawa narrates his encounters with “white men” and describes the devastating effects of the world's extractivist activities on the forest and his people. In part three, Kopenawa speaks about his time as an activist, his travels to the western world to spread the words of the Yanomami people, and his eco-apocalyptic call to action.

===== Literary significance =====
The Falling Sky is unique in the way it embodies multiple literary genres. It is not a history of the Yanomami people, and it is not an autobiography. It captures not only Kopenawa's life story, but also the struggles of indigenous people for their survival, and the effort to translate Yanomami spirituality, cosmology, and shamanism for the benefit of those who Kopenawa calls "the white man". Albert himself calls it “a life story, autoethnography, and cosmological manifesto” (Kopenawa and Albert, 2013; 1).

It has been received as a work of world literature due to its transnational circulation. including Kopenawa and Albert's original work of translating the Yanomami language and culture into a Western language (French). Scholar Krista Brune considers The Falling Sky a work of Amerindian perspectivist translation because it brings Amerindian perspectivism (also referred to as multinaturalism) to Western language. The translation maintains the meaning of Kopenawa's words without establishing false equivalencies or flattening their particularities. As such, the text contests the Eurocentric and Western idea of the meaning of “world” and offers the Yanomami cosmovision as a legitimate conceptual framework for what “world” means: a world that considers humans and nonhumans as part of a greater whole, that understands “humanity” as positional.

== See also ==
- Ailton Krenak
- Rigoberta Menchú
- Stephen Corry
- Roy Sesana
