= Jacques Lizot =

French anthropologist

Jacques Lizot (11 February 1938 – 22 June 2022) was a French anthropologist and linguist. He lived among the Yanomami people in Venezuela for over 20 years, documenting their culture and language. Among his writings are the 1976 book The Yanomami in the Face of Ethnocide, the 1985 book Tales of the Yanomami: Daily Life in the Venezuelan Forest and the 2004 Encyclopedic Dictionary of the Yanomami Language. The 2000 book Darkness in El Dorado and the 2010 documentary film Secrets of the Tribe included allegations that Lizot had traded goods for sexual favours from young boys. Lizot denied the allegations.

== Early life and education ==
Jacques Lizot was born on 11 February 1938 in Montreuil, France. He studied at Sorbonne University, receiving a PhD in anthropology in 1967. He was an Orientalist and studied classical Arabic. His doctoral thesis concerned the rural sociology of an Algerian village, based on surveys conducted in 1966 in Mitidja. Lizot later expanded on the thesis in his 1973 monograph Metidja, un village algérien de l'Ouarsenis.

Lizot was a student and protégé of Claude Levi-Strauss, who invited him to participate in medical anthropology research of the Yanomami people in Venezuela.

== Life among the Yanomami ==
Lizot travelled to Venezuela where he took part in a joint project of the French Atomic Energy Commission and the French National Centre for Scientific Research from 1968 to 1970. Lizot later returned to Venezuela and lived among the Yanomami people for over 20 years, with over 15 of those years at Tayari, a village near Bisaasi-teri. A Yanomami village was named for Lizot.

Lizot had differences with the missionaries of Salesians of Don Bosco but helped them develop teaching materials for the Yanomami. Lizot returned to France in 1993.

== Writings on the Yanomami ==
Lizot studied the Yanomami language as well as the myths, material culture, and economy of the Yanomami. He wrote the 1976 book The Yanomami in the Face of Ethnocide and the 1985 book Tales of the Yanomami: Daily Life in the Venezuelan Forest. His 1985 book is descriptive and partly narrative. He has received criticism for disregarding the impact of European contact on the Yanomami.

Lizot has been critical of fellow Yanomami scholar Napoleon Chagnon, writing that his research makes it "impossible to determine the precise origin of the quantitative data" and refuting Chagnon's conclusions about the role of violence in Yanomami culture. Writing in American Ethnologist, Lizot dismissed Chagnon's thesis that unokai, Yanomami men who have murdered, had greater reproductive success, arguing that systematic bias on Chagnon's part led him to omit the fact that unokai is a category broader than just men who have murdered. In the introduction to Tales of the Yanomami, Lizot writes:

"I would like my book to help revise the exaggerated representation that has been given of Yanomami violence. The Yanomami are warriors; they can be brutal and cruel, but they can also be delicate, sensitive and loving. Violence is only sporadic; it never dominates social life for any length of time, and long peaceful moments can separate two explosions. When one is acquainted with the societies of the North American plains or the societies of the Chaco in South America, one cannot say that Yanomami culture is organized around warfare as Chagnon does."

Lizot mostly eschewed theoretical extrapolations of Yanomami culture, preferring a descriptive approach. He stressed the weakness of the Yanomami political system and attributed violent acts in part to illicit sexual relations. Lizot avoided using Chagnon's materialist explanations for warfare, instead taking a structuralist view of warfare as "a form of exchange tending toward equilibrium".

Lizot published the Diccionario enciclopedico de la lengua yanomami publié (Encyclopedic Dictionary of the Yanomami Language) in 2004. He donated his field notes and documents pertaining to the Yanomami to the Social Anthropology Laboratory of the Collège de France in 2004.

== Accusations of sexual improprietry ==
The 2000 book Darkness in El Dorado by Patrick Tierney described a series of alleged ethical breaches by anthropologists studying the Yanomami, including those of Chagnon, Kenneth Good, and Lizot. The book detailed how Lizot "probably distributed more clothes and shotguns than any other individual among the Yanomami". According to Tierney, Lizot traded goods made from steel for sexual favours from young men— "two sex acts for a machete, six for a shotgun". The Yanomami word for anal intercourse became Lizo-mou, "to do like Lizot". Tierney also wrote that Lizot was briefly imprisoned in Venezuela for child molestation and repeatedly denounced.

Tierney also argued that Lizot shifted the balance of power in villages. By providing material goods for his village, they became powerful politically. According to Tierney, Lizot's village made war on "Chagnon's village", resulting in ten deaths and Lizot's village being razed.

Lizot had previously written that the Yanomami were "sexual innovators of stunning sophistication, an Erotic people." In response to the allegations laid out in Tierney's book, Lizot said that the sex was consensual and between adults. In an interview in Time, he called the allegations "disgusting. ... My house is not a brothel. I gave gifts because it is part of the Yanomami culture."

Tierney's book was criticized for relying on hearsay and lacking documentation. Later independent investigations, including by the American Anthropological Association, showed that some of Tierney's allegations were exaggerated, false or defamatory, but did not call into question the facts attributed to Lizot.

The 2010 documentary film Secrets of the Tribe by José Padilha revisited the topic and included interviews with men who had sexual encounters with Lizot.

== Awards ==
Lizot was awarded the Académie Française's Prix Estrade-Delcros in 1976 for his book Le cercle des feux. Faits et dits des Indiens Yanomami.

== Publications ==
- Dictionnaire yanõmami-français (1970)
- Metidja, un village algérien de l'Ouarsenis (1973)
- Le cercle des feux. Faits et dits des Indiens Yanomami (1976)
- The Yanomami in the face of ethnocide (1976)
- Les Yanõmami centraux (1984)
- Tales of the Yanomami: daily life in the Venezuelan forest (1985)
- Mitología yanomami (1991)
- Warriors of the Amazon (1996)
- Diccionario enciclopedico de la lengua yanomami publié (2004)
