= Duku kä misi =

Duku kä misi (literally, "pristine layer") is the topmost and oldest of four layers in the Ya̧nomamö cosmos. Everything in the cosmos originated in the duku kä misi, but it subsequently fell down into lower layers and duku kä misi has since been abandoned. The Ya̧nomamö compare it to an "old woman" and give it the characteristics of an "abandoned garden". In Ya̧nomamö culture gardens share with post-menopausal women lack of fertility. Of the four layers, it is the least referred to in Ya̧nomamö culture.
