= Demini River =

- Location within Brazil
- Native name: Rio Demini (Portuguese)

Location
- Country: Brazil

Physical characteristics
- Mouth
  - location: Rio Negro
  - coordinates: 0.772800°S 62.941267°W

Basin features
- River system: Rio Negro
- Tributaries
  - left: Toototobi River
  - right: Cuieiras River, Araçá River

Demini River is a river in the Amazon rainforest of the state of Amazonas, Brazil. It is a tributary of the Rio Negro.

== Course ==
The Demini River rises in the Serra do Aracá State Park, a 1,818,700 hectares (4,494,000 acres) conservation unit created in 1990. It flows southwest through the park, then flows south to join the Rio Negro. The Toototobi River is a tributary of the upper part of the Demini near the headwaters of the Orinoco near the border of Venezuela. The Yanomami índios are native to this area.

== Sources ==
- PES da Serra do Aracá (in Portuguese), ISA: Instituto Socioambiental
