= Omai (disambiguation) =

Omai (c. 1751 – 1780) was the second Pacific Islander to visit Europe.

Omai may also refer to:

- Omai (play), a 1785 play
- Omai (deity)
- Omai mine, a gold mine in Guyana
