= Yanomami women =

Women of the South American Yanomami Indigenous group

The Yanomami people are an Indigenous group who live in the Amazon Rainforest along the borders of Venezuela and Brazil. There are estimated to be only approximately 35,000 Indigenous people remaining. They are interfluvial Indians who live in small villages along the Mavaca and Orinoco Rivers, with each village consisting of a single shabono, or communal dwelling. Largely uncontacted by the outside world, the Yanomami have been affected by illnesses introduced by gold miners since the 1980s. Anthropological studies have emphasized that the Yanomami are a violent people, and although this can be true, the women of the Yanomami culture generally abstain from violence and warfare. Although males dominate the Yanomami culture, Yanomami women play an important role in sustaining their lifestyle.

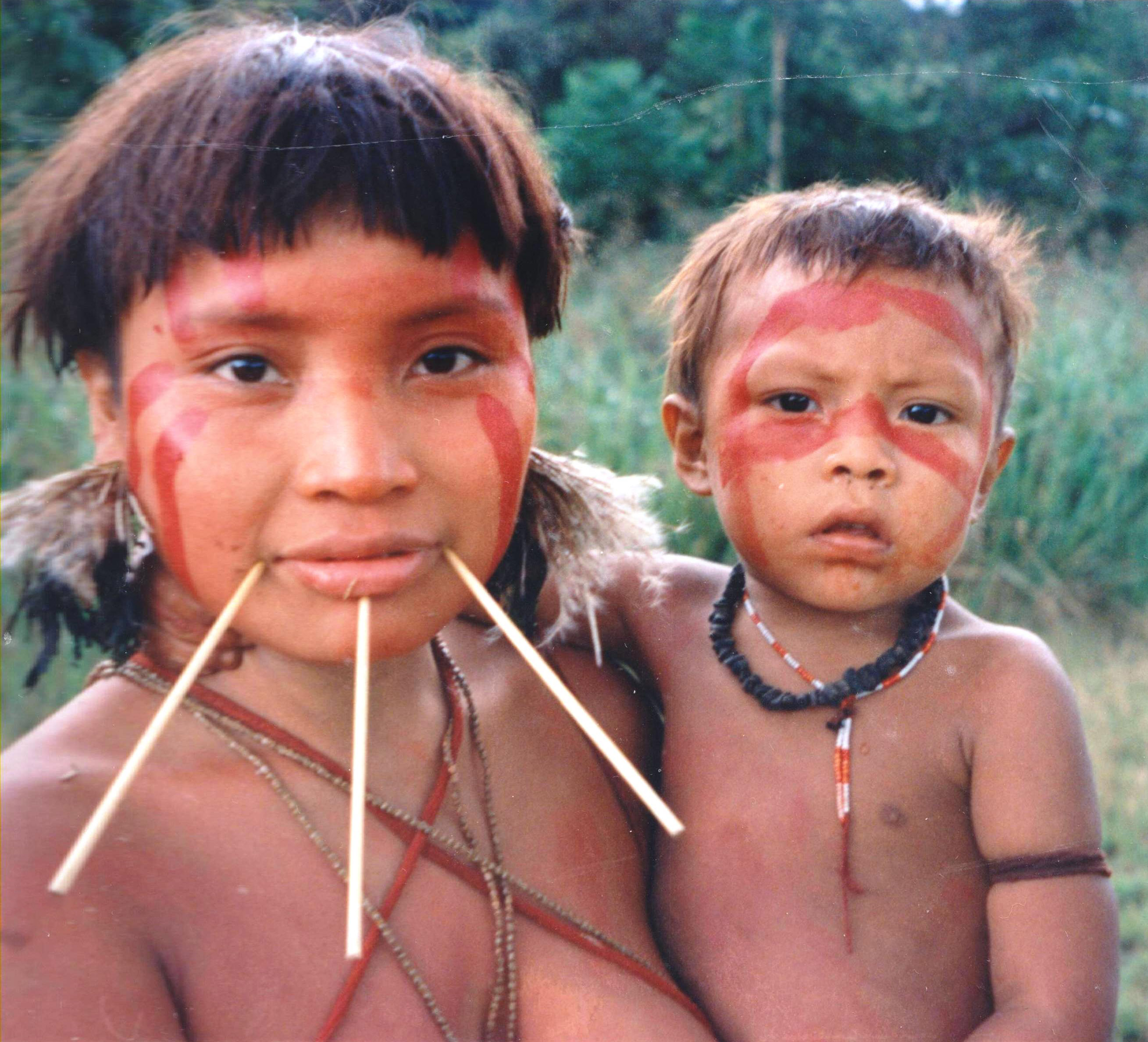
Yanomami women decorate their faces with sticks that pierce the cheeks and lip. Photo taken in Homoxi, Brazil, June 1997.

== Domestic life ==
Yanomami women are responsible for domestic duties and chores, excluding hunting and killing large game. Although the women do not hunt, they do work in gardens and gather fruits, vegetables, medicinal plants, fish, small animals, honey and insects for food. The garden plots are sectioned off by family. Bananas, sugarcane, mangoes, sweet potatoes, papaya, manioc, and other crops are grown. About 60 different crops are grown in these gardens which account for about 80% of their food. The women also collect nuts, shellfish and insect larvae. Wild honey is highly prized and the Yanomami harvest 15 different kinds. The Yanomami women cultivate these gardens until they are no longer fertile, and then move their plots. As Amazonian soil is not very fertile, a new garden is cleared every two or three years.

Women are expected to carry 70 to 80 pound loads of crops on their backs during harvest season, using bark straps and woven baskets. Plantains and grubs are common sources of food, and are staples in the Yanomami diet.

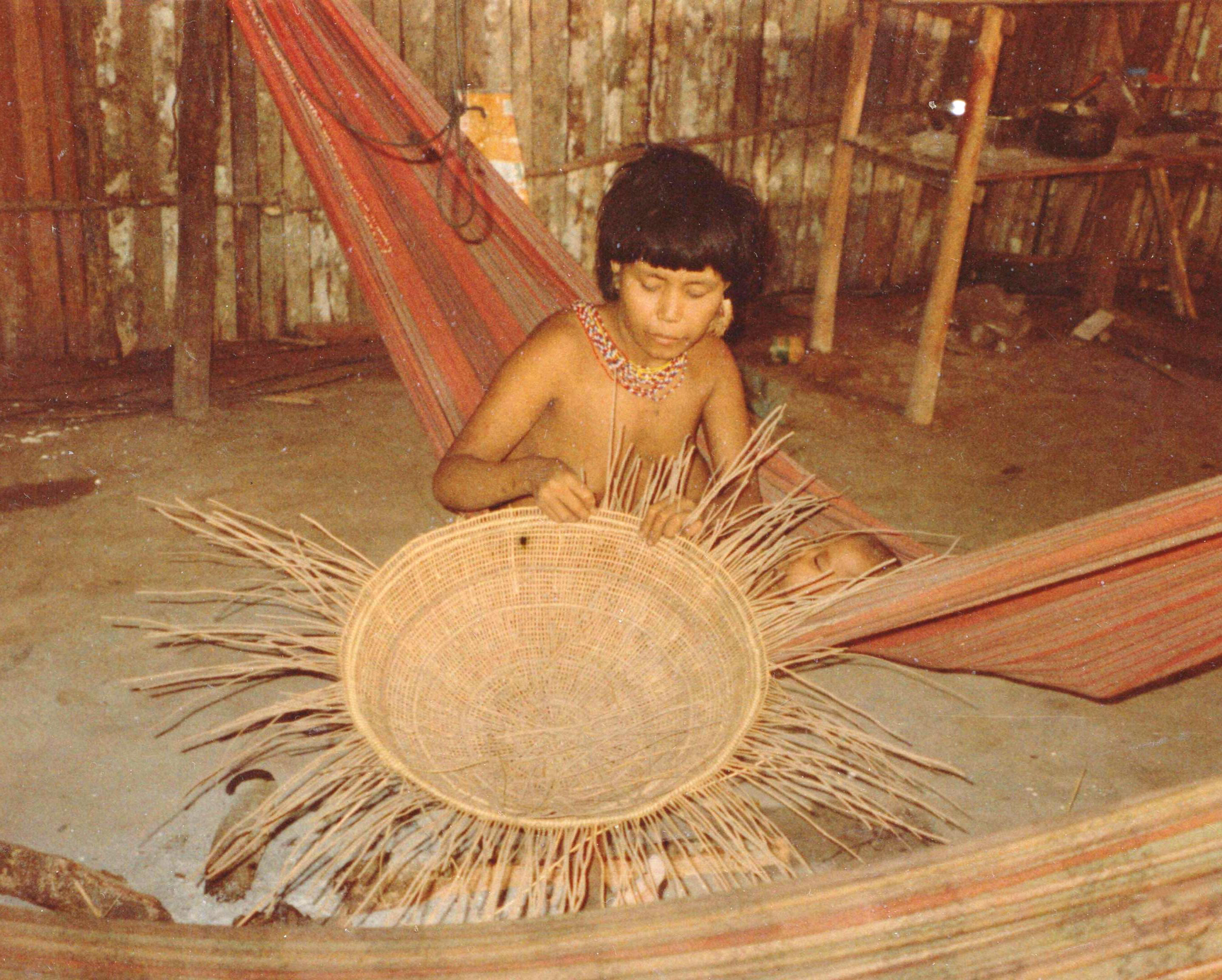
Yanomami woman weaves a basket at the maloca do Eduardo in Brazil, June 1999.

While the men hunt, the women and young children go off in search of termite nests and other grubs, which will later be roasted around family hearths. Each family has its own hearth where food is prepared and cooked during the day. At night, hammocks are slung near the fire which is stoked all night to keep people warm. Although hunting accounts for only 10% of Yanomami food, among men it is considered the most reputable of skills and meat is greatly valued by everyone. No hunter ever eats the meat that he has killed. Instead he shares it out among friends and family. In return, he will be given meat by another hunter. Sometimes, the women also pursue frogs, land crabs, or caterpillars, or even look for vines that can be woven into baskets. While some women gather these small sources of food, other women go off and fish for several hours during the day. The women also commonly use plants such as manioc to turn into flat cakes, which they cook over a small pile of coals.

Yanomami women are expected to bear and raise many children, who are expected to help their mothers with domestic chores from a very young age, and mothers rely very much on help from their daughters.

Using small strings of bark and roots, Yanomami women weave and decorate baskets. They use these baskets to carry plants, crops, and food to bring back to the shabono. They use a red berry known as onoto to dye the baskets, as well as to paint their bodies and dye their loin cloths. After the baskets are painted, they are further decorated with masticated charcoal pigment.

== Puberty and menstruation ==
The start of menstruation symbolizes the beginning of womanhood. Girls typically start menstruation around the age of 12-15. Girls are often betrothed before menarche and the marriage may only be consummated once the girl starts menstruating, though the taboo is often violated and many girls become sexually active before then. The Yanomami word for menstruation (roo) translates literally as "squatting" in English, as they use no pads or cloths to absorb the blood. Due to the belief that menstrual blood is poisonous and dangerous, girls are kept hidden away in a small tent-like structure constructed of a screen of leaves. A deep hole is built in the structure over which girls squat, to "rid themselves" of their blood. These structures are regarded as isolation screens.

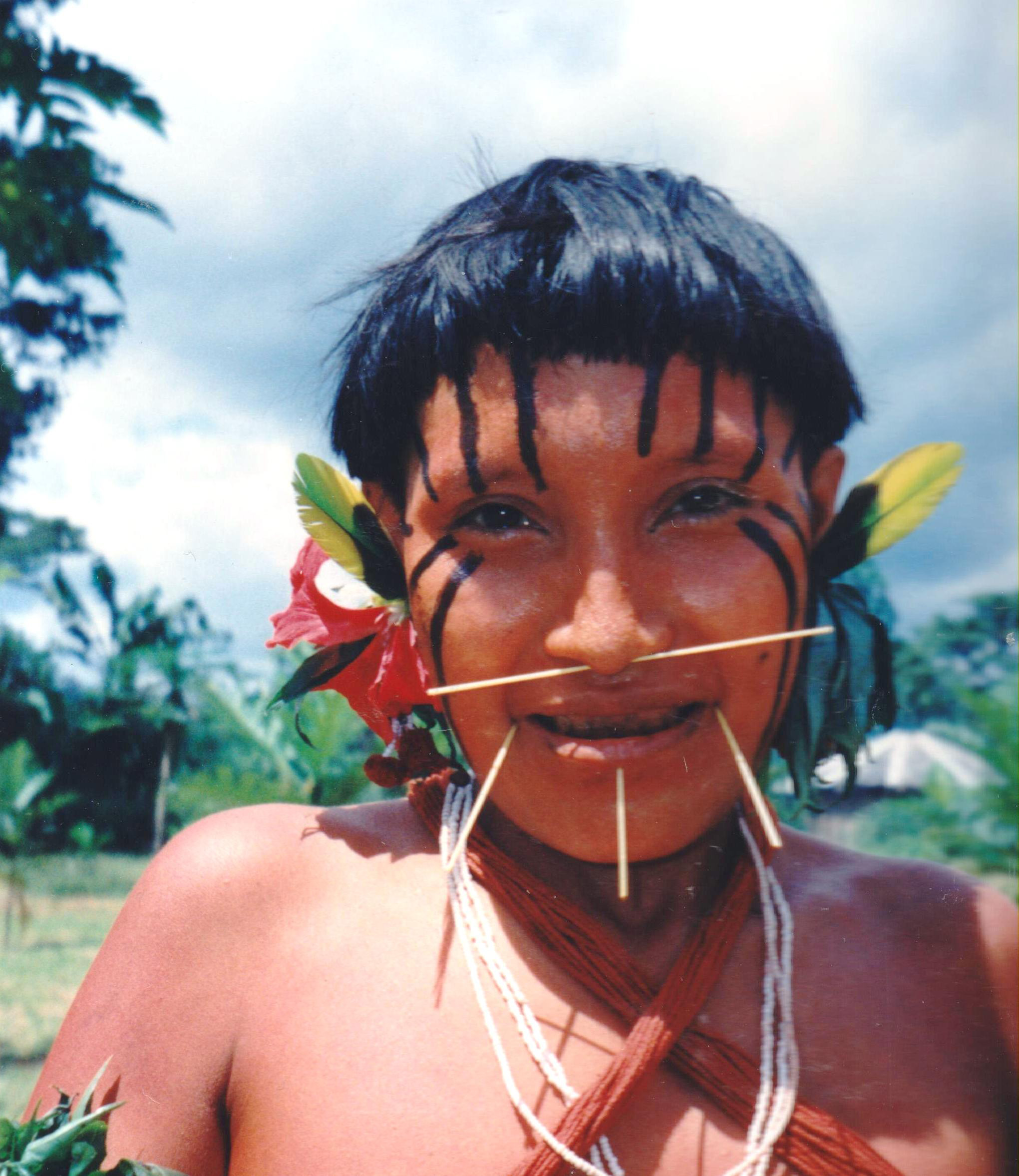
Yanomami girl at Xidea, Brazil, August 1997.

The mother is notified immediately, and she, along with the elder female friends of the girl, are responsible for disposing of her old cotton garments and must replace them with new ones symbolizing her womanhood and availability for marriage. During the week of that first menstrual period the girl is fed with a stick, for she is forbidden from touching the food in any way. While on confinement she has to whisper when speaking and she may only speak to close kin, such as siblings or parents, but never a male.

Up until the time of menstruation, girls are treated as children, and are only responsible for assisting their mothers in household work. When they approach the age of menstruation, they are sought out by males as potential wives. Puberty is not seen as a significant time period with male Yanomami children, but it is considered very important for females. After menstruating for the first time, the girls are expected to leave childhood and enter adulthood, and take on the responsibilities of a grown Yanomami woman. After a young girl gets her period, she is forbidden from showing her genitalia and must keep herself covered with a loincloth.

The menstrual cycle of Yanomami women does not occur frequently due to constant nursing or child birthing, and is treated as a very significant occurrence only at this time.

== Wedding and marriage traditions ==
In Yanomami society, marriage ceremonies are almost non-existent and are not celebrated in any way. Marriage is a social dynamic within villages, and they are usually driven by political opportunity by men who are seeking alliances with other men from different villages. Polygamous marriages are common, meaning husbands can have many wives. The demand for women outweighs the actual population of the Yanomami women because of the growing practice of polygamy. A girl can be promised to a man at an age as young as five or six, however cannot officially be married off until after her first menstrual period. This is considered a marriageable age.

After a Yanomami girl has her first menstrual period, she is literally handed off by one of her parents to another man, usually a relative. Cross-cousin marriages, which are marriages between the girl and the son of a maternal uncle or paternal aunt, are the most common form of marriage. Most prefer to marry within the same community, for fear of violent breakouts between different communities. The girl goes to live with her spouse, and must perform the chores and duties she previously did for her mother.

Violence and abuse between couples in Yanomami culture is very common, and if a woman feels she can no longer bear to live with her husband, she may flee to live with her brothers.

Polygamy is commonly practiced in Yanomami culture. The elder wife in a marriage usually has precedence over the others, and can act as a boss or a superior over the other wives. She usually no longer has sexual relations with her husband, however she can give the most unpleasant chores to the wife she chooses. The husband is not supposed to show favorites, due to jealousy between the wives.

== Violence ==
The Yanomami people have a history of acting extremely violently not only towards other ethnic groups, but towards one another. Men generally initiate this violence, and women are often victims of physical abuse and anger. When Yanomami warriors fight and raid nearby communities, women are often raped, beaten, and brought back to their captors' shabono to be kept as prisoners. Although capturing women is not the focus for these raids, it is seen as a secondary benefit. Wives are beaten on a regular basis, so as to keep them docile and faithful to their husbands. Sexual jealousy causes a majority of the violence.

Women are beaten with clubs, sticks, machetes, and other blunt or sharp objects. Burning with a branding stick occurs often, and symbolizes a male's strength or dominance over his wife.

== Rituals and festivities ==
Rituals are a very important part of Yanomami culture. The spirit world is a fundamental part of Yanomami life. Every creature, rock, tree, and mountain has a spirit. Sometimes, these are malevolent and aggressive (shawara), and are believed to cause illness. Sometimes they are benevolent and help fight off illness (hekura). Although many ceremonies exclude female involvement or participation, women play an important role in preparing for these ceremonies. For large ceremonies, Yanomami women prepare foods and ferment alcoholic drinks for the men. The women also participate in the practice of endocannibalism, where the ashes of a deceased kinsman are mixed with stewed bananas and consumed. This tradition is meant to strengthen the Yanomami people and keep the spirit of that individual alive. The ritual consumption of ashes is accompanied by mourning and a recounting of the individual's biography, the only time that a deceased person's name may be mentioned after her or his death.

== Politics ==
In Yanomami culture, a woman can become a shaman, but not a headman. This is due to the fact that headmen are expected to be peacekeepers and valiant warriors, both of which require force and violence, which women are not considered to have in Yanomami culture. In this society, women gain respect as they age, after they marry and have children. Elderly women are very respected, and ultimately can become immune to violence and warfare between villages. They are immune from the violence of raiders and can safely travel from one village to another without fear of injury. Usually, elderly women are expected to recover the body of a slain Yanomami who was killed in a raid. Although women are disrespected and belittled at a young age, they are respected and looked highly upon when they age, and have much power in tribal politics and decision-making.
