= Cuieiras River =

Cuieiras River may refer to:

- Cuieiras River (Demini River), a river in the Barcelos municipality of Amazonas state in north-western Brazil.
- Cuieiras River (Rio Negro), a river in the Maués municipality of Amazonas state in north-western Brazil.
