= Toototobi River =

River in Brazil

Coordinates: 1°34′N 63°33′W

Toototobi River is a river in the Amazon rainforest of Amazonas, Brazil. It is a tributary of the upper Rio Demini near the headwaters of the Orinoco.

The river flows through the territory of Kopenawa near the border of Venezuela. The so-called "Toototobi Yanomami índios" take their name from this river. Davi Kopenawa Yanomami, a shaman and Portuguese-speaking spokesperson of that tribal group, was born close to it. The area may be a starting point for the epidemics of measles and other diseases which decimated the local peoples starting in the 1970s.
