= Haverkamp =

Haverkamp is a toponymic surname. A haverkamp was a fenced field of oats or oat farm. Notable people with the surname include:

- Anselm Haverkamp (born 1943), German-American philosopher and literary critic
- Christina Haverkamp (born 1958), German activist
- Egbert Haverkamp-Begemann (1923–2017), Dutch-American art historian
- Maarten Haverkamp (born 1974), Dutch CDA politician
- Roy T. Haverkamp (1924–2018), American diplomat
- Siwart Haverkamp (1684–1742), Dutch classical scholar
