= Omai (deity) =

Omai is a creator deity (god) mentioned by Davi Kopenawa Yanomami, a shaman and Portuguese-speaking spokesperson of the Yanomami índios of Brazil.

In his own words translated from Portuguese:

I want to speak giving the message from Omai. Omai is the creator of the Yanomami who also has created all the shaboris that are the shamans. The shaboris are the ones that have the knowledge, and they sent two of us to deliver their message.

As Davi Kopenawa learned Portuguese from a Christian mission run by New Tribes Mission, an American evangelical organization specializing in the proselytization of isolated peoples, it may be that Omai is regarded as synonymous with God the Father as revered in Christian belief via syncretism.
