= Yanoama =

1965 biography

Yanoáma: dal racconto di una donna rapita dagli Indi
- 1996 English edition
- Author: Ettore Biocca, Helena Valero (uncredited)
- Language: Italian
- Publisher: Leonardo da Vinci
- Publication date: 1965
- OCLC: 253337729
- Website: https://archive.org/details/yanoamastoryofhe0000vale/

Yanoama: The Story of Helena Valero, a Girl Kidnapped by Amazonian Indians (original Italian title Yanoáma: dal racconto di una donna rapita dagli Indi) is a biography of Helena Valero, a mixed-race mestizo woman who was captured in the 1930s as a girl by the Kohorochiwetari, a tribe of the Yanomami indigenous people, living in the Amazon rainforest on the border between Venezuela and Brazil. She lived with the Yanomami for about two decades (variously given as 20, 22, or 24 years). While living with the Yanoama, Valero married twice and gave birth to four children (three sons and one daughter). She escaped in 1956 to what she refers to as "the white man" in the country of her birth. After rejection by her family and living in poverty at a mission, Valero chose to return to life with the Yanomami and lived with them until her death in 2002.

Valero recounted her life's story to Italian biologist and anthropologist Ettore Biocca, who published the account in 1965. In the book, Valero tells of life in the forest: hunter-gatherer living in the Amazon; the customs, lore, rituals, and observances of Yanomami culture; and the relationships and wars between individuals, families, and tribes. The book includes detailed information about life in several Yanomami tribes.

According to James Clifford, its authenticity is not questioned by anthropologists.

== Compilation ==
Ettore Biocca, an Italian anthropologist, compiled information about Valero's experience among the Yanoama from tape recordings he made of Valero between 1962 and 1963. Biocca used a three-pronged method: asking the same questions, listening to the same stories several times, and comparing each story to the others. He found no inconsistency.

Biocca also published other volumes of Valero's accounts, which include a great deal of information on the culture of the Yanoama.

== Contents summary ==
=== Part One (from kidnapping to living with the Namoeteri) ===
Helena is a girl of Spanish descent ("white man’s daughter" in the book), who lives next to a river near the Amazon forest with her family of subsistence farmers. When she is a preadolescent (between 11 and 13 years old), the family is attacked by native warriors ("Indians" in the book). She is wounded and her parents leave her behind, carrying her other two younger siblings with them. She is then found by the Yanoama tribe that attacked her family, called the Kohoroshiwetari, and they take care of her.

Another tribe called the Kawawetari demands the Kohoroshiwetari give them Helena. The Kohoroshiwetari refuse to hand her over. As a result, the Kawawetari warriors attack; the men of the Kohoroshiwetari flee, leaving the women and children defenceless. The Kawawetari slaughter the male children, bashing the head of one of the male infants against a rock. They then capture the women and female children, including Helena.

The Kawawetari worry the Kohoroshiwetari will attack them, having killed so many of their sons. However, they never do, but they are later attacked by a tribe called the Shamateri. The Shamateri kidnap Helena and a number of other women and female children, and she lives with the Shamateri for a time. After Helena accidentally gives poisonous toad eggs to a child, the mother of the deceased girl wants the tribe to kill Helena, so she escapes into the forest and subsequently lives there for months.

Eventually, she reaches a tribe called the Namoeteri and approaches them. She initially lives with an older woman who wants her to eventually marry her brother-in-law, once they are both old enough. It is at this point she becomes "of consequence" (starts menstruating) which means she becomes eligible for marriage, but the brother-in-law still is too young, so she remains unmarried for a time. She later makes the mistake of unintentionally insulting Fusiwe, headman of the Namoeteri, and he shoots at her with a bow and arrows. She flees to the forest once again, and is later caught.

=== Part Two (life with Fusiwe, headman of the Namoeteri) ===
After recapture, Fusiwe wants to kill Helena, but his brother-in-law, Rashawe, convinces him not to kill her. Rashawe tells him to take her as his fifth wife, which he agrees to, and she becomes his second youngest wife. Helena also narrates the use of hallucinogenic drugs, her relationships with the other four wives, and political conflicts of the Yanoama. At one point, Fusiwe hits her hard enough to break her arm, after his favorite dog chokes to death on a bone, an incident he blames her for. After the birth of two sons, Fusiwe is killed by an opposing tribe.

=== Part Three (from Akawe to "the white man") ===
After Fusiwe's death, the opposing tribe plots to kill her sons out of fear that they would grow up and avenge their father's death. Helena takes them to a distant tribe that was uninvolved with the concerns of the Namoeteri tribe.

After some time she marries again, this time to a man named Akawe. She bears him two children: a boy and a girl. There her life is not consistent, as she and Akawe often move between villages. Akawe also treats her rather poorly.

Her life is under threat again when the tribe that had killed Fusiwe relocates to live near her. That, combined with her husband's insanity, persuades her to move back among white men.

The last chapter is entitled "The wicked world of the white man." Helena bitterly recounts how nobody takes care of her among the whites, and that she often goes hungry. After a while, Helena decides to return to live with the Yanomami.

== Bibliography ==
- Biocca, Ettore (1970). Yanoama: The Narrative of a White Girl Kidnapped by Amazonian Indians, as Told to Ettore Biocca. New York: E. P. Dutton & Company. ISBN 978-0525238881.
- Valero, Helena; Biocca, Ettore (1996). Yanoáma: the story of Helena Valero, a girl kidnapped by Amazonian Indians. Trans. Luigi Cocco. New York: Kodansha International. ISBN 978-1568361086.
