= Hedu kä misi =

Afterlife in Yanomami mythology

Hedu or Hedu kä misi (literally, "sky layer") is the Ya̧nomamö heaven and in the Ya̧nomamö cosmos the second highest of four layers. The top face of Hedu is like the earth (Hei kä misi) in all ways, containing wildlife, plants and gardens, but instead of living humans the Ya̧nomamö believe it to be the residence of the dead. The activities of humans in Hedu, like the environment there, resembles life on earth in most respects, and the dead eat, hunt, copulate and practice witchcraft, just as living people do.

The bottom face of Hedu is visible from the mortal ground. All celestial bodies, the sun and the moon, the planets and stars, are attached to it and on it chart a regular east to west path.
