= Christina Haverkamp =

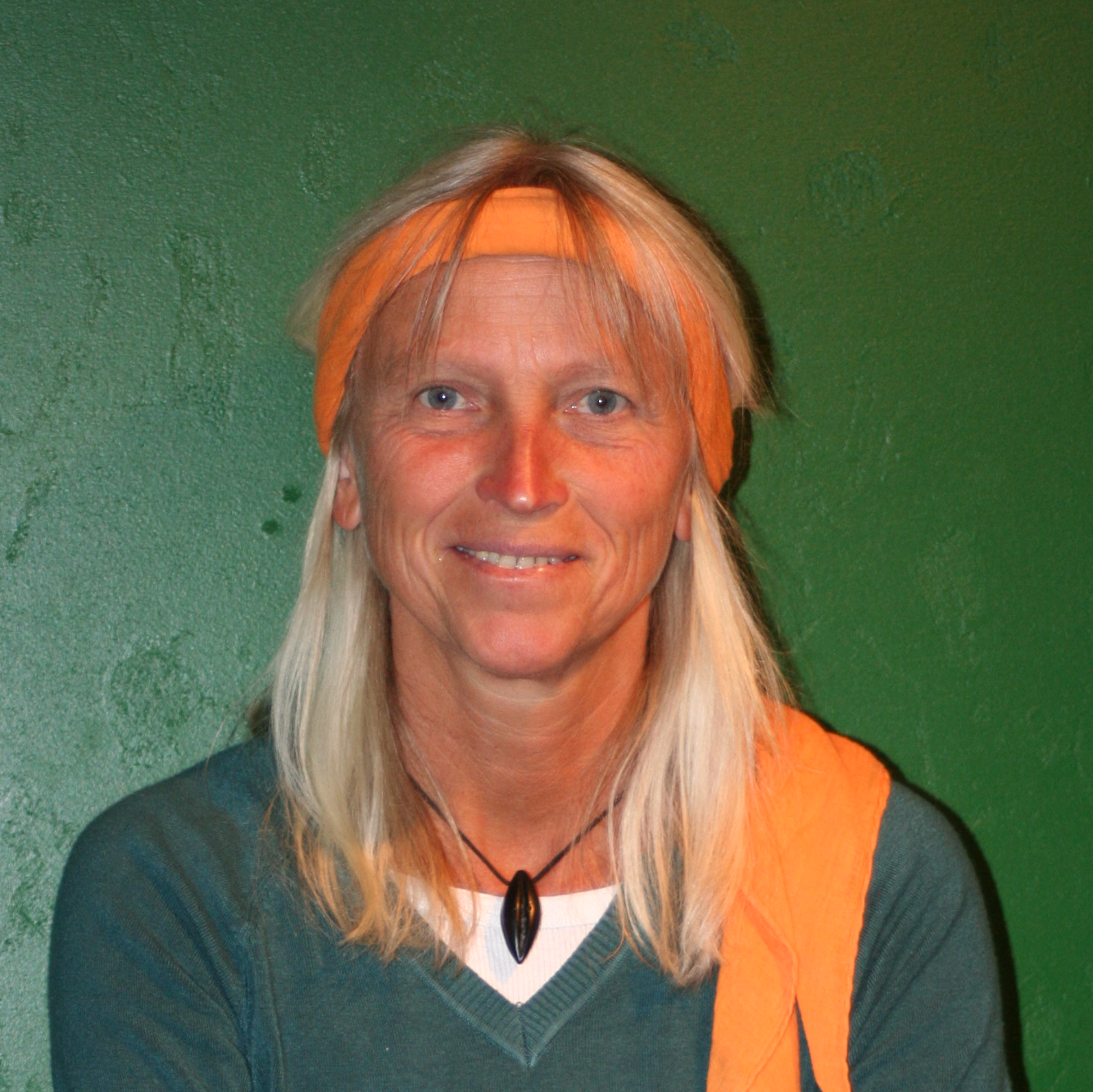
- Haverkamp in 2007
- Born: 6 September 1958 (age 68); Nordhorn
- Education: Teacher of sports and mathematics
- Occupation: Founder of Yanomami-Hilfe eV
- Known for: Human rights activist

Christina Haverkamp (* 6 September 1958 in Nordhorn, Germany) is a German-based human rights activist with special focus on the Yanomami people living in Venezuela and Brazil. She founded the non-profit organization Yanomami-Hilfe e.V. in 2006 to help the indigenous people there. This was after she revoked her association and membership at the Society of Threatened Peoples with the argument that the Society for Threatened Peoples (GfbV) organization had embezzled money and enriched itself by collecting donations meant to help the Yanomami but were not paid out for the allocated Yanomami projects. She gives lectures in schools and universities about human rights and environment.

== Activism ==
In 1992, Christina Haverkamp crossed the Atlantic Ocean on a self-made bamboo raft in order to protest the 500-year anniversary of America's discovery, and to draw global attention to the human rights situation of the Yanomami. In 1997, she built the first medical station upon request of the Yanomami in their village Ixima, in Brazil. 2002 Haverkamp finalized her second medical station in Brazil, upon request of chief Joao Davi Yanomami in his village Papiu. 2005 she constructed the third medical station in Venezuela, in the Orinoco region of Mavaquita. 2011 she finalized her latest medical station in Venezuela, in the remote Orinoco region of Delgado Chalbaud.

Haverkamp enabled chief Joao Davi Yanomami to travel to the United Nations headquarters in order to raise awareness about the plight of his people.

== See also ==
- Rüdiger Nehberg
