= Peter Rose and Anne Conlon =

Peter Anthony Rose MBE (music) and Anne Conlon MBE (words) are British writers best known for their environmental musicals for children. They were both teachers in Lancashire, England, for the majority of their creative achievements and most of their works have been written specially for St Augustine's RC High School, Billington. At the time, Peter Rose was their head of music.

== Notable works ==
Rose and Conlon's first collaboration was The Conversion Job (1980–1); a currently unpublished musical which told the story of Augustine and his monks as they tried to convert Britain to Christianity. This was first performed at St Augustine's RC High School. Their second collaboration was the choral piece The Kestrel Song (1982), which was later published by their publishers Josef Weinberger (1995). This piece describes

"the thoughts of a kestrel as it hovers above the motorway… From the safety of the sky, the Kestrel watches "all the madness of these men rushing blindly onwards". The fog descends, but the traffic rushes on, until the inevitable disaster happens^{1}"

The Kestrel Song won them the 1982 BBC Pebble Mill – WWF Sounds Natural competition, which brought the writers to the attention of Ivan Hattingh, Head of Development at WWF-UK at the time. Shortly after this, Ivan Hattingh called the writers and asked them to write an extended musical, similar to The Kestrel Song, but about the Amazon Rainforest. Although it seemed an impossible task, they accepted and penned the first half of Yanomamo (1983), which described the beauties of the Amazon rainforest. By the second half, which contrasts the lighter first, the writers explore the human problems that existed in the Amazon basin at the time, and ask strong questions about western attitudes to tribal societies and our role in protecting such important and sensitive natural balances.

Yanomamo is a 90-minute work for chorus, soloists, narrator and stage band, and the original production, performed by the choir and musicians of St Augustine's RC High School, was narrated by Sir David Attenborough and premiered at the Royal Institute, London, before appearing at the Edinburgh Festival. They later performed Yanomamo in America, narrated by Sting, which production was recorded for television and later broadcast (on Easter Sunday, 1989) on Channel 4 under the title of Song of the Forest. The TV version was commercially released by WWF. Since its publication the musical has seen performances by thousands of children throughout the world. This interest was also helped by the inclusion of Yanomamo as part of the BBC Radio Music Workshop series for schools (1991), including a short dramatic script specially written for the series by Conlon. After the TV adaption was broadcast, the school was officially recognised when two of the young soloists were presented to the Duke of Edinburgh and presented with the Ford European Conservation Award in the Royal Opera House, Covent Garden.

Rose and Conlon's next collaboration was in 1985 with Daughters of Pendle. This fully dramatic musical explores 16th-century witchcraft in Lancashire, and was first performed by St Augustine's RC High School. The show is currently unpublished.

After the highly successful Yanomamo, Ivan Hattingh commissioned Rose and Conlon to write another musical, outlining the severe problems of migration from the countryside to the cities in developing countries. African Jigsaw (1986) was written and first performed by the choir and musicians of St Augustine's RC High School at the Barbican Concert Hall, London, narrated by actress Mary Miller and winning a Henry Ford Conservation Award^{2}. African Jigsaw was also performed by the school at the Royal Festival Hall in 1987, this time with Sir Charles Groves and the Philharmonic Orchestra at a Royal Gala charity performance for the homeless. Again, this musical is a 90-minute work for chorus, soloists, narrator and stage band. African Jigsaw was later transmitted as a Splash Special by ITV in 1987, and also part of the ITV Middle English series. Conlon's narration explores the thoughts of one central character; an African mother who has stayed in the countryside whilst her son has started a new life for himself in the city.

Three years later saw their third WWF commission, Ocean World (1990). This time they focused on the problems that threaten the existence of the sea. Ocean World tells the story of a female humpback whale as she journeys to her northern feeding grounds. We are with her at the birth to her first calf, and along her journey we meet other creatures of the deep who have their own problems to contend with. Ocean World premiered at the Royal Festival Hall by the choir and musicians of St Augustine's RC High School and was narrated by Sir David Attenborough. A television version, currently available from WWF-UK, was made and transmitted in 1991 as part of Channel 4's Fragile Earth series. The work follows the same pattern as their previous WWF commissions, and is a 90-minute work for chorus, soloists, narrator and stage band.

Rose and Conlon are also known for writing work with a Christian message. In 1987, they were commissioned to write a Harvest Festival Anthem, "Care for your World", which was performed on BBC's Songs of Praise. Two years later, in March 1989 their hymns were featured in The Daily Service on BBC Radio 4.

Rose and Conlon did not collaborate after this until 1996, with the publication of their hymn book Hymns for a Caring World, and their fourth WWF-UK commission Arabica, inspired by a conference Conlon attended about world economics. Arabica is a musical about the coffee industry and the people involved in the growing, producing and selling of it. This was premiered at the Queen Elizabeth Hall, London, by the choir and musicians of St Augustine's RC High School with narration by actor Burt Caesar. Arabica is arguably the most musically complex of their shows, and most controversial, and has never been broadcast.

There was question whether they would write another large-scale musical after Arabica, but in 2000 they wrote Song of Creation to celebrate the millennium. Song of Creation, unlike their WWF musicals, was written for the catholic charity CAFOD, and premiered at the Royal Festival Hall, London. However, they kept their regular blueprint of writing for chorus, soloists, narrator and stage band. The original production of Song of Creation was narrated by Mary Miller, who also narrated their African Jigsaw in 1986.

By contrast to their WWF musicals, Song of Creation has no story as such, yet explores the wonders of creation and of human initiative, at the same time addressing the question of human responsibility for this human drive. Effectively, Rose and Conlon's latest work completes their cycle of environmental musicals by exploring the whole of the world in which we live; the natural balances that occur (which are also explored particularly in Yanomamo with regards to the rainforest), and the linking together of Western and Developing cultures (which is a theme that runs throughout their work, especially in African Jigsaw).

Two new works by Rose and Conlon premiered in 2009. The first, commissioned by Children's International Voices of Enfield, is a smaller piece, Caledonian Shadows, and was performed in London on Sunday 15 March. The second work is a full-length WWF-Commission, One Sun, One World and was performed at the Royal Albert Hall at the end of the year.

They were both appointed Member of the Order of the British Empire (MBE) in the 2016 New Year Honours for services to musical education and conservation.
