= Cuieiras River (Demini River tributary) =

- Location within Brazil
- Native name: Rio Cuieiras (Portuguese)

Location
- Country: Brazil

Physical characteristics
- Source
  - location: Amazonas state
- Mouth
  - location: Demini River
  - coordinates: 0.455070°N 62.725136°W

Basin features
- River system: Demini River

Cuieiras River (Portuguese: Rio Cuieiras) is a river of the Barcelos municipality of Amazonas state in north-western Brazil. It is a tributary of the Demini River.

The river rises near the Serra do Aracá, the mountain after which the 1,818,700 hectares (4,494,000 acres) Serra do Aracá State Park is named, and provides a route to the foot of the mountain.

== See also ==
- List of rivers of Amazonas

== Sources ==
- PES da Serra do Aracá (in Portuguese), ISA: Instituto Socioambiental
