= Darkness in El Dorado =

2000 polemical book

Darkness in El Dorado: How Scientists and Journalists Devastated the Amazon
- Cover
- Author: Patrick Tierney
- Language: English
- Subjects: James Neel, Napoleon Chagnon
- Published: 2000
- Media type: Print
- Pages: 416
- ISBN: 978-0393049220

Darkness in El Dorado: How Scientists and Journalists Devastated the Amazon is a polemical book written by author Patrick Tierney in 2000, in which the author accuses geneticist James Neel and anthropologist Napoleon Chagnon (the author of the 1968 book Yanomamö: The Fierce People) of conducting human research without regard for their subjects' well-being while conducting long-term ethnographic field work among the indigenous Yanomamo, in the Amazon basin between Venezuela and Brazil. He also wrote that the researchers had exacerbated a measles epidemic among the Native Americans, and that Jacques Lizot and Kenneth Good committed acts of sexual impropriety with Yanomamo.

While the book was positively reviewed and well received at first, later investigations by multiple independent organizations found Tierney's main allegations to be false and libelous.

== Major claims and evaluations of these claims ==
Claims made in Darkness in El Dorado included the following:

- Napoleon Chagnon and James Neel directly and indirectly caused a genocide in the region through the introduction of a live measles vaccine that was insufficiently attenuated. This claim has been refuted.
- The Yanomamo project was an outgrowth and continuation of the Atomic Energy Commission's secret program of experiments on human subjects. This claim has been refuted.
- Chagnon's accounts of the Yanomamo are based on false, non-existent or misinterpreted data, and Chagnon incited violence among them. Related claims and ethical issues are still the subject of much academic debate.
- French researcher Jacques Lizot, a protégé of Claude Lévi-Strauss, traded various uncustomary homosexual favors from Yanomamo boys after introducing shotguns and other foreign commodities into the community in what Tierney called "shotgun-driven prostitution". Despite receiving critical support during a subsequent inquiry, these allegations attracted relatively little academic attention.
- The American researcher Kenneth Good married a Yanomamo girl who was barely entering her teens. Good's autobiographical accounts describe a complex personal relationship that developed in the context of Yanomamo (as well as American) cultural norms. He recounts that, in keeping with local customs and community wishes, he was betrothed to his future wife when she was still a child. They consummated the marriage when she was aged about 15 or 16.

== Assessments ==
In 2000, Tierney published Darkness in El Dorado, which accused geneticist James Neel and anthropologist Napoleon Chagnon of exacerbating a measles epidemic among the Yanomamo people, among other damning allegations. This work initially received good reviews and was nominated for a National Book Award. Many of Tierney's accusations against Chagnon were accepted as fact in a New York Times book review by science journalist John Horgan; the resulting political controversy resulted in Chagnon's early retirement. Anthropologist John Tooby of Slate thought the book was internally inconsistent and suggested that it should have been identified as fiction.

Several inquiries related to Tierney's allegations against the researchers were conducted by the American Anthropological Association (AAA) and outside evaluators. Tierney's book was condemned by a number of academic researchers and professional associations, including the National Academy of Sciences, and the American Society of Human Genetics. They concluded that Tierney had fraudulently presented his allegations.

Tierney's charges against Neel and Chagnon were initially investigated by the Peacock Commission, later known as the El Dorado Task Force, formed by the AAA. It supported Tierney and questioned the conduct of Neel and Chagnon; its findings were accepted by the AAA board in May 2002.

Because of dissension within the organization, the AAA subsequently requested an outside investigative team. It said in its preliminary report that the "book appears to be deliberately fraudulent", and that "Patrick Tierney has misconstrued or misrepresented his primary sources to a considerable degree in an effort to support his allegations." The investigators concluded it was not Chagnon who committed any wrongdoing, but Tierney, who fraudulently altered evidence to support a story he either at best imagined or at worst manufactured.

In 2004 Thomas A. Gregor and Daniel R. Gross published their investigation of the AAA's reviews. In 2005 they called for the membership of the AAA to rescind the organization's support of the book. This resolution passed, 846 to 338.

A detailed investigation of Tierney's charges by a panel set up by the University of Michigan found the most serious charges to have no foundation and others to have been exaggerated. The provost's office of the university refuted almost all of Tierney's claims in November 2000. Sponsel and Turner, the two scientists who originally touted the book's claims, admitted that their charge against Neel "remains an inference in the present state of our knowledge: there is no 'smoking gun' in the form of a written text or recorded speech by Neel."

Alice Dreger, a historian of medicine and science and an outsider to the debate, concluded after a year of research that Tierney's claims about Chagnon and Neel were false. She wrote that the AAA was complicit and irresponsible in helping spread these falsehoods and not protecting "scholars from baseless and sensationalistic charges".

The AAA rescinded its support of the book and acknowledged fraudulent, improper and unethical conduct by Tierney. The association admitted that "in the course of its investigation, in its publications, in the venues of its national meetings and its web site, [the AAA] condoned a culture of accusation and allowed serious but unevaluated charges to be posted on its website and expressed in its newsletter and annual meetings" and that its "report has damaged the reputations of its targets, distracted public attention from the real sources of the Yanomamo tragedy and misleadingly suggested that anthropologists are responsible for Yanomamo suffering".

The accusations of inappropriate medical practices contained in Tierney's book were investigated by the Medical Team of the Federal University of Rio de Janeiro and found to be false.

Following the controversy over Darkness in El Dorado, Tierney adopted a low profile, rarely appearing in public to defend his work. According to an investigation done at Dreger's behest, Tierney had no training or employment in anthropology or journalism, but had traveled through South America under a false identity, cheated gold buyers, entered Yanomamo territory without legal permission, carried poisonous mercury into the rainforest, met with murderers, and may have gotten a man killed.

Tierney claimed to rely on a "dossier" of accusations made against Chagnon written by Leda Martins, a Venezuelan anthropologist, but Martins told Dreger that she did not write the dossier; she simply translated it into Portuguese. According to evidence Dreger compiled, the dossier was written by Tierney himself.

== Sources ==
- Borofsky, Robert (2005). Yanomami: The Fierce Controversy and What We Can Learn from It. University of California Press. ISBN 978-0-520-93856-4.
- Hume, Douglas (2016). "Darkness in Academia: Cultural Models of How Anthropologists and Journalists Write About Controversy". World Cultures eJournal. 21. World Cultures eJournal, 21(1).
- Pels, Peter (2005). "'Where There Aren't No Ten Commandments': Redefining Ethics during the Darkness in El Dorado Scandal". In Pels, Peter; Meskell, Lynn (eds.). Embedding Ethics: Shifting Boundaries of the Anthropological Profession. Berg. pp. 69–99. ISBN 978-1-84520-047-3.
