= James V. Neel =

American geneticist

- Born: James Van Gundia Neel; March 22, 1915
- Died: February 1, 2000 (aged 84)
- Education: College of Wooster, University of Rochester (M.D., Ph.D.)
- Known for: Developing understanding of the influence of environment on genes
- Awards: Albert Lasker Award for Basic Medical Research, William Allan Award, National Medal of Science
- Scientific career
- Fields: Human genetics
- Institutions: University of Michigan Department of Genetics

James Van Gundia Neel (March 22, 1915 – February 1, 2000) was an American physician and geneticist who played a key role in the development of human genetics as a field of research in the United States. He made important contributions to the emergence of genetic epidemiology and pursued an understanding of the influence of environment on genes. In his early work, he studied sickle-cell disease and acatalasia. He also conducted research on the effects of radiation on survivors of the Hiroshima atomic bombing.

== Life ==
Neel attended the College of Wooster with a degree in biology in 1935 and went on to receive his M.D. (1944) and Ph.D. at the University of Rochester.

In 1956, Neel established the University of Michigan Department of Genetics, the first department of human genetics at a medical school in the United States. He was elected a Fellow of the American Academy of Arts and Sciences in 1971.

== Controversy ==
=== Theories and allegations ===
Neel first found the inheritance of sickle cell anemia through its genetic basis. This was the first step to learning all of what we know genetically about sickle cell disease. He found that the sickle cell trait itself was heterozygous and the disease was expressed when the gene was recessive homozygous. This was very difficult to figure out at the time with the current knowledge and while he did not find the relationship between malaria and sickle cell himself his work did provide the foundation for it being discovered.

Neel developed the "thrifty gene hypothesis" that paleolithic humans, facing long periods of hunger punctuated by brief periods of food surplus, would have adapted genetically by processing fats and carbohydrates more efficiently during feast periods, to be physiologically resilient during periods of famine. Neel believed that this genetic adaptation might have created a predisposition to type 2 diabetes mellitus. This theory was later discredited by research conducted by Neel himself.

==== Darkness in El Dorado ====
Main Article: Darkness in El Dorado

A journalist by the name of Patrick Tierny published information that discredited Neel in relation to his work in the Amazon with the Yanomami population. He alleged many of things, among which were that he studied the genome of the Yanomami to compare with mutations among the survivors in the atomic bombing in Japan. To that, it was said that unethical practices were performed with the Yanomami population and that radioactive iodine injections were used to find leadership genes from the headmen of Yanomami. These allegations were later to be found without evidence from various examiners.

Neel was especially focused on comprehending the human genome in an evolutionary light. This concept was addressed in his fieldwork, alongside cultural anthropologist Napoleon Chagnon among the Yanomamo and Xavante in Brazil and Venezuela. His involvement in this fieldwork came under scrutiny in the Darkness in El Dorado controversy, a scandal in anthropology that broke in 2000 after his death involving numerous allegations of unethical research that threatened serious damage to Neel's reputation. The accusation is that Neel deliberately injected South American natives with virulent measles vaccine to spark off an epidemic that killed hundreds and probably thousands. However, these claims against him were never substantiated with any evidence, and it was found later that the measles outbreak predated his arrival. Unfortunately, the media saw this as an opportunity for a big story and ran with it giving Neel's name a darkness associated with it. Even the original maker of the measles vaccine Dr. Samuel L. Katz tried to shoot down the allegations claiming that they were in fact not true but was unsuccessful in saving his name before the media tarnished it. The majority of the allegations in Darkness in El Dorado have since been found to have been fabricated by the author.

Among majority allegations against Neel, there is a memo to the Neel family that was made in hopes to clear Neel of all allegations. This can be found here: https://dwhume.com/darkness-in-el-dorado-controversy/0167.htm

Another link to how Neel conducted scientific collaboration in Latin America: https://www.scielo.br/j/gmb/a/MFFkDDXQ9B45Dd3pP4hjRtn/?lang=en

Link to picture of Neel with Yanomamo men in South America: https://diglib.amphilsoc.org/islandora/object/graphics%3A1624

== Organizations ==
Neel was concerned with nuclear fallout and radiation damage. He was active in the Atomic Bomb Casualty Commission and the Radiation Effects Research Foundation. He testified several times before committees and sub-committees of the United States Congress as an expert witness regarding the long-term effects of radiation on human populations.

He was also involved with the American Academy of Arts and Sciences, the American Philosophical Society, the National Research Council, the Pan-American Health Organization, and the World Health Organization.

== Awards ==
- 1960 Albert Lasker Award for Basic Medical Research
- 1965 William Allan Award
- 1974 National Medal of Science

== Works ==
James V. Neel contributed significantly to the development of modern human genetics throughout his career.

His notable works include:

- 1949: "The Inheritance of Sickle Cell Anemia"- Published in Science 110: 64-66, this paper explored how a single gene mutation is responsible for the inheritance of sickle cell anemia. Neel's research and analysis supported the pattern of a mutation occurrence in the hemoglobin subunit β (HHB gene) which is responsible for providing instructions for the creation of the protein β-globin. When this mutation occurs, red blood cells transform into a rigid, "sickle" shape that blocks blood vessels and leads to restriction of blood flow to tissue throughout the body. Neel also discussed how populations with higher rates of malaria correspond with higher rates of sickle cell disease.
- 1967: "The Web of History and the Web of Life: Atomic Bombs, Inbreeding and Japanese Genes"- Published in the Michigan Quarterly Review 6:202-209, Neel discussed the aftermath of atomic bombs in Hiroshima and Nagasaki. He examined the genetic repercussions of radiation exposure on the Japanese population, highlighting the induced genetic mutations due to the atomic bombs. He also delved into how the genetic health of human populations was affected by cultural and societal influences. Neel's research interests aligned with his leadership role in the Atomic Bomb Casualty Commission (ABCC).
- 1994: Physician to the Gene Pool: Genetic Lessons and Other Stories is a book written by James V. Neel, which was published by John Wiley and Sons in New York. In this work, Neel provided many insights into the world of human genetics through lessons and narratives. A collection of stories were intended to both amuse and educate readers about concepts and discoveries ranging from topics of inheritance patterns to consequences of genetic mutations.

== Overall impact ==
James V. Neel was a pivotal figure in the development of human genetics due to his research pursuits, leadership roles, and enduring vestige within the scientific community. From his investigations into the genetic effects of radiation exposure after the atomic bombs in Hiroshima and Nagasaki to his leadership in founding the Department of Genetics at the University of Michigan, Neel has had an undeniable influence in shaping genetic research. His work with Sickle Cell Anemia provided insights into the genetic basis of the disease and its prevalence in populations exposed to malaria.

His prominence was further established by his membership to the National Academy of Sciences and the honor of multiple prestigious awards to recognize his groundbreaking contributions. Beyond his scientific achievements, Neel was an advocate for public health and stressed the importance of looking at genetic differences from an evolutionary angle. He made it known that we as a society should look at the bigger picture referencing genetic changes and genetic research should consider both biology and evolution.

Through his legacy, Neel continues to shape the trajectory of genetic research in humans and inspires future geneticists.
