= Hei kä misi =

In the Ya̧nomamö cosmos, Hei kä misi (literally, "this layer") is earth and the third highest of four vertically parallel layers. The Ya̧nomamö believe that Hei kä misi was created when a part of Hedu kä misi (Heaven) got dislodged and fell.
