= Kenneth Good (anthropologist) =

American anthropologist (born 1942)

Kenneth Robert Good
- Born: September 4, 1942 (age 83); Philadelphia, Pennsylvania, U.S.
- Education: Pennsylvania State University; University of Florida
- Children: David Good
- Scientific career
- Fields: Anthropology
- Workplaces: New Jersey City University
- Thesis: Yanomami hunting patterns: Trekking and garden relocation as an adaptation to game availability in Amazonia, Venezuela (1989)

Kenneth Robert Good (born 4 September 1942) is an anthropologist most noted for his work among the Yanomami and his account of his experiences with them: Into the Heart: One Man’s Pursuit of Love and Knowledge Among the Yanomami (written with David Chanoff). While researching and living with the group in Venezuela, Good married a Yanomami girl named Yarima, who emigrated to the United States with Good when he returned home. Their three children were raised in the United States, but Yarima, finding adapting to life in the United States too difficult, returned to her village when the children were young.

Good is currently associate professor at New Jersey City University. He appeared in the 2010 film Secrets of the Tribe, which documented his work with the Yanomami.

== Personal life ==
Good studied anthropology at the Pennsylvania State University. His graduate study was principally under William T. Sanders, a Mesoamericanist (Master's degree), and Marvin Harris (PhD). Among other members of his PhD committee were Charles Wagley, the acclaimed South Americanist and Robert Carneiro, curator of the American Museum of Natural History now deceased. After several years in Venezuela, Good returned to Pennsylvania State to join the field project of Napoleon Chagnon and began his field study of the Yanomami tribe in 1975. He developed good relations with the tribe and learned the Yanomami language.

In 1978, while he was doing fieldwork for the Max Planck Institute of Munich, Good was offered a wife named Yarima by her brother, the headman of the village. He accepted her in accordance with local customs, and was betrothed to his future wife when she was about 9 years old. They began living near each other and consummated the marriage when she was about 14, as is typical in Yanomami culture. However, the Yanomami people do not record individuals' ages beyond two years, making her exact age difficult to determine; Good himself later revised his original estimate of these ages to be closer to 12–13 and 15–16, respectively. The two lived in the tribal communal house, with Good traveling back and forth to Caracas for one year. Later, Yarima followed Good to the United States where she lived for several years in Gainesville while he completed his Ph.D. before deciding to return to her tribe. The two have two sons and a daughter, all of whom grew up in the United States. His daughter Vanessa was born in her mother's village.

In 2011, one of their sons, David, returned to the jungle to visit his mother and later started a non-profit named The Good Project, dedicated to helping support the future of the Yanomami people.
