= Patrick Tierney (author) =

American writer and mountaineer

Patrick Tierney (born ca. 1959) is an American writer based in Pittsburgh, Pennsylvania, who is the author of three books based on frequent visits to and field research in South America. As a mountain climber, he has worked with Johan Reinhard. He has made discoveries of Inca ceremonial mountaintop sites and, with Reinhard, made the second modern ascent of Mt. Del Veladero (21,115 ft) in Argentina in 1988. An Inca ceremonial platform and sacrificial site was discovered on top.

== Early life and education ==
Tierney was born in Indiana and grew up in Chile and Pittsburgh. His father was an engineering professor. In 1980 he graduated from University of California, Los Angeles with a degree in Latin American Studies.

== Career ==
His first book, The Highest Altar: Unveiling the Mystery of Human Sacrifice (Penguin, New York, 1990), was the result of being sent to do research in South America for Omni magazine between 1983 and 1989. The book discusses theories about Inca human sacrifice, and compares this to human sacrifices in Chile and Peru today. Tierney investigates a human sacrifice in Chile of a young boy, Jose Luis Panecur, as a collective activity by the Mapuche people in 1960. He then investigates other recent sacrifices in Peru. Tierney closes the book by discussing the work of Hyam Maccoby, who put forward a controversial version of Jewish and Christian history. The book received a positive review in the Los Angeles Times. It had been planned as the basis for a National Geographic documentary.

Tierney then published Last Tribes of El Dorado: The Gold Wars in the Amazon Rain Forest (Viking, 1997). The book discusses gold mining operations in the territory of the Yanomami people of the Amazon, alleging killings and severe human rights abuses by independent miners and gold-mining companies.

=== Darkness in El Dorado ===
In 2000 Tierney published his book Darkness in El Dorado, accusing the American anthropologist Professor Napoleon Chagnon and his colleague James V. Neel, among other things, of exacerbating a measles epidemic among the Yanomamö people.

The American Anthropological Association (AAA) convened a task force in February 2001 to investigate some allegations made in Tierney's book. Their report, which was issued by the AAA in May 2002, held that Chagnon had both represented the Yanomamö in harmful ways and failed in some instances to obtain proper consent from both the government and the groups he studied. However, the Task Force stated that there was no support to the claim that Chagnon and Neel began a measles epidemic. Notwithstanding this, in June 2005, the AAA voted by more than two-to-one to rescind its own 2002 report.

Most of the allegations made in Darkness in El Dorado were publicly rejected by the Provost's office of the University of Michigan in November 2000. For example, the interviews upon which the book was based all came from members of the Salesians of Don Bosco, a congregation of the Catholic Church, which Chagnon had criticized and angered.

In 2011, Alice Dreger, an historian of medicine and science, concluded after a year of research that Tierney's claims were false and the AAA was complicit and irresponsible in helping spread these falsehoods and not protecting "scholars from baseless and sensationalistic charges".
