= Shabono =

Temporary homes made by the Yanomami people

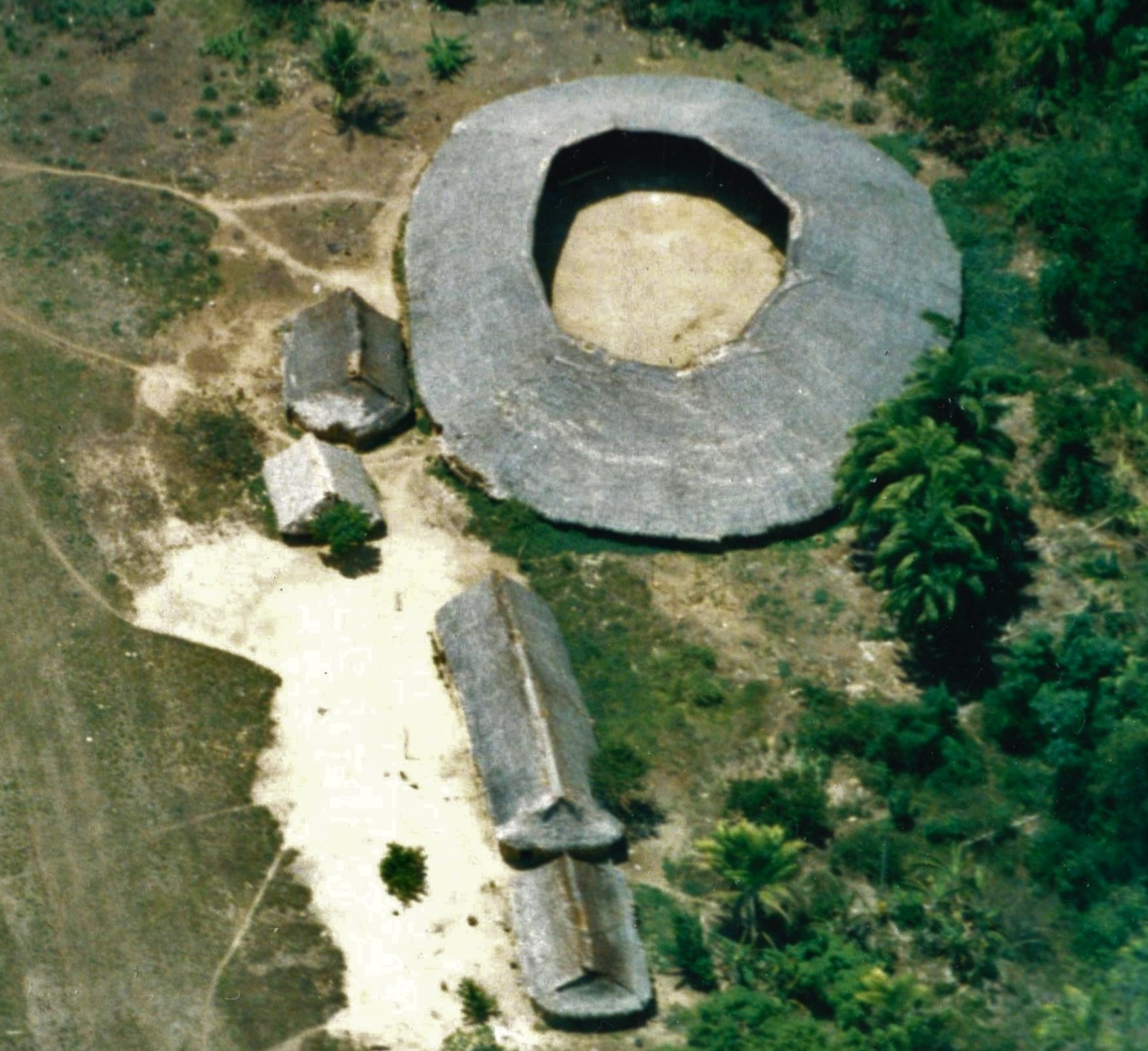
Aerial view of a Yanomami shabono in northern Brazil. Outlying buildings are for the privacy of newlywed couples, or may be used for the preparation of game and fish.

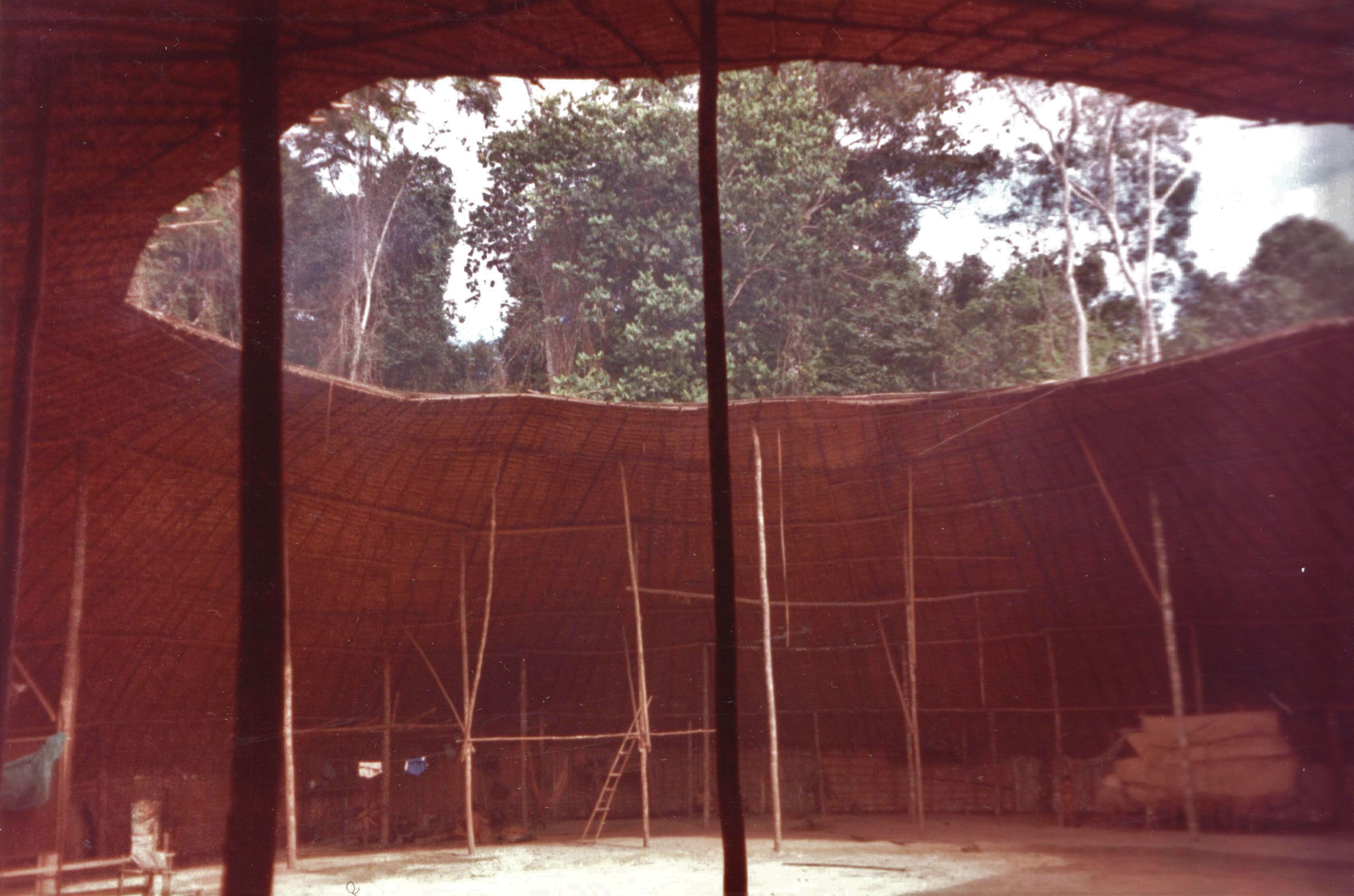
Interior of Yanomami shabono, showing circular structure with separate divisions for each family around a central communal space.

A shabono (also xapono, shapono, or yano) is a hut used by the Yanomami, an Indigenous people in extreme southern Venezuela and extreme northern Brazil.

Used as temporary homes, traditionally constructed mainly of thatched palm leaves and wood, shabonos are built in clearings in the jungle, using the wood cleared to build a palisade with a thatched roof that has a hole in the middle.

In traditional villages, multiple shabonos, each conical or rectangular in shape, surround a central open space. Each family unit has its own area within a given shabono separated by a wooden post. These would be a home for around 50 people.

== See also ==
- Kraal
