= Yanomami =

Indigenous people who live in the Amazonas basin

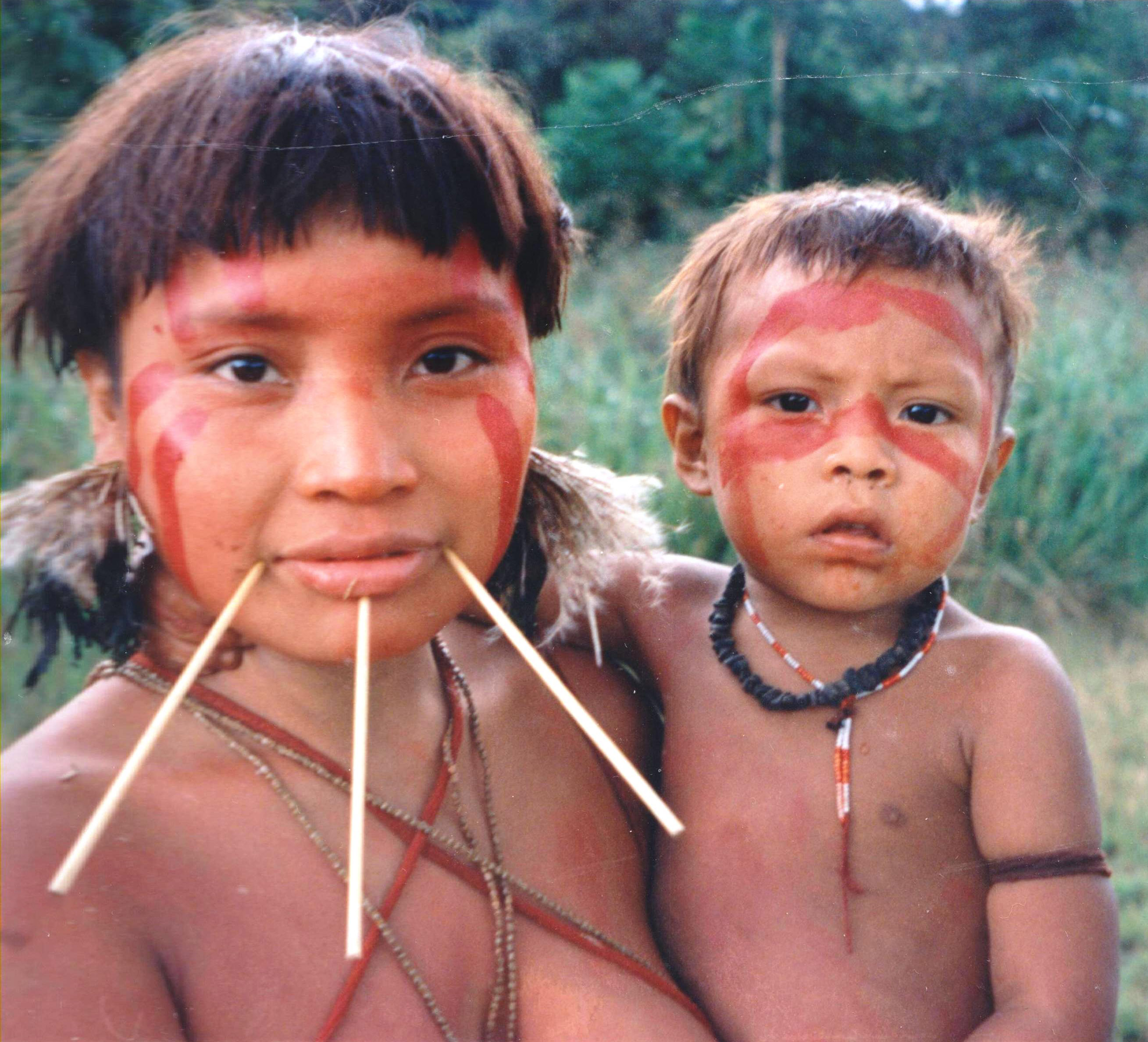
- Yanomami woman and her child, June 1997

Total population
- approx. 35,339

Regions with significant populations
- Venezuela (southeastern): 16,069 (2009)
- Brazil (northern): 19,420 (2011)

Languages
- Yanomaman languages

Religion
- Shamanism

The Yanomami, also spelled Yąnomamö or Yanomama, are a group of approximately 35,000 Indigenous people who live in some 200–250 villages in the Amazon rainforest on the border between Venezuela and Brazil.

== Etymology ==
The ethnonym Yanomami was produced by anthropologists based on the word yanõmami, which, in the expression yanõmami thëpë, signifies "human beings." This expression is opposed to the categories yaro (game animals) and yai (invisible or nameless beings), but also napë (enemy, stranger, non-Indigenous).

According to ethnologist Jacques Lizot:

Yanomami is the Indians' self-denomination ... the term refers to communities disseminated to the south of the Orinoco, [whereas] the variant Yanomawi is used to refer to communities north of the Orinoco. The term Sanumá corresponds to a dialect reserved for a cultural subgroup, much influenced by the neighboring Ye'kuana people. Other denominations applied to the Yanomami include Waika or Waica, Guiaca, Shiriana, Shirishana, Guaharibo or Guajaribo, Yanoama, Ninam, and Xamatari or Shamatari.

Yanomamö and Yanomama are variant spellings. Supporters of the work on the tribe of anthropologist Napoleon Chagnon usually use Yanomamö. Those who oppose his work or are neutral usually use Yanomami or Yanomama.

== History ==
The first report of the Yanomami is from 1654, when a Spanish expedition under Apolinar Diaz de la Fuente visited some Ye'kuana people living on the Padamo River. Diaz wrote:

By interlocution of an Uramanavi Indian, I asked Chief Yoni if he had navigated by the Orinoco to its headwaters; he replied yes, and that he had gone to make war against the Guaharibo [Yanomami] Indians, who were very brave ... and who will not be friends with any kind of Indian.

From approximately 1630 to 1720, the other river-based indigenous societies who lived in the same region were wiped out or reduced as a result of slave-hunting expeditions by the conquistadors and bandeirantes. In 2004, journalist Charles C. Mann suggested that the Yanomami descend from farmers who fled those expeditions and pressure from European expansion. Sustained contact with the outside world began in the 1950s with the arrival of members of the New Tribes Mission as well as Catholic missionaries from the Society of Jesus and Salesians of Don Bosco.

In Roraima, the 1970s saw the implementation of development projects within the framework of the "National Integration Plan" launched by the Brazilian military governments of the time. This meant the opening of a stretch of perimeter road (1973–76) and various colonization programs on land traditionally occupied by the Yanomami. During the same period, the Amazonian resources survey project RADAM (1975) detected important mineral deposits in the region. This triggered a progressive movement of gold prospectors, which after 1987 took the form of a real gold rush. Hundreds of clandestine runways were opened by gold miners in the major tributaries of the Branco River between 1987 and 1990. The number of gold miners in the Yanomami area of Roraima was then estimated at 30 to 40 thousand, about five times the indigenous population resident there. Although the intensity of this gold rush has subsided greatly since 1990, gold prospecting continues today in the Yanomami land, spreading violence and serious health and social problems.

Increasing pressure from farmers, cattle ranchers, and gold miners, as well as those interested in securing the Brazilian border by constructing roads and military bases near Yanomami communities, led to a campaign to defend the rights of the Yanomami to live in a protected area. In 1978 the Pro-Yanomami Commission (CCPY) was established. Originally named the Commission for the Creation of a Yanomami Park, it is a Brazilian non-governmental nonprofit organization dedicated to the defense of the territorial, cultural, and civil and political rights of the Yanomami. CCPY devoted itself to a long national and international campaign to inform and sensitize public opinion and put pressure on the Brazilian government to demarcate an area suited to the needs of the Yanomami. After 13 years the Yanomami indigenous land was officially demarcated in 1991 and approved and registered in 1992, thus ensuring that indigenous people had the constitutional right to the exclusive use of almost 96,650 square kilometres (37,320 mi^{2}) located in the States of Roraima and Amazonas.

The Alto Orinoco-Casiquiare Biosphere Reserve was created in 1993 with the objective of preserving the traditional territory and lifestyle of the Yanomami and Ye'kuana peoples. However, while the constitution of Venezuela recognizes indigenous peoples’ rights to their ancestral domains, few have received official title to their territories and the government has announced it will open up large parts of the Amazon rainforest to legal mining.

== Organization ==
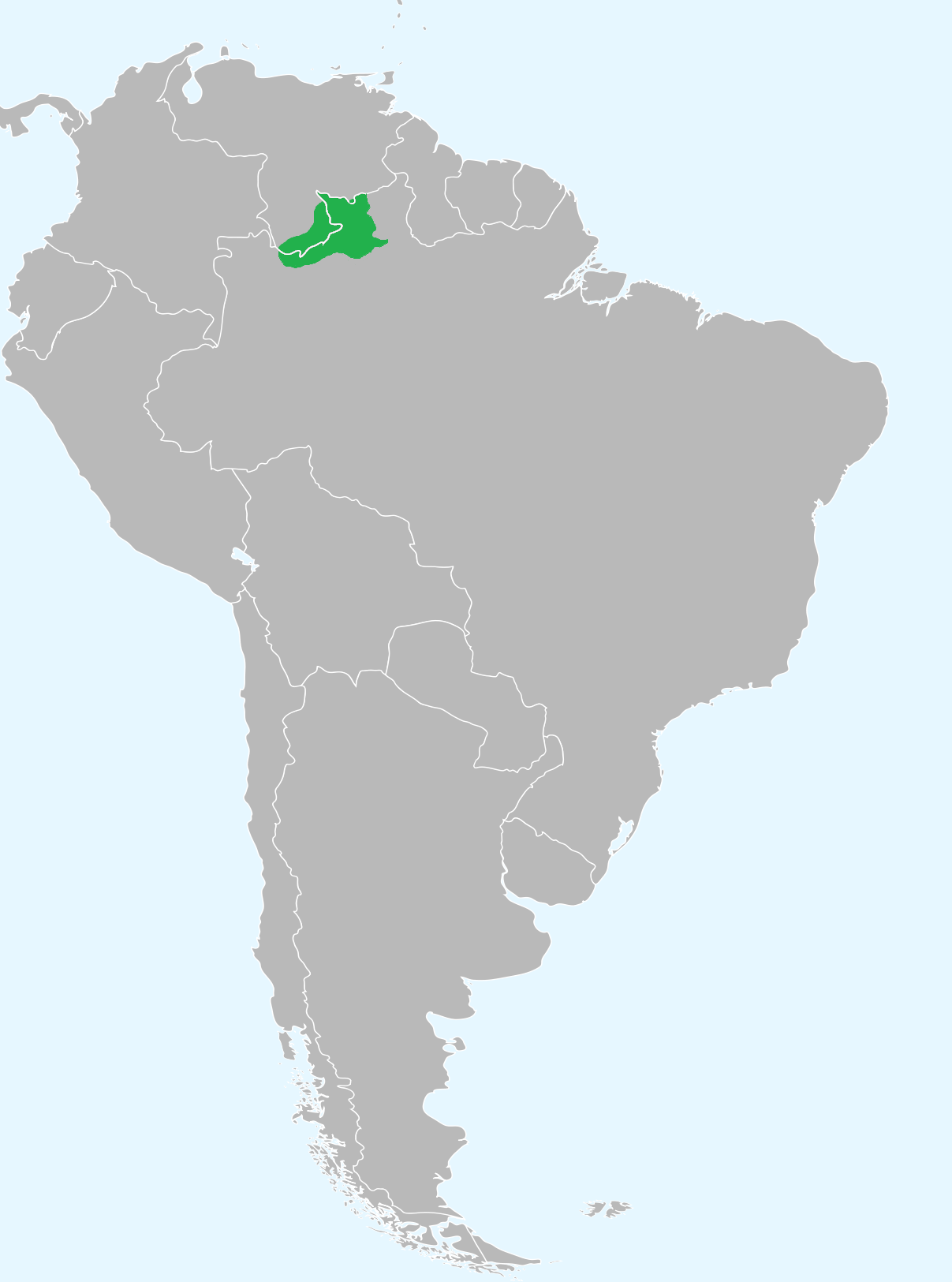
Location of the Yanomami peoples

The Yanomami do not recognize themselves as a united group, but rather as individuals associated with their politically autonomous villages. Yanomami communities are grouped together because they have similar ages and kinship, and militaristic coalitions interweave communities together. The Yanomami have common historical ties to Carib speakers who resided near the Orinoco river and moved to the highlands of Brazil and Venezuela, the location the Yanomami currently occupy.

Mature men hold most political and religious authority. A tuxawa (headman) acts as the leader of each village, but no single leader presides over the whole of those classified as Yanomami. Headmen gain political power by demonstrating skill in settling disputes both within the village and with neighboring communities. A consensus of mature males is usually required for action that involves the community, but individuals are not required to take part. Local descent groups also play important roles in regulating marriages and settling disputes within villages.

== Domestic life ==
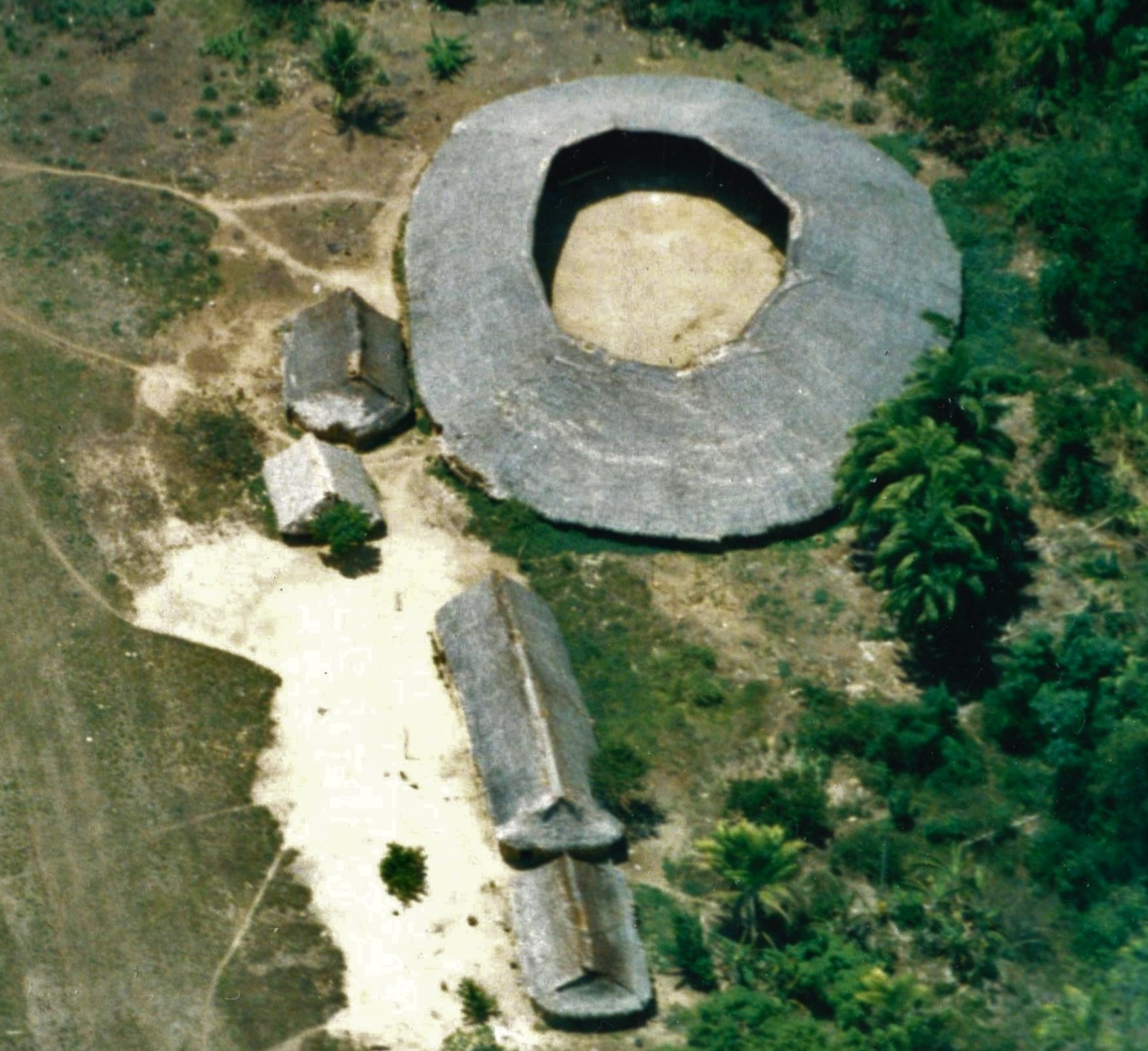
Aerial view of a Yanomami shabono in northern Brazil. Outlying buildings are for the privacy of newlywed couples, or may be used for the preparation of game and fish.

Groups of Yanomami live in villages usually consisting of their children and extended families. Villages vary in size, but usually contain between 50 and 400 people. In this largely communal system, the entire village lives under a common roof called the shabono. Shabonos have a characteristic oval shape, with open grounds in the center measuring an average of 100 yards (91 m). The shabono shelter constitutes the perimeter of the village, if it has not been fortified with palisades.

Under the roof, divisions exist marked only by support posts, partitioning individual houses and spaces. Shabonos are built from raw materials from the surrounding rainforest, such as leaves, vines, and tree trunks. They are susceptible to heavy damage from rains, winds, and insect infestation. As a result, new shabonos are constructed every 4 to 6 years.

The Yanomami can be classified as foraging horticulturalists, depending heavily on rainforest resources; they use slash-and-burn horticulture, grow bananas, gather fruit, and hunt animals and fish. Crops compose up to 75% of the calories in the Yanomami diet. Protein is supplied by wild resources obtained through gathering, hunting, and fishing. When the soil becomes exhausted, Yanomami frequently move to avoid areas that have become overused, a practice known as shifting cultivation. A 2011 study using satellite images found that when Yanomami groups moved around, their old clearings mostly grew back into forest, but groups that stayed in one place had more clearings that never grew back, suggesting that mobility helps the forest recover.

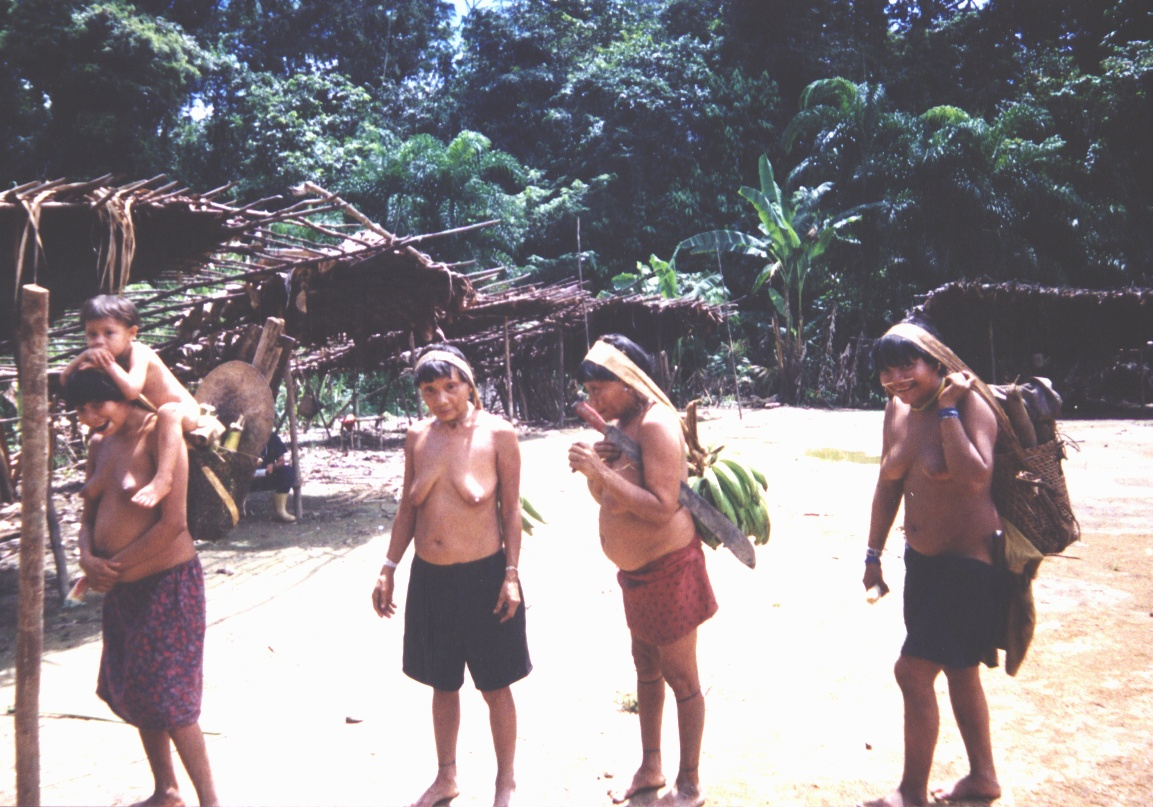
Yanomami women in Venezuela

Children stay close to their mothers when young; most of the childrearing is done by women. Yanomami groups are a famous example of the approximately 50 documented societies that openly accept polyandry, though polygyny among Amazonian tribes has also been observed. Many unions are monogamous. Polygamous families consist of a large patrifocal family unit based on one man, and smaller matrifocal subfamilies: each woman's family unit, composed of the woman and her children. Life in the village is centered around the small, matrilocal family unit, whereas the larger patrilocal unit has more political importance beyond the village.

Men of the Yanomami are said to commit significant intervals of bride service living with their in-laws, and levirate or sororate marriage might be practiced in the event of the death of a spouse. Kin groups tend to be localized in villages and their genealogical depth is rather shallow. Kinship is critical in the arrangement of marriage and very strong bonds develop between kin groups who exchange women. Their kinship system can be described in terms of Iroquois classificatory pattern. To quote anthropologist Napoleon Chagnon, “In a word, everyone in Yanomamo society is called by some kinship term that can be translated into what we would call blood relatives.”

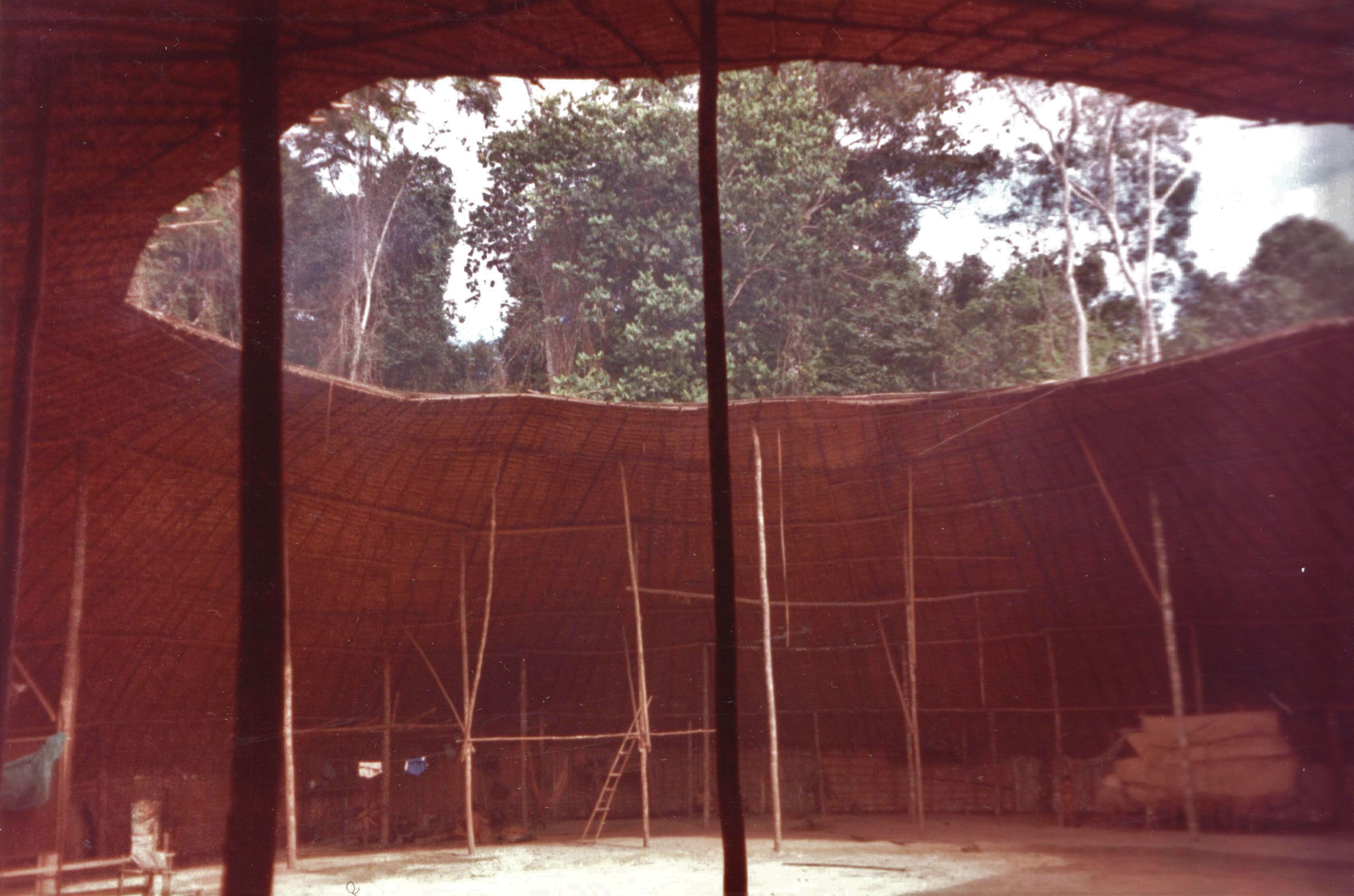
Interior of Yanomami shabono, showing circular structure with separate divisions for each family around a central communal space

The Yanomami are known as hunters, fishers, and horticulturists. The women cultivate cooking plantains and cassava in gardens as their main crops. Men do the heavy work of clearing areas of forest for the gardens. Another food source for the Yanomami is grubs. Often the Yanomami will cut down palms in order to facilitate the growth of grubs. The traditional Yanomami diet is very low in edible salt. Their blood pressure is characteristically among the lowest of any demographic group. For this reason, the Yanomami have been the subject of studies seeking to link hypertension to sodium consumption.

Rituals are a very important part of Yanomami culture. The Yanomami celebrate a good harvest with a big feast to which nearby villages are invited. The Yanomami village members gather large amounts of food, which helps to maintain good relations with their neighbors. They also decorate their bodies with feathers and flowers. During the feast, the Yanomami eat a lot, and the women dance and sing late into the night.

Hallucinogens or entheogens, known as yakoana or ebene, are used by Yanomami shamans as part of healing rituals for members of the community who are ill. Yakoana also refers to the tree from which it is derived, Virola theiodora. Yopo, derived from a different plant with hallucinogenic effects (Anadenanthera peregrina), is usually cultivated in the garden by the shaman. The Xamatari also mix the powdered bark of Virola theiodora with the powdered seeds of yopo to create the drug ebene. The drugs facilitate communication with the hekura, spirits that are believed to govern many aspects of the physical world. Women do not engage in this practice, known as shapuri.

The Yanomami people practice ritual endocannibalism, in which they consume the bones of deceased kinsmen. The body is wrapped in leaves and placed in the forest some distance from the shabono; then, after insects have consumed the soft tissue (usually about 30 to 45 days), the bones are collected and cremated. The ashes are then mixed with a kind of soup made from bananas, which is consumed by the entire community. The ashes may be preserved in a gourd and the ritual repeated annually until the ashes are gone. All of the dead person's personal belongings are also burned, because it is believed that they may harbor some evil spirits. In daily conversation, no reference may be made to a dead person except on the annual "day of remembrance", when the ashes of the dead are consumed and people recall the lives of their deceased relatives. This tradition is meant to strengthen the Yanomami people and keep the spirit of that individual alive. Infanticide is also noted amongst the Yanomami for reasons of disability, adultery, and rape.

The women are responsible for many domestic duties and chores, excluding hunting and killing game for food. Although the women do not hunt, they do work in the gardens and gather fruits, tubers, nuts and other wild foodstuffs. The garden plots are sectioned off by family, and grow bananas, plantains, sugarcane, mangoes, sweet potatoes, papayas, cassava, maize, and other crops. Yanomami women cultivate until the gardens are no longer fertile, and then move their plots. Women are expected to carry 70 to 80 pounds (32 to 36 kg) of crops on their backs during harvesting, using bark straps and woven baskets.

In the mornings, while the men are off hunting, the women and young children go off in search of termite nests and other grubs, which will later be roasted at the family hearths. The women also pursue frogs, terrestrial crabs, or caterpillars, or even look for vines that can be woven into baskets. While some women gather these small sources of food, other women go off and fish for several hours during the day. The women also prepare cassava, shredding the roots and expressing the toxic juice, then roasting the flour to make flat cakes (known in Spanish as casabe), which they cook over a small pile of coals.

Yanomami women are expected to take responsibility for the children, who are expected to help their mothers with domestic chores from a very young age, and mothers rely very much on help from their daughters. Boys typically become the responsibility of the male members of the community after about age 8.

Using small strings of bark and roots, Yanomami women weave and decorate baskets. They use these baskets to carry plants, crops, and food to bring back to the shabono. They use a red berry known as onoto or urucu to dye the baskets, as well as to paint their bodies and dye their loincloths. After the baskets are painted, they are further decorated with masticated charcoal pigment.

== Female puberty and menstruation ==
The start of menstruation symbolizes the beginning of womanhood. Girls typically start menstruation around the ages of 12 to 13. Girls are often betrothed before menarche and the marriage may be consummated only once the girl starts menstruating, though the taboo is often violated, and many girls become sexually active before then. The Yanomami word for menstruation (roo) translates literally as "squatting" in English, as they use no pads or cloths to absorb the blood. Due to the belief that menstrual blood is poisonous and dangerous, girls are kept hidden away in a small tent-like screen of leaves. A deep hole is built in the structure over which girls squat, to "rid themselves" of their blood. These structures are regarded as isolation screens.

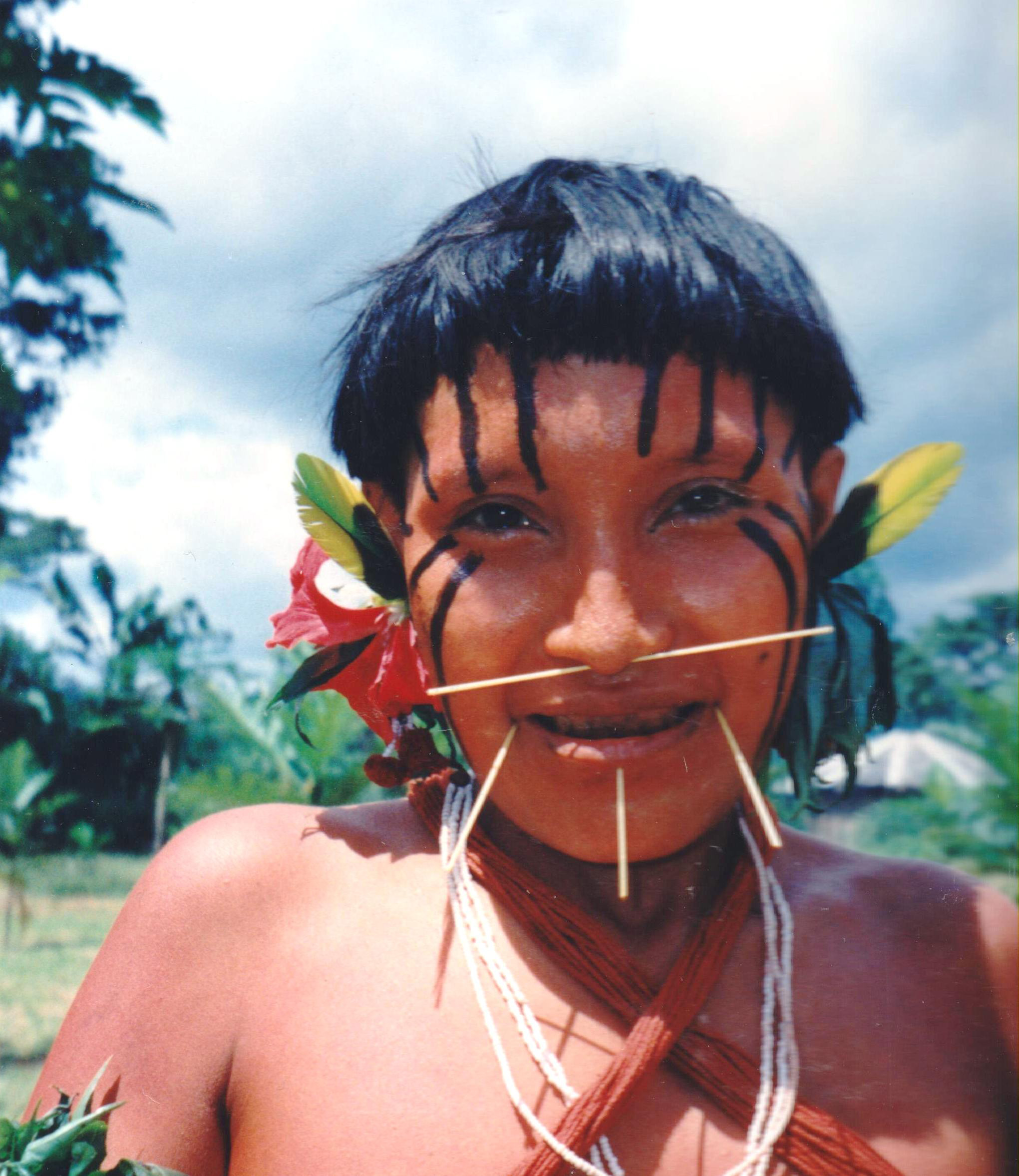
A Yanomami girl at Xidea, Brazil in August 1997

The mother is notified immediately, and she, along with the elder female friends of the girl, is responsible for disposing of her old cotton garments and replacing them with new ones that symbolize her womanhood and availability for marriage. During the week of that first menstrual period, the girl is fed with a stick because she is forbidden from touching food in any way. While in confinement, she has to whisper when speaking, and she may speak only to close kin, such as sisters or her mother, but never to a man.

Until the time of menstruation, girls are treated as children, and are only responsible for assisting their mothers in household work. When they approach the age of menstruation, they are sought out by men as potential wives. Puberty is not seen as an important time period for Yanomami boys as it is for girls. After menstruating for the first time, girls are expected to leave childhood, enter adulthood, and take on the responsibilities of grown Yanomami women. After a young girl gets her period, she is forbidden from showing her genitalia and must keep herself covered with a loincloth.

The menstrual cycle of Yanomami women does not occur frequently due to constant nursing or child-birthing, and is treated as a very significant occurrence only at this time.

== Language ==
Yanomaman languages comprise four main varieties: Ninam, Sanumá, Waiká, and Yanomamö. Many local variations and dialects also exist, such that people from different villages cannot always understand each other. Many linguists consider the Yanomaman family to be a language isolate, unrelated to other South American indigenous languages, while others believe the language of the Yanomami to be part of the Macro-Jê group. The origins of the language are obscure.

== Violence ==
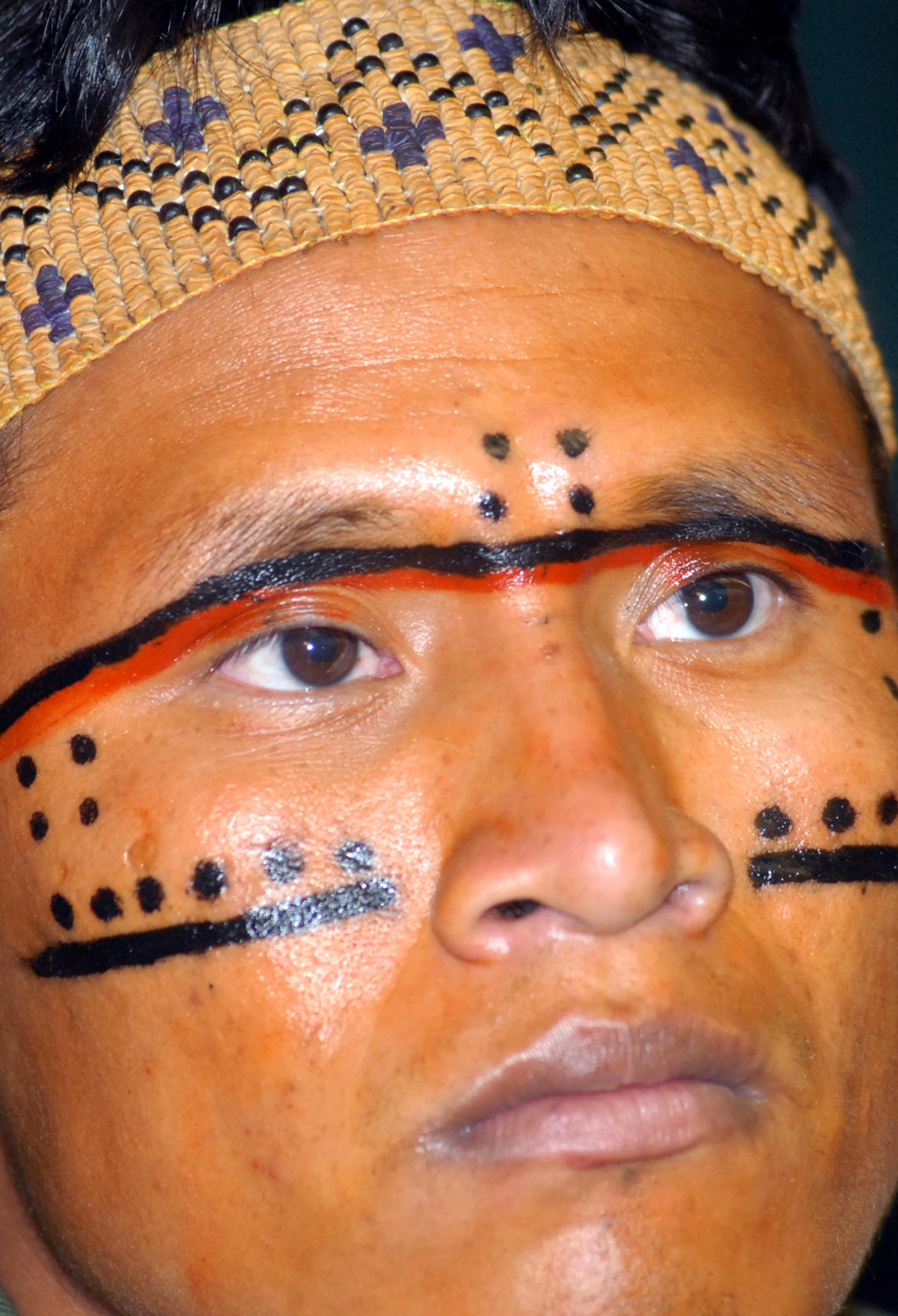
Traditional face painting

In early anthropological studies the Yanomami culture was described as being permeated with violence. The Yanomami people have a history of acting violently not only towards other tribes, but towards one another.

An influential ethnography by anthropologist Napoleon Chagnon described the Yanomami as living in "a state of chronic warfare". Chagnon's account and similar descriptions of the Yanomami portrayed them as aggressive and warlike, sparking controversy amongst anthropologists and creating an enormous interest in the Yanomami. The debate centered around the degree of violence in Yanomami society, and the question of whether violence and warfare were best explained as an inherent part of Yanomami culture, or rather as a response to specific historical situations. Writing in 1985, anthropologist Jacques Lizot, who had lived among the Yanomami for more than 20 years, stated:

I would like my book to help revise the exaggerated representation that has been given of Yanomami violence. The Yanomami are warriors; they can be brutal and cruel, but they can also be delicate, sensitive, and loving. Violence is only sporadic; it never dominates social life for any length of time, and long peaceful moments can separate two explosions. When one is acquainted with the societies of the North American plains or the societies of the Chaco in South America, one cannot say that Yanomami culture is organized around warfare as Chagnon does.

Anthropologists working in the ecologist tradition, such as Marvin Harris, argued that a culture of violence had evolved among the Yanomami through competition resulting from a lack of nutritional resources in their territory. However, the 1995 study "Yanomami Warfare", by R. Brian Ferguson, examined all documented cases of warfare among the Yanomami and concluded:

Although some Yanomami really have been engaged in intensive warfare and other kinds of bloody conflict, this violence is not an expression of Yanomami culture itself. It is, rather, a product of specific historical situations: The Yanomami make war not because Western culture is absent, but because it is present, and present in certain specific forms. All Yanomami warfare that we know about occurs within what Neil Whitehead and I call a "tribal zone", an extensive area beyond state administrative control, inhabited by nonstate people who must react to the far-flung effects of the state presence.

Ferguson stresses the idea that, contrary to Chagnon's description of the Yanomami as unaffected by Western culture, the Yanomami experienced the effects of colonization long before their territory became accessible to Westerners in the 1950s, and that they had acquired many influences and materials from Western culture through trade networks much earlier.

Lawrence Keeley questioned Ferguson's analysis, writing that the character and speed of changes caused by contact with civilization are not well understood, and that diseases, trade items, weapons, and population movements likely all existed as possible contributors to warfare before civilization.

Percentage of male deaths due to warfare in two Yanomami subgroups, as compared to other indigenous ethnic groups in New Guinea and South America and to some industrialized nations

Violence is one of the leading causes of Yanomami death. Up to half of all Yanomami males die violent deaths in the constant conflict between neighboring communities over local resources. Often these confrontations lead to Yanomami leaving their villages in search of new ones. Women are often victims of physical abuse and anger. Inter-village warfare is common, but is less often fatal to women. When Yanomami tribes fight and raid nearby tribes, women are often raped, beaten, and brought back to the shabono to be adopted into the captor's community. Wives may be beaten frequently, so as to keep them docile and faithful to their husbands. Sexual jealousy causes much of the violence. Women are beaten with clubs, sticks, machetes, and other blunt or sharp objects. Burning with a branding stick occurs often, and symbolizes a male's strength or dominance over his wife.

Yanomami men have been known to kill children while raiding enemy villages. Helena Valero, a Brazilian woman kidnapped by Yanomami warriors in the 1930s, witnessed a Karawetari raid on her tribe:

They killed so many. I was weeping for fear and for pity but there was nothing I could do. They snatched the children from their mothers to kill them, while the others held the mothers tightly by the arms and wrists as they stood up in a line. All the women wept... The men began to kill the children; little ones, bigger ones, they killed many of them.

Following the increase in threats and attacks against the uncontacted Yanomami, member of parliament Joenia Wapichana, Dario Kopenawa Yanomami and some other Brazilian indigenous leaders met with Michelle Bachelet, United Nations High Commissioner for Human Rights, to assess the inability of the government to protect their constitutional rights. On September 13, 2021, in her report to the United Nations Human Rights Council, Michelle Bachelet declared that she was "alarmed by recent attacks against members of the Yanomami and Munduruku," in Brazil, "by illegal miners in the Amazon."

== Controversies ==
Gold was found in Yanomami territory in the early 1970s and the resulting influx of miners brought disease, alcoholism, and violence. Yanomami culture was severely endangered.

In the mid-1970s, garimpeiros (small independent gold-diggers) started to enter the Yanomami country. Where these garimpeiros settled, they killed members of the Yanomami tribe in conflict over land. In addition, mining techniques by the garimpeiros led to environmental degradation. Despite the existence of FUNAI, the federal agency representing the rights and interests of indigenous populations, the Yanomami have received little protection from the government against these intrusive forces. In some cases the government can be cited as supporting the infiltration of mining companies into Yanomami lands. In 1978, the militarized government, under pressure from anthropologists and the international community, enacted a plan that demarcated land for the Yanomami. These reserves, however, were small "island" tracts of land lacking consideration for Yanomami lifestyle, trading networks, and trails, with boundaries that were determined solely by the concentration of mineral deposits. In 1990, more than 40,000 garimpeiros had entered the Yanomami land. In 1992, the government of Brazil, led by Fernando Collor de Mello, demarcated an indigenous Yanomami area on the recommendations of Brazilian anthropologists and Survival International, a campaign that started in the early 1970s. Non-Yanomami people continue to enter the land; the Brazilian and Venezuelan governments do not have adequate enforcement programs to prevent the entry of outsiders.

Ethical controversy has arisen about Yanomami blood taken for study by scientists such as Napoleon Chagnon and his associate James Neel. Although Yanomami religious tradition prohibits the keeping of any bodily matter after the death of that person, the donors were not warned that blood samples would be kept indefinitely for experimentation. Several prominent Yanomami delegations have sent letters to the scientists who are studying them, demanding the return of their blood samples. As of June 2010 these samples were in the process of being removed from storage for shipping to the Amazon, pending the decision as to whom to deliver them, and how to prevent any potential health risks in doing so. In 2015 the blood samples were returned and buried by the Yanomami.

In 2000, Patrick Tierney published Darkness in El Dorado, charging that anthropologists had repeatedly caused harm—and in some cases, death—to members of the Yanomami people whom they had studied in the 1960s. This began a heated debate. The book's claims were found to be largely fabricated by Tierney, and the American Anthropological Association in the end voted 846 to 338 in 2005 to rescind a 2002 report on the allegations of misconduct by scholars studying the Yanomami people. In 2010, Brazilian director José Padilha revisited the Darkness in El Dorado controversy in his documentary Secrets of the Tribe.

Illegal gold mining has significantly harmed the Yanomami people’s health and environment. According to a 2023 report, mercury pollution from mining has contaminated rivers, leading to widespread malnutrition and increased disease rates, including malaria.

== Population decrease ==
From 1987 to 1990, the Yanomami population was severely affected by malaria, mercury poisoning, malnutrition, and violence due to an influx of garimpeiros searching for gold in their territory. Malaria, which was first introduced to Yanomami populations by gold miners during the 1980s, is now frequent in Yanomami populations. Without the protection of the government, Yanomami populations declined when miners were allowed to enter the Yanomami territory frequently throughout this 3-year span.

In 1987, FUNAI President Romero Jucá denied that the sharp increase in Yanomami deaths was due to garimpeiro invasions, and José Sarney, then president of Brazil, also supported the economic venture of the garimpeiros over the land rights of the Yanomami. Alcida Rita Ramos, an anthropologist who worked closely with the Yanomami, says this three-year period "led to charges against Brazil for genocide."

=== Massacres ===
The Haximu massacre, also known as the Yanomami massacre, was an armed conflict in 1993, just outside Haximu, Brazil, close to the border with Venezuela. A group of garimpeiros killed approximately 16 Yanomami. In turn, Yanomami warriors killed at least two garimpeiros and wounded two more.

In July 2012, the government of Venezuela investigated another alleged massacre. According to Yanomami organizations, a village of 80 people was attacked by a helicopter and the only known survivors of the village were three men who happened to be out hunting while the attack occurred. However, in September 2012 Survival International, who had been supporting the Yanomami in this allegation, retracted their support, concluding the report was false after journalists taken to the area by the government found that the area was undisturbed and the local Yanomami had not heard of the alleged massacre.

=== COVID-19 pandemic ===
On April 3, 2020, during the COVID-19 pandemic, a 15-year-old Yanomami boy from the Uraricoera River area was confirmed to have COVID-19 and was admitted to the intensive care unit at Roraima General Hospital in Boa Vista, before dying on April 10.

According to the Brazilian Ministry of Health, this was the first confirmed Yanomami death and the third death due to COVID-19 in an indigenous tribe, and raised fears over the virus' impact on Brazil's indigenous peoples. Ten Yanomami children were reported to have died from COVID-19 in January 2021.

=== 2023 national emergency decree ===
In 2023, President Luiz Inácio Lula da Silva accused the government of his predecessor Jair Bolsonaro of having committed genocide against the Yanomami, citing widespread starvation and contamination of water supplies by miners, whose illegal activities were unrestricted under Bolsonaro. The Brazilian Ministry of Health declared a national emergency following reports of deaths among Yanomami children due to malnutrition and disease exposure.

In January 2023, Indigenous health secretary Weibe Tapeba compared the conditions of Yanomami to that of a "concentration camp". Tapeba stated that 20,000 illegal gold miners contaminated the local water supply and fish within and were responsible for causing mercury poisoning.

== Groups working for the Yanomami ==
David Good, son of Yarima and her husband, anthropologist Kenneth Good, created The Good Project to help support the future of the Yanomami people.

UK-based non-governmental organization Survival International has created global awareness-raising campaigns on the human rights situation of the Yanomami people.

In 1988 the US-based World Wildlife Fund (WWF) funded the musical Yanomamo, by Peter Rose and Anne Conlon, to convey what is happening to the people and their natural environment in the Amazon rainforest. It tells of Yanomami tribesmen/tribeswomen living in the Amazon and has been performed by many drama groups around the world.

The German-based non-governmental organization Yanomami-Hilfe e.V. is building medical stations and schools for the Yanomami in Venezuela and Brazil. Founder Rüdiger Nehberg crossed the Atlantic Ocean in 1987 in a Pedalo and, together with Christina Haverkamp, in 1992 on a self-made bamboo raft in order to draw attention to the continuing oppression of the Yanomami people.

The Brazilian-based Yanomami formed their own indigenous organization Hutukara Associação Yanomami and accompanying website.

=== Comissão Pró-Yanomami (CCPY) ===
CCPY (formerly Comissão pela Criação do Parque Yanomami) is a Brazilian NGO focused on improving health care and education for the Yanomami. Established in 1978 by photographer Claudia Andujar, anthropologist Bruce Albert, and Catholic missionary Carlo Zacquini, CCPY has dedicated itself to the defense of Yanomami territorial rights and the preservation of Yanomami culture. CCPY launched an international campaign to publicize the destructive effects of the garimpeiro invasion and promoted a political movement to designate an area along the Brazil-Venezuela border as the Yanomami Indigenous Area. This campaign was ultimately successful.

Following the demarcation of the Yanomami Indigenous Area in 1992, CCPY's health programs, in conjunction with the now-defunct NGO URIHI (Yanomami for "forest"), succeeded in reducing the incidence of malaria among the Brazilian Yanomami by educating Yanomami community health agents in how to diagnose and treat malaria. Between 1998 and 2001 the incidence of malaria among Brazilian Yanomami Indians dropped by 45%.

In 2000, CCPY sponsored a project to foster a market for Yanomami-grown fruit trees. This project aimed to help the Yanomami as they transition to an increasingly sedentary lifestyle because of environmental and political pressures. In a separate venture, the CCPY, per the request of Yanomami leaders, established Yanomami schools that teach Portuguese, aiming to aid the Yanomami in their navigation of Brazilian politics and international arenas in their struggle to defend land rights. Additionally, these village schools teach Yanomami about Brazilian society, including money use, good production, and record-keeping.

== In popular culture ==
- In 1979, Chilean video artist Juan Downey released The Laughing Alligator, a 27-minute documentary of his two-month stay in the Amazon with the Yanomami.
- The Yanomami's reputation for violence was dramatized in Ruggero Deodato's controversial 1980 film Cannibal Holocaust, in which natives apparently practiced endocannibalism, and were engaged in tribal warfare against the neighbouring Yacumo tribe.
- Peter Rose and Anne Conlon, Yanomamo, a musical entertainment published by Josef Weinberger, London (1983).
- Illusionist David Blaine featured the Yanomami in his 1997 television feature Magic Man.
- The 2008 Christian movie Yai Wanonabälewä: The Enemy God featured one of the Yanomami in the telling of the history and culture of his people.
- In 2013, the musician and ethnographer David Toop released Lost Shadows: In Defence of the Soul. It is a collection of recordings of Shamanistic rituals and music of the Yanomami.
- In 2021, “The Last Forest” directed by Luiz Bolognesi features the Yanomami in a documentary/drama, depicting their way of life and struggles with gold prospectors. It notably features indigenous activist Davi Kopenawa Yanomami.
- In the 2017 book, “The Ten Types of Human” by Dexter Dias.

== See also ==
- Tim Asch
- Visual anthropology
- Yanomaman languages
- Yanomamö: The Fierce People
