= Languages of Venezuela =

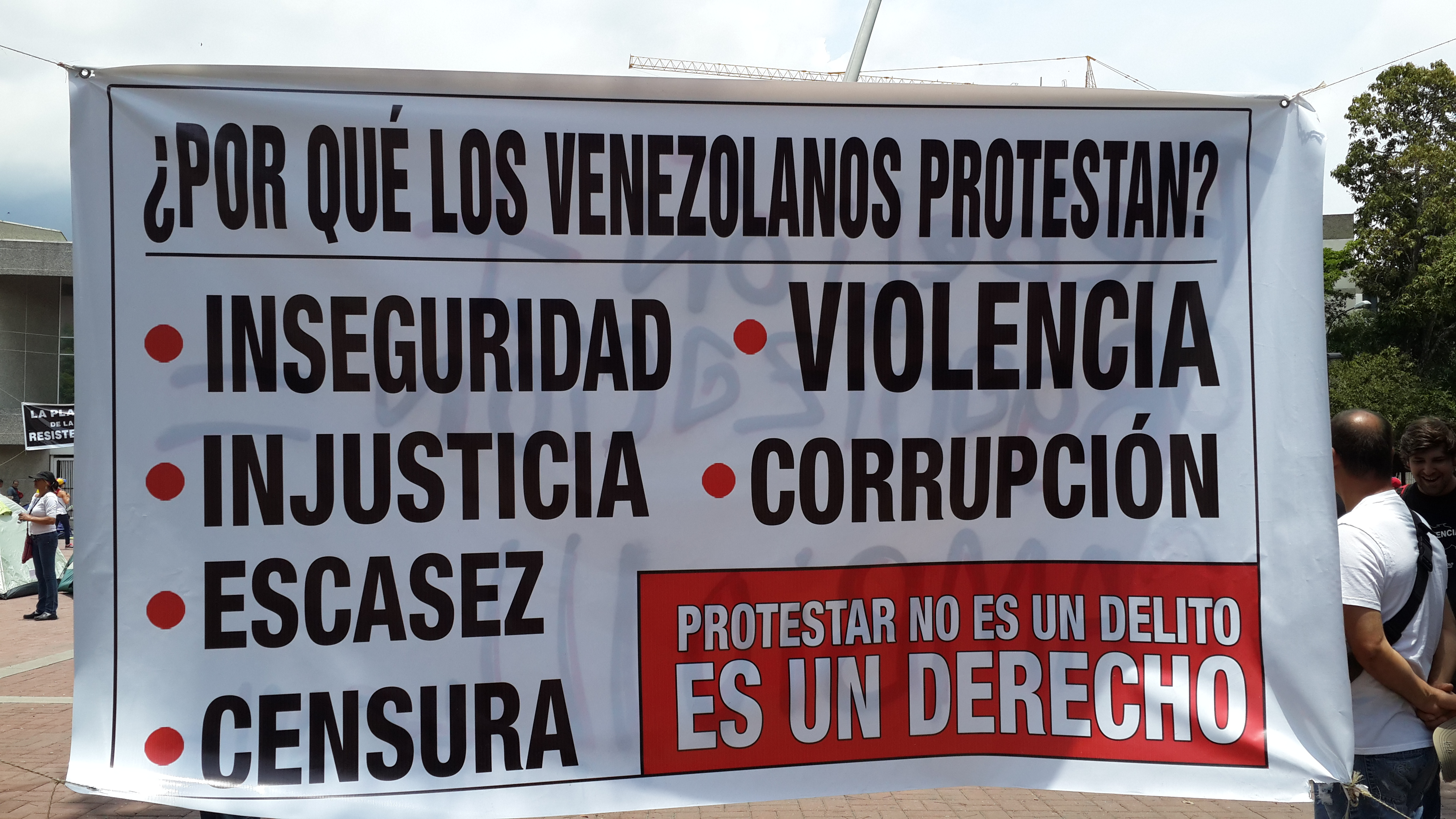
- Sign in Venezuela in Spanish
- Official: Spanish
- Indigenous: Languages of the Arawakan, Arutani-Sape, Cariban, Chibchan, Guahiban, Jirajaran, Timotean families
- Vernacular: Venezuelan Spanish
- Immigrant: German, Colonia Tovar, Italian
- Foreign: English
- Signed: Venezuelan Sign Language
- Keyboard layout: Spanish Latinamerican QWERTY

The languages of Venezuela refers to the official languages and various dialects spoken in established communities within the country. In Venezuela, Castilian Spanish is the official language and is the mother tongue of the majority of Venezuelans. Although there is an established official language, there are countless languages of indigenous villages spoken throughout Venezuela, and various regions also have languages of their own.

There are at least forty languages spoken or used in Venezuela, but Spanish is the language spoken by the majority of Venezuelans. The 1999 Constitution of Venezuela declared Spanish and languages spoken by indigenous people from Venezuela as official languages. Deaf people use Venezuelan Sign Language (lengua de señas venezolana, LSV).

Portuguese (185,000) and Italian (200,000), are the most spoken languages in Venezuela after the official language of Spanish. Wayuu is the most spoken indigenous language with 294,000 speakers.

== Official language ==
According to the Constitution of Venezuela, Castilian (Spanish) is the official language of Venezuela.

The Venezuelan Constitution of 1999 states that:

Article 9. The official language of the country is Castilian. Indigenous languages also hold an official status within their villages and must be respected throughout the Republic, in order to constitute cultural equity of the country and of humanity.

Although Venezuelan Sign Language is not considered an official language, article 81 of The Constitution establishes the right of all deaf people to communicate through VSL, and further establishes in article 101 the right of these people to forms of public and private television in their language.

== Indigenous languages ==
Many of the indigenous languages of Venezuela are threatened and or endangered. The two linguistic families with the highest number of languages are the Arahuacan and the Caribbean.

According to data available from the last indigenous census (1992) and the 2001 general census of population and housing, in Venezuela there are at least 70 indigenous languages that are spoken, of which 40 are grouped into eight linguistic families and the other 30 do not present a recognizable relationship with other languages, and by so they are considered language isolates. Dixon and Aikhenvald considered that the number of distinguishable languages varies around 38 and the number of speakers of indigenous language is closer to 100 thousand although the number of indigenous people is greater than that figure, because many are not competent speakers of the ancestral language of their ethnic group. On the other hand, Ethnologue, whose classification does not always distinguish between dialects of the same language and different languages, distinguishes 43 linguistic varieties in Venezuela.

The majority of the indigenous Venezuelans speak Castilian as a second language.

Following are the number of speakers given by ethnologue (as of 15 February 2024), which distinguishes a greater number of varieties (in parentheses the approximate number of its users) is given.

All languages spoken by the indigenous people of Venezuela are also recognized as official languages and part of the cultural patrimony.

=== Arawak family ===
- Paraujano (1): this language is spoken most prominently in the Sinamaica area. Until recently it was considered extinct, but has gone through a process of revitalization that has been supported by UNICEF.
- Kurripako (2,019)
- Arawak (140)
- Warekena (199)
- Wayuu (294,000): this is the indigenous language with the most speakers in Venezuela. It is spoken in the northern state of Zulia and in the Colombian Guajira. There are also Wayúu communities in other parts of Venezuela.

=== Cariban family ===
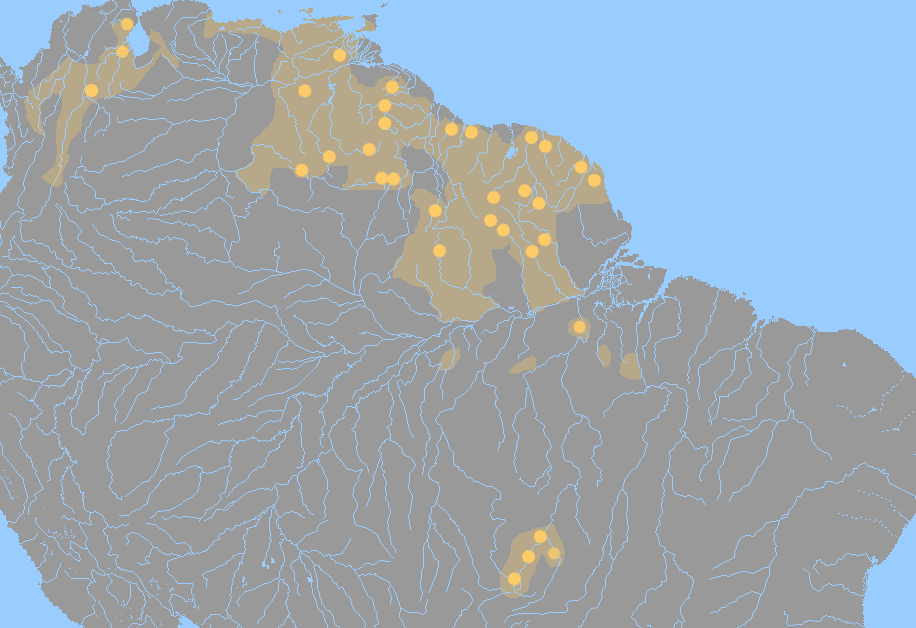
Caribe languages, from 2000.

The majority of these languages are spoken in the southeastern part of Venezuela. In the past, similar languages to these were spoken in a great part of the East Venezuelan coast and the Cuenta del Orinoco.

- Akauayo (180 - from the 2001 census): A spoken language in the state of Monagas and Bolivar in an area bordering on Pemón speakers.
- Eñepá or Panare (4,180): Spoken in the state of Bolívar and the Amazon.
- Japrería (170 - 2002 census): Spoken only in a town in the state of Zulia, in the western part of the country.
- Kariña (4,450 - 2002 census): Spoken in a few municipalities in eastern Venezuela.
- Pemón (23,100): The speakers are primarily in the southeastern zone of the state of Bolívar in the Gran Sabana and its surroundings.
- Wanai or Mapoyo (2?): A language in the midst of disappearing, spoken in the Amazon and very similar to the Yavarana. On November 25, 2014, it was included in the list of Intangible Cultural Heritage of Humanity, in the list with urgent safeguards and it is the first Venezuelan indigenous language declared by UNESCO.
- Yavarana (150): It is a language threatened and disappearing in its spoken form, from the northeast of the Amazon.
- Ye'kuana or Maquiritari (6,200): Its speakers are located in the Northeast state of the Amazon and in the Southeast of Bolívar.
- Yukpa (3,020): This language is spoken in the state of Zulia.

Among the Caribbean languages that are now extinct, since the conquest, are Tamanaco, Cumanagoto and Chaima.

=== Chibcha family ===
- Bari language: It is spoken by approximately 1,520 people of ethnic Barí in Venezuela in 2007.

=== Guajibo family ===
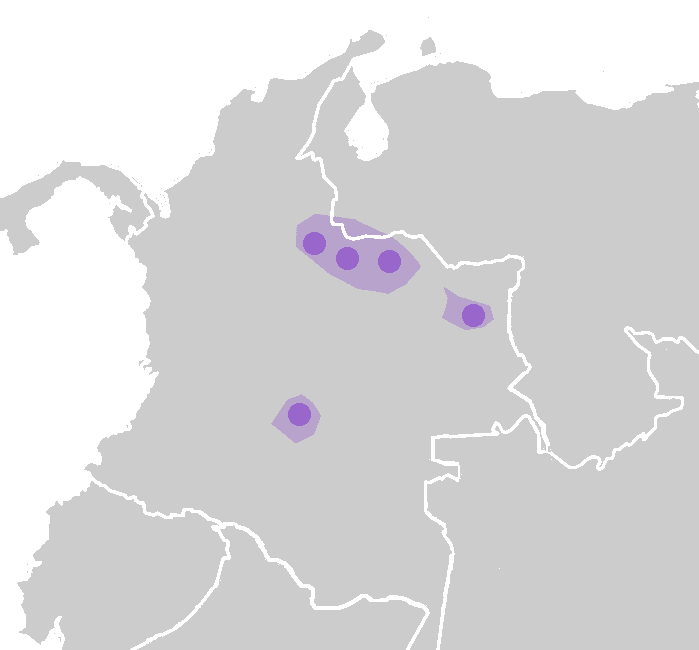
Guajibo languages

- Jivi (12,000) This language is spoken mostly in the state of Apure and the state of Amazon.
- Kuiva (440).

=== Saliva-piaroa family ===
- Sáliva (36)
- Piaroa (13,000)

=== Tupi family ===
- Yeral (few; nearly extinct)

=== Yanomami family ===
Yanomami languages location. Yanomamö Ninam Yanomám Sanumá Ỹaroamë

These languages are spoken by groups in the south of Venezuela and the north of Brazil:

- Yanomamö
- Ninam
- Yanomám
- Sanumá (1.669)
- Ỹaroamë

=== Macro-Maku family ===
The Macro-Makú family is made up by the Nadahup languages, which is widely accepted by Americanists, and by the languages of two relatively isolated hunter-gatherer ethnic groups in Venezuela:

- Puinave (550)
- Joti (1,500)

The experts differ about the classification of these languages, and there are doubts whether these languages should be considered provisionally isolated or provisionally accepted as forming a valid phylogenetic unit with the makúes languages.

=== Other small families ===
The Jirajarana family or Jirajirana is a group of extinct languages that were spoken in the western regions of Venezuela, Falcon and Lara. It is believed that the languages went extinct at the start of the 20th century. The Jirajara languages are considered to be semi-isolates. Adelaar and Muysken point out certain lexical similarities with Timote-Cuica languages, and typological similarities with Chibcha languages. But the limited data does not allow validity to any similarities between the Jirajaran and Betol languages, particularly for the similarities of the ethnonyms.

The Arutani-Sapé family hypothetically would have been formed by the Sapé and the Uruak, which some authors considered it unclassified - isolated languages.

==== Isolated, unclassified, and doubtfully classified languages ====
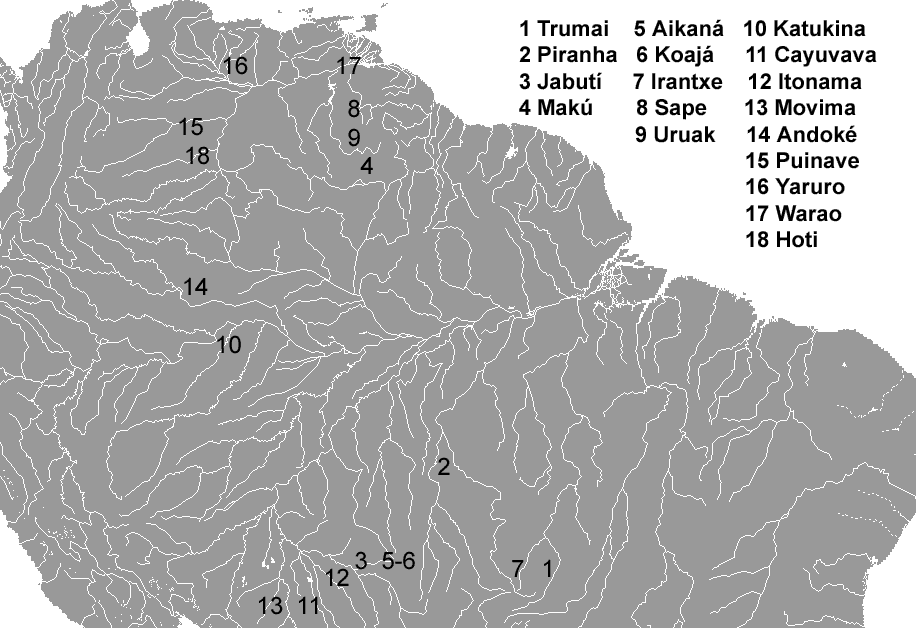
Isolated languages from Brazil, Bolivia, Colombia and Venezuela.

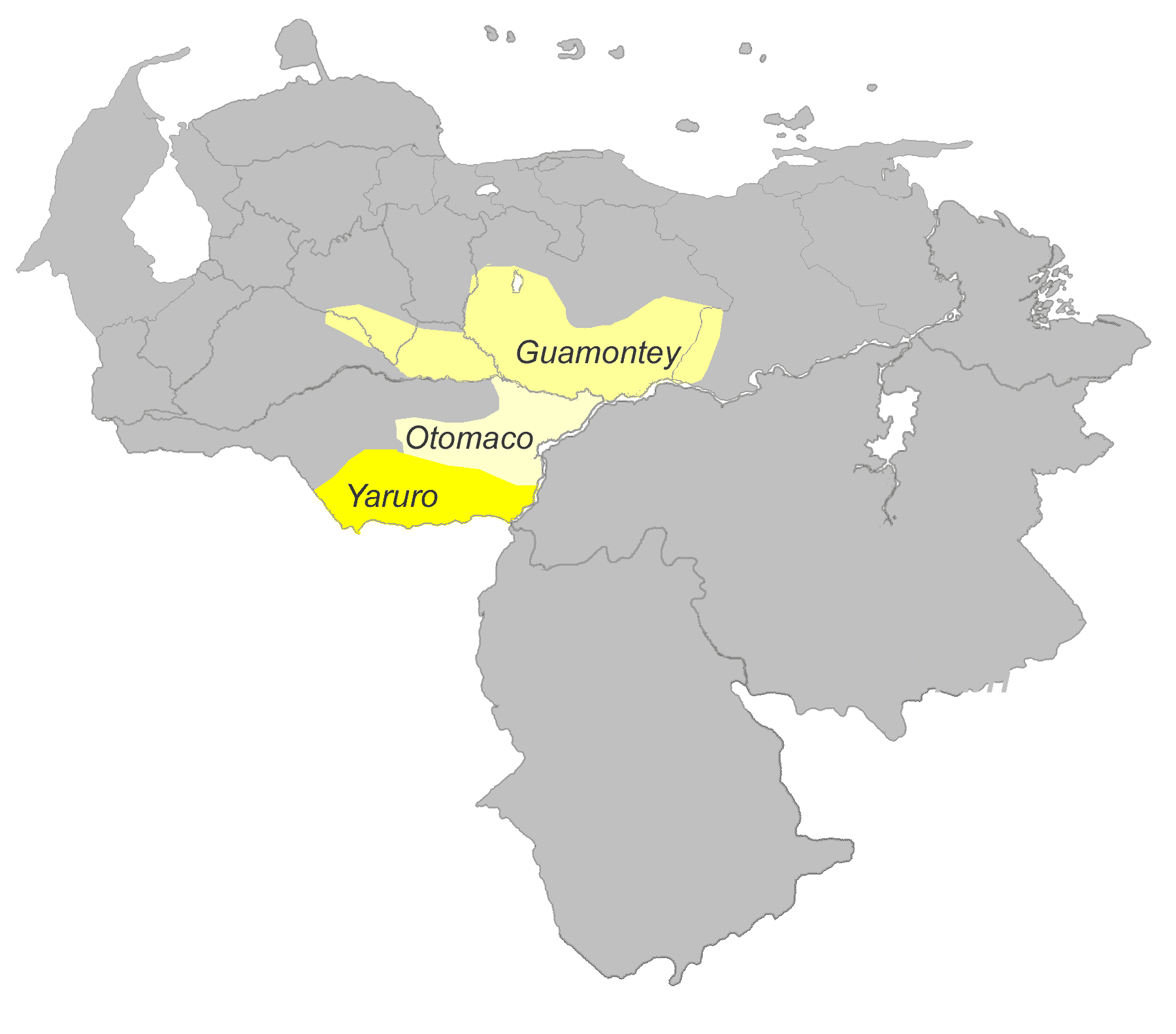
Isolated Languages already extinct from the center and southeast parts of Venezuela. Only yaruro (pumé) is still spoken. The last speakers of Otomaco and Guamo lived in the early 20th century.

Some languages have yet to be classified because they fall under a larger family, these are called “unclassified languages”. For some of these said languages, there exists some oral evidence, but oral history is not convincing enough. For other languages, that are studied and not classified, they fall under the “language isolates” category, meaning that they are considered to be the only member of that family. Here is the list of unclassified languages that fall under larger families:

- Máku (0)
- Pumé (4.061)
- Sapé (25) (arutani-sapé languages ?)
- Uruak (39) (arutani-sapé languages ?)
- Warao (18.696): This language is mainly spoken in the Delta of Orinoco area and some Cercanas regions. It is one of the indigenous languages in Venezuela with the most speakers, after Wayúu and Pemón.
- Guamontey : Extinct language from central Venezuela.
- Otomaco : Extinct language from the central and southern regions of Venezuela.

Below is a non-exhaustive list of the indigenous languages.

Family	Languages	Speakers in Venezuela	Latest ISO code
Arawakan	Piapoco	1033	pia
Arawakan	Baniwa	3460	kpc
Arawakan	Locono	140	arw
Arawakan	Wayúu	170000	guc
Cariban	Pemón	30000	aoc
Cariban	Panare	1200	pbh
Cariban	Yek'uana	5000	mch
Cariban	Yukpa	3285	yup
Cariban	Carib	4450	kar
Cariban	Akawaio	644	ake
Cariban	Japrería	91	jru
Cariban	Mapoyo	2	mcg
Cariban	Yawarana	30	yar
Nadahup	Hodï	750	yau
Nadahup	Puinave	568	pui
Guahibo	Jivi	8428	guh
Chibcha	Barí	2000	mot
Arutani–Sape	Uruak	30	atx
Arutani–Sape	Sapé	30	spc
(isolate)	Pumé	5420	yae
(isolate)	Warao	18000	mis
Piaroa–Saliban	Piaroa	12200	pid
Yanomami	Yanomamö	15700	guu
Yanomami	Sanemá	5500	xsu
Yanomami	Yanam	100	shb
Tupi–Guarani	Yeral	435	yrl

=== Studies of indigenous Venezuelan languages ===
==== From the colonial period until the end of the 19th century ====
The first studies of indigenous languages were carried out by catholic missionaries from Europe. Religious Jesuits, Capuchins and others developed the first forms of grammar and dictionaries of languages such as the Caribbean, Cumanagoto, Chaima and many more.

The friar Matias Ruiz Blanco created in the second half of the 17th century a grammar and a dictionary of the Cumanagoto, as well as a catechism in that Caribbean language.

The Jesuit Gilli conducted extensive studies of the Orinoco language in the mid-eighteenth century. Gilli studied the relation of the different languages and presented the existence of a series of matrix languages or families of languages, that would become one of the foundations of a classification of the South American languages.

The monk Jerónimo José de Lucena, elaborated at the end of that century a vocabulary and translations of catechism of the Otomaco, Taparita and Yaruro languages. Another religious figure, most likely Miguel Angel de Gerona, elaborated on a compendium of the Pariagota language, spoken in Guayana during that century.

Alexander Von Humboldt collected grammar and list of words on his trip to Venezuela in 1799-1800 and with that helped share information about these languages to European Linguists. His brother Wilhelm Von Humboldt used this material in his scientific works about the nature of languages.

In the 20th century, father Basilio María of Barral produced a Warao-Spanish dictionary. The capuchin Cesáreo of Armellada wrote grammar and a dictionary of the Pemón language and compiled tales of the Pemona culture.

In the 1960s, the American Henry A. Osborn conducted some studies on the morphosyntax and phonetics of the Warao language.

Jorge Carlos Mosonyi was one of the most featured scientists at the end of the 20th century in the study of several original languages such as Karina.

Marie-Claude Mattéi-Müller has done extensive work on the Yanomamö, Panare, Mapoyo, Hodï and Yawarana languages. These and other linguists have contributed to the production of the first literacy books for the first Venezuelan nations.

== Foreign languages ==
Languages spoken by immigrants and their descendants are found in Venezuela. The most important are Portuguese (254,000), Italian (200,000), Arabic (110,000), German (20,000) and English (20,000).

Some people who live next to the border of Brazil speak Portuguese. In the areas located near to Guyana, English language is used by some inhabitants, especially on San Martin of Turumban. Colonia Tovar dialect, a dialect of German language, is spoken in the Colonia Tovar.

== Languages taught in schools ==
=== English ===
English is a foreign language with a great demand in Venezuela. It is spoken by many academics and professionals and by some members of the middle and high social classes. There is an English language newspaper in Caracas: The Daily Journal, founded in 1946. The use of English arose in part due to the presence of oil companies from English speaking countries (especially from the United States) since the beginning of the 20th century.

English is taught as a compulsory subject in the secondary education and in the bachillerato for five years. Bachillerato is a segment of secondary education similar to the baccalaureat, secondary school or American high school and is divided into two branches: sciences and humanities. According to the syllabus approved by the Venezuelan Ministry of Education in 1986 English language is considered as a tool to communicate with people from other countries and to obtain information in the areas of humanities, technology and science. For that reason it is taught using a Notional Functional Approach. In the bachillerato a Structuralistic Approach is used. Despite the lines provided by the syllabus, few people learn to speak the language with only the knowledge acquired at school.

In some universities degree programs to train teachers or translators of English language are offered. In the rest of universities English is studied as a compulsory subject to understand texts written in this language.

English is also used in shops and products together with Spanish.

=== Italian ===
In the second half of the twentieth century, more than 200,000 Italians mostly from Veneto moved to this oil rich country.

According to the Italian Embassy in Caracas the "....Italian language is available in a few private Italian schools and institutions. Other similar courses are organized and sponsored by the Italian Ministry of Foreign Affairs and Regional Associations.

=== Portuguese ===
The Portuguese speaking community in Venezuela is very large at 260,000 (especially in Santa Elena de Uairen). As such, serious consideration is being given to include the study of Portuguese as a foreign language in the school curriculums of Venezuela. There are also many Brazilians living in Venezuela. Portuguese has become a very important language of the world economy. Geographically widespread, Portuguese is officially spoken on 5 continents by 270 million speakers, and is the 6th most natively spoken language in the world, and the most spoken language in the Southern Hemisphere.

=== French ===
French language is taught as a compulsory subject in the branch of humanities of the bachillerato or high school for two years. Students learn French grammar in their first year of study, then construct and translate French texts in the second year. In some universities degree programs to train teachers or translators of French language are offered.

=== Latin and Greek ===
In Venezuela Latin is taught as a compulsory subject in the branch of humanities of the high school for two years. Students learn Latin grammar in their first year, then construct and translate Latin texts in the second year.

At university level, the University of the Andes offers a degree program for Letras Mención Lengua y Literaturas Clásicas (Classical Languages and Literatures). In this program (the only one of its type in Venezuela), the students learn Latin, Ancient Greek and the literature of both languages for five years. In other Venezuelan universities, Latin is a compulsory subject of the program for Letras (Hispanic Literature) and Educación, mención: Castellano y Literatura (Education of Spanish language and Hispanic Literature).

Latin and Koine Greek are also taught in Roman Catholic seminaries; the official and spoken language of the country itself and the most spoken European languages Portuguese and Italian evolved from Latin.

== See also ==
- Italian language in Venezuela
- Venezuelan Spanish
