= Bringing Up Baby (TV series) =

British television documentary series

- Country of origin: United Kingdom
- Original language: English
- No. of seasons: 1
- No. of episodes: 4

Production
- Executive producer: Daisy Goodwin
- Production company: Silver River

Original release
- Network: Channel 4
- Release: 25 September – 16 October 2007

Bringing Up Baby is a four-part British television documentary series which compares three different childcare methods for babies: the Truby King method (a strict, routine-based method popular in the 1950s), the Benjamin Spock approach (a more relaxed approach based on parents' instincts, popular in the 1960s), and the Continuum concept (in which babies are in constant contact with a parent at all times, based on tribal child-rearing methods and popular in the 1970s). Each method was advocated and administered by a nanny for two families each. The series was controversial when it aired on Channel 4 in 2007, particularly due to the actions recommended by Truby King advocate Claire Verity, and questions over Verity's qualifications.

== The Methods ==
=== The Truby King method ===
Mentor Claire Verity espoused a routine popular in the 1950s, based on the 1907 book Feeding And Care Of Babies by Truby King: that babies should follow a strict routine from the day they are born, and that parents should dictate this routine, not the other way round. This included a rigid timetable with feeds every four hours, a separate room from the parents from day one, and rules forbidding "unnecessary contact" especially when the babies woke during the night. Verity also recommended that the babies spend several hours per day outside, saying that the fresh air helped them to sleep better.

=== The Benjamin Spock approach ===
Mentor Dreena Hamilton supervised two families (including a single mother) with the approach outlined by Benjamin Spock in his best-selling book The Common Sense Book of Baby and Child Care. The Spock method encouraged parents to use their instincts to detect a child's needs. Sarah Fox, one of the mothers using Spock's method admitted that her son Leon did not sleep as well as she would have liked, but the closer bond between them made following Spock worthwhile.

=== The Continuum concept ===
Mentor Claire Scott had her two families follow the Continuum concept, developed from a study of South American Indians by anthropologist Jean Liedloff. The Continuum concept recommends constant skin-to-skin contact between the baby and its parents until it is twelve months old. The child sleeps in the same bed as the parents, and is carried around in a sling during the day. Grace Collins, who raised her son Oliver using the concept, also praised the bond this method built up between the child and parents, was not too inconvenient and had a positive effect on Oliver's development.

== Controversy ==
The UK's media regulator Ofcom received 752 complaints about Bringing Up Baby, and conducted an investigation which cleared the programme of breaching the broadcasting code. Ofcom found that although some of the techniques portrayed in the series were controversial, they were presented in an appropriate context, and the audience was properly informed of the benefits and disadvantages of each. It determined that Channel 4 had taken due care to ensure the health and wellbeing of the children used as subjects in the experiment, and that the families involved had given clear consent and were free to discontinue their involvement at any time during the filming.

Childcare expert Gina Ford strongly criticised Verity's methods in a letter to the NSPCC, urging them to take steps to ensure that television production companies not continue what she called a form of "child abuse".

The Foundation for the Study of Infant Deaths (FSID) released a statement on its website, expressing concern over Verity's recommendation that a baby sleep in a separate room from its parents from the day it was born. The FSID stated that "Advice on the programme that a baby should sleep in its own bedroom from day one has, in fact, been found to double the risk of cot death."

In addition, questions arose over Verity's qualifications as a maternity nurse. Channel 4 had issued a press release listing a number of qualifications Verity claimed to hold. When The Times newspaper requested a list from Verity's agent, it found the lists differed. Verity claimed to hold diplomas in child daycare and pre-school practice from ASET, qualifications in maternity practice, sleep training and paediatrics from Maternity Nurse Training, and a diploma in childcare from Goal. All three organisations confirmed that they had no record of granting such qualifications to Verity, and Channel 4 conducted an investigation into the claims.

When the series aired in Australia on the ABC1 network in 2009, complaints to the Australian Broadcasting Corporation regarding the controversies in the UK prompted the ABC to broadcast a disclaimer before the second and subsequent episodes of the series:

Disclaimer: Some of the parenting practices advocated by the mentors in this series are not consistent with current, scientifically based, safe sleeping messages and can increase the risks of sudden and unexpected death in infancy including SIDS and fatal sleeping accidents. The ABC advises that the term "maternity nurse" used in this program does not signify a professionally qualified nurse but rather someone with experience in caring for babies and children.
