= Sanima =

Sanima may refer to:

- Sanima people, an ethnic group of Venezuela and Brazil
- Sanima language, a language of Venezuela and Brazil
- Sanima Bank, a Nepalese bank
