= Sanöma language =

Language of Venezuela and Brazil

Sanumá
- Shamatari
- Sanöma
- Pronunciation: [ˈsɑnɨmɑ]
- Native to: Venezuela, Brazil
- Ethnicity: Sanumá
- Native speakers: (5,100 cited 2000–2006)
- Language family: Yanomaman: Sanumá

Language codes
- ISO 639-3: xsu
- Glottolog: sanu1240
- ELP: Sanumá
- Yanomaman languages location Yanomamö Ninam Yanomám Sanumá Ỹaroamë

Sanöma /ˈsænʊmə/ or Sanumá is a Yanomaman language spoken in Venezuela and Brazil. It is also known as Sanema, Sanima, Tsanuma, Samatari, Samatali, Xamatari and Chirichano.

Most of its speakers in Venezuela also speak Ye'kuana, also known as Maquiritare, the language of the Ye'kuana people the Sanumá live alongside in the Caura River basin.

== History ==
Throughout the centuries, the Yanomami, originally from the Parima range, have spread up toward river valleys on the plains both to the south in Brazil, and to the north in Venezuela. The Sanumá speak one of the four known Yanomami languages. It is in the rainforests of north Brazil and south Venezuela that the groups have lived undisturbed until recently. In the last 40 years or so, the western world has been knocking at their doorsteps wanting lumber and gold.

== Dialects ==
There are three dialects spoken in Roraima, Brazil:

- Awaris (2,955 speakers)
- Aracaçá (29 speakers)
- Hokomawä (180 speakers)

== Phonology ==
=== Consonants ===
		Labial	Alveolar	Dorsal	Glottal
Nasal		m	n		
Plosive	tenuis	p	t	k	
Plosive	aspirated		tʰ ⟨th⟩		
Fricative			s		h
Approximant		w	l	(j)	

- /p t k/ may be realized as voiceless [p t k] or voiced [b d g] in free variation.
  - /t/ may also be realized as a tap [ɾ] in free variation.
- /j/ has limited distribution.
- /k/ is lenited [ɣ] intervocalically.
- /k s l/ are palatalized [kʲ ʃ ʎ] before /i/; /l/ is palatalized before /e/ as well.
  - There is an exception in solosama [soloʃama] 'songthrush'.
- In initial positions, /s/ may be realized as an affricate [ts] (or [tʃ] when palatalized).

=== Vowels ===
	Front		Central		Back	
	oral	nasal	oral	nasal	oral	nasal
Close	i	ĩ	ɨ	ɨ̃	u	ũ
Mid	e	ẽ	ə		o	õ
Open			a	ã		

- /ɨ ə/ are written ⟨ö ä⟩.
- /a/ has an allophone of [ʌ] after /m l j/.
- /o/ is realized as [o] or [ɔ] in free variation.
- /e/ is realized as [ɛ] after a palatalized consonant.

== Syntax ==
=== Word order ===
In Sanöma, the subject is placed before the verb or predicate in subordinate and independent clauses.

wale kökö nia-pa-lö-ma. kamisa-nö
peccary 3DU shoot-EXT-FOC-CMPL 1SG-AG
'Peccary got shot. I (shot them)'
