= Yãnoma language =

Language

Yãnoma
- Native to: Brazil
- Region: Roraima
- Ethnicity: Yanomami
- Native speakers: 178 (2019)
- Language family: Yanomam: Yãnoma

Language codes
- ISO 639-3: None (mis)
- Glottolog: yano1269

Yãnoma is a Yanomaman language spoken by one of the Yanomami peoples in the southernmost part of Roraima state, Brazil. It was first reported in Ferreira et al. (2019). Yãnoma is spoken in the lower Catrimani River valley and in the community of Rasasi near Catrimani Mission by an estimated total of 178 people.
