= Gina Ford =

British author

- Born: c. 1960 (age 65–66)
- Occupations: Author, former maternity nurse
- Writing career
- Genre: Childcare
- Notable work: The Contented Little Baby Book

Gina Ford (born c. 1960) is a British author of childcare books in the United Kingdom and a former maternity nurse who has cared for over 300 babies during her career. Ford's 1999 book The Contented Little Baby Book advocates a daily routine for both the baby and the parents, with the day divided up into very precise slots.

== Praise and criticism ==
Criticism of Ford's approach has included that her methods are like "training animals". Some criticism centres around the fact that she herself has no children and however much she learns about and cares for the children of others, having never experienced this as a parent means she lacks some fundamental first-hand experience of maternal brain chemistry changes. The maternal brain chemistry changes involve hormones that allow the mother to be more sensitive to her own infant's wants.

In answer to criticism about her methods she writes, "I would never advise that young babies should be left to cry for lengthy periods of time to get themselves to sleep. I do stress that some overtired babies will fight sleep and they should be allowed 5-10 minutes' 'crying down' period." Ford writes further on this subject in her book.

Critics of her methods include Penelope Leach, Miriam Stoppard and Nick Clegg.

In response to criticism levied against her, Ford suggests that the 25% market share of parenting books that her publications enjoy is proof that her methods do not harm children.

== Projects ==
In 2004, the BBC commissioned a series from Outline Productions called Gina Ford's Baby School, using Big Brother-style methods to oversee the progress of newborn babies. In January 2005, Ford had a meeting with BBC and Outline Productions, and refused to agree to certain reality-style aspects of the format. With only a few weeks before filming, Ford pulled out and was replaced by Dr Tanya Byron.

Five Life commissioned a programme called Gina Ford: Who Are You To Tell Us?, which aired on 4 March 2007.

== Mumsnet libel ==
Ford has threatened legal action against online child and parenting forum mumsnet.com, claiming that users have made "defamatory" comments about her, and has demanded that the whole site be taken down. In May 2007, this dispute was resolved with Mumsnet paying some of Ford's legal costs, but Mumsnet remaining open.

In 2007, she wrote to the National Society for the Prevention of Cruelty to Children and accused child-care expert Claire Verity of "child abuse" for methods used in a Channel 4 series called Bringing Up Baby.
