= Claire Verity =

British baby care professional

- Occupation: Baby care professional
- Known for: Documentary series "Bringing up baby"

Claire Verity is a British baby care professional who specialises in the Truby King method. Her clients have included Jerry Hall and Sting. She featured as a mentor in the 2007 Channel 4 documentary series, Bringing Up Baby (which compared the 1950s Truby King method with the 1960s Benjamin Spock and the 1970s Continuum concept).

Her methods, such as advocating Truby King's tenets of minimal cuddling at bedtime and no eye contact with the baby while preparing the baby for bed, have generated controversy in the media and Blogosphere.

Some critics have called into dispute her professional qualifications and her self-described title of "maternity nurse". In terms of complaints about her 2007 television programme with regards to her qualifications, an official OFCOM investigation concluded that "there is no evidence to suggest that a maternity nurse must have a qualification or belong to any professional body. (...) Therefore, in our view, the description can refer to someone who is 'experienced' in post-birth care both for the baby and the mother"
