= Marie-Claude Mattéi-Müller =

French-Venezuelan anthropologist and ethnolinguist

- Occupations: Anthropologist, ethnolinguist, professor
- Employer: Central University of Venezuela

Marie-Claude Mattéi-Müller is a Franco-Venezuelan anthropologist and ethnolinguist, professor of the Central University of Venezuela. She has published several works about the indigenous languages in Venezuela. Among the languages included in her works are the Yanomamö, Panare, Hodï and Yawarana. In 2009 Mattéi-Müller received the National Prize of Science and Technology, mention on Social Sciences, along Jacinto Serowe.
