= Sanumá =

Indigenous people in Venezuela and Brazil

Sanīma dībī
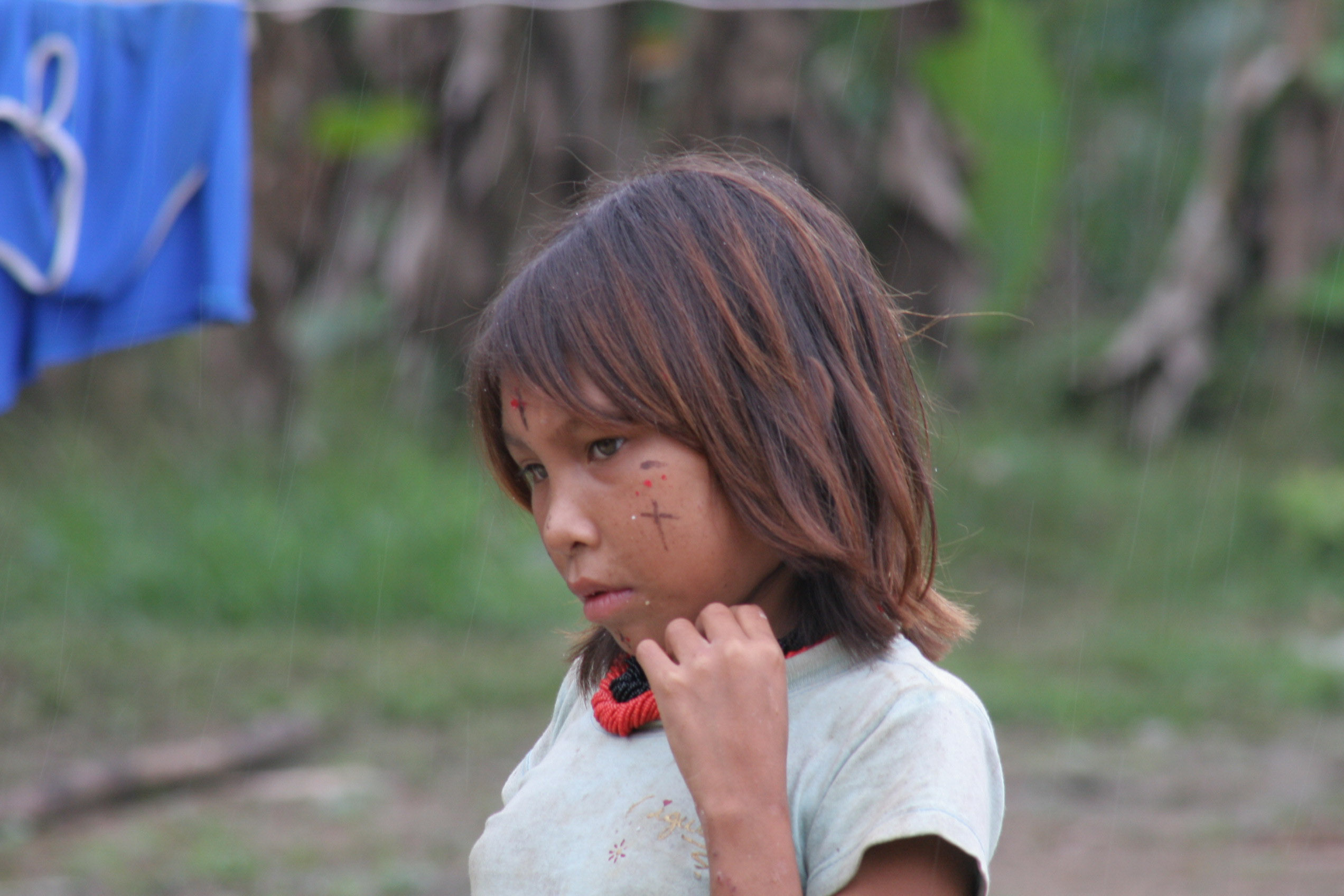
- Sanumá girl

Total population
- 6,410 (1995)

Regions with significant populations
- Venezuela, Brazil

Languages
- Sanumá language

Religion
- Indigenous religion

Related ethnic groups
- Yanomami

The Sanumá, or Sanīma dībī, are an Indigenous people of Brazil and Venezuela. They are related to the Yanomami.

In 1995, the Sanumá numbered about 6,410, with about 3,200 living in Venezuela, and between 900 and 1,000 living in Brazil. In Venezuela, they live in the Caura River and Ventuari River basins where they reside alongside the Ye'kuana.

== Language ==
The Sanumá language is a Yanomaman language.

== Names ==
The Sanumá's autonym is Sanīma dībī, which means "people plural (more than two)" in their Sanumá language. They are also referred to as Sanema, Sanima Tsanuma, Guaika, Samatari, Samatali, Xamatari, and Chirichano in literature.

== Community structure ==
Map of Yanomaman language–speakers. The Sanumá people's territory is marked in red-brown in the northwest.

In Sanumá society, decisions are made by consensus. The village owns land in common.

Historically, the Sanumá settled in villages that they moved every two to three years.

== Conflicts with miners ==
On 24 October 2006, their reserve in Venezuela was invaded by miners who destroyed some of their villages. In retaliation, the Venezuelan army killed 10 miners. This incident led to mass protests by non-Indians in Southern Venezuela.
