= Ỹaroamë language =

Language spoken in Brazil

Ỹaroamë
- Jawari
- Pronunciation: [ɲãɾoˈamɨ], [ʤaˈwaɾi]
- Native to: Brazil
- Region: Roraima
- Ethnicity: Yanomami
- Native speakers: 430 (2015)
- Language family: Yanomam: Ỹaroamë
- Dialects: Opiki; Yawaripë

Language codes
- ISO 639-3: yro
- Glottolog: yaro1235
- Yanomaman languages location Yanomamö Ninam Yanomám Sanumá Ỹaroamë

Ỹaroamë, or Jawari (Jauari), is a language spoken by the Yanomami people in southern Roraima state, Brazil. It was only recently recognized as a distinct language.

Its name Jawari (Yawari, Joari, Yoari, etc.) is shared with the Ninam language.

== Dialects ==
There are two dialects spoken in Roraima, Brazil:

- Opiki (Highland/Serra): in the Serra do Pacu (Catrimani Mission)
- Yawaripë (Lowland/Baixada): in Ajarani and Apiaú

== Phonology ==
The inventory per Ferreira (2011):

Short vowels
	Front		Central		Back	
	oral	nasal	oral	nasal	oral	nasal
Close	i	ĩ			u	ũ
Mid	ɛ	ɛ̃	ə	ə̃	o	õ
Open			a	ã		

Long vowels
	Front		Central		Back	
	oral	nasal	oral	nasal	oral	nasal
Close	iː	ĩː			uː	ũː
Mid	ɛː	ɛ̃ː	əː	ə̃ː	oː	õː
Open			aː	ãː		

- /ə/ is written ⟨ë⟩.

Consonants
	Bilabial	Alveolar	Palatal	Velar	Glottal
Nasal	m	n	ɲ ⟨ỹ⟩		
Occlusive	p	t	tʃ ⟨y⟩	k	
Fricative				x	h
Liquid		l ~ ɾ ⟨r⟩		w ⟨u⟩	

/x/ > [ʃ]/_i
/ə/ > [ɨ]/N_

/t͡ʃ/ and /ɲ/ are cognate to the oral and nasal allophones of /j/ in Yanomam; for this reason they are written ⟨y⟩ and ⟨ỹ⟩ in Yaroame.
