= Jean Liedloff =

American author (1926–2011)

Jean Liedloff (November 26, 1926 – March 15, 2011) was an American author best known for her 1975 book The Continuum Concept. The aunt of writer Janet Hobhouse, she is represented by the character Constance in Hobhouse's book The Furies.

== Biography ==
Born in New York City in 1926, as a teenager she attended the Drew Seminary for Young Women and began studying at Cornell University, but began her expeditions before she could graduate.

During a diamond-hunting expedition to Venezuela, she came into contact with an indigenous people named the Yequana. Over time she became fascinated with the Yequana, and made a decision to return to Venezuela to live with them. She wrote her book, The Continuum Concept, to describe her new understanding of how we have lost much of our natural well-being, and to show us practical ways to regain it for our children and for ourselves. Her book is based on her experiences while living with the Yequana, and discusses in particular their style of child-rearing and its fundamental effect on their later lives.

She was a founding member of The Ecologist magazine.

Liedloff died on March 15, 2011, in Sausalito, California.

== Bibliography ==
- The Continuum Concept: In Search of Happiness Lost ISBN 0-201-05071-4
- Jungle Jean biography by Geralyn Gendreau ISBN 1736791419 (2021)
- When Good Enough Isn't, Mother Blame in The Continuum Concept, Journal of the Association for Research on Mothering, 6(2) by Chris Bobel (2004)
- The Continuum Concept, A Personal Experience Self & Society, An International Journal for Humanistic Psychology 18(4) by Peter Ellis (1990)

== See also ==
- Baby sling
