= Yanomám language =

Yanomaman language of Brazil

Yanomám
- Yąnomamɨ
- Native to: Brazil
- Region: Roraima, Amazonas
- Ethnicity: Yanomami
- Native speakers: 6,000 (2006)
- Language family: Yanomam: Yanomám

Official status
- Official language in: Brazil (Amazonas)

Language codes
- ISO 639-3: wca
- Glottolog: yano1262
- ELP: Yanomam
- Yanomaman languages location Yanomamö Ninam Yanomám Sanumá Ỹaroamë

Yanomám, also Waiká (or Yanomae, Yanomama, Yanomami), is one of several closely related languages spoken by the Yanomami people in Brazil. Most speakers are monolingual. For a grammatical description, see Yanomaman languages.

The names Waika (Guaica) and Yanomami are shared with the Yanomamö language.

== Phonology ==
=== Consonants ===
		Labial	Alveolar	Palatal	Velar	Glottal
Nasal		m	n			
Plosive	tenuis	p	t		k	
Plosive	aspirated		tʰ			
Fricative			s	ʃ		h
Liquid		w	ɾ ~ l	j		

- /ɾ/ may also be realized as [l].
- An epenthetic glottal stop [ʔ] occurs between vowels.
- /p t k/ may be realized as voiceless [p t k] or voiced [b d g].

=== Vowels ===
	Front		Central		Back	
	oral	nasal	oral	nasal	oral	nasal
Close	i	ĩ	ɨ	ɨ̃	u	ũ
Mid	e	ẽ	ə		o	õ
Open			a	ã		

== Bibliography ==
- Ferreira, Helder Perri (2017). Yanomama Clause Structure (PDF). Utrecht: LOT. ISBN 978-94-6093-258-8. Archived (PDF) from the original on 18 April 2021.
- Ferreira, Helder Perri; Machado, Ana Maria Antunes; Senra, Estevão Benfica (2019). As línguas Yanomami no Brasil: diversidade e vitalidade. São Paulo: Instituto Socioambiental (ISA) and Instituto do Patrimônio Histórico e Artístico Nacional (IPHAN). p. 216. ISBN 978-85-8226-076-0.
- G1 (2023-07-21). "Amazonas passa a ter 16 línguas indígenas oficiais; saiba quais são". G1 (in Brazilian Portuguese).
