= Yanomamö language =

One of several languages spoken by the Yanomami people of Brazil

Yanomamö
- Yąnomamɨ
- Native to: Venezuela, Brazil
- Region: Orinoco–Mavaca; Amazonas
- Ethnicity: Yanomami
- Native speakers: (20,000 cited 2000–2006)
- Language family: Yanomam: Yanomamö
- Dialects: Cobari (Kobali)

Language codes
- ISO 639-3: guu
- Glottolog: yano1261
- ELP: Yanomamö
- Yanomaman languages location Yanomamö Ninam Yanomám Sanumá Ỹaroamë

Yanomamö (Yąnomamɨ) is the most populous of several closely related languages spoken by the Yanomami people. Most speakers are monolingual. It has no natively-used writing system.
