= Yeꞌkuana =

Indigenous tribe in present-day Brazil and Venezuela

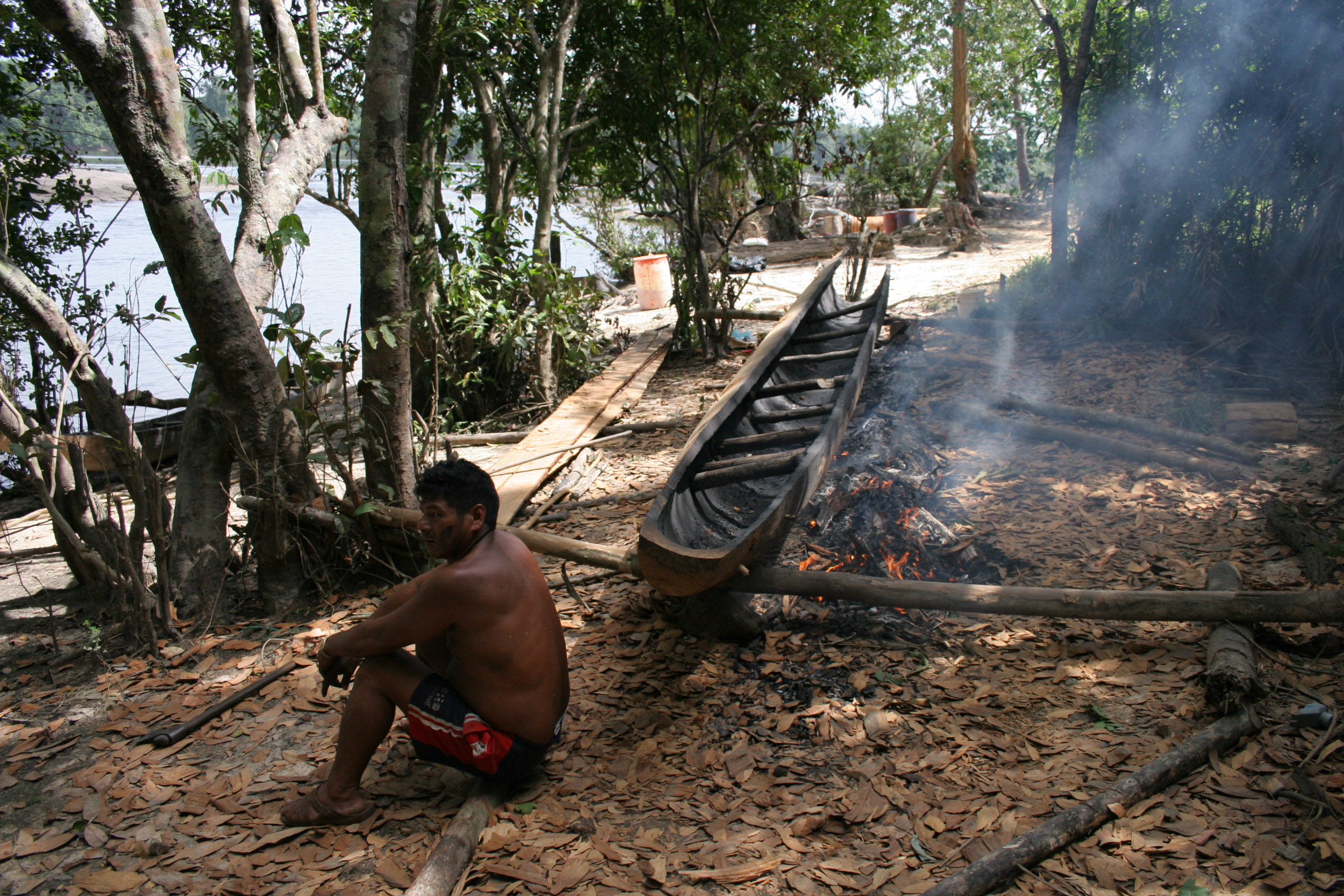

Regions with significant populations
- Brazil; Venezuela
- Brazil: 430
- Venezuela: 6,250

Languages
- Yeꞌkuana language

Religion
- Animism

The Yeꞌkuana, also called Yeꞌkwana, YeꞌKuana, Yekuana, Yequana, Yecuana, Dekuana, Maquiritare, Makiritare, Soꞌto and Maiongong, are a Cariban-speaking tropical rain-forest tribe who live in the Caura River and Orinoco River regions of Venezuela in Bolivar State and Amazonas State. In Brazil, they inhabit the northeast of Roraima State. In Venezuela, the Yeꞌkuana live alongside their former enemies, the Sanumá (Yanomami subgroup).

When the Yeꞌkuana wish to refer to themselves, they use the word Soꞌto, which can be translated as "people", "person". Yeꞌkuana, in turn, can be translated as "canoe people", "people of the canoes" or even "people of the branch in the river".

They live in communal houses called atta or ëttë. The circular structure has a cone-shaped roof made of palm leaves. Building the atta is considered a spiritual activity in which the group reproduces the great cosmic home of the Creator.

The first reference to the Yeꞌkuana was in 1744 by a Jesuit priest called Manuel Román in his travels to investigate the existence of the Casiquiare canal. He recruited the services of the Yeꞌkuana to help him on his way.

The Alto Orinoco-Casiquiare Biosphere Reserve was established by the Venezuelan government in 1993 with the objective of preserving the traditional territory and lifestyle of the Yanomami and Yeꞌkuana peoples. There are some 6,250 Yeꞌkuana in Venezuela, according to the 2001 census, with some 430 in Brazil.

Jean Liedloff came into contact with the Yeꞌkuana in the 1950s, while working as a photographer for Italian diamond-hunters, and in subsequent personal visits. She based her book The Continuum Concept: In Search of Happiness Lost on their way of life, particularly the upbringing of their children. Liedloff noted the stark contrast between the treatment of Western and Yeꞌkuana infants, who are normally held "in-arms" 24 hours a day by their mothers and by other familiar adults and children who take care of them.

== History ==
In Brazil, the Yeꞌkuana are believed to have settled on the lands they now occupy more than a century ago, coming from the larger population centres in Venezuela. Traditional mythology and oral history, however, tells that the lands around the Auari and Uraricoera rivers have long been travelled by the Yeꞌkuana.

During the 18th century, there was a lot of missionary activity in Yeꞌkuana territory, during which they were forced into constructing forts for the Spanish, and coerced into converting to Catholicism. A rebellion was organised against the Spanish in 1776. The 20th century brought a new wave of exploitation in the form of the colonists looking to capitalise on the discovery of rubber. Whole villages were forced into labour, driven in chain gangs to the rubber camps. Later, another wave of missionaries arrived around the early 1960s. The Brazilian Yeꞌkuana decided not to live in the missions established on that side of the border, because the missionaries’ attention in Brazil was focused on the Sanumá and not on them. They were also more reluctant to convert, having seen their Venezuelan cousins convert and become (from the Brazilian Yeꞌkuana perspective) culturally weaker as a result, giving up key elements of their traditional ways of life. On the Venezuelan side of the border, this wave of missionaries brought the establishment of health services, schools, and access to local markets, also creating several relatively large communities centred around the missions.

In 1980, a married Canadian missionary couple came to live among the Yeꞌkuana for a while, but they did not like their way of life, and there were disagreements between them and the Yeꞌkuana, and they left. After this, the Brazilian Yeꞌkuana decided that they did not want religion, but they did want a school, seeing the benefits that that infrastructure had provided indigenous communities in Venezuela. They got one, after negotiating with the leader of the Evangelical Mission of Amazônas. So began a process of becoming sedentary, wherein the Yeꞌkuana all moved closer together, and established semi-regular schedules (including that certain times of day for children were set aside for school). This establishment of solid permanent contact also led to more far-reaching mobilisation and contact with other indigenous communities and the state of Roraima. The Yeꞌkuana became known as skilled canoe makers and manioc scrapers, all while remaining fairly removed from the intense river traffic and influx of outsiders that had harmed many other indigenous communities.
