= Ninam language =

Yanomaman language spoken in Brazil and Venezuela

Ninam
- Yanam
- Native to: Brazil, Venezuela
- Native speakers: 470 in Brazil (2012); 560 in Venezuela (2010) (excluding Yaroamë)
- Language family: Yanomam: Ninam

Language codes
- ISO 639-3: shb
- Glottolog: nina1238
- ELP: Ninam
- Yanomaman languages location Yanomamö Ninam Yanomám Sanumá Ỹaroamë

Ninam, or Yanam, is a Yanomaman language spoken in Roraima, Brazil (800 speakers) and southern Venezuela near the Mucajai, upper Uraricaá, and Paragua rivers.

== Synonymy ==
Yanam is also known by the following names: Ninam, Yanam–Ninam, Xirianá, Shiriana Casapare, Kasrapai, Jawaperi, Crichana, Jawari, Shiriana, Eastern Yanomaman.

== Regional variation ==
Gordon (2009) reports 2 main varieties (Northern, Southern). Kaufman (1994) reports 3:

1. Yanam (a.k.a. Northern Yanam/Ninam (Xiliana, Shiriana, Uraricaa-Paragua))
2. Ninam (a.k.a. Southern Yanam/Ninam (Xilixana, Shirishana, Mukajai))
3. Jawarib

The name Jawari is shared with Ỹaroamë.

There are three dialects spoken in Roraima, Brazil according to Ferreira, et al. (2019):

- Northern (Xiriana): Ericó and Saúba
- Southern: Mucajaí
- Central: Uraricoera

The remaining speakers of Arutani and Sapé also speak Ninam (Shirián), since they now mostly live in Ninam villages.

=== Mason (1950) ===
Dialects listed by Mason (1950):

- Waharibo (Guaharibo)
  - Shirianá
    - Waicá (Guaica, Vaica)
- Carimé (Karimé)

== Phonology ==
=== Vowels ===
Yanam contrasts seven vowel qualities. Vowel length and nasalization are phonemic, and both features can occur simultaneously, for all vowels except /ɨ/.

Short vowels
	Front		Central		Back	
	oral	nasal	oral	nasal	oral	nasal
Close	i	ĩ	ɨ	ɨ̃	u	ũ
Mid	e	ẽ	ə	ə̃	o	õ
Open			a	ã		

Long vowels
	Front		Central		Back	
	oral	nasal	oral	nasal	oral	nasal
Close	iː	ĩː	ɨː		uː	ũː
Mid	eː	ẽː	əː	ə̃ː	oː	õː
Open			aː	ãː		

=== Consonants ===
		Bilabial	Alveolar	Palatal	Velar	Glottal
Nasal		m	n			
Plosive/ Affricate	tenuis	p	t	tʃ	k	
Plosive/ Affricate	aspirated		tʰ			
Fricative			s	ʃ		h
Liquid			ɾ	j		

== Bibliography ==
- Campbell, Lyle (1997). American Indian languages: The historical linguistics of Native America. New York: Oxford University Press. ISBN 0-19-509427-1.
- Kaufman, Terrence (1994). "The native languages of South America". In Mosley, C.; Asher, R. E. (eds.). Atlas of the world's languages. London: Routledge. pp. 46–76.
- Migliazza, Ernest; Grimes, Joseph E. (1961). "Shiriana Phonology". Anthropological Linguistics. 3 (6). ISSN 0003-5483.
- "SAPhon – South American Phonological Inventories". linguistics.berkeley.edu.
