= Continuum concept =

School of thought in parenting and human evolution, created by Jean Liedloff

The continuum concept is an idea, coined by Jean Liedloff in her 1975 book The Continuum Concept, that human beings have an innate set of expectations (which Liedloff calls the continuum) that our evolution as a species has designed us to meet in order to achieve optimal physical, mental, and emotional development and adaptability. According to Liedloff, in order to achieve this level of development, young humans (especially babies) require the kind of experience to which our species adapted during the long process of our evolution by natural selection.

== The continuum ==
For infants, the experiences include:

- Immediate placement, after birth, in their mothers' arms: Liedloff comments that the common hospital protocol of immediately separating a newborn from its mother may hormonally disrupt the mother, possibly explaining high rates of postpartum depression;
- Constant carrying or physical contact with other people (usually their mothers or fathers) in the several months after birth, as these adults go about their day-to-day business (during which the infants observe and thus learn, but also nurse, or sleep); this forms a strong basis of personal security for infants, according to Liedloff, from which they will begin developing a healthy drive for independent exploration by eventually starting to naturally creep, and then crawl, usually at six to eight months; She calls this the "In-Arms" phase.
- Sleeping in the parents' bed (called co-sleeping), in constant physical contact, until leaving of their own volition (often about two years);
- Breastfeeding "on cue"—involving infants' bodily signals being immediately answered by their mothers' nursing them;
- Caregivers' immediate response to the infants' urgent body signals (flaring temper, crying, sniffling, etc.), without judgment, displeasure, or invalidation of the children's needs, but also not showing any undue concern or focusing on or overindulging the children;
- Sensing (and fulfilling) elders' expectations that the infants are innately social and cooperative and have strong self-preservation instincts, and that they are welcome and worthy (yet without making them the constant center of attention)

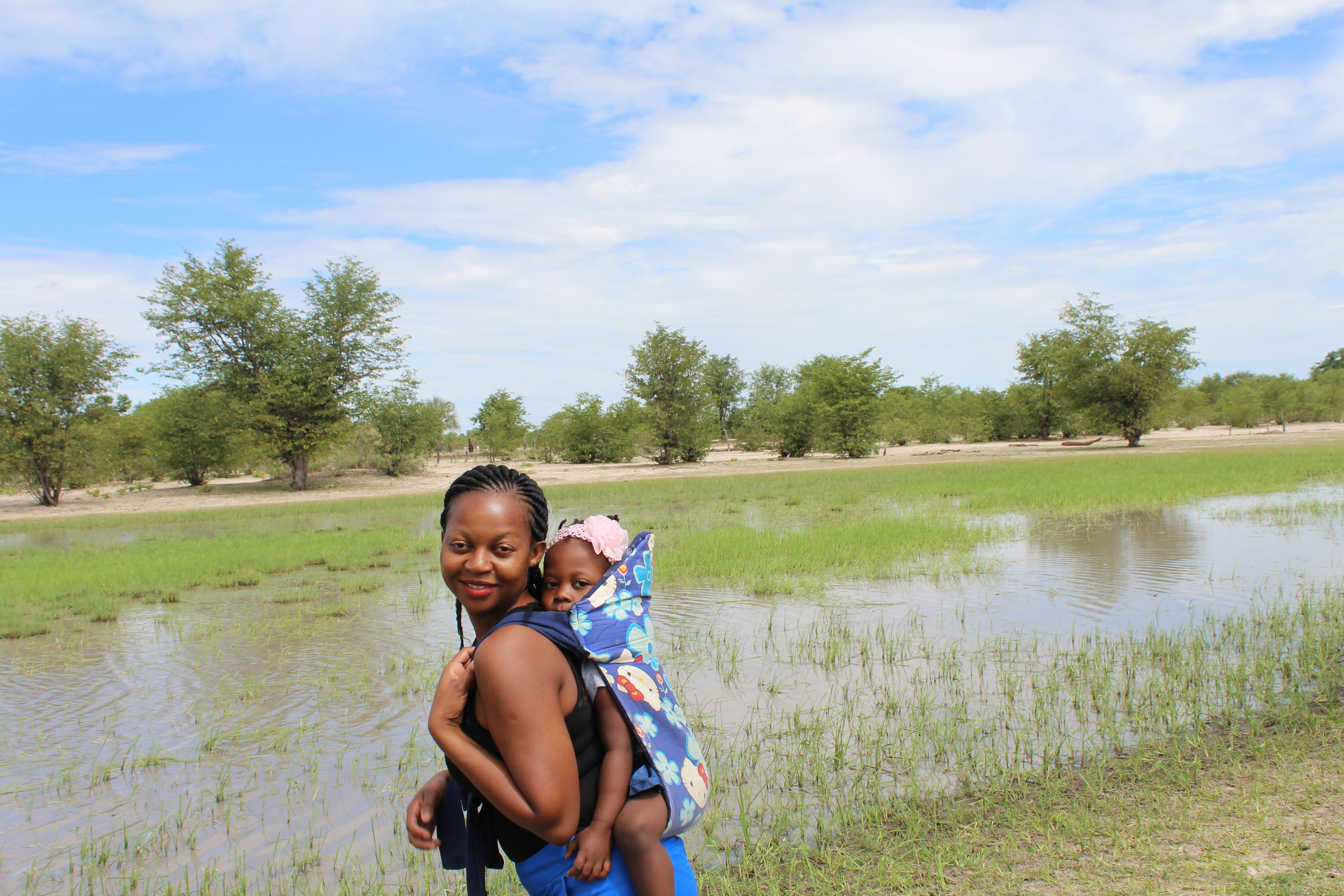
Namibian woman with her baby on her back

== Compensatory responses ==
Liedloff suggests that when certain evolutionary expectations are not met as infants and toddlers, compensation for these needs will be sought, by alternate means, throughout life, resulting in many forms of mental and social disorders. She also argues that these expectations are largely distorted, neglected, and/or not properly met in civilized cultures which have removed themselves from the natural evolutionary process, resulting in the aforementioned abnormal psychological and social conditions. Liedloff's recommendations fit in more generally with evolutionary psychology, attachment theory, and the philosophy known as the Paleolithic lifestyle: optimizing well-being by living more like our hunter-gatherer ancestors, who Liedloff refers to as "evolved" humans, since their lifeways developed through natural selection by living in the wild.

== Documentary ==
The continuum concept featured on television in the UK in the 2007 Channel 4 series Bringing Up Baby. It was featured as one of three influential parenting "methods" of the 20th century which a number of new parents tested out.

== See also ==
- Ye'kuana people
