= Yeꞌkuana language =

Indigenous language in South America

Yeꞌkuana
- Maquiritari, Dekwana
- Yeꞌkuana
- Pronunciation: [jeʔkwana]
- Native to: Venezuela
- Ethnicity: Yeꞌkuana
- Native speakers: (6,000 cited 2000 – 2001 census)
- Language family: Cariban: Guianan Carib; Yeꞌkuana
- Dialects: Wayumara

Language codes
- ISO 639-3: mch
- Glottolog: maqu1238
- ELP: Yekuana

- Yecuana is classified as Vulnerable by the UNESCO Atlas of the World's Languages in Danger

Yeꞌkuana (Yeꞌkuana: [jeʔkwana]), also known as Maquiritari, Dekwana, Yeꞌkwana, Yeꞌcuana, Yekuana, Cunuana, Kunuhana, Deꞌcuana, Deꞌkwana Carib, Pawana, Maquiritai, Maquiritare, Maiongong, or Soto, is the Cariban language of the Yeꞌkuana people of Venezuela and Brazil. It is spoken by approximately 5,900 people (c. 2001) around the border of northwestern Brazilian state of Roraima and Venezuela – the majority (about 5,500) in Venezuela. At the time of the 2001 Venezuelan census, there were at 6,523 Yeꞌkuana living in Venezuela. Given the unequal distribution of the Yeꞌkuana across two South American countries, Ethnologue lists two different vitality ratings for Yeꞌkuana: in Venezuela it is listed as Vigorous (6a), while in Brazil it is classified Moribund (8a) on the Graded Intergenerational Disruption Scale (GIDS).

== Classification ==
The Yeꞌkuana language is situated typologically in the Cariban family, which is subdivided into seven subfamilies and one uncategorised language. Yeꞌkuana is a member of the Guianan Carib subfamily, along with ten other languages. The Guianan languages are located, for the most part, around the Guiana Shield. Yeꞌkuana and Wayumara form a smaller category within the Guianan subfamily, the Maquiritari-Wayumara subfamily.

== Documentation ==
The first documentations of Yeꞌkuana in the nineteenth century consist of several wordlists by Schomburgk, followed by several comparative and ethnographic works. The early twentieth century saw more wordlists, moving away from works more generally about the Cariban languages to more specifically focusing on Yeꞌkuana. Escoriaza (1959 and 1960) provided a grammatical sketch. The 1960s and 70s mostly saw work on the ethnography of the Yeꞌkuana, including their mythology, political structure, and village formation. Schuster 1976 published a wordlist within his ethnography, but otherwise there was not much linguistic study in that time period. Heinen (1983–1984) published a grammar sketch couched in his mostly ethnographic study; Guss (1986) includes some texts in the language in his publication on oral tradition; and Hall (1988) published two volumes on morphosyntax and discourse analysis. Later, Hall (1991) looked at transitivity in verbs, amid many more ethnographic studies, and Chavier (1999) studied some further aspects of the morphology. A dictionary was published on CD-ROM, and most recently, Natália Cáceres’ MA thesis is a brief overview of the sociolinguistic profile of the Yeꞌkuana, while her doctoral dissertation presents a more complete descriptive grammar. Coutinho (2013) has also explored the number system of Yeꞌkuana, from a typological perspective.

== Phonology ==
Consonants, adapted from Cáceres (2011)
| | Bilabial | Alveolar | Post- alveolar | Palatal | Velar | Glottal |
|---|---|---|---|---|---|---|
| Nasal | m ⟨m⟩ | n ⟨n⟩ | | ɲ ⟨ñ/nh⟩ | | |
| Plosive | | t ⟨t⟩ | | tʃ ⟨ch⟩ | k ⟨k⟩ | ʔ ⟨'⟩ |
| Fricative | | s ⟨s⟩ | ʃ ⟨s, sh⟩ | ç ⟨j/jh⟩ | | h ⟨j⟩ |
| Rhotic | | | ɾ̠ ⟨d⟩ | | | |
| Glide | w ⟨w⟩ | | | j ⟨y⟩ | | |

Vowels, adapted from Cáceres (2011)
| | Front | Central | Back |
|---|---|---|---|
| Close | i iː ⟨i, ii⟩ | ɨ ɨː ⟨ö, öö/ü, üü⟩ | u uː ⟨u, uu⟩ |
| Mid | e eː ⟨e, ee⟩ | ə əː ⟨ö, öö/ä, ää⟩ | o oː ⟨o, oo⟩ |
| Open | | a aː ⟨a, aa⟩ | |

At the beginning of a word, and after a glottal stop, /ɾ̠/ becomes [d], /j/ is in free variation with [ɟ], and /h/ becomes [hʷ] ~ [ɸ]; this last change also happens following /o/, /u/, or /w/.

All consonants except the glottal stop /ʔ/ can be found geminated; it is unclear what phonetic environments allow gemination, and similarly unclear whether a distinction exists between geminated consonants and sequences of glottal stop plus consonant. The phoneme /k/ is commonly labialized to [kʷ] when geminated or preceded by /ʔ/, /o/, /u/, or /w/, and occasionally also after /n/ [ŋ].

The glottal stop /ʔ/ is always treated as part of the syllable coda for the purposes of assigning stress (see below) and can also be realized as laryngealization (creaky voice) on the preceding vowel.

Nasals become [ŋ] before /k/, /w/, and /ʔ/, [ɲ] after /i/ and /j/, and [m] before /h/; in this last case the /h/ also assimilates to become an unvoiced [m̥]. Any nasal can cause nasalization of a preceding short vowel.

Most consonants palatalize in various ways after /i/ and /j/: /t/ and /k/ become [tʃ], /s/ becomes [ʃ], /h/ becomes [ç], nasals become [ɲ], /w/ and /ɾ̠/ ordinarily become [j], and /ɾ̠/ becomes [tʃ] in certain special cases (at the right border of a word, or sometimes as part of the possessive suffix -dü).

Syllables have a (C)V(ː/C) structure. Long vowels cannot occur in closed syllables. Syllables codas can only be /w/, /j/, /ʔ/, or a nasal, and the final syllable of a word can only have coda /w/ or /j/ (or no coda at all).

There are two separate accentual systems operating simultaneously. One deals with vowel length and is iambic in nature: it causes the vowel in every short-vowelled open syllable preceded by a short-vowelled open syllable to lengthen, applied recursively from the start of the word. Thus, some long vowels are unpredictable and phonemic, while others can be fully predicted by the vowel lengthening rule; writing systems differ in choosing to represent either only the first type or both types as long. This rule does not apply to bisyllabic words, whose vowel lengths seem irregular, and it also does not affect the final syllables of longer words, which show no length distinction. The second accentual system deals with pitch and is simpler: in words without attached clitics, a high pitch tends to fall on the penultimate syllable.

Some dialectal variation is found. In some areas speakers (particularly younger city-dwellers) merge /ʃ/ into /s/. A Yeꞌkwana and De'kwana dialect are sometimes differentiated, where some words that have /j/ in Yeꞌkwana have /ɾ̠/ instead in De'kwana. Sequences of /wɾ̠/ [wɾ̠] ~ [wɾ̠ʷ] ~ [ɾ̠ʷ] in De'kwana also correspond to /ɾ̠ɾ̠/ [dd] in Yeꞌkwana, and some vowels differ.

== Orthography ==
Several different orthographies are in use. In Venezuela, the one in widest official use was devised in the 1970s according to the conventions of the Venezuelan Indigenous Languages Alphabet (ALIV) (with some later modifications). It has been widely adopted by speakers in the state of Bolívar. Earlier orthographies designed by missionaries still see some usage, however, and speakers in Brazil and in the Venezuelan state of Amazonas in particular often use a somewhat different system.

=== Vowels ===
In the standard orthography used in Venezuela, /ɨ/ is written ⟨ü⟩, and /ə/ is written ⟨ö⟩. Some writing systems, such as the one in use in Brazil and Amazonas, instead write ⟨ö⟩ for /ɨ/, and ⟨ä⟩ for /ə/. Long vowels are indicated by doubling the letter. As discussed under Phonology above, orthographies all represent phonemic long vowels as long, but differ on whether to represent non-phonemic long vowels as long or short.

- [a] - a
- [ə] - ö (Venezuelan standard), ä (Brazil and Amazonas)
- [e] - e
- [i] - i
- [o] - o
- [ɨ] - ü (Venezuelan standard), ö (Brazil and Amazonas)
- [u] - u
- [aː] - aa
- [əː] - öö (Venezuelan standard), ää (Brazil and Amazonas)
- [eː] - ee
- [iː] - ii
- [oː] - oo
- [ɨː] - üü (Venezuelan standard), öö (Brazil and Amazonas)
- [uː] - uu

=== Consonants ===
- [t͡ʃ] - ch
- [ɾ̠]~[d] - d
- [ð]~[d] (only found in De'kwana dialect) - d (Venezuelan standard), dh (Brazil and Amazonas)
- [hʷ]~[ɸ] - j (Venezuelan standard), f (Brazil and Amazonas)
- [h] - j
- [ç] - j (Venezuelan standard), jh (Brazil and Amazonas)
- [k] - k
- [kʷ] - kw
- [m] - m
- [n] - n
- [ɲ] - ñ (Venezuela), nh (Brazil)
- [ŋ] - n before k, w, or '; elsewhere, n' (Venezuelan standard) or ng (Brazil and Amazonas)
- [s] - s
- [ʃ] - sh, s
- [t] - t
- [ʔ] - '
- [w] - w at the start of a syllable, u at the end
- [j]~[ɟ] - y at the start of a syllable, i at the end

== Morphology ==
Yeꞌkuana's morphology is comparable to that of other Cariban languages. Yeꞌkuana makes use of the following major grammatical aspects: past and non-past. The 'past' aspect is subdivided into recent and distant (the much more used of the two) as well as perfective and imperfective. The 'non-past' is used for present, near future, and general truths. As well, probable and definite future aspects are morphologically distinct, there is a distinct imperfective suffix, and the iterative, durative (past), inchoative, terminative aspects are all marked, the latter three being marked periphrastically, rather than with a suffix like the others.

=== Pronouns ===
| Person | Singular | Plural |
|---|---|---|
| First person | ewü | |
| Second person | amödö | önwanno |
| Third person | tüwü | tünwanno |
| First + Second person | küwü | künwanno |
| First + Third person | nña | |

The first person plural is represented by three forms in Yeꞌkuana: a dual inclusive form küwü, a dual exclusive form nña, and a plural inclusive form künwanno. There is no plural exclusive form.

Ewü wüta sü'na jadö'danñe
ewü w-ütö(mö)-a sü'na jadö-'da-nñe
1SG 1.S-go-NPST dog with-NEG-PL
I'm going there without the dogs.

Aaa, amödö ajadööne küna'ja'to
aaa amödö a-jadö-:ne kün-a'ja-akö=to
ah 2SG 2-with-INTENS 3.S.REM-COP-REM=COL
Ah, you were with them (lit. They were with you).

Emajainñe tüwü
Ø-ema-jai-:ne tüwü
3.O-throw-ABIL-INTENS 3SG
He is able to kill/throw (during a fight).

Amödö owoijie mödöje nña yaawö
amödö o-woije mödöje nña yaawö
2SG 2-willingness thus 1+3 therefore
Because of you we are like this (= we have adopted your customs).

Ñennöjaimmaja önwanno yawö
i-mennö-jai=mmaja önwanno yaawö
3.O-write-ABIL=also 2PL therefore
You can also write [because you have gone to school].

Juwaije tünwanno
juwai=je tünwanno
shaman=ATRB 3PL
They were shamans.

Ööjimmö künwanno
öö-jimmö-Ø künwanno
RECP-family-POS 1PL
We are from the same family (lit. we are family of one another).

=== Derivational morphology ===
There is an extensive and productive derivation system, including nominalising, verbalising, and adverbialising suffixes. The system of nominalisation allows for adverbs to be converted, for instance judume ‘black’ becomes judum-ato ‘that which is black’, eetö ‘here’ becomes eeto-no ‘that which is here’, etc.; it also has many varieties of verbal nominalisation: intransitivisation, participlisation, agentivisation (önöö ‘eat (meat)’ becomes t-önöö-nei ‘eater of meat’), deverbal nominalisation of action, instrumental (a’deuwü ‘talk’ gives w-a’deuwü-tojo ‘telephone’), and nominalisation of a participle. In terms of verbalisation, there is the benefactive ‘give N to someone, bring N to something’, such as a’deu ‘language, word’ becoming a’deu-tö ‘read, repeat’; its reverse, the privative (womü ‘clothes’ -> i-womü-ka ‘undress someone); a general verbalisation suffix -ma; -nö which can be used to make transitive verbs; -ta which can be used to make intransitive verbs such as vomit and speak; and the occasional suffixes -dö, -wü, and -’ñö. Finally, the adverbialising suffixes include: nominal possessive, participial, abilitive, a form that indicates the destination of a movement, one indicating aptitude, indicating newness of action, potential, and deverbal negative.

=== Aspects ===
==== Future ====
The probable future aspect is indicated with the suffix -tai, composed of the future marker -ta and the irrealis marker -i. It does not occur frequently in the elicited data in Cáceres (2011), and it indicates an event for which a probability of its taking place exists, without certainty. The certain future is likewise rarely marked in spontaneous speech. Examples of the probable future given in the grammar include phrases that translate to “you will learn the Yeꞌkuana language” and “tomorrow it will become red”, contrasted with the certain future examples: “another day I will come and I will see you” (where the second verb is the one marked).

=== Valency marking ===
The language presents several strategies for changing the valency of a verb, primarily a detransitiviser prefix and several causativiser suffixes.

==== Detransitive ====
The base form detransitiviser is postulated to have the form öt-, and has eight allomorphs: öt-, ö-, ö’-, ot-, o’-, o-, at-, and a-.

Transitive verb roots beginning (at the surface level) with e take the detransitive prefix öt-:

eeka öt-ööka
{'to bite'} {'to bite oneself'}

eicha öt-öicha
{'to paint'} {'to paint oneself'}

Transitive roots beginning with o, or with e where the second vowel is [+round] take ot-:

ooneja ot-ooneja
{'to measure'} {'to fight'}

enku'to ot-onku'to
{'to lie'} {'to be mistaken'}

Transitive roots beginning with a take at-:

a'dojo at-a'dojo
{'to drop'} {'to fall'}

aiyo at-aiyo
{'to break'} {'to break oneself (fracture)'}

For the most part, the patterning of the allomorphs is phonologically based, however, some roots have slight differences in meaning depending on the allomorph they receive:

adö a-adö at-adö
{'to carry'} {'to be carried'} {'to follow'}

ajöi a-ajöi at-ajöi
{'to take'} {'to attach oneself'} ???

ene ö-öne öt-öne
{'to see'} {'to be seen, look like'} {'to see oneself'}

==== Causative ====
All classes of verb in Yeꞌkuana can receive a causative suffix, but each of the two types of intransitive verbs (termed U_{P} and U_{A}) has their own suffix that they take. Intransitive verbs of type U_{P} can take the suffixes -nüjü (with allomorphs -mjü and -nü’) and -nöjü (with allomorphs -mjü and -nö’), and the result is a transitive verb:

| Intransitive | English | Transitive | English |
|---|---|---|---|
| ünükü | 'sleep' | nün-nöjü | 'make sleep' |
| seedeta | 'dry' | sedena-mjü | 'make dry' |
| edenna | 'stop' | edenna-mjü | 'finalise something' |

Transitive verbs and intransitive verbs of type U_{A} can take the causative suffix -jo. In the case of transitive verbs, another argument is added to the valency of the verb, while intransitives maintain their initial valency. This suffix is used relatively rarely with intransitive verbs, and of all the examples given below begin with /e/, so it is theorised that these verbs take this suffix because they are derived from transitives; however, this theory has not been proven.

| Base form | English | Causative | English |
|---|---|---|---|
| e'wa'tö | 'to help oneself' | e'wa'to-jo | 'to be helped' |
| eja'ka | 'to leave' | ja'ka-jo | 'to be expelled' |
| eta'jü | 'to calm down' | eta'jü-jo | 'to calm oneself down' |
| e'ji | 'to wash oneself' | e'ji-jo | 'to be washed' |

=== Plurality ===
All unmarked nouns in Yeꞌkuana can be understood semantically as singular or "general" in number, while some nouns can receive explicit plural marking that distinguishes them from the singular/general-numbered nouns. Yeꞌkuana generally uses the suffix =komo to mark the nominal plural. Cáceres (2011) treats this suffix as a generic plural, while other authors such as Coutinho (2013) subscribe to the analysis given to other Cariban languages that they distinguish in number between the ‘all’ (i.e. collective) and ‘less-than-the-total’ (i.e. non-collective), and therefore treats this morpheme as a collective morpheme. After high-front vowel [i] and approximant [j], the palatalised variant =chomo is also seen. This suffix is used likewise for animate nouns and inanimate nouns:

ye'kwana ye'kwana=komo
{'ye'kuana'} {'several ye'kuanas'}

yanwaa yanwaa=komo
{'man'} {'several men'}

öji öji=chomo
{'medicine'} {'several medicines'}

nma nma=komo
{'house'} {'several houses'}

However, there are some restrictions on the distribution of this morpheme, for instance that names of animals cannot take it:

süna *süna=komo
'dog' {}

mado *mado=komo
'tiger' {}

kaduwai *kaduwai=chomo
'macaw' {}

In the Caura dialect studied by Cáceres (2011), a few other nouns exist that some speakers consider ungrammatical with the plural suffix, but others do not:

uu (*)uu=komo
'manioc' {}

kankudu (*)kankudu=komo
'calabash' {}

However, in the Auaris dialect, as examined by Coutinho (2013), the plural forms of these nouns and others were all accepted:

uu uu=komo
'manioc' {'several maniocs'}

kankudu kankudu=komo
'calabash' {'several calabashes'}

natö natö=komo
'yam' {'several yams'}

tukuudi tukuudi=chomo
'jug' {'several jugs'}

Even in the Auaris dialect, certain nouns denoting fruit do not accept the plural marker:

| *faduudu=komo | 'several bananas' |
| *sokwa=komo | 'several sokwas' |
| *ashiichadu | 'several canes' |
