= Yanomaman languages =

Indigenous language spoken in parts of South America

Yanomaman
- Geographic distribution: Amazon
- Ethnicity: Yąnomamö
- Linguistic classification: One of the world's primary language families
- Subdivisions: Ninam–Yanomam–Yaroamë; Sanöma; Yãnoma (unclassified)

Language codes
- Glottolog: yano1268
- Yanomaman languages location Yanomamö Ninam Yanomám Sanumá Ỹaroamë

Yanomaman, also as Yanomam, Yanomáman, Yamomámi, and Yanomamana (also Shamatari, Shirianan), is a family of languages spoken by about 20,000 Yanomami people in southern Venezuela and northwestern Brazil (Roraima, Amazonas).

== Subdivision ==
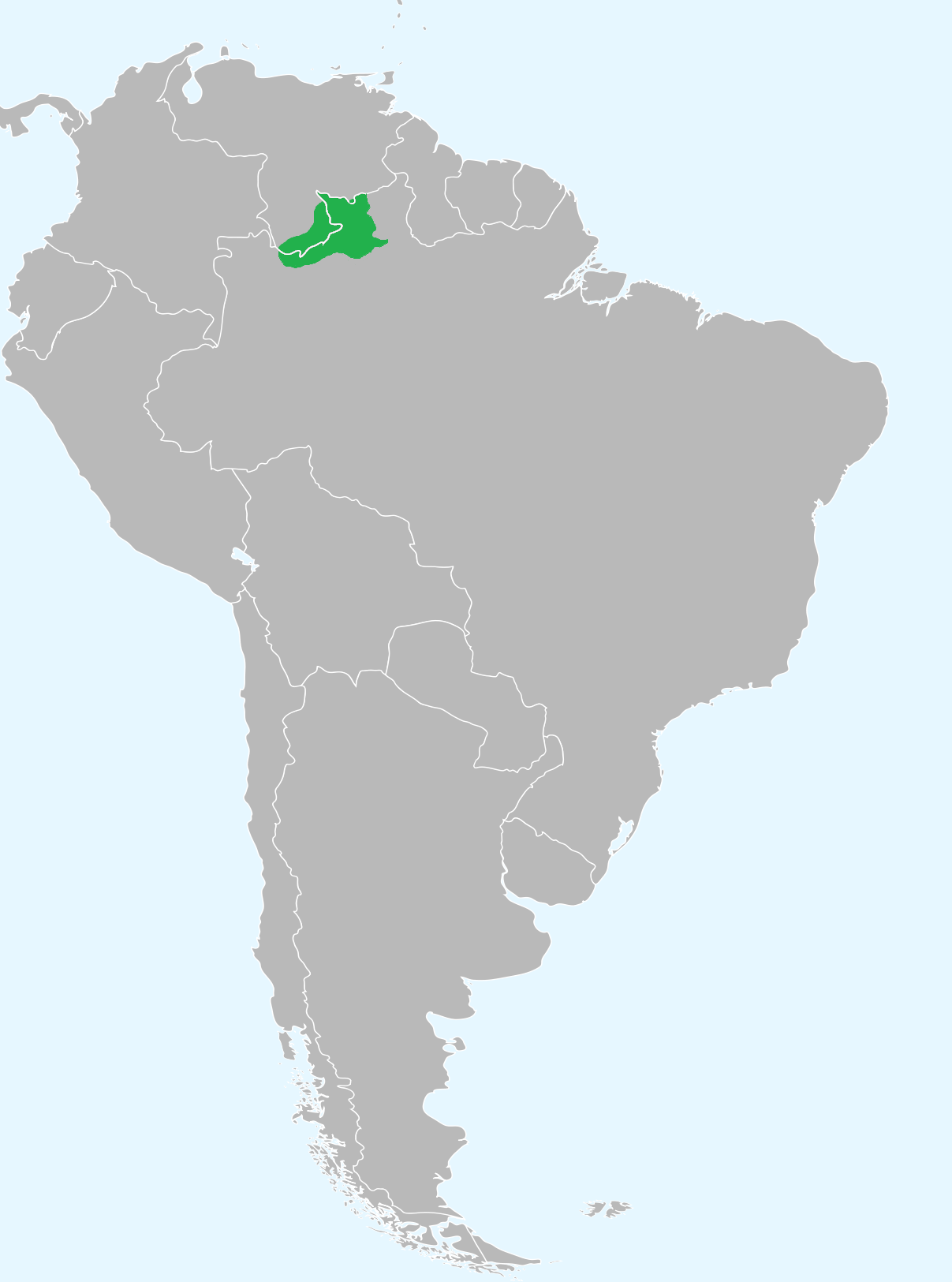
Distribution of the Yanomaman languages in South America

=== Ferreira et al. (2019) ===
Ferreira, Machado & Senra (2019) divide the Yanomaman family into two branches, with six languages in total.

- Yanomaman
  - Ninam-Yanomam-Yaroamë
    - Nimam
      - Ninam (also known as Yanami, Yanami-Ninami) - 900 speakers in Venezuela and Brazil
    - Yanomam-Yaroamë
      - Yanomám (also known as Waiká) - 6,000 speakers mainly in Brazil
      - Yanomamö (also known as Yanomame, Yanomami) - 20,000 speakers mainly in Venezuela
      - Yaroamë (also known as Jawari) - 400 speakers in Brazil
      - Yãnoma - 178 speakers in Brazil
  - Sanumá
    - Sanumá (also known as Tsanuma, Sanima) - 5,100 speakers mainly in Venezuela

Sanumá is the most lexically distinct. Yanomamö has the most speakers (20,000), while Yãnoma has the fewest (178).

=== Jolkesky (2016) ===
Internal classification by Jolkesky (2016):

(† = extinct)

- Yanomami
  - Sanuma
  - Yanam
  - Yanomami, Central
    - Yaroame
    - Yanomam, Yanomamï

== Genetic relations ==
Yanomaman is usually not connected with any other language family. Joseph Greenberg has suggested a relationship between Yanomaman and Macro-Chibchan. Migliazza (1985) has suggested a connection with Panoan and Chibchan. Neither proposal is widely accepted.

== Language contact ==
Jolkesky (2016) notes that there are lexical similarities with the Irantxe, Taruma, Katukina-Katawixi, Puinave-Kak, Tupi, Arawa, Guahibo, and Jivaro language families due to contact.

== Name ==
Yanomami is not what the Yanomami call themselves and is instead a word in their language meaning "man" or "human being". The American anthropologist Napoleon Chagnon adopted this term with the transcription Ya̧nomamö to use as an exonym to refer to the culture and, by extension, the people. The word is pronounced with nasalisation of all the vowels. As the phoneme indicated by the spelling 'ö' does not occur in English, variations in spelling and pronunciation of the name have developed, with Yanomami, Yanomamö, Ya̧nomamö or Ya̦nomamö, and Yanomama all being used. Some anthropologists have used the spelling Yanomamɨ to indicate the vowel [ɨ], but because many presses and typesetters eliminate the diacritical marks, the pronunciation /i/ and spelling of the name with ⟨i⟩ has emerged.

== Characteristics ==
=== Phonology ===
All Yanomaman languages have a phonemic contrast between oral and nasal vowels.

	Front		Central		Back	
	oral	nasal	oral	nasal	oral	nasal
Close	i	ĩ	ɨ	ɨ̃	u	ũ
Mid	e	ẽ	ə	ə̃	o	õ
Open			a	ã		

- /ɨ ə/ are written ⟨y/ö ë/ä⟩.
- Not all of them contrast /ɨ ə/ or /ə ə̃/.

Extensive nasal harmony can be observed: when a vowel is nasalized, all vowels that follow within the same word are also nasalized.

Members of this family generally have relatively small consonant inventories, as in e.g. Yanomám:

		Labial	Alveolar	Palatal	Velar	Glottal
Nasal		m	n			
Plosive	tenuis	p	t		k	
Plosive	aspirated		tʰ			
Fricative			s	ʃ		h
Liquid		w	ɾ ~ l	j		

Notably, only the alveolar plosive has an aspiration contrast; this is unusual cross-linguistically, as consonant inventories tend to be more symmetrical. Not all Yanomaman languages have an aspiration contrast, but in the ones that do only /tʰ/ is present.

=== Syntax ===
Yanomaman languages are SOV, suffixing, predominantly head-marking with elements of dependent-marking. Its typology is highly polysynthetic. Adjectival concepts are expressed using stative verbs, there are no true adjectives. Adjectival stative verbs follow their noun.

There are five demonstratives which have to be chosen according to distance from speaker and hearer and also according to visibility, a feature shared by many native Brazilian languages such as Tupian ones including Old Tupi. Demonstratives, numerals, classifiers and quantifiers precede the head noun.

There is a distinction between alienable and inalienable possession, again a common areal feature, and a rich system of verbal classifiers, almost a hundred, they are obligatory and appear just before the verb root. The distinction between inclusive and exclusive 1st person plural, a feature shared by most Native American languages, has been lost in Yanam and Yanomam dialects, but retained in the others.

Yanomami morphosyntactic alignment is ergative–absolutive, which means that the subject of an intransitive verb is marked the same way as the object of a transitive verb, while the subject of a transitive verb is marked differently. The ergative case marker is -ny. The verb agrees with both the subject and object.

Evidentiality in the Yanomami dialect is marked on the verb and has four levels: eyewitness, deduced, reported, and assumed. Other dialects have fewer levels.

The object of the verb can be incorporated into it, especially if it is not in focus:

Non-incorporated:

kamijə-ny sipara ja-puhi-i
1sg-ERG axe 1sg-want-DYN
'I want an/the axe'

Incorporated:

kamijə-ny ja-sipara-puhi-i
1sg-ERG 1sg-axe-want-DYN
'I want [it], the axe'

Relative clauses are formed by adding a relativizing ('REL' below) suffix to the verb:

wãro-n shama shyra-wei ware-ma
man-ERG tapir kill-REL eat-COMPL
'the man who killed the tapir ate it'

Sanuma dialect also has a relative pronoun ĩ.

== Bibliography ==
- Aikhenvald, Alexandra Y.; Dixon, R.M.W. (1999). The Amazonian Languages. Cambridge: Cambridge University Press. ISBN 9780521570213.
- Campbell, Lyle (1997). American Indian languages: The historical linguistics of Native America. New York: Oxford University Press. ISBN 0-19-509427-1.
- Ferreira, Helder Perri (2017). Yanomama Clause Structure (PDF). Utrecht: LOT. ISBN 978-94-6093-258-8. Archived (PDF) from the original on 18 April 2021.
- Greenberg, Joseph H. (1960). "General classification of Central and South American languages". In Wallace, A. (ed.). Men and cultures: Fifth international congress of anthropological and ethnological sciences (1956). Philadelphia: University of Pennsylvania Press. pp. 791–794.
- Greenberg, Joseph H. (1987). Language in the Americas. Stanford: Stanford University Press.
- Kaufman, Terrence (1990). "Language history in South America: What we know and how to know more". In Payne, D. L. (ed.). Amazonian linguistics: Studies in lowland South American languages. Austin: University of Texas Press. pp. 13–67. ISBN 0-292-70414-3..
- Kaufman, Terrence (1994). "The native languages of South America". In Mosley, C.; Asher, R. E. (eds.). Atlas of the world's languages. London: Routledge. pp. 46–76.
- Mattei-Müller, M (2007). Lengua y cultura yanomami: diccionario ilustrado yanomami-español, español-yanomami. Caracas: CONAC.
- Migliazza, E. C. (1972). Yanomama grammar and intelligibility (PhD thesis). Indiana University.
- Migliazza, Ernest C. (1985). "Languages of the Orinoco-Amazon region: Current status". In Manelis Klein, H. E.; Stark, L. R. (eds.). South American Indian languages: Retrospect and prospect. Austin: University of Texas Press. pp. 17–139.
- Migliazza, Ernest C.; Campbell, Lyle (1988). Panorama general de las lenguas indígenas en América. Historia general de América. Vol. 10. Caracas: Instituto Panamericano de Geografía e Historia.

=== Dictionaries ===
- Müller, Marie-Claude Mattei. (2007) Diccionario ilustrado yanomami-español / español-yanomami. Caracas: Epsilon Libros. 782pp.
